= On the Run (Paul McCartney) =

2011–12 concert tour by Paul McCartney

- Transcontinental tour by Paul McCartney
- Location: Asia • Europe • North America • South America
- Associated album: Band on the Run (reissue)
- Start date: 15 July 2011
- End date: 29 November 2012
- Legs: 6
- No. of shows: 37

Paul McCartney concert chronology
- Up and Coming Tour (2010–11); On the Run (2011–12); Out There (2013–15)

On the Run was a concert tour by English singer-songwriter Paul McCartney. The tour began on 15 July 2011, with McCartney's first two concerts at Yankee Stadium in New York City. McCartney's appearances at Yankee Stadium occurred nearly two years to the day after his 17, 18, and 21 July 2009 concerts at Citi Field, documented on the Good Evening New York City CD/DVD.

== Background ==
The tour was promoted by AEG Live, and six of the eight shows in the first leg (with the exception of the Yankee Stadium shows) were presented by HP. The Mexican concerts were promoted by Nextel. In an interview with Billboard in February 2012, McCartney said of his tour band: "Aren't they cool? We're having a really great time, and last year we played quite a few dates. They're such a pleasure to play with. We all enjoy each other's company and the musicianship, and next month we will have been playing together 10 years. That's long enough to make us a proper band."

=== In North America ===
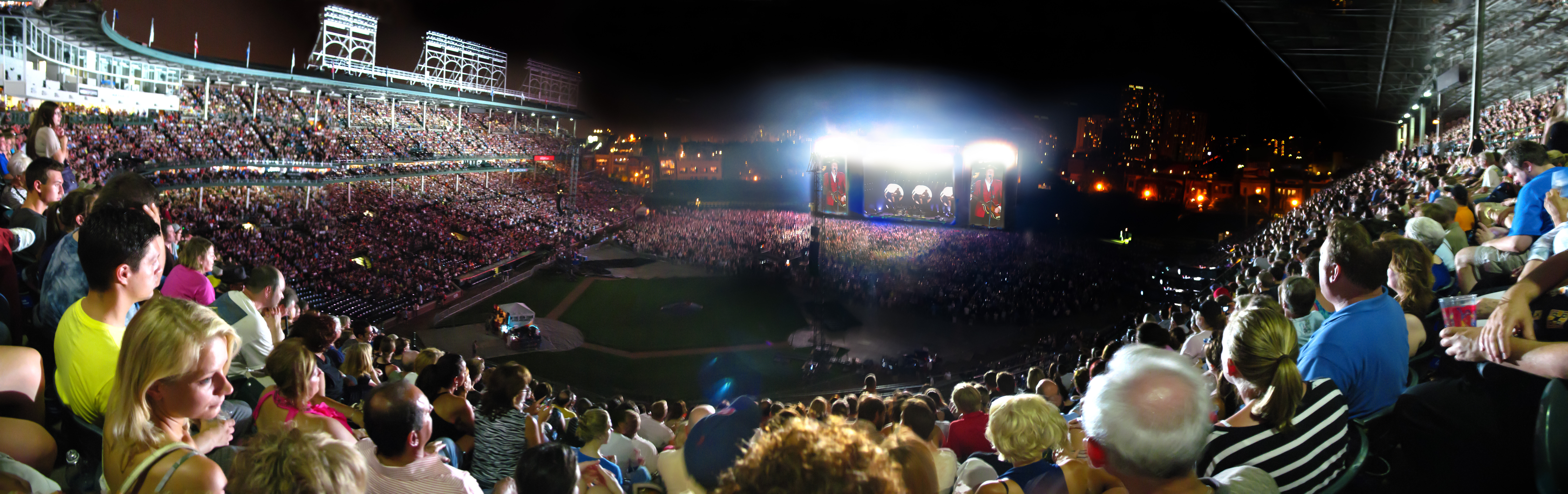
Paul McCartney at Wrigley Field, 1 August 2011

In response to overwhelming popular demand for tickets to McCartney's 15 July Yankee Stadium debut, a second date was added for Saturday, 16 July. McCartney also performed on three more dates on the tour: 24 July at Comerica Park in Detroit, Michigan, 31 July at Wrigley Field in Chicago, Illinois, and 4 August at The Great American Ball Park in Cincinnati, Ohio. McCartney's Detroit, Chicago and Cincinnati stadium gigs were hugely anticipated returns to cities with that have hosted historical performances in the past: The 24 July Comerica Park and 31 July Wrigley Field shows were his first visits to the Detroit area and Chicago since 2005 (McCartney has not performed within Detroit City limits since 1976 during the Wings Over America Tour), while the 4 August Great American Ball Park was his first Cincinnati appearance in 18 years, his last show in the city being on The New World Tour in 1993.

=== In Latin America ===
In Montevideo, Uruguay all tickets were sold-out in about 40 minutes. On 15 April, McCartney performed for over a 54,000 sold-out crowd in the Estadio Centenario for the first time in Uruguay. The artist also visited Asunción, Paraguay for the first time in his career. In the Defensores del Chaco stadium he gave a show for more than 30,000 fans (29,000 sold tickets). He claimed after the show in his website that "he will never forget the lively Paraguayan crowd". On 27 March, 29,000 tickets for McCartney's 19 April first ever show in Colombia became available; 24 hours later 90% of the tickets were already sold. Days before the concert 2,000 extra tickets became available and sold-out in a couple of days. Hours before McCartney performed for the very first time in Colombia, less than 900 tickets had not been sold, which made the concert a sold-out show. Paul performed for a 32,000 crowd at the Stadium El Campin for more than two hours and a half and declared that the audience in the show where possibly the best one he have had during all his career. For the first time in 19 years, McCartney performed the song "Hope of Deliverance" in Bogotá, Colombia, on 19 April, being it the very first time that he performed a song from Off the Ground album with his current line-up.

Paul McCartney performed on 5 May 2012 at Omnilife Stadium at Guadalajara, Jalisco, Mexico, his first concert in that city. For the first time, on 8 May 2012, he performed at Estadio Azteca, stating he was in front of "the loudest crowd ever", and he finished his tour in Mexico with a free show at Zócalo; for this last one, attendance was estimated to be around 250,000 people, making it the biggest audience since the Kiev (350,000) and Quebec (250,000) shows.

== Personnel ==
Rusty Anderson (Backing vocals, Electric Guitar, Acoustic Guitar)	Paul McCartney (Lead vocals, Bass, Piano, Acoustic Guitar, Electric Guitar, Ukulele, Mandolin)	Brian Ray (Backing vocals, Bass, Electric Guitar, Acoustic Guitar)
Paul Wickens (Backing vocals, Keyboards, Percussion, Electric Guitar, Acoustic Guitar, Accordion)	Paul McCartney (Lead vocals, Bass, Piano, Acoustic Guitar, Electric Guitar, Ukulele, Mandolin)	Abe Laboriel, Jr. (Backing vocals, Drums, Percussion, Bass)

== Tour dates ==
List of concerts, showing date, city, country, venue, opening act, tickets sold, number of available tickets and amount of gross revenue
Date	City	Country	Venue	Opening act	Attendance	Revenue
North America
15 July 2011	New York City	United States	Yankee Stadium	—N/a	—N/a	—N/a
16 July 2011	New York City	United States	Yankee Stadium	—N/a	—N/a	—N/a
24 July 2011	Detroit	United States	Comerica Park	DJ Chris Holmes	37,854 / 37,854	$3,470,134
26 July 2011	Montreal	Canada	Bell Centre	DJ Chris Holmes	33,733 / 33,733	$5,448,713
27 July 2011	Montreal	Canada	Bell Centre	DJ Chris Holmes	33,733 / 33,733	$5,448,713
31 July 2011	Chicago	United States	Wrigley Field	DJ Chris Holmes	83,988 / 83,988	$10,929,728
1 August 2011	Chicago	United States	Wrigley Field	DJ Chris Holmes	83,988 / 83,988	$10,929,728
4 August 2011	Cincinnati	United States	Great American Ball Park	DJ Chris Holmes	41,256 / 41,256	$4,158,146
Asia
13 November 2011	Abu Dhabi	United Arab Emirates	Du Arena	—N/a	—N/a	—N/a
Europe
26 November 2011	Bologna	Italy	Unipol Arena	—N/a	—N/a	—N/a
27 November 2011	Milan	Italy	Mediolanum Forum	—N/a	—N/a	—N/a
30 November 2011	Paris	France	Palais Omnisports de Paris-Bercy	—N/a	—N/a	—N/a
1 December 2011	Cologne	Germany	Lanxess Arena	—N/a	—N/a	—N/a
5 December 2011	London	England	The O_{2} Arena	—N/a	14,946 / 16,225	$2,091,580
10 December 2011	Stockholm	Sweden	Ericsson Globe Arena	—N/a	—N/a	—N/a
12 December 2011	Helsinki	Finland	Hartwall Areena	—N/a	—N/a	—N/a
14 December 2011	Moscow	Russia	Olimpiisky Arena	—N/a	—N/a	—N/a
19 December 2011	Manchester	England	Manchester Arena	—N/a	14,800 / 15,288	$1,981,620
20 December 2011	Liverpool	England	Echo Arena Liverpool	—N/a	—N/a	—N/a
24 March 2012	Rotterdam	Netherlands	Rotterdam Ahoy	—N/a	—N/a	—N/a
26 March 2012	Zurich	Switzerland	Hallenstadion	—N/a	—N/a	—N/a
28 March 2012	Antwerp	Belgium	Sportpaleis	—N/a	14,291 / 14,399	$1,912,160
29 March 2012 (Note: This concert was a part of Teenage Cancer Trust.)	London	England	Royal Albert Hall	—N/a	—N/a	—N/a
South America
15 April 2012	Montevideo	Uruguay	Estadio Centenario	—N/a	—N/a	—N/a
17 April 2012	Asunción	Paraguay	Estadio Defensores del Chaco	—N/a	—N/a	—N/a
19 April 2012	Bogotá	Colombia	El Campin Stadium	—N/a	—N/a	—N/a
21 April 2012	Recife	Brazil	Estadio Arruda	—N/a	—N/a	—N/a
22 April 2012	Recife	Brazil	Estadio Arruda	—N/a	—N/a	—N/a
25 April 2012	Florianópolis	Brazil	Estádio da Ressacada	—N/a	—N/a	—N/a
North America
5 May 2012	Guadalajara	Mexico	Estadio Omnilife	—N/a	27,186 / 31,589	$2,866,480
8 May 2012	Mexico City	Mexico	Estadio Azteca	—N/a	53,080 / 57,726	$5,988,030
10 May 2012	Mexico City	Mexico	Zócalo	—N/a	250,000 / 250,000	—N/a
11 November 2012	St. Louis	United States	Scottrade Center	—N/a	—N/a	—N/a
14 November 2012	Houston	United States	Minute Maid Park	—N/a	—N/a	—N/a
25 November 2012	Vancouver	Canada	BC Place	—N/a	—N/a	—N/a
28 November 2012	Edmonton	Canada	Rexall Place	—N/a	—N/a	—N/a
29 November 2012	Edmonton	Canada	Rexall Place	—N/a	—N/a	—N/a

== Setlist ==
Yankee Stadium I, Wrigley Field I, Great American Ball Park, Yas Arena
1. "Hello, Goodbye"
2. "Junior's Farm"
3. "All My Loving"
4. "Jet"
5. "Drive My Car"
6. "Sing the Changes"
7. "The Night Before"
8. "Let Me Roll It" (with "Foxy Lady" coda)
9. "Paperback Writer"
10. "The Long and Winding Road"
11. "Nineteen Hundred and Eighty-Five"
12. "Let 'Em In"
13. "Maybe I'm Amazed"
14. "I've Just Seen a Face"
15. "I Will"
16. "Blackbird"
17. "Here Today"
18. "Dance Tonight"
19. "Mrs Vandebilt"
20. "Eleanor Rigby"
21. "Something"
22. "Band on the Run"
23. "Ob-La-Di, Ob-La-Da"
24. "Back in the U.S.S.R."
25. "I've Got a Feeling"
26. "A Day in the Life/Give Peace a Chance"
27. "Let It Be"
28. "Live and Let Die"
29. "Hey Jude"
  - Encore 1
30. "Lady Madonna"
31. "Day Tripper"
32. "Get Back"
  - Encore 2
33. "Yesterday"
34. "Helter Skelter"
35. "Golden Slumbers/Carry That Weight/The End"
Yankee Stadium II
1. "Magical Mystery Tour"
2. "Jet"
3. "All My Loving"
4. "Junior's Farm"
5. "Drive My Car"
6. "Sing the Changes"
7. "The Night Before"
8. "Let Me Roll It" (with "Foxy Lady" coda)
9. "Paperback Writer"
10. "The Long and Winding Road"
11. "Nineteen Hundred and Eighty-Five"
12. "Let 'Em In"
13. "Maybe I'm Amazed"
14. "I'm Looking Through You"
15. "I Will"
16. "Blackbird"
17. "Here Today"
18. "Dance Tonight"
19. "Mrs Vandebilt"
20. "Eleanor Rigby"
21. "Something"
22. "Band on the Run"
23. "Ob-La-Di, Ob-La-Da"
24. "Back in the U.S.S.R."
25. "I've Got a Feeling"
26. "A Day in the Life/Give Peace a Chance"
27. "Let It Be"
28. "Live and Let Die"
29. "Hey Jude"
  - Encore 1
30. "Lady Madonna"
31. "I Saw Her Standing There" (with Billy Joel)
32. "Get Back"
  - Encore 2
33. "Yesterday"
34. "Helter Skelter"
35. "Golden Slumbers/Carry That Weight/The End"
Comerica Park
1. "Hello, Goodbye"
2. "Junior's Farm"
3. "All My Loving"
4. "Jet"
5. "Drive My Car"
6. "Sing the Changes"
7. "Hitch Hike" (A tribute version of the Marvin Gaye song, after Paul's tour of the Motown Historical Museum before the concert.)
8. "The Night Before"
9. "Let Me Roll It" (with "Foxy Lady" coda)
10. "Paperback Writer"
11. "The Long and Winding Road"
12. "Nineteen Hundred and Eighty-Five"
13. "Let 'Em In"
14. "Maybe I'm Amazed"
15. "I've Just Seen a Face"
16. "I Will"
17. "Blackbird"
18. "Here Today"
19. "Dance Tonight"
20. "Mrs Vandebilt"
21. "Eleanor Rigby"
22. "Something"
23. "Band on the Run"
24. "Ob-La-Di, Ob-La-Da"
25. "Back in the U.S.S.R."
26. "I've Got a Feeling"
27. "A Day in the Life/Give Peace a Chance"
28. "Let It Be"
29. "Live and Let Die"
30. "Hey Jude"
  - Encore 1
31. "Lady Madonna"
32. "Day Tripper"
33. "Get Back"
  - Encore 2
34. "Yesterday"
35. "Helter Skelter"
36. "Golden Slumbers/Carry That Weight/The End"
Bell Centre I
1. "Hello, Goodbye"
2. "Junior's Farm"
3. "All My Loving"
4. "Jet"
5. "Birthday"
6. "Sing the Changes"
7. "The Night Before"
8. "Let Me Roll It" (with "Foxy Lady" coda)
9. "Paperback Writer"
10. "The Long and Winding Road"
11. "Nineteen Hundred and Eighty-Five"
12. "Let 'Em In"
13. "Maybe I'm Amazed"
14. "I'm Looking Through You"
15. "I Will"
16. "Blackbird"
17. "Here Today"
18. "Dance Tonight"
19. "Mrs Vandebilt"
20. "Eleanor Rigby"
21. "Michelle"
22. "Something"
23. "Band on the Run"
24. "Ob-La-Di, Ob-La-Da"
25. "Back in the U.S.S.R."
26. "I've Got a Feeling"
27. "A Day in the Life/Give Peace a Chance"
28. "Let It Be"
29. "Live and Let Die"
30. "Hey Jude"
  - Encore 1
31. "Lady Madonna"
32. "Day Tripper"
33. "Get Back"
  - Encore 2
34. "Yesterday"
35. "Helter Skelter"
36. "Golden Slumbers/Carry That Weight/The End"
Bell Centre II
1. "Magical Mystery Tour"
2. "Junior's Farm"
3. "All My Loving"
4. "Jet"
5. "Got to Get You into My Life"
6. "Sing the Changes"
7. "The Night Before"
8. "Let Me Roll It" (with "Foxy Lady" coda)
9. "Paperback Writer"
10. "The Long and Winding Road"
11. "Nineteen Hundred and Eighty-Five"
12. "Let 'Em In"
13. "Maybe I'm Amazed"
14. "Things We Said Today"
15. "I Will"
16. "Blackbird"
17. "Here Today"
18. "Dance Tonight"
19. "Mrs Vandebilt"
20. "Eleanor Rigby"
21. "Michelle"
22. "Something"
23. "Band on the Run"
24. "Ob-La-Di, Ob-La-Da"
25. "Back in the U.S.S.R."
26. "I've Got a Feeling"
27. "A Day in the Life/Give Peace a Chance"
28. "Let It Be"
29. "Live and Let Die"
30. "Hey Jude"
  - Encore 1
31. "Lady Madonna"
32. "Get Back"
33. "I Saw Her Standing There"
  - Encore 2
34. "Yesterday"
35. "Helter Skelter"
36. "Golden Slumbers/Carry That Weight/The End"
Wrigley Field II
1. "Magical Mystery Tour"
2. "Junior's Farm"
3. "All My Loving"
4. "Jet"
5. "Got to Get You into My Life"
6. "Sing the Changes"
7. "The Night Before"
8. "Let Me Roll It" (with "Foxy Lady" coda)
9. "Paperback Writer"
10. "The Long and Winding Road"
11. "Nineteen Hundred and Eighty-Five"
12. "Let 'Em In"
13. "Maybe I'm Amazed"
14. "I'm Looking Through You"
15. "And I Love Her"
16. "Blackbird"
17. "Here Today"
18. "Dance Tonight"
19. "Mrs Vandebilt"
20. "Eleanor Rigby"
21. "Something"
22. "Band on the Run"
23. "Ob-La-Di, Ob-La-Da"
24. "Back in the U.S.S.R."
25. "I've Got a Feeling"
26. "A Day in the Life/Give Peace a Chance"
27. "Let It Be"
28. "Live and Let Die"
29. "Hey Jude"
  - Encore 1
30. "Lady Madonna"
31. "Birthday"
32. "I Saw Her Standing There"
  - Encore 2
33. "Yesterday"
34. "Helter Skelter"
35. "Golden Slumbers/Carry That Weight/The End"
Unipol Arena, Ericsson Globe
1. "Magical Mystery Tour"
2. "Junior's Farm"
3. "All My Loving"
4. "Jet"
5. "Got to Get You into My Life"
6. "Sing the Changes"
7. "The Night Before"
8. "Let Me Roll It" (with "Foxy Lady" coda)
9. "Paperback Writer"
10. "The Long and Winding Road"
11. "Nineteen Hundred and Eighty-Five"
12. "Come and Get It" (performed by McCartney for the first time ever)
13. "Maybe I'm Amazed"
14. "I'm Looking Through You"
15. "And I Love Her"
16. "Blackbird"
17. "Here Today"
18. "Dance Tonight"
19. "Mrs Vandebilt"
20. "Eleanor Rigby"
21. "Something"
22. "Band on the Run"
23. "Ob-La-Di, Ob-La-Da"
24. "Back in the U.S.S.R."
25. "I've Got a Feeling"
26. "A Day in the Life/Give Peace a Chance"
27. "Let It Be"
28. "Live and Let Die"
29. "Hey Jude"
  - Encore 1
30. "The Word/All You Need Is Love"
31. "Day Tripper"
32. "Get Back"
  - Encore 2
33. "Yesterday"
34. "Helter Skelter"
35. "Golden Slumbers/Carry That Weight/The End"
Mediolanum Arena, Lanxess Arena
1. "Hello, Goodbye"
2. "Junior's Farm"
3. "All My Loving"
4. "Jet"
5. "Drive My Car"
6. "Sing the Changes"
7. "The Night Before"
8. "Let Me Roll It" (with "Foxy Lady" coda)
9. "Paperback Writer"
10. "The Long and Winding Road"
11. "Come and Get It"
12. "Nineteen Hundred and Eighty-Five"
13. "Maybe I'm Amazed"
14. "I've Just Seen a Face"
15. "I Will"
16. "Blackbird"
17. "Here Today"
18. "Dance Tonight"
19. "Mrs Vandebilt"
20. "Eleanor Rigby"
21. "Something"
22. "Band on the Run"
23. "Ob-La-Di, Ob-La-Da"
24. "Back in the U.S.S.R."
25. "I've Got a Feeling"
26. "A Day in the Life/Give Peace a Chance"
27. "Let It Be"
28. "Live and Let Die"
29. "Hey Jude"
  - Encore 1
30. "The Word/All You Need Is Love"
31. "Day Tripper"
32. "Get Back"
  - Encore 2
33. "Yesterday"
34. "Helter Skelter"
35. "Golden Slumbers/Carry That Weight/The End"
Palais Omnisports de Paris-Bercy
1. "Hello, Goodbye"
2. "Junior's Farm"
3. "All My Loving"
4. "Jet"
5. "Drive My Car"
6. "Sing the Changes"
7. "The Night Before"
8. "Let Me Roll It" (with "Foxy Lady" coda)
9. "Paperback Writer"
10. "The Long and Winding Road"
11. "Come and Get It"
12. "Nineteen Hundred and Eighty-Five"
13. "Maybe I'm Amazed"
14. "San Francisco Bay Blues"
15. "I've Just Seen a Face"
16. "I Will"
17. "Blackbird"
18. "Here Today"
19. "Dance Tonight"
20. "Michelle"
21. "Mrs Vandebilt"
22. "Eleanor Rigby"
23. "Something"
24. "Band on the Run"
25. "Ob-La-Di, Ob-La-Da"
26. "Back in the U.S.S.R."
27. "I've Got a Feeling"
28. "A Day in the Life/Give Peace a Chance"
29. "Let It Be"
30. "Live and Let Die"
31. "Hey Jude"
  - Encore 1
32. "The Word/All You Need Is Love"
33. "Day Tripper"
34. "Get Back"
  - Encore 2
35. "Yesterday"
36. "Helter Skelter"
37. "Golden Slumbers/Carry That Weight/The End"
The O2 Arena
1. "Hello, Goodbye"
2. "Junior's Farm"
3. "All My Loving"
4. "Jet"
5. "Drive My Car"
6. "Sing the Changes"
7. "The Night Before"
8. "Let Me Roll It" (with "Foxy Lady" coda)
9. "Paperback Writer"
10. "The Long and Winding Road"
11. "Come and Get It"
12. "Nineteen Hundred and Eighty-Five"
13. "Maybe I'm Amazed"
14. "I've Just Seen a Face"
15. "I Will"
16. "Blackbird"
17. "Here Today"
18. "Dance Tonight"
19. "Mrs Vandebilt"
20. "Eleanor Rigby"
21. "Something"
22. "Band on the Run"
23. "Ob-La-Di, Ob-La-Da"
24. "Back in the U.S.S.R."
25. "I've Got a Feeling"
26. "A Day in the Life/Give Peace a Chance"
27. "Let It Be"
28. "Live and Let Die"
29. "Hey Jude"
  - Encore 1
30. "The Word/All You Need Is Love"
31. "Day Tripper"
32. "Get Back" - Feat. Ronnie Wood (of The Rolling Stones)
  - Encore 2
33. "Yesterday"
34. "Helter Skelter"
35. "Golden Slumbers/Carry That Weight/The End"
Hartwall Areena
1. "Hello, Goodbye"
2. "Junior's Farm"
3. "All My Loving"
4. "Jet"
5. "Drive My Car"
6. "Sing the Changes"
7. "The Night Before"
8. "Let Me Roll It" (with "Foxy Lady" coda)
9. "Paperback Writer"
10. "The Long and Winding Road"
11. "Come and Get It"
12. "Nineteen Hundred and Eighty-Five"
13. "Maybe I'm Amazed"
14. "I've Just Seen a Face"
15. "I Will"
16. "Blackbird"
17. "Here Today"
18. "Dance Tonight"
19. "Mrs Vandebilt"
20. "Eleanor Rigby"
21. "Ram On"
22. "Something"
23. "Band on the Run"
24. "Ob-La-Di, Ob-La-Da"
25. "Back in the U.S.S.R."
26. "I've Got a Feeling"
27. "A Day in the Life/Give Peace a Chance"
28. "Let It Be"
29. "Live and Let Die"
30. "Hey Jude"
  - Encore 1
31. "The Word/All You Need Is Love"
32. "Day Tripper"
33. "Get Back"
  - Encore 2
34. "Yesterday"
35. "Helter Skelter"
36. "Golden Slumbers/Carry That Weight/The End"
Olympijskiy Stadium
1. "Magical Mystery Tour"
2. "Junior's Farm"
3. "All My Loving"
4. "Jet"
5. "Got to Get You into My Life"
6. "Sing the Changes"
7. "The Night Before"
8. "Let Me Roll It" (with "Foxy Lady" coda)
9. "Paperback Writer"
10. "The Long and Winding Road"
11. "Nineteen Hundred and Eighty-Five"
12. "Come and Get It"
13. "Maybe I'm Amazed"
14. "I'm Looking Through You"
15. "And I Love Her"
16. "Blackbird"
17. "Here Today"
18. "Dance Tonight"
19. "Mrs Vandebilt"
20. "Eleanor Rigby"
21. "Something"
22. "Band on the Run"
23. "Ob-La-Di, Ob-La-Da"
24. "Back in the U.S.S.R."
25. "I've Got a Feeling"
26. "A Day in the Life/Give Peace a Chance"
27. "Let It Be"
28. "Live and Let Die"
29. "Hey Jude"
  - Encore 1
30. "The Word/All You Need Is Love"
31. "Day Tripper"
32. "Get Back"
  - Encore 2
33. "Yesterday"
34. "Helter Skelter"
35. "Golden Slumbers/Carry That Weight/The End"
Manchester Arena
1. "Magical Mystery Tour"
2. "Junior's Farm"
3. "All My Loving"
4. "Jet"
5. "Got to Get You into My Life"
6. "Sing the Changes"
7. "The Night Before"
8. "Let Me Roll It" (with "Foxy Lady" coda)
9. "Paperback Writer"
10. "The Long and Winding Road"
11. "Come and Get It"
12. "Nineteen Hundred and Eighty-Five"
13. "Maybe I'm Amazed"
14. "I'm Looking Through You"
15. "And I Love Her"
16. "Blackbird"
17. "Here Today"
18. "Dance Tonight"
19. "Mrs Vandebilt"
20. "Eleanor Rigby"
21. "Ram On"
22. "Something"
23. "Band on the Run"
24. "Ob-La-Di, Ob-La-Da"
25. "Back in the U.S.S.R."
26. "I've Got a Feeling"
27. "A Day in the Life/Give Peace a Chance"
28. "Let It Be"
29. "Live and Let Die"
30. "Hey Jude"
  - Encore 1
31. "The Word/All You Need Is Love"
32. "Wonderful Christmastime"
33. "Day Tripper"
34. "Get Back"
  - Encore 2
35. "Yesterday"
36. "Helter Skelter"
37. "Golden Slumbers/Carry That Weight/The End"
Echo Arena Liverpool
1. "Hello, Goodbye"
2. "Junior's Farm"
3. "All My Loving"
4. "Jet"
5. "Drive My Car"
6. "Sing the Changes"
7. "The Night Before"
8. "Let Me Roll It" (with "Foxy Lady" coda)
9. "Paperback Writer"
10. "The Long and Winding Road"
11. "Come and Get It"
12. "Nineteen Hundred and Eighty-Five"
13. "Maybe I'm Amazed"
14. "I've Just Seen a Face"
15. "I Will"
16. "Blackbird"
17. "Here Today"
18. "Dance Tonight"
19. "Mrs Vandebilt"
20. "Eleanor Rigby"
21. "Ram On"
22. "Something"
23. "Penny Lane"
24. "Band on the Run"
25. "Ob-La-Di, Ob-La-Da"
26. "Back in the U.S.S.R."
27. "I've Got a Feeling"
28. "A Day in the Life/Give Peace a Chance"
29. "Let It Be"
30. "Live and Let Die"
31. "Hey Jude"
  - Encore 1
32. "The Word/All You Need Is Love"
33. "Wonderful Christmastime"
34. "Day Tripper"
35. "Get Back"
  - Encore 2
36. "Yesterday"
37. "Mull of Kintyre"
38. "Helter Skelter"
39. "Golden Slumbers/Carry That Weight/The End"
Rotterdam Ahoy
1. "Hello, Goodbye"
2. "Junior's Farm"
3. "All My Loving"
4. "Venus and Mars/Rock Show"
5. "Jet"
6. "Drive My Car"
7. "Sing the Changes"
8. "The Night Before"
9. "Let Me Roll It" (with "Foxy Lady" coda)
10. "Paperback Writer"
11. "The Long and Winding Road"
12. "Nineteen Hundred and Eighty-Five"
13. "My Valentine"
14. "Maybe I'm Amazed"
15. "I've Just Seen a Face"
16. "I Will"
17. "Blackbird"
18. "Here Today"
19. "Dance Tonight"
20. "Mrs Vandebilt"
21. "Eleanor Rigby"
22. "Ram On"
23. "Something"
24. "Yellow Submarine"
25. "Band on the Run"
26. "Ob-La-Di, Ob-La-Da"
27. "Back in the U.S.S.R."
28. "I've Got a Feeling"
29. "A Day in the Life/Give Peace a Chance"
30. "Let It Be"
31. "Live and Let Die"
32. "Hey Jude"
  - Encore 1
33. "The Word/All You Need Is Love"
34. "Day Tripper"
35. "Get Back"
  - Encore 2
36. "Yesterday"
37. "Helter Skelter"
38. "Golden Slumbers/Carry That Weight/The End"
Hallenstadion
1. "Magical Mystery Tour"
2. "Junior's Farm"
3. "All My Loving"
4. "Jet"
5. "Got to Get You into My Life"
6. "Sing the Changes"
7. "The Night Before"
8. "Let Me Roll It" (with "Foxy Lady" coda)
9. "Paperback Writer"
10. "The Long and Winding Road"
11. "Nineteen Hundred and Eighty-Five"
12. "My Valentine"
13. "Maybe I'm Amazed"
14. "I'm Looking Through You"
15. "And I Love Her"
16. "Blackbird"
17. "Here Today"
18. "Dance Tonight"
19. "Mrs Vandebilt"
20. "Eleanor Rigby"
21. "Something"
22. "Band on the Run"
23. "Ob-La-Di, Ob-La-Da"
24. "Back in the U.S.S.R."
25. "I've Got a Feeling"
26. "A Day in the Life/Give Peace a Chance"
27. "Let It Be"
28. "Live and Let Die"
29. "Hey Jude"
  - Encore 1
30. "The Word/All You Need Is Love"
31. "Day Tripper"
32. "Get Back"
  - Encore 2
33. "Yesterday"
34. "Helter Skelter"
35. "Golden Slumbers/Carry That Weight/The End"
Sportpaleis
1. "Venus and Mars/Rock Show"
2. "Jet"
3. "All My Loving"
4. "Junior's Farm"
5. "Got to Get You into My Life"
6. "Sing the Changes"
7. "The Night Before"
8. "Let Me Roll It" (with "Foxy Lady" coda)
9. "Paperback Writer"
10. "The Long and Winding Road"
11. "Let 'Em In"
12. "My Valentine"
13. "Nineteen Hundred and Eighty-Five"
14. "I'm Looking Through You"
15. "And I Love Her"
16. "Blackbird"
17. "Here Today"
18. "Dance Tonight"
19. "Mrs Vandebilt"
20. "Eleanor Rigby"
21. "Ram On"
22. "Something"
23. "Yellow Submarine"
24. "Band on the Run"
25. "Ob-La-Di, Ob-La-Da"
26. "Back in the U.S.S.R."
27. "I've Got a Feeling"
28. "A Day in the Life/Give Peace a Chance"
29. "Let It Be"
30. "Live and Let Die"
31. "Hey Jude"
  - Encore 1
32. "The Word/All You Need Is Love"
33. "Drive My Car"
34. "Get Back"
  - Encore 2
35. "Yesterday"
36. "Day Tripper"
37. "Golden Slumbers/Carry That Weight/The End"
Royal Albert Hall
1. "Magical Mystery Tour"
2. "Junior's Farm"
3. "All My Loving"
4. "Drive My Car"
5. "Sing the Changes"
6. "The Night Before"
7. "Let Me Roll It" (with "Foxy Lady" coda)
8. "Paperback Writer"
9. "The Long and Winding Road"
10. "Nineteen Hundred and Eighty-Five"
11. "My Valentine"
12. "Maybe I'm Amazed"
13. "I've Just Seen a Face"
14. "Blackbird"
15. "Here Today"
16. "Dance Tonight"
17. "Eleanor Rigby"
18. "Something"
19. "Band on the Run"
20. "Back in the U.S.S.R."
21. "I've Got a Feeling"
22. "Let It Be"
23. "Hey Jude"
  - Encore 1
24. "Day Tripper"
25. "Get Back" (with Roger Daltrey, Ronnie Wood & Paul Weller)
  - Encore 2
26. "Yesterday"
27. "Golden Slumbers/Carry That Weight/The End"
Estadio Centenario
1. "Hello Goodbye"
2. "Junior's Farm"
3. "All My Loving"
4. "Jet"
5. "Got to Get You into My Life"
6. "Sing the Changes"
7. "The Night Before"
8. "Let Me Roll It" (with "Foxy Lady" coda)
9. "Paperback Writer"
10. "The Long and Winding Road"
11. "Nineteen Hundred and Eighty-Five"
12. "My Valentine"
13. "Maybe I'm Amazed"
14. "I'm Looking Through You"
15. "Two of Us"
16. "Blackbird"
17. "Here Today"
18. "Dance Tonight"
19. "Mrs Vandebilt"
20. "Eleanor Rigby"
21. "Something"
22. "Band on the Run"
23. "Ob-La-Di, Ob-La-Da"
24. "Back in the U.S.S.R."
25. "I've Got a Feeling"
26. "A Day in the Life/Give Peace a Chance"
27. "Let It Be"
28. "Live and Let Die"
29. "Hey Jude"
  - Encore 1
30. "Lady Madonna"
31. "Day Tripper"
32. "Get Back"
  - Encore 2
33. "Yesterday"
34. "Helter Skelter"
35. "Golden Slumbers/Carry That Weight/The End"
Estadio Defensores del Chaco, Estádio do Arruda I, Minute Maid Park
1. "Magical Mystery Tour"
2. "Junior's Farm"
3. "All My Loving"
4. "Jet"
5. "Got to Get You into My Life"
6. "Sing the Changes"
7. "The Night Before"
8. "Let Me Roll It" (with "Foxy Lady" coda)
9. "Paperback Writer"
10. "The Long and Winding Road"
11. "Nineteen Hundred and Eighty-Five"
12. "My Valentine"
13. "Maybe I'm Amazed"
14. "Things We Said Today"
15. "And I Love Her"
16. "Blackbird"
17. "Here Today"
18. "Dance Tonight"
19. "Mrs Vandebilt"
20. "Eleanor Rigby"
21. "Something"
22. "Band on the Run"
23. "Ob-La-Di, Ob-La-Da"
24. "Back in the U.S.S.R."
25. "I've Got a Feeling"
26. "A Day in the Life/Give Peace a Chance"
27. "Let it Be"
28. "Live and Let Die"
29. "Hey Jude"
  - Encore 1
30. "Lady Madonna"
31. "Day Tripper"
32. "Get Back"
  - Encore 2
33. "Yesterday"
34. "Helter Skelter"
35. "Golden Slumbers/Carry That Weight/The End"
Estadio El Campín
1. "Magical Mystery Tour"
2. "Junior's Farm"
3. "All My Loving"
4. "Jet"
5. "Got to Get You into My Life"
6. "Sing the Changes"
7. "The Night Before"
8. "Let Me Roll It" (with "Foxy Lady" coda)
9. "Paperback Writer"
10. "The Long and Winding Road"
11. "Nineteen Hundred and Eighty-Five"
12. "My Valentine"
13. "Maybe I'm Amazed"
14. "Things We Said Today"
15. "Hope of Deliverance"
16. "And I Love Her"
17. "Blackbird"
18. "Here Today"
19. "Dance Tonight"
20. "Mrs Vandebilt"
21. "Eleanor Rigby"
22. "Something"
23. "Band on the Run"
24. "Ob-La-Di, Ob-La-Da"
25. "Back in the U.S.S.R."
26. "I've Got a Feeling"
27. "A Day in the Life/Give Peace a Chance"
28. "Let It Be"
29. "Live and Let Die"
30. "Hey Jude"
  - Encore 1
31. "Lady Madonna"
32. "Day Tripper"
33. "Get Back"
  - Encore 2
34. "Yesterday"
35. "Helter Skelter"
36. "Golden Slumbers/Carry That Weight/The End"
Estádio do Arruda II
1. "Hello, Goodbye"
2. "Junior's Farm"
3. "All My Loving"
4. "Jet"
5. "Drive My Car"
6. "Sing the Changes"
7. "The Night Before"
8. "Let Me Roll It" (with "Foxy Lady" coda)
9. "Paperback Writer"
10. "The Long and Winding Road"
11. "Nineteen Hundred and Eighty-Five"
12. "My Valentine"
13. "Maybe I'm Amazed"
14. "I've Just Seen a Face"
15. "And I Love Her"
16. "Blackbird"
17. "Here Today"
18. "Dance Tonight"
19. "Mrs Vandebilt"
20. "Eleanor Rigby"
21. "Something"
22. "Band on the Run"
23. "Ob-La-Di, Ob-La-Da"
24. "Back in the U.S.S.R."
25. "I've Got a Feeling"
26. "A Day in the Life/Give Peace a Chance"
27. "Let It Be"
28. "Live and Let Die"
29. "Hey Jude"
  - Encore 1
30. "Lady Madonna"
31. "Day Tripper"
32. "Get Back"
  - Encore 2
33. "Yesterday"
34. "I Saw Her Standing There"
35. "Golden Slumbers/Carry That Weight/The End"
Estádio da Ressacada
1. "Magical Mystery Tour"
2. "Junior's Farm"
3. "All My Loving"
4. "Jet"
5. "Drive My Car"
6. "Sing the Changes"
7. "The Night Before"
8. "Let Me Roll It" (with "Foxy Lady" coda)
9. "Paperback Writer"
10. "The Long and Winding Road"
11. "Nineteen Hundred and Eighty-Five"
12. "My Valentine"
13. "Maybe I'm Amazed"
14. "I've Just Seen a Face"
15. "Hope of Deliverance"
16. "And I Love Her"
17. "Blackbird"
18. "Here Today"
19. "Dance Tonight"
20. "Mrs Vandebilt"
21. "Eleanor Rigby"
22. "Ram On"
23. "Something"
24. "Yellow Submarine"
25. "Band on the Run"
26. "Ob-La-Di, Ob-La-Da"
27. "Back in the U.S.S.R."
28. "I've Got a Feeling"
29. "A Day in the Life/Give Peace a Chance"
30. "Let It Be"
31. "Live and Let Die"
32. "Hey Jude"
  - Encore 1
33. "Lady Madonna"
34. "Day Tripper"
35. "Get Back"
  - Encore 2
36. "Yesterday"
37. "Birthday"
38. "I Saw Her Standing There"
39. "Golden Slumbers/Carry That Weight/The End"
Estadio Omnilife
1. "Magical Mystery Tour"
2. "Junior's Farm"
3. "All My Loving"
4. "Jet"
5. "Drive My Car"
6. "Sing the Changes"
7. "The Night Before"
8. "Let Me Roll It" (with "Foxy Lady" coda)
9. "Paperback Writer"
10. "The Long and Winding Road"
11. "Nineteen Hundred and Eighty-Five"
12. "My Valentine"
13. "Maybe I'm Amazed"
14. "I've Just Seen a Face"
15. "Hope of Deliverance"
16. "And I Love Her"
17. "Blackbird"
18. "Here Today"
19. "Dance Tonight"
20. "Every Night"
21. "Mrs Vandebilt"
22. "Eleanor Rigby"
23. "Something"
24. "Things We Said Today"
25. "Band on the Run"
26. "Ob-La-Di, Ob-La-Da"
27. "Back in the U.S.S.R."
28. "I've Got a Feeling"
29. "A Day in the Life/Give Peace a Chance"
30. "Let It Be"
31. "Live and Let Die"
32. "Hey Jude"
  - Encore 1
33. "Lady Madonna"
34. "Day Tripper"
35. "Get Back"
  - Encore 2
36. "Yesterday"
37. "I Saw Her Standing There"
38. "Golden Slumbers/Carry That Weight/The End"
Estadio Azteca
1. "Magical Mystery Tour"
2. "Junior's Farm"
3. "All My Loving"
4. "Jet"
5. "Got to Get You into My Life"
6. "Sing the Changes"
7. "The Night Before"
8. "Let Me Roll It" (with "Foxy Lady" coda)
9. "Paperback Writer"
10. "The Long and Winding Road"
11. "Nineteen Hundred and Eighty-Five"
12. "My Valentine"
13. "Maybe I'm Amazed"
14. "I'm Looking Through You"
15. "Hope of Deliverance"
16. "And I Love Her"
17. "Blackbird"
18. "Here Today"
19. "Dance Tonight"
20. "Every Night"
21. "Mrs Vandebilt"
22. "Eleanor Rigby"
23. "Something"
24. "Band on the Run"
25. "Ob-La-Di, Ob-La-Da"
26. "Back in the U.S.S.R."
27. "I've Got a Feeling"
28. "A Day in the Life/Give Peace a Chance"
29. "Let It Be"
30. "Live and Let Die"
31. "Hey Jude"
  - Encore 1
32. "Lady Madonna"
33. "Day Tripper"
34. "Get Back"
  - Encore 2
35. "Yesterday"
36. "I Saw Her Standing There"
37. "Golden Slumbers/Carry That Weight/The End"
Zócalo
1. "Hello Goodbye"
2. "Junior's Farm"
3. "All My Loving"
4. "Jet"
5. "Drive My Car"
6. "Sing the Changes"
7. "The Night Before"
8. "Let Me Roll It" (with "Foxy Lady" coda)
9. "Paperback Writer"
10. "The Long and Winding Road"
11. "Nineteen Hundred and Eighty-Five"
12. "My Valentine"
13. "Maybe I'm Amazed"
14. "I've Just Seen a Face"
15. "Hope of Deliverance"
16. "And I Love Her"
17. "Blackbird"
18. "Here Today"
19. "Dance Tonight"
20. "Every Night"
21. "Mrs Vandebilt"
22. "Eleanor Rigby"
23. "Something"
24. "Band on the Run"
25. "Ob-La-Di, Ob-La-Da" (with "Mariachi")
26. "Birthday"
27. "Back in the U.S.S.R."
28. "I've Got a Feeling"
29. "A Day in the Life/Give Peace a Chance"
30. "Let It Be"
31. "Live and Let Die"
32. "Hey Jude"
  - Encore 1
33. "Lady Madonna"
34. "Day Tripper"
35. "Get Back"
  - Encore 2
36. "Yesterday"
37. "Helter Skelter"
38. "Golden Slumbers/Carry That Weight/The End"
Scottrade Center
1. "Magical Mystery Tour"
2. "Junior's Farm"
3. "All My Loving"
4. "Jet"
5. "Drive My Car"
6. "Sing the Changes"
7. "The Night Before"
8. "Let Me Roll It" (with "Foxy Lady" coda)
9. "Paperback Writer"
10. "The Long and Winding Road"
11. "Nineteen Hundred and Eighty-Five"
12. "My Valentine"
13. "Maybe I'm Amazed"
14. "I've Just Seen a Face"
15. "And I Love Her"
16. "Blackbird"
17. "Here Today"
18. "Dance Tonight"
19. "Mrs Vandebilt"
20. "Eleanor Rigby"
21. "Something"
22. "Band on the Run"
23. "Ob-La-Di, Ob-La-Da"
24. "Back in the U.S.S.R."
25. "I've Got a Feeling"
26. "A Day in the Life/Give Peace a Chance"
27. "Let It Be"
28. "Live and Let Die"
29. "Hey Jude"
  - Encore 1
30. "Lady Madonna"
31. "Birthday"
32. "Day Tripper"
33. "Get Back"
  - Encore 2
34. "Yesterday"
35. "Helter Skelter"
36. "Golden Slumbers/Carry That Weight/The End"
BC Place Stadium
1. "Magical Mystery Tour"
2. "Junior's Farm"
3. "All My Loving"
4. "Jet"
5. "Drive My Car"
6. "Sing the Changes"
7. "The Night Before"
8. "Let Me Roll It" (with "Foxy Lady" coda)
9. "Paperback Writer"
10. "The Long and Winding Road"
11. "Nineteen Hundred and Eighty-Five"
12. "My Valentine"
13. "Maybe I'm Amazed"
14. "I've Just Seen a Face"
15. "And I Love Her"
16. "Blackbird"
17. "Here Today"
18. "Dance Tonight"
19. "Mrs Vandebilt"
20. "Eleanor Rigby"
21. "Something"
22. "Band on the Run"
23. "Ob-La-Di, Ob-La-Da"
24. "Back in the U.S.S.R."
25. "I've Got a Feeling"
26. "A Day in the Life/Give Peace a Chance"
27. "Let It Be"
28. "Live and Let Die"
29. "Hey Jude"
  - Encore 1
30. "Lady Madonna"
31. "Day Tripper"
32. "Get Back"
  - Encore 2
33. "Yesterday"
34. "Mull of Kintyre" (with the Delta Police Pipe and Drums Marching Band)
35. "Helter Skelter"
36. "Golden Slumbers/Carry That Weight/The End"
Rexall Place I
1. "Magical Mystery Tour"
2. "Junior's Farm"
3. "All My Loving"
4. "Jet"
5. "Got to Get You into My Life"
6. "Sing the Changes"
7. "The Night Before"
8. "Let Me Roll It" (with "Foxy Lady" ending)
9. "Paperback Writer"
10. "The Long and Winding Road"
11. "Nineteen Hundred and Eighty-Five"
12. "My Valentine"
13. "Maybe I'm Amazed"
14. "I've Just Seen a Face"
15. "And I Love Her"
16. "Blackbird"
17. "Here Today"
18. "Dance Tonight"
19. "Mrs Vandebilt"
20. "Eleanor Rigby"
21. "Something"
22. "Band on the Run"
23. "Ob-La-Di, Ob-La-Da"
24. "Back in the U.S.S.R."
25. "I've Got a Feeling"
26. "A Day in the Life/Give Peace a Chance"
27. "Let It Be"
28. "Live and Let Die"
29. "Hey Jude"
  - Encore 1
30. "Lady Madonna"
31. "Day Tripper"
32. "Get Back"
  - Encore 2
33. "Yesterday"
34. "Mull of Kintyre" (with the Pipes and Drums of the Edmonton Police Service)
35. "Golden Slumbers/Carry That Weight/The End"
Rexall Place II
1. "Hello, Goodbye"
2. "Junior's Farm"
3. "All My Loving"
4. "Jet"
5. "Drive My Car"
6. "Sing the Changes"
7. "The Night Before"
8. "Let Me Roll It" (with "Foxy Lady" coda)
9. "Paperback Writer"
10. "The Long and Winding Road"
11. "Nineteen Hundred and Eighty-Five"
12. "My Valentine"
13. "Maybe I'm Amazed"
14. "I've Just Seen a Face"
15. "And I Love Her"
16. "Blackbird"
17. "Here Today"
18. "Dance Tonight"
19. "Mrs Vandebilt"
20. "Eleanor Rigby"
21. "Something"
22. "Band on the Run"
23. "Ob-La-Di, Ob-La-Da"
24. "Back in the U.S.S.R."
25. "I've Got a Feeling"
26. "A Day in the Life/Give Peace a Chance"
27. "Let It Be"
28. "Live and Let Die"
29. "Hey Jude"
  - Encore 1
30. "Lady Madonna"
31. "Wonderful Christmastime"
32. "Day Tripper"
33. "Get Back"
  - Encore 2
34. "Yesterday"
35. "Mull of Kintyre" (with the Edmonton Police Pipe Band)
36. "Golden Slumbers/Carry That Weight/The End"

== Instruments played by band members ==
Songs	McCartney	Anderson	Ray	Wickens	Laboriel
"Hello Goodbye" or "Magical Mystery Tour"	Bass	Electric Guitar	Electric Guitar	Keyboards	Drums
"Junior's Farm"	Bass	Electric Guitar	Electric Guitar	Keyboards	Drums
"All My Loving"	Bass	Electric Guitar	Electric Guitar	Electric Guitar	Drums
"Jet"	Bass	Electric Guitar	Electric Guitar	Keyboards	Drums
"Drive My Car" or "Got to Get You into My Life"	Bass	Electric Guitar	Electric Guitar	Keyboards	Drums
"Sing the Changes"	Bass	Electric Guitar	Acoustic Guitar	Keyboards	Drums
"The Night Before"	Bass	Electric Guitar	Electric Guitar	Keyboards	Drums
"Let Me Roll It"	Electric Guitar	Electric Guitar	Bass	Keyboards	Drums
"Paperback Writer"	Electric Guitar	Electric Guitar	Bass	Keyboards	Drums
"The Long and Winding Road"	Piano	Electric Guitar	Bass	Keyboards	Drums
"Nineteen Hundred and Eighty Five"	Piano	Electric Guitar	Bass	Keyboards/Maracas	Drums
"Let 'Em In" or "Come and Get It" or "My Valentine"	Piano	Electric Guitar or Acoustic Guitar	Bass	Keyboards	Drums
"Maybe I'm Amazed"	Piano	Electric Guitar	Bass	Keyboards	Drums
"I've Just Seen a Face" or "I'm Looking Through You" or "Things We Said Today"	Acoustic Guitar	Acoustic Guitar	Bass	Shaker or Tambourine/Keyboards or Acoustic Guitar	Drums
"Hope of Deliverance" (only in Bogota, Florianopolis and Mexico)	Acoustic Guitar	Acoustic Guitar	Acoustic Guitar	Acoustic Guitar	Bass
"And I Love Her" or "I Will"	Acoustic Guitar	Acoustic Guitar	Bass	Claves or Acoustic Guitar	Drums
"Blackbird"	Acoustic Guitar	None	None	None	None
"Here Today"	Acoustic Guitar	None	None	None	None
"Dance Tonight"	Mandolin	Electric Guitar	Bass	Keyboards	Drums
"Every Night" (only in Mexico)	Acoustic Guitar	Electric Guitar	Bass	Keyboards	Drums
"Mrs. Vandebilt"	Acoustic Guitar	Electric Guitar	Bass	Keyboards	Drums
"Eleanor Rigby"	Acoustic Guitar	None	None	Keyboards	None
"Michelle" (only in Montreal and Paris)	Acoustic Guitar	Acoustic Guitar	Bass	Keyboards	Drums
"Ram On" (only in some cities)	Ukulele	Electric Guitar	Bass	Keyboards	Drums
"Something"	Ukulele/Acoustic Guitar	Electric Guitar	Bass	Keyboards	Drums
"Yellow Submarine" (only in Rotterdam, Antwerp and Florianopolis)	Acoustic Guitar	Electric Guitar	Bass	Keyboards	Drums
"Band on the Run"	Bass	Electric Guitar	Electric Guitar/Acoustic Guitar	Keyboards	Drums
"Ob-La-Di Ob-La-Da"	Bass	Electric Guitar	Acoustic Guitar	Keyboards	Drums
"Back in the U.S.S.R."	Bass	Electric Guitar	Electric Guitar	Keyboards	Drums
"I've Got a Feeling"	Electric Guitar	Electric Guitar	Bass	Keyboards	Drums
"A Day in the Life"/"Give Peace a Chance"	Bass	Acoustic Guitar	Acoustic Guitar	Keyboards	Drums
"Let It Be"	Piano	Electric Guitar	Bass	Keyboards	Drums
"Live and Let Die"	Piano	Electric Guitar	Bass	Keyboards	Drums
"Hey Jude"	Piano	Electric Guitar	Bass	Keyboards	Drums
"Lady Madonna" or "The Word"/"All You Need Is Love"	Piano or Bass	Electric Guitar	Bass or Electric Guitar	Keyboards	Drums
"Day Tripper"	Bass	Electric Guitar	Electric Guitar	Tambourine	Drums
"Get Back"	Bass	Electric Guitar	Electric Guitar	Keyboards	Drums
"Yesterday"	Acoustic Guitar	None	None	Keyboards	None
"Helter Skelter"	Bass	Electric Guitar	Electric Guitar	Electric Guitar	Drums
"Golden Slumbers"/"Carry That Weight"/"The End"	Piano/Electric Guitar	Electric Guitar	Bass/Electric Guitar	Keyboards	Drums

== See also ==
- List of Paul McCartney concert tours
