= Out There (tour) =

2013–15 concert tour by Paul McCartney

- World tour by Paul McCartney
- Location: Asia • Europe • North America • South America
- Associated album: New
- Start date: 4 May 2013
- End date: 22 October 2015
- Legs: 14
- No. of shows: 91
- Box office: $275 million

Paul McCartney concert chronology
- On the Run (2011–12); Out There (2013–15); One on One (2016–17)

Out There was a concert tour by English singer-songwriter Paul McCartney lasting from 4 May 2013 to 22 October 2015. Some notable nights of the tour included concerts at Warsaw's National Stadium, Verona's Roman Amphitheatre, and Vienna's Happel Stadium, the latter of which he would play for the first time since 2003's Back in the World tour. McCartney played in Belo Horizonte, Cariacica, Goiânia and Fortaleza, all in Brazil (his first time playing in all four cities) and in Japan for the first time since the Driving World Tour back in 2002.

The setlist for Out There included songs by McCartney's former bands the Beatles and Wings, along with songs from his solo career. Following the release of McCartney's solo album New in October 2013, the songs "New" and "Queenie Eye" were added to the setlist.

== Background ==
The first official show announced for this tour was a show in Warsaw, Poland. In this announcement, a statement stated that the "Out There! Tour" will "see McCartney and his band travel the world throughout the year, even visiting some places they've never been before." At the press conference for the Brazilian shows, the manager of the Brazilian leg explained that the "Out There! Tour" will feature a new lighting rig, a platform to carry McCartney into the audience, and new songs into McCartney's live repertoire. The tour's announcement was taken at an unusual pace. Rather than announcing the full tour in bulk, each show was announced individually at different dates and times. This gave each venue an opportunity to be exposed in the spotlight. The production was teased in rehearsal photos leaked online, and later released on McCartney's website before the first show in Brazil. These photos displayed elements of the production including a scissor-lift platform that carried McCartney six metres (20 feet) into the air, and the use of laser lights. The first show revealed new video graphics and a stage floor consisting of illuminated LED panels.

=== In South America ===
McCartney being swarmed with grasshoppers in Goiânia.

After much success in Latin America during the Up and Coming and On the Run tours, a petition was started in the town of Belo Horizonte for McCartney to perform in the city. An announcement from PaulMcCartney.com listed three Brazilian shows to begin his 2013 tour. The tour started on 4 May 2013 in Belo Horizonte, Brazil and continued to Goiânia and Fortaleza. This marked his first time performing in all three cities. McCartney was greeted on arrival with billboards across the town of Belo Horizonte welcoming him to the city. Fans were camped outside of the stadium for days to earn a good spot for his show.

On the first night of the tour, McCartney played several Beatles songs live for the first time: "Eight Days a Week", "Your Mother Should Know", "All Together Now", "Being for the Benefit of Mr. Kite!" and "Lovely Rita". This show was performed to a sold-out crowd of 55,000 fans. As a sign of appreciation during "Hey Jude", fans held up signs that read "Thank You" to McCartney after responding to their petition.

At the next show in Goiânia, the stage was swarmed with grasshoppers. The Esperanca Grilo, which translates to the Hope Grasshopper, swarmed the stage, equipment, and even the band and crew during the show. McCartney made notation of the grasshoppers during "Hey Jude", as he sang the line "The movement you need is on your shoulder", turning to his shoulder, singing to the grasshoppers.

Nearly four months after the last show in Japan, McCartney decided to extend the tour during 2014, by announcing a new South American leg, which started in Montevideo, Uruguay, travelling then to Santiago, Chile, to continue after with a show in Lima, Peru, and another in Quito, Ecuador, this being McCartney's first ever show in the country.

=== In Europe ===
The announcement of the first show of the tour came on 20 March 2013. With the headline "Paul McCartney Is Getting 'Out There!'" a performance was listed for Warsaw, Poland at the Stadion Narodowy. This performance on 22 June 2013 marked McCartney's first ever performance in the country of Poland. In the hours following this announcement, a second European show for Vienna, Austria was listed for 27 June 2013. This concert at the Ernst Happel Stadion was his fourth ever concert in Vienna and his first since 2003 during the Back in the World tour. A third European show for 2013 was announced on 26 March 2013, to take place at the Arena di Verona in Verona, Italy for his first Verona performance.

=== In North America ===
Within the announcements of the extension of the tour during 2014, on 13 March, McCartney announced his first ever concert in Costa Rica.

McCartney commanding a sea of fans at Bonnaroo 2013.

McCartney's first live information for 2013 was announced on 19 February 2013. In a special webcast announcing the 2013 Bonnaroo Music and Arts Festival, McCartney was confirmed as a headliner of the festival in Manchester, Tennessee. McCartney's specific date and set time was announced 1 May 2013. McCartney took the stage for this performance on 14 June 2013, with a two and a half hour set. Following the announcements of shows in Europe and South America, and Bonnaroo, a show for Boston's Fenway Park was announced for 9 July 2013. This was his first show at Fenway Park since two performances there in 2009. Following the Boston date were shows in Austin, Texas at the Frank Erwin Center for McCartney's Austin debut, Washington, D.C. for his first performance at Nationals Park, a return to the BOK Center in Tulsa, Oklahoma. Shortly after the previous announcements came the confirmation of his first performances in Memphis, Tennessee and Orlando, Florida since his 1993 New World Tour, at the FedExForum and Amway Center respectively. A performance for Seattle's Safeco Field was added to the tour, marking the first major performance at the park.

McCartney also played at Bankers Life Fieldhouse in Indianapolis on 14 July 2013. Due to popular demand, a second show was booked for Orlando, Austin, and Tulsa. A much rumoured show at Miller Park in Milwaukee was confirmed on 15 April 2013. This performance of 16 July was his first show in Milwaukee since 2005, and his first concert at Miller Park. In a video released on 16 April 2013 by the Outside Lands Music and Arts Festival, McCartney was named as a headliner of the festival. It was later announced on 24 June that McCartney would headline on Friday, 9 August 2013. This will be his first performance in California since his 2010 performance at AT&T Park in San Francisco.

On 18 April 2013, it was announced that McCartney would take the stage for the first time at the Barclays Center in New York City on 8 and 10 June for a return to New York since his highly successful Yankee Stadium shows in 2011 and the 12-12-12: The Concert for Sandy Relief appearance. With mostly American dates announced, in mid April, McCartney announced his first Canadian dates of 2013. Shows at the Investors Group Field in Winnipeg, Mosaic Stadium at Taylor Field in Regina, and the Scotiabank Place (to be renamed "Canadian Tire Centre" days prior to the show) in Ottawa were all announced on 22 April 2013, just hours apart from each other. This is to be McCartney's first performances in Ottawa and Regina, and a return to Winnipeg since 1993. On 25 April 2013, McCartney announced a return to the Plains of Abraham in Quebec City from his concert celebrating the city's 400th anniversary. The show was played on 23 July 2013.

Many shows on the tour had anomalies from the average stage show, making them highlights. The first show in Orlando featured "Hope of Deliverance" in the set which was played in the prior Brazil leg of the tour. This was the only time the song was performed in North America this year as it was usually replaced by either "I've Just Seen a Face" or "Things We Said Today" for the remainder of the tour. The second night in Orlando saw the tour debut of "I Saw Her Standing There" in place of "Get Back". These two songs would usually alternate between shows. At Bonnaroo, which was the largest attendance crowd on the tour, McCartney performed "Midnight Special" because of lyrics referring to nearby Nashville. The show in Ottawa brought the tour debuts of the songs "Michelle" and "Mull of Kintyre" to the setlist. "Mull of Kintyre" was performed with the full Ottawa Police Service Pipe Band. In Seattle, McCartney brought onstage the remaining members of Nirvana – Dave Grohl, Krist Novoselic, plus their touring musician Pat Smear – to perform their collaborative effort "Cut Me Some Slack" from Grohl's movie Sound City. The three continued onstage with McCartney and the band to finish the encore, which included the first performance of "Long Tall Sally" since 1986. "Birthday" was performed for the first time on the tour at the Plains of Abraham show, which also featured "Michelle". At Outside Lands, McCartney replaced "All My Loving" with "Magical Mystery Tour" early in the show. He also performed "San Francisco Bay Blues" and dedicated that song to both "Shelly" and the city of San Francisco. During the encore, McCartney brought the Kronos Quartet, who had already performed with The National earlier in the day, onstage with him and Wickens to perform "Yesterday". "Mull of Kintyre" at the next show in Winnipeg was performed with the City of Winnipeg Police Pipe Band. In Regina, SK, the City of Regina Pipe Band joined McCartney for this number.

McCartney entered 2014 with more access to his fans via the social media app Instagram. After already having used this app to announce and promote shows in Asia and Latin America, McCartney used the app as one of his main ways of announcing shows. He would often post when a series of dates were announced, putting a hashtag (#) with each city he would play. The first announcement appeared on Instagram as well as several other social media outlets on 8 April. The cities were New Orleans, Louisville, Albany, and Pittsburgh at the Smoothie King Center, Yum! Center, Times Union Center, and the Consol Energy Center respectively. McCartney visited Louisville and Albany for the first time, and returning to New Orleans for the first time since 2002, and Pittsburgh since 2010. Another announcement came on 16 April which reported McCartney's first show in Lubbock at the United Supermarkets Arena in homage to his boyhood idol Buddy Holly, his return to Dallas and Atlanta since 2009 at the American Airlines Center and the Philips Arena respectively, his first full headlining show in Jacksonville at the Jacksonville Veterans Memorial Arena having only played during the Super Bowl XXXIX halftime in 2005 and the Beatles only Floridian concert in 1964, and McCartney's return to the Bridgestone Arena in Nashville, and the EnergySolutions Arena in Salt Lake City from his visits during his 2010 Up and Coming Tour. Midwestern United States shows were announced on 21 April at the United Center in Chicago after a couple of shows at the historic Wrigley Field in 2011, McCartney's first appearance in Fargo and Lincoln at the Fargodome and Pinnacle Bank Arena respectively, a return to the Sprint Center in Kansas City from 2010, and a concert at Target Field in Minneapolis for McCartney's first Twin Cities show since 2005. This was followed by his first-ever appearance in Missoula, Montana, announced on 28 April along with a concert date in Phoenix, where he had previously performed in 2010. A historic return and final concert for McCartney at Candlestick Park in San Francisco was announced on 24 April after months of rumours and even a pledge from the mayor of San Francisco himself. McCartney performed in San Francisco last exactly a year and a day prior to the Candlestick Park date, at the Outside Lands Music and Arts Festival in 2013. This is a notable venue seeing as it held the final official Beatles concert in history. An announcement for a show at Dodger Stadium in Los Angeles came a day later. This will be another historic concert as the Beatles played their second to final official concert at the stadium in 1966, the day before the Candlestick Park farewell. It will be the first McCartney event in Southern California since the duo of shows at the Hollywood Bowl in Los Angeles during the 2010 Up and Coming tour. After the cancellation of the entire 2014 Asian leg of the tour, McCartney later postponed all June 2014 shows to October of that year.

On 25 February 2015, PaulMcCartney.com confirmed the rumours that McCartney would headline the Firefly Music Festival on Friday 19 June 2015.

McCartney announced his first non-festival US date for 2015 on 24 April. The show was performed at the Wells Fargo Center in Philadelphia on 21 June. This was his first trip to Philadelphia since his Up and Coming Tour on 14 and 15 August 2010. On 28 April 2015 South Carolina governor Nikki Haley announced that McCartney was coming to Columbia, South Carolina. On 25 June 2015 during his stop in Columbia, South Carolina, McCartney dedicated "The Long and Winding Road" to the ones who died in the Charleston, South Carolina church shooting.

The tour itself concluded in October 2015 after a series of five shows in the Great Lakes region of the United States and Canada.

=== In Asia ===
Almost exactly 11 years to the day since McCartney last embarked on a run of shows in Japan during the Driving World Tour, November 2013 saw him bring his Out There! Tour to Japan to play six shows in Osaka, Fukuoka and Tokyo. The news was announced on 16 July 2013 on his official website. The first date will take place in Osaka on 11 November and the tour will continue on the Fukuoka Dome on 15 November. A run of shows at the Tokyo Dome followed, taking place on 18, 19, 21 November. On 26 March 2014, McCartney announced three new shows in Japan, playing this time in stadiums on the same cities, adding later his first show ever in South Korea, but when arriving to Japan, he came down with a virus that forced him to postpone, and then cancel all the Asian leg shows.

In 2015, the cancelled Asian leg shows were rescheduled. The first show was held in Osaka on 21 April 2015. At the Tokyo Dome, there were three shows on 23, 25, 27 April. On 28 April, the show continued on the Budokan, where the Beatles held their concert in 1966.

On 28 April 2015 at the Nippon Budokan, Tokyo, Japan, McCartney performed live "Another Girl" (the fifth song from the Beatles' Help! album) for the first time ever by a Beatle. At the same show, he performed live the song "Dance Tonight" for the first time since 2012.

On 2 May 2015 at the Seoul Olympic Stadium, South Korea, accompanying himself with his Hofner bass guitar, McCartney played and sang with the audience a reprise of "Hey Jude" for the first time ever.

== Tour dates ==
List of concerts, showing date, city, country, venue, tickets sold, number of available tickets and amount of gross revenue
Date	City	Country	Venue	Attendance	Revenue
South America
4 May 2013	Belo Horizonte	Brazil	Estádio Mineirão	51,621 / 51,621	$6,290,700
6 May 2013	Goiânia	Brazil	Estádio Serra Dourada	42,514 / 42,514	$4,214,890
9 May 2013	Fortaleza	Brazil	Estádio Castelão	48,668 / 48,668	$5,436,730
North America
18 May 2013	Orlando	United States	Amway Center	26,261 / 26,775	$3,798,540
19 May 2013	Orlando	United States	Amway Center	26,261 / 26,775	$3,798,540
22 May 2013	Austin	United States	Frank Erwin Center	25,487 / 25,840	$3,890,013
23 May 2013	Austin	United States	Frank Erwin Center	25,487 / 25,840	$3,890,013
26 May 2013	Memphis	United States	FedExForum	13,562 / 13,562	$2,012,584
29 May 2013	Tulsa	United States	BOK Center	26,827 / 26,827	$3,382,796
30 May 2013	Tulsa	United States	BOK Center	26,827 / 26,827	$3,382,796
8 June 2013	Brooklyn	United States	Barclays Center	29,898 / 29,898	$5,189,250
10 June 2013	Brooklyn	United States	Barclays Center	29,898 / 29,898	$5,189,250
14 June 2013 (Note: The show on 14 June 2013 in Manchester was part of the Bonnaroo Music & Arts Festival.)	Manchester	United States	Great Stage Park	—N/a	—N/a
Europe
22 June 2013	Warsaw	Poland	Stadion Narodowy	—N/a	—N/a
25 June 2013	Verona	Italy	Roman Amphitheatre	—N/a	—N/a
27 June 2013	Vienna	Austria	Ernst-Happel-Stadion	—N/a	—N/a
North America
7 July 2013	Ottawa	Canada	Scotiabank Place	14,379 / 14,388	$2,068,790
9 July 2013	Boston	United States	Fenway Park	36,278 / 36,393	$5,211,572
12 July 2013	Washington, D.C.	United States	Nationals Park	39,515 / 39,515	$4,452,036
14 July 2013	Indianapolis	United States	Bankers Life Fieldhouse	14,784 / 14,784	$1,885,141
16 July 2013	Milwaukee	United States	Miller Park	43,747 / 43,747	$4,114,943
19 July 2013	Seattle	United States	Safeco Field	45,229 / 45,229	$4,525,200
23 July 2013	Quebec City	Canada	Plains of Abraham	—N/a	—N/a
9 August 2013 (Note: The show on 9 August 2013 in San Francisco was part of the Outside Lands Music and Arts Festival.)	San Francisco	United States	Golden Gate Park	—N/a	—N/a
12 August 2013	Winnipeg	Canada	Investors Group Field	30,149 / 30,149	$4,079,490
14 August 2013	Regina	Canada	Mosaic Stadium at Taylor Field	38,750 / 38,750	$4,553,590
Asia
11 November 2013	Osaka	Japan	Kyocera Dome	71,320 / 74,974	$11,611,700
12 November 2013	Osaka	Japan	Kyocera Dome	71,320 / 74,974	$11,611,700
15 November 2013	Fukuoka	Japan	Yafuoku! Dome	34,525 / 34,525	$5,593,970
18 November 2013	Tokyo	Japan	Tokyo Dome	146,845 / 146,845	$23,493,800
19 November 2013	Tokyo	Japan	Tokyo Dome	146,845 / 146,845	$23,493,800
21 November 2013	Tokyo	Japan	Tokyo Dome	146,845 / 146,845	$23,493,800
South America
19 April 2014	Montevideo	Uruguay	Estadio Centenario	—N/a	—N/a
22 April 2014	Santiago	Chile	Movistar Arena	—N/a	—N/a
23 April 2014 (Note: The concert of 23 April 2014 in Santiago, Chile at the Movistar Arena was originally planned to take place on 21 April but was rescheduled due to delayed flight carrying technical equipment.)	Santiago	Chile	Movistar Arena	—N/a	—N/a
25 April 2014	Lima	Peru	Estadio Nacional	20,481 / 41,466	$2,776,690
28 April 2014	Quito	Ecuador	Estadio de Liga	—N/a	—N/a
North America
1 May 2014	San José	Costa Rica	Estadio Nacional	27,001 / 35,228	$2,477,140
5 July 2014	Albany	United States	Times Union Center	13,044 / 13,044	$2,110,984
7 July 2014	Pittsburgh	United States	Consol Energy Center	15,003 / 15,003	$2,247,429
9 July 2014	Chicago	United States	United Center	15,776 / 15,776	$2,551,520
12 July 2014	Fargo	United States	Fargodome	18,220 / 18,220	$2,247,472
14 July 2014	Lincoln	United States	Pinnacle Bank Arena	13,983 / 13,983	$2,178,832
16 July 2014	Kansas City	United States	Sprint Center	14,421 / 14,421	$2,314,540
2 August 2014	Minneapolis	United States	Target Field	43,143 / 43,143	$4,949,623
5 August 2014	Missoula	United States	Washington–Grizzly Stadium	25,192 / 25,192	$3,775,111
7 August 2014	Salt Lake City	United States	EnergySolutions Arena	15,064 / 15,064	$2,001,260
10 August 2014	Los Angeles	United States	Dodger Stadium	52,605 / 52,605	$5,211,134
12 August 2014	Phoenix	United States	US Airways Center	14,035 / 14,035	$2,143,968
14 August 2014	San Francisco	United States	Candlestick Park	53,477 / 53,477	$7,023,107
28 September 2014	San Diego	United States	Petco Park	45,352 / 45,352	$4,968,567
2 October 2014 (Note: The concert of 2 October 2014 in Lubbock, Texas at the United Supermarkets Arena was originally planned to take place on 14 June but was rescheduled due to illness.)	Lubbock	United States	United Supermarkets Arena	11,446 / 11,446	$1,820,456
11 October 2014 (Note: The concert of 11 October 2014 in New Orleans at The Smoothie King Center was originally planned to take place on 19 June but was rescheduled due to illness.)	New Orleans	United States	Smoothie King Center	14,931 / 14,931	$2,178,726
13 October 2014 (Note: The concert of 13 October 2014 in Dallas, Texas at the American Airlines Center was originally planned to take place on 16 June but was rescheduled due to illness.)	Dallas	United States	American Airlines Center	14,916 / 14,916	$2,302,579
15 October 2014 (Note: The concert of 15 October 2014 in Atlanta, Georgia at the Philips Arena was originally planned to take place on 21 June but was rescheduled due to illness.)	Atlanta	United States	Philips Arena	13,044 / 13,044	$2,016,129
16 October 2014 (Note: The concert of 16 October 2014 in Nashville, Tennessee at the Bridgestone Arena was originally planned to take place on 25 June but was rescheduled due to illness.)	Nashville	United States	Bridgestone Arena	14,832 / 14,832	$2,320,689
25 October 2014 (Note: The concert of 25 October 2014 in Jacksonville, Florida at the Jacksonville Veterans Memorial Arena was originally planned to take place on 22 June but was rescheduled due to illness.)	Jacksonville	United States	Jacksonville Veterans Memorial Arena	12,398 / 12,398	$2,042,584
28 October 2014 (Note: The concert of 28 October 2014 in Louisville, Kentucky at the KFC Yum! Center was originally planned to take place on 26 June but was rescheduled due to illness.)	Louisville	United States	KFC Yum! Center	17,611 / 17,611	$2,533,185
30 October 2014	Greensboro	United States	Greensboro Coliseum	15,992 / 15,992	$2,352,299
South America
10 November 2014	Cariacica	Brazil	Estádio Kléber Andrade	—N/a	—N/a
12 November 2014	Rio de Janeiro	Brazil	HSBC Arena	—N/a	—N/a
23 November 2014	Brasília	Brazil	Estádio Nacional de Brasília	—N/a	—N/a
25 November 2014	São Paulo	Brazil	Allianz Parque	—N/a	—N/a
26 November 2014	São Paulo	Brazil	Allianz Parque	—N/a	—N/a
Asia
21 April 2015	Osaka	Japan	Kyocera Dome	38,517 / 38,517	$5,616,936
23 April 2015	Tokyo	Japan	Tokyo Dome	149,117 / 149,117	$21,746,535
25 April 2015	Tokyo	Japan	Tokyo Dome	149,117 / 149,117	$21,746,535
27 April 2015	Tokyo	Japan	Tokyo Dome	149,117 / 149,117	$21,746,535
28 April 2015	Tokyo	Japan	Nippon Budokan	11,833 / 11,833	$6,878,517
2 May 2015	Seoul	South Korea	Seoul Olympic Stadium	38,212 / 38,212	$4,249,207
Europe
23 May 2015	London	England	The O_{2} Arena	31,146 / 31,422	$4,002,240
24 May 2015	London	England	The O_{2} Arena	31,146 / 31,422	$4,002,240
27 May 2015	Birmingham	England	Barclaycard Arena	10,840 / 10,840	$1,645,850
28 May 2015	Liverpool	England	Echo Arena Liverpool	9,274 / 9,274	$1,630,760
5 June 2015	Marseille	France	Nouveau Stade Vélodrome	—N/a	—N/a
7 June 2015	Amsterdam	Netherlands	Ziggo Dome	30,040 / 33,700	$3,596,828
8 June 2015	Amsterdam	Netherlands	Ziggo Dome	30,040 / 33,700	$3,596,828
11 June 2015	Saint-Denis	France	Stade de France	—N/a	—N/a
North America
19 June 2015 (Note: The show on 19 June 2015 in Dover was part of the Firefly Music Festival.)	Dover	United States	Woodlands of Dover International Speedway	—N/a	—N/a
21 June 2015	Philadelphia	United States	Wells Fargo Center	15,669 / 15,669	$2,695,337
23 June 2015	Charlottesville	United States	John Paul Jones Arena	12,974 / 12,974	$2,024,000
25 June 2015	Columbia	United States	Colonial Life Arena	13,551 / 13,551	$2,185,147
Europe
4 July 2015 (Note: The show on 4 July 2015 in Roskilde was part of the Roskilde Festival.)	Roskilde	Denmark	Festivalpladsen	—N/a	—N/a
7 July 2015	Oslo	Norway	Telenor Arena	—N/a	—N/a
9 July 2015	Stockholm	Sweden	Tele2 Arena	—N/a	—N/a
North America
31 July 2015 (Note: The show on 31 July 2015 in Chicago is part of the Lollapalooza Festival.)	Chicago	United States	Grant Park	—N/a	—N/a
13 October 2015	Columbus	United States	Nationwide Arena	15,107 / 15,107	$2,498,770
15 October 2015	University Park	United States	Bryce Jordan Center	12,525 / 12,525	$2,040,691
17 October 2015	Toronto	Canada	Air Canada Centre	16,640 / 16,640	$2,481,120
21 October 2015	Detroit	United States	Joe Louis Arena	—N/a	—N/a
22 October 2015	Buffalo	United States	First Niagara Center	15,552 / 15,552	$2,755,354
Total				1,671,677 / 1,705,709 (97.9%)	$275,700,000

== Set list ==
=== Average set list ===
1. "Eight Days a Week" or "Magical Mystery Tour"
2. "Save Us"++ or "Junior's Farm"+
3. "All My Loving" or "Another Girl"+++ or "Can't Buy Me Love"+++ or "Got to Get You Into My Life"+++
4. "Listen to What the Man Said" or "Good Day Sunshine"+++ or "Jet" or "One After 909"
5. "Temporary Secretary"+++
6. "Let Me Roll It"
7. "Paperback Writer"
8. "My Valentine"
9. "Nineteen Hundred and Eighty-Five"
10. "The Long and Winding Road"
11. "Maybe I'm Amazed"
12. "I've Just Seen a Face" or "I'm Looking Through You"+++ or "Things We Said Today" or "Hope of Deliverance"
13. "We Can Work It Out"
14. "Another Day"
15. "Hope for the Future"+++
16. "And I Love Her"
17. "Blackbird"
18. "Here Today"
19. "New"++ or "Your Mother Should Know"+
20. "Queenie Eye"++
21. "Lady Madonna"
22. "All Together Now"
23. "Lovely Rita"
24. "Everybody Out There"++ (not played in all cities) or "Mrs. Vandebilt"+
25. "Eleanor Rigby"
26. "Being for the Benefit of Mr. Kite!"
27. "Something"
28. "Ob-La-Di, Ob-La-Da"
29. "Band on the Run"
30. "Back in the U.S.S.R."
31. "Let It Be"
32. "Live and Let Die"
33. "Hey Jude"
  - Encore 1
34. "Day Tripper" or "Another Girl"+++
35. "Hi, Hi, Hi" or "Birthday"
36. "Get Back" or "I Saw Her Standing There" or "Can't Buy Me Love"+++
  - Encore 2
37. "Yesterday"
38. "Helter Skelter"
39. "Golden Slumbers"/"Carry That Weight"/"The End"
- + Performed before the release of New
- ++ Performed since the release of New
- +++ Performed in 2015

=== Other set lists ===
Bonnaroo Music & Arts Festival
1. "Eight Days a Week"
2. "Junior's Farm"
3. "All My Loving"
4. "Listen to What the Man Said"
5. "Let Me Roll It"
6. "Paperback Writer"
7. "My Valentine"
8. "Nineteen Hundred and Eighty-Five"
9. "The Long and Winding Road"
10. "Maybe I'm Amazed"
11. "Midnight Special"
12. "We Can Work It Out"
13. "Another Day"
14. "And I Love Her"
15. "Blackbird"
16. "Here Today"
17. "Your Mother Should Know"
18. "Lady Madonna"
19. "All Together Now"
20. "Lovely Rita"
21. "Mrs. Vandebilt"
22. "Eleanor Rigby"
23. "Being for the Benefit of Mr. Kite!"
24. "Something"
25. "Ob-La-Di, Ob-La-Da"
26. "Band on the Run"
27. "Back in the U.S.S.R."
28. "Let It Be"
29. "Live and Let Die"
30. "Hey Jude"
  - Encore 1
31. "Day Tripper"
32. "Hi, Hi, Hi"
33. "Get Back"
  - Encore 2
34. "Yesterday"
35. "Helter Skelter"
36. "Golden Slumbers"/"Carry That Weight"/"The End"
Plains of Abraham
1. "Eight Days a Week"
2. "Junior's Farm"
3. "All My Loving"
4. "Listen to What the Man Said"
5. "Let Me Roll It"
6. "Paperback Writer"
7. "My Valentine"
8. "Nineteen Hundred and Eighty-Five"
9. "The Long and Winding Road"
10. "Maybe I'm Amazed"
11. "I've Just Seen a Face"
12. "We Can Work It Out"
13. "Another Day"
14. "And I Love Her"
15. "Blackbird"
16. "Here Today"
17. "Your Mother Should Know"
18. "Lady Madonna"
19. "All Together Now"
20. "Michelle"
21. "Lovely Rita"
22. "Mrs. Vandebilt"
23. "Eleanor Rigby"
24. "Being for the Benefit of Mr. Kite!"
25. "Ram On"
26. "Something"
27. "Ob-La-Di, Ob-La-Da"
28. "Band on the Run"
29. "Back in the U.S.S.R."
30. "Let It Be"
31. "Live and Let Die"
32. "Hey Jude"
  - Encore 1
33. "Day Tripper"
34. "Hi, Hi, Hi"
35. "Birthday"
36. "Get Back"
  - Encore 2
37. "Yesterday"
38. "Helter Skelter"
39. "Golden Slumbers"/"Carry That Weight"/"The End"
Outside Lands Festival
1. "Eight Days a Week"
2. "Junior's Farm"
3. "Magical Mystery Tour"
4. "Listen to What the Man Said"
5. "Let Me Roll It"
6. "Paperback Writer"
7. "My Valentine"
8. "Nineteen Hundred and Eighty-Five"
9. "The Long and Winding Road"
10. "Maybe I'm Amazed"
11. "I've Just Seen a Face"
12. "San Francisco Bay Blues"
13. "We Can Work It Out"
14. "Another Day"
15. "And I Love Her"
16. "Blackbird"
17. "Here Today"
18. "Your Mother Should Know"
19. "Lady Madonna"
20. "All Together Now"
21. "Lovely Rita"
22. "Mrs. Vandebilt"
23. "Eleanor Rigby"
24. "Being for the Benefit of Mr. Kite!"
25. "Something"
26. "Ob-La-Di, Ob-La-Da"
27. "Band on the Run"
28. "Back in the U.S.S.R."
29. "Let It Be"
30. "Live and Let Die"
31. "Hey Jude"
  - Encore 1
32. "Day Tripper"
33. "Hi, Hi, Hi"
34. "Get Back"
  - Encore 2
35. "Yesterday"
36. "Helter Skelter"
37. "Golden Slumbers"/"Carry That Weight"/"The End"
Nippon Budokan
1. "Can't Buy Me Love"
2. "Save Us"
3. "All My Loving"
4. "One After 909"
5. "Let Me Roll It"
6. "Paperback Writer"
7. "My Valentine"
8. "Nineteen Hundred and Eighty-Five"
9. "Maybe I'm Amazed"
10. "I've Just Seen a Face"
11. "Another Day"
12. "Dance Tonight"
13. "We Can Work It Out"
14. "And I Love Her"
15. "Blackbird"
16. "New"
17. "Lady Madonna"
18. "Another Girl"
19. "Got to Get You Into My Life"
20. "Being for the Benefit of Mr. Kite!"
21. "Ob-La-Di, Ob-La-Da"
22. "Back in the U.S.S.R."
23. "Let It Be"
24. "Live and Let Die"
25. "Hey Jude"
  - Encore
26. "Yesterday"
27. "Birthday"
28. "Golden Slumbers"/"Carry That Weight"/"The End"
Firefly Music Festival
1. "Birthday"
2. "Save Us"
3. "Got to Get You Into My Life"
4. "Let Me Roll It"
5. "Paperback Writer"
6. "My Valentine"
7. "Nineteen Hundred and Eighty-Five"
8. "The Long and Winding Road"
9. "Maybe I'm Amazed"
10. "I've Just Seen a Face"
11. "We Can Work It Out"
12. "Another Day"
13. "And I Love Her"
14. "Blackbird"
15. "Here Today"
16. "New"
17. "Queenie Eye"
18. "Lady Madonna"
19. "Eleanor Rigby"
20. "Being for the Benefit of Mr. Kite!"
21. "Something"
22. "Ob-La-Di, Ob-La-Da"
23. "Band on the Run"
24. "Back in the U.S.S.R."
25. "Let It Be"
26. "Live and Let Die"
27. "Hey Jude"
  - Encore
28. "Hi, Hi, Hi"
29. "Can't Buy Me Love"
30. "Helter Skelter"
31. "Golden Slumbers"/"Carry That Weight"/"The End"
Roskilde Festival
1. "Magical Mystery Tour"
2. "Save Us"
3. "Got to Get You Into My Life"
4. "Good Day Sunshine"
5. "Temporary Secretary"
6. "Let Me Roll It"
7. "Paperback Writer"
8. "My Valentine"
9. "Nineteen Hundred and Eighty-Five"
10. "The Long and Winding Road"
11. "Maybe I'm Amazed"
12. "I've Just Seen a Face"
13. "We Can Work It Out"
14. "Another Day"
15. "Hope for the Future"
16. "And I Love Her"
17. "Blackbird"
18. "Here Today"
19. "New"
20. "Queenie Eye"
21. "Lady Madonna"
22. "All Together Now"
23. "Lovely Rita"
24. "Eleanor Rigby"
25. "Being for the Benefit of Mr. Kite!"
26. "Something"
27. "Ob-La-Di, Ob-La-Da"
28. "Band on the Run"
29. "Back in the U.S.S.R."
30. "Let It Be"
31. "Live and Let Die"
32. "Hey Jude"
  - Encore
33. "Another Girl"
34. "Hi, Hi, Hi"
35. "Can't Buy Me Love"
36. "Helter Skelter"
37. "Golden Slumbers"/"Carry That Weight"/"The End"
Lollapalooza
1. "Magical Mystery Tour"
2. "Save Us"
3. "Got to Get You Into My Life"
4. "Let Me Roll It"
5. "Paperback Writer"
6. "My Valentine"
7. "Nineteen Hundred and Eighty-Five"
8. "Maybe I'm Amazed"
9. "I've Just Seen a Face"
10. "FourFiveSeconds"
11. "We Can Work It Out"
12. "And I Love Her"
13. "Blackbird"
14. "Here Today"
15. "Queenie Eye"
16. "Lady Madonna"
17. "Eleanor Rigby"
18. "Being for the Benefit of Mr. Kite!"
19. "Something"
20. "Ob-La-Di, Ob-La-Da"
21. "Band on the Run"
22. "Back in the U.S.S.R."
23. "Let It Be"
24. "Live and Let Die"
25. "Hey Jude"
  - Encore
26. "Hi, Hi, Hi"
27. "Can't Buy Me Love"
28. "Get Back"
29. "Helter Skelter"
30. "Golden Slumbers"/"Carry That Weight"/"The End"

== See also ==
- List of Paul McCartney concert tours
