= In My Life (George Martin album) =

Studio album by George Martin
- Released: 20 October 1998
- Recorded: March – August 1997
- Genre: Rock
- Length: 43:58
- Label: MCA (US), The Echo Label
- Producer: George Martin
- Compiler: George Martin

George Martin chronology
| Beatles to Bond and Bach (1978) | In My Life (1998) | Produced by George Martin (2001) |

In My Life is a 1998 album compiled and produced by George Martin. It consists almost entirely of cover versions of The Beatles songs which Martin produced originally, together with one original composition "Friends and Lovers".

Jeff Beck's version of "A Day in the Life" was nominated for the Grammy Award for Best Pop Instrumental Performance in 2000.

== Reception ==
Professional ratings
Review scores
| Source | Rating |
|---|---|
| Allmusic | 3/5 stars |
| PopMatters | 2/10 stars |

Writing for Allmusic, music critic Cub Koda wrote "The results are in the true George Martin orchestrated tradition, with several interesting twists and turns along the way." Conversely, Sarah Zupko of PopMatters wrote Martin "has chosen to go out with a whimper instead of a bang" and of the album in general; "I don’t really have to tell you that Goldie Hawn impersonating a chanteuse on “A Hard Day’s Night” or Sean Connery literally reading “In My Life” is an embarrassing display, do I?"

== Track listing ==
All songs by John Lennon and Paul McCartney, except where noted.

1. "Come Together" – 4:37
  - Featuring Robin Williams and Bobby McFerrin on vocals
2. "A Hard Day's Night" – 3:24
  - Featuring Goldie Hawn on keyboards and vocals
3. "A Day in the Life" – 4:44
  - An instrumental version, featuring Jeff Beck on guitar
4. "Here, There and Everywhere" – 3:18
  - Featuring Céline Dion on vocals
5. "Because" – 3:18
  - Featuring Vanessa-Mae on violin
6. "I Am the Walrus" – 4:31
  - Featuring Jim Carrey on vocals
7. "Here Comes the Sun" (George Harrison) – 3:30
  - Featuring guitarist John Williams
8. "Being for the Benefit of Mr. Kite!" – 2:58
  - Featuring Billy Connolly on vocals
9. "The Pepperland Suite" (George Martin) – 6:19
  - A new medley of the music that originally appeared in the 1969 film and album Yellow Submarine
10. "Golden Slumbers"/"Carry That Weight"/"The End" – 5:38
  - Featuring Phil Collins on drums, percussion and vocals
11. "Friends and Lovers" (George Martin) – 2:24
12. "In My Life" – 2:29
  - Featuring Sean Connery on lead spoken word vocal
13. "Ticket to Ride" – 3:56
  - Featuring the Meninas Cantoras de Petrópolis on vocals, only included in the South American release
14. "Blackbird" – 2:59
  - Featuring Bonnie Pink on keyboards and vocals, only included in the Japanese release

== Charts ==
=== Weekly charts ===
| Chart (1998) | Peak position |
|---|---|
| Australian Albums (ARIA) | 7 |
| Dutch Albums (Album Top 100) | 73 |
| New Zealand Albums (RMNZ) | 3 |
| Scottish Albums (OCC) | 16 |
| UK Albums (OCC) | 5 |

=== Year-end charts ===
| Chart (1998) | Position |
|---|---|
| Australian Albums (ARIA) | 93 |
| UK Albums (OCC) | 94 |
