= The Night Before (song) =

1965 song by the Beatles

- Sheet music cover

Song by the Beatles

from the album Help!
- Released: 6 August 1965
- Recorded: 17 February 1965
- Studio: EMI, London
- Genre: Pop rock; rock and roll
- Length: 2:33
- Label: Parlophone
- Songwriter: Lennon–McCartney
- Producer: George Martin

"The Night Before" is a song by the English rock band the Beatles from their 1965 film Help! and soundtrack album of the same name. It was written primarily by Paul McCartney and credited to the Lennon–McCartney partnership. Described as a pop rock or rock and roll song, its lyrics reflect on the singer's last night with his lover before being abandoned.

Recorded in February 1965, "The Night Before" was the first Beatles song to feature electric piano, played by John Lennon. Its film sequence was shot the following May, showing the band miming to the track on Salisbury Plain. The Beatles performed the song live only once, during their final BBC Radio performance. In contemporary interviews, McCartney said that it was one of his favourite songs from the Help! film and one of the Beatles' best recordings up to that point. Critics have given it mixed reviews, with some praising it while others dismiss it as insignificant. Many fans consider it one of the Beatles' best early songs. George Martin, Herbie Mann, Josie Cotton and Restless Heart are among the artists who have covered it.

== Background and recording ==
Neither Paul McCartney nor John Lennon had strong memories about writing "The Night Before". Although the song is credited to the Lennon–McCartney songwriting partnership, both identified it as being written primarily by McCartney. McCartney recalled writing it at the apartment of his then girlfriend Jane Asher and her family, at 57 Wimpole Street in central London.

The Beatles recorded "The Night Before" on 17 February 1965 during the third session for the soundtrack of their second feature film, Help!, in which they also recorded George Harrison's song "You Like Me Too Much". Recording in EMI's Studio Two, George Martin produced the session, assisted by engineers Norman Smith and Ken Scott. The band achieved a satisfactory basic track in two takes, featuring McCartney singing and playing bass, Ringo Starr on drums, Harrison playing rhythm guitar on his Gretsch Tennessean, and Lennon playing a Hohner Pianet electric piano, the first time the instrument was used on a Beatles recording.

The band overdubbed several parts onto take two. McCartney double-tracked his vocal, Lennon and Harrison added backing vocals, Starr added maracas to the bridge, (Note: Walter Everett identifies the percussion instrument as maracas, as do Jean-Michael Guesdon & Phillipe Margotin. Tim Riley, however, writes that it is a tambourine, while Ian MacDonald says it is "unidentified".) and McCartney and Harrison – the former of whom using his new Epiphone Casino (Note: Kenneth Womack claims that "The Night Before" was the first Beatles song to feature the Casino; however, Everett writes that the guitar was also used on "Ticket to Ride" and "Another Girl", recorded over the previous two days.) – played a dual guitar solo, doubling each other in octaves. (Note: George Martin's memoir All You Need Is Ears indicates that only Harrison contributed lead guitar to the track, while Barry Miles writes in his biography Many Years from Now that McCartney played the solo. Other authors, including John C. Winn and Guesdon & Margotin, write that they both played the solo in octaves, which Lennon also stated in a contemporary interview with Melody Maker.) McCartney was pleased with the final recording, telling Melody Maker, "that sound was one of the best [we] had got on record, instrumentally."

On 18 February 1965, Martin, Smith and Scott mixed the song for mono in the control room of Studio Two. Smith and engineer Malcolm Davies remixed it for stereo on 23 February. On 18 April in EMI's Room 65, another stereo remix was made by Martin, Smith, and Phil McDonald for the film company United Artists, but it was never used.

== Composition ==
"The Night Before" has been described as a pop rock or rock and roll song that also draws from blues and R&B. (Note: Rolling Stone cites "The Night Before" as the best example of the Beatles' influence of Motown.) It is mainly in the key of D major, with a brief modulation to G major in the bridge, and is in common time. According to music scholar Terence J. O'Grady, the "most notable" element of the song's composition is the I–♭VII–IV–V chord progression used in the verses, as the Beatles had never used it before despite it being very popular among their contemporaries. The melody in the verses is shared between the lead and backing vocal parts, a technique musicologist Alan W. Pollack likens to a hocket and biographer Jonathan Gould says prefigures the "increasingly complex and conversational" vocal arrangements in the Beatles' later songs. O'Grady writes that the verse's "blueslike intensity" is contrasted by the more complex melody in the bridge, which peaks with a high A note on the line, "It makes me wanna cry".

Lyrically, Gould writes that "The Night Before" relates to "the age-old pop theme of an overnight change of heart", with the singer reflecting on the previous night before his lover left him. Music journalist Steve Turner suggests that this may have been inspired by McCartney's tumultuous relationship with Asher. Pollack writes that the song is comparable to "Yesterday" – written by McCartney around the same time – in that both protagonists wish to reverse their relationships by one day; however, while "Yesterday" expresses "grim resignation, ["The Night Before"] openly begs for another chance." Writer Kevin Courrier compares the song with a contemporaneous song by Lennon, "Yes It Is", noting that "where Lennon wishes to rid himself of memories of loss ... McCartney wants to hold on to the happy thoughts of the night before, even if it means he's being abandoned."

== Film sequence ==
The Beatles performing the song in Help!; Lennon is playing the same Hohner Pianet used on the track.

"The Night Before" was one of seven songs selected by director Richard Lester for use in Help! The song's film sequence was shot over 3–5 May 1965 and consists of the band miming to the track on Salisbury Plain. The scene depicts an outdoor recording session, with a makeshift control booth and recording equipment set up in an open field. The film's premise involves Starr being targeted for assassination by a cult. In line with this, the Beatles perform the song under protection of the British 3rd Royal Tank Regiment, surrounded by soldiers and Centurion tanks. "She's a Woman" is also used in the scene, as the character Ahme is shown attempting to trick the cultists by playing it on an underground tape recorder surrounded by dynamite. The two songs alternate with respect to the film's action. As "The Night Before" finishes, the dynamite explodes and the band runs for cover.

== Release and reception ==
Help! premiered in the United Kingdom on 29 July 1965, and EMI's Parlophone label released the soundtrack LP on 6 August. "The Night Before" appeared on side one along with the seven other tracks from the film, sequenced between "Help!" and "You've Got to Hide Your Love Away". On 13 August, Capitol released the North American version of the album, with the song sequenced between "Help!" and "From Me To You Fantasy" from Ken Thorne's score. In a contemporary interview, McCartney said that "The Night Before" was one of his favourite songs from the film and that the band struggled deciding whether it or "Ticket to Ride" should have been the lead single.

Critically, Beatles biographer Hunter Davies evaluates "The Night Before" as a "middling" song that "critics have had little to say about, not seeing much to praise, or much to attack". In his book Revolution in the Head, Ian MacDonald criticizes the song's musical and lyrical content as "only fair mainstream pop of its period." Mark Hertsgaard dismisses it as a "throwaway" while Patrick Humphries and Peter Doggett deem Lennon's use of electric piano to be the only novel element of the song. Conversely, Richie Unterberger of AllMusic considers "The Night Before" to be a "first-rate romantic pop-rock song" and Kevin Courrier praises it as one of McCartney's underappreciated compositions. Rolling Stone ranked it at number 49 in a list of the 100 greatest Beatles songs, the editors writing: "For any other band, a pop gem as magnificent as 'The Night Before' would have turned into a career-making hit single, if not the foundation of a legend. But for the Beatles, it was just another great album track". The song has also been reappraised by fans as one of the Beatles' best early songs, with a 2014 readers' poll conducted by the magazine ranking it their ninth best song from before Rubber Soul.

== Other versions ==
British law in the 1960s compelled BBC Radio to play material recorded especially for the medium. In keeping with this practice, the Beatles recorded their only live rendition of "The Night Before" for the BBC Light Programme The Beatles (Invite You to Take a Ticket to Ride) on 26 May 1965. As well as being the band's last performance for a music programme, it was their only BBC session to feature electric piano, used on "The Night Before" along with "Dizzy Miss Lizzy". Of the songs performed during this session, EMI only included "Dizzy Miss Lizzy" and "Ticket to Ride" on the 1994 album Live at the BBC, although the entire broadcast has appeared on bootlegs.

George Martin recorded an instrumental version of the song for his 1965 easy listening album, George Martin and His Orchestra Play Help! American jazz flautist Herbie Mann covered "The Night Before" and "Yesterday" for his 1966 album Today! New wave singer Josie Cotton recorded a cover of "The Night Before" in 1986 – featuring vocals from Stray Cats guitarist Brian Setzer – for her album Everything Is Oh Yeah, which went unreleased until 2019. Country band Restless Heart covered the song for their 2004 reunion album Still Restless, with music critic Al Campbell opining that it "sounds more like mid-'70s America than the Fab Four."

McCartney first performed "The Night Before" in concert during his On the Run tour, beginning on 15 July 2011 at Yankee Stadium. Thomas Connor of the Chicago Sun-Times described it as one of "several unexpected cuts" from the tour, while Bernard Perusse of the Montreal Gazette wrote that its inclusion appealed to "real Beatle geeks" and drew "delighted gasps" from the audience.

== Personnel ==
According to Ian MacDonald unless stated otherwise:

- Paul McCartney – double-tracked lead vocals, bass, lead guitar
- John Lennon – electric piano, harmony vocals
- George Harrison – rhythm guitar, lead guitar, harmony vocals
- Ringo Starr – drums, maracas

== Bibliography ==
- Castleman, Harry; Podrazik, Walter J. (1976). All Together Now: The First Complete Beatles Discography, 1961–1975. New York, NY: Ballantine Books. ISBN 978-0-345-25680-5.
- Coleman, Ray (27 February 1965). "Here we go again". Melody Maker.
- Courrier, Kevin (2009). Artificial Paradise: The Dark Side of the Beatles' Utopian Dream. Westport, CT: Praeger. ISBN 978-0-313-34586-9.
- Davies, Hunter (2014). The Beatles Lyrics: The Stories Behind the Music, Including the Handwritten Drafts of More Than 100 Classic Beatles Songs. New York, NY: Little, Brown and Company. ISBN 978-0-316-24716-0.
- Davies, Hunter (2016). The Beatles Book. London: Ebury Press. ISBN 978-0-09-195861-9.
- Everett, Walter (2001). The Beatles as Musicians: The Quarry Men through Rubber Soul. New York, NY: Oxford University Press. ISBN 978-0-19-514105-4.
- Fremaux, Stephanie (2018). The Beatles on Screen: From Pop Stars to Musicians. New York, NY: Bloomsbury Academic. ISBN 978-1-5013-2716-2.
- Gould, Jonathan (2007). Can't Buy Me Love: The Beatles, Britain, and America. New York, NY: Three Rivers Press. ISBN 978-0-307-35337-5.
- Guesdon, Jean-Michel; Margotin, Philippe (2013). All the Songs: The Story Behind Every Beatles Release. New York, NY: Black Dog & Leventhal Publishers. ISBN 978-1-57912-952-1.
- Halpin, Brooke (2017). Experiencing the Beatles: A Listener's Companion. Lanham, MD: Rowman & Littlefield. ISBN 978-1-4422-7144-9.
- Hertsgaard, Mark (1995). A Day in the Life: The Music and Artistry of the Beatles. New York, NY: Delacorte Press. ISBN 978-0-385-31377-3.
- Humphries, Patrick; Doggett, Peter (2010). The Beatles: The Music and the Myth. London: Omnibus Press. ISBN 978-0-85712-361-9.
- Lenhoff, Alan S.; Robertson, David E. (2019). Classic Keys: Keyboard sounds that launched rock music. University of North Texas Press. ISBN 978-1-57441-786-9.
- Lewisohn, Mark (1988). The Complete Beatles Recording Sessions. New York, NY: Harmony Books. ISBN 978-0-600-63561-1.
- Lewisohn, Mark (1992). The Complete Beatles Chronicle: The Only Definitive Guide to the Beatles' Entire Career. London: Hamlyn. ISBN 978-0-517-58100-1.
- MacDonald, Ian (2007). Revolution in the Head: The Beatles' Records and the Sixties (Third ed.). Chicago Review Press. ISBN 978-1-55652-733-3.
- Martin, George; Hornsby, Jeremy (1979). All You Need Is Ears. New York, NY: St. Martin's Press. ISBN 978-0-312-02043-9.
- Miles, Barry (1997). Paul McCartney: Many Years From Now. New York, NY: Henry Holt. ISBN 978-0-8050-5248-0.
- Miles, Barry (2002). The Beatles: A Diary – An Intimate Day by Day History. London: Omnibus Press. ISBN 978-0-7119-9196-5.
- Neaverson, Bob (1997). The Beatles Movies. London: Cassell. ISBN 978-0-304-33797-2.
- Norman, Philip (1981). Shout!: The Beatles in Their Generation. New York, NY: MJF Books. ISBN 978-1-56731-087-0.
- O'Grady, Terence J. (1983). The Beatles: A Musical Evolution. Boston: Twayne. ISBN 978-0-8057-9453-3.
- Riley, Tim (2002) [1988]. Tell Me Why: The Beatles: Album by Album, Song by Song, the Sixties and After (Revised and Updated ed.). Cambridge, MA: Da Capo Press. ISBN 978-0-306-81120-3.
- Schaffner, Nicholas (1978). The Beatles Forever. Harrisburg, PA: Cameron House. ISBN 978-0-07-055087-2.
- Sheff, David (2000) [1981]. Golson, G. Barry (ed.). All We Are Saying: The Last Major Interview with John Lennon and Yoko Ono. New York, NY: St. Martin's Griffin. ISBN 978-0-312-25464-3.
- Turner, Steve (2009) [1994]. A Hard Day's Write: The Stories Behind Every Beatles' Song (New, updated ed.). London: Carlton Books. ISBN 978-1-84732-458-0.
- Turner, Steve (2015). The complete Beatles songs: The stories behind every track written by the Fab Four. London: Carlton Books. ISBN 978-1-78097-711-9.
- Winn, John C. (2008). Way Beyond Compare: The Beatles' Recorded Legacy, Volume One, 1957–1965. New York, NY: Three Rivers Press. ISBN 978-0-307-45157-6.
- Womack, Kenneth, ed. (2009). "Beatles Discography, 1962–1970". The Cambridge Companion to the Beatles. Cambridge University Press. pp. 286–293. doi:10.1017/CCOL9780521869652.017. ISBN 978-0-521-68976-2.
- Womack, Kenneth (2014). The Beatles Encyclopedia: Everything Fab Four. Santa Barbara, CA: Greenwood. ISBN 978-0-313-39172-9.
