= Meninas Cantoras de Petrópolis =

Brazilian musical group

- Origin: Petrópolis, Brazil
- Years active: 15 August 1976; 48 years ago-2 March 2016; 9 years ago

Meninas Cantoras de Petrópolis was a Brazilian musical group composed exclusively of girls, founded on 15 August 1976, in the city of Petrópolis, by maestro Marco Aurélio Xavier. They performed with many Brazilian musical artists, including Roberto Carlos, Gilberto Gil, Ivan Lins, Simone, Chitãozinho & Xororó, Sandy & Junior, Fafá de Belém, Fábio Júnior, Xuxa, Angélica Ksyvickis, Wanderléa, The Fevers, Luiz Ayrão, Wanderley Cardoso, Elizete Cardoso, Hebe Camargo, Selma Reis and Agnaldo Rayol.

In 1993, Producer George Martin collaborated with the group to perform songs of The Beatles at a concert in Rio de Janeiro. Before a crowd of more than 100,000 people, the concert took place at the Quinta da Boa Vista.

The choir was dissolved on 2 March 2016.
