= Paperback Writer =

1966 song by the Beatles

- US picture sleeve

Single by the Beatles
- B-side: "Rain"
- Released: 30 May 1966
- Recorded: 13–14 April 1966
- Studio: EMI, London
- Genre: Hard rock; power pop; psychedelic rock
- Length: 2:16 (stereo); 2:23 (mono)
- Label: Capitol (US); Parlophone (UK)
- Songwriter: Lennon–McCartney
- Producer: George Martin

The Beatles UK singles chronology
"We Can Work It Out" / "Day Tripper" (1965)	"Paperback Writer" (1966)	"Yellow Submarine" / "Eleanor Rigby" (1966)

The Beatles US singles chronology
"Nowhere Man" (1966)	"Paperback Writer" (1966)	"Yellow Submarine" / "Eleanor Rigby" (1966)

Promotional film
- "Paperback Writer" on YouTube

"Paperback Writer" is a song by the English rock band the Beatles. Written primarily by Paul McCartney and credited to the Lennon–McCartney partnership, the song was released as the A-side of their eleventh single in May 1966. It topped singles charts in the United Kingdom, the United States, Ireland, West Germany, Australia, New Zealand and Norway. On the US Billboard Hot 100, the song was at number one for two non-consecutive weeks, interrupted by Frank Sinatra's "Strangers in the Night".

"Paperback Writer" was the last new song by the Beatles to be featured on their final tour in 1966, and debuted globally on the 1966 compilation album A Collection of Beatles Oldies (except in the United States and Canada, where it first appeared on the 1970 collection Hey Jude).

== Background and inspiration ==
"Paperback Writer" was largely written by Paul McCartney, who based the lyrics on a challenge made to him by his aunt. McCartney said in 1966: "Years ago, my Auntie Lil said to me, 'Why do you always write songs about love all the time? Can't you ever write about a horse or the summit conference or something interesting?' So, I thought, 'All right, Auntie Lil.'" The inspiration for the song came backstage at a concert venue when McCartney, mindful of his aunt's request, saw Ringo Starr reading a book and declared his intention to write a song about a book.

The lyrics are in the form of a letter from an aspiring author addressed to a publisher. (Note: According to the Beatles' friend and aide Tony Bramwell, McCartney based much of the lyric on a letter he had received from a would-be novelist.) McCartney completed the song with John Lennon in response to pressure from EMI for a new Beatles single in April 1966, early on in the sessions for the band's Revolver album. Intrigued by the rhythmic possibilities of the phrase "paperback writer", McCartney came up with the framework for the song during his hour-long drive from London to Lennon's house in Weybridge, Surrey.

Discussing "Paperback Writer" with Alan Smith of the NME that year, McCartney recalled that he and Lennon wrote the lyrics in the form of a letter beginning with "Dear Sir or Madam", but that the song was not inspired by "any real-life characters". However, according to a 2007 piece in The New Yorker, McCartney said he started writing the song in 1965 after reading in the Daily Mail about an aspiring author, "possibly Martin Amis" (who would have been a teenager at the time). The Daily Mail was Lennon's regular newspaper, and copies were in Lennon's home when he and McCartney were writing songs.

Aside from deviating from the subject of love, McCartney also sought to write a song with a melody backed by a single, static chord. "John and I would like to do songs with just one note like 'Long Tall Sally'. We got near it in 'The Word'." McCartney claimed to have barely failed to achieve this goal with "Paperback Writer", as the verse remains on G major until the end, at which point it pauses on C major.

Lennon told Hit Parader in 1972 that "Paperback Writer" was primarily written by McCartney: "I think I might have helped with some of the lyrics. Yes, I did. But it was mainly Paul's tune." Speaking in 1980, Lennon described "Paperback Writer" as "son of 'Day Tripper' – meaning a rock'n'roll song with a guitar lick on a fuzzy, loud guitar – but it is Paul's song".

== Recording ==
The Beatles recorded "Paperback Writer" at EMI Studios in London on 13 and 14 April 1966. The 14 April session was attended by a photographer from Beatles Monthly. EMI engineer Phil McDonald's handwritten notes documented the band's experimentation with overdubs on the basic track. In the search for a suitable arrangement, George Harrison briefly switched to bass guitar, and producer George Martin contributed on tack piano (sent through a Leslie speaker) and Vox Continental organ; none of these were retained in the completed track.

"Paperback Writer" is marked by a much more prominent bass guitar sound than the band's previous work, partly in response to Lennon demanding to know why the bass on a certain Wilson Pickett record exceeded that on any Beatles records. Geoff Emerick, who had been promoted to the role of the Beatles' recording engineer for Revolver, later said: "'Paperback Writer' was the first time the bass sound had been heard in all its excitement. Paul played a different bass, a Rickenbacker. Then we boosted it further by using a loudspeaker as a microphone. We positioned it directly in front of the bass speaker and the moving diaphragm of the second speaker made the electric current." McCartney's playing was also more melodic and busy than on previous tracks.

According to McCartney, the harmony vocals on the track were arranged during the recording session. Martin later commented: "The way the song itself is shaped and the slow, contrapuntal statements from the backing voices – no one had really done that before." In their backing vocals over the third verse, Lennon and Harrison sing the title of the French nursery rhyme "Frère Jacques".

Emerick stated that the "Paperback Writer" / "Rain" single was cut louder than any other Beatles record up to that time due to a new piece of equipment used in the mastering process (referred to as "Automatic Transient Overload Control"), a compressor devised by the EMI maintenance department.

== Promotion ==
In Britain, the single was promoted with a photograph depicting the Beatles draped with pieces of raw meat and decapitated baby dolls. This photograph was later used, albeit briefly, as the cover of the US Beatles album Yesterday and Today, and in that capacity it became known as the "butcher cover". For the American release of the single, the picture sleeve showed the Beatles playing live, but with Lennon and Harrison's images reflected so that it appeared they were playing left-handed.

Michael Lindsay-Hogg directed four promotional films for the song shot on 19 and 20 May 1966. On the first day they recorded a colour performance at EMI Studios, for The Ed Sullivan Show, which was shown on 5 June, and two black-and-white performance clips for British television. The latter aired on Ready Steady Go! and Thank Your Lucky Stars on 3 and 25 June, respectively. The Beatles also filmed a personal introduction to Ed Sullivan with their faces hidden behind colour transparencies of the butcher cover. (Note: Starr then explained their absence, saying that they were too "busy ... with the washing and the cooking" to appear on the show in person.)

The promotional film recorded on 20 May 1966 is one of the earliest colour music videos.

On 20 May, a second colour film was made at Chiswick House in west London. Earlier that day, a video clip for "Rain" was also recorded (both clips are considered to be among the first colour music videos). The Beatles mimed to the song, and they were shown in a statue garden and inside the conservatory in the grounds of the house. (Note: Harrison described the Chiswick House promos for "Paperback Writer" and "Rain" as "the forerunner of [music] videos", adding: "I suppose in a way we invented MTV.") The clip was first broadcast in black and white on BBC-TV's Top of the Pops on 2 June. The 20 May promo clip was included in the Beatles' 2015 video compilation 1, and both the 19 May colour film and the 20 May film were included in the three-disc versions of the compilation, titled 1+.

The Beatles appeared on Top of the Pops to mime to "Paperback Writer" and "Rain" on 16 June. This television appearance – which was the Beatles' only "in person" appearance on the BBC's flagship pop music show of the era – was subsequently lost due to the BBC's habit of wiping expensive video tape for reuse, leading to efforts by the corporation to find an original copy. In 2019, a collector unearthed 11 seconds of the performance; a longer 92 seconds' worth was found later in the year.

== Release and reception ==
"Paperback Writer" was issued as a single in the US by Capitol Records on 30 May 1966, with the catalogue number 5651 and "Rain" as the B-side. The UK release, on EMI's Parlophone label, took place on 10 June, with the catalogue number R 5452. It was the Beatles' first UK single since the "Day Tripper" / "We Can Work It Out" double A-side in December 1965. Other than their brief performance at the annual NME Pollwinners Concert on 1 May, promotion for the new record was also the first sign of public activity by the band since the start of the year.

Reviewing the single for the NME, Derek Johnson said that "Paperback Writer" "swings along at a thundering pace", with McCartney's lead vocal "aided by some startling chanting". He admired Starr's "cymbal bashing" and concluded that "those sudden breaks in tempo help to increase the impact." In Disc and Music Echo, Penny Valentine said the song had a "marvellous dance beat" and was "very striking" due to its "break-up drumming and ethereal surf chorus". Record World's reviewer wrote that with a new Beatles single, "the rush is on", and commented on the band's use of "interesting electronic effects to good effect", while Cash Box predicted that the group would easily continue their run of "blockbuster" singles and described the A-side as "a rhythmic, pulsating ode with an infectious repeating riff all about the creative urge". A later review in 2016 by Rolling Stone said the song paved the way for the band's innovations on Revolver, opining that "from the get-go, there is something otherworldly" about it.

The more widely held view was one of disappointment, according to author Peter Doggett, and dismissal as "a brash, insubstantial throwaway". Writing in The Beatles: An Illustrated Record, NME critics Roy Carr and Tony Tyler described "Paperback Writer" as "the first Beatles single to receive less-than-universal acclaim", saying that it was "perhaps a trifle too 'clever'", and criticism was focused on "the triviality of the lyric and a slight nagging suspicion that the Beatles were playing at 'being songwriters' at a time when the world was waiting for The Word". The band's apparent aloofness also alienated many of their fans, who wrote into Record Mirror to disparage the group's new music. (Note: Patrick Doncaster, the Daily Mirror's show business reporter, commented that neither side of the single "had any romance about them. Gone, gone, gone are the days of luv, luv, luv." He quoted McCartney as saying: "It's not our best single by any means, but we're very satisfied with it. We are experimenting all the time with our songs ... Our new LP is going to shock a lot of people.") The UK music press were similarly offended by the ads for the single, which included a second "butcher" photo appearing in full colour on the cover of Disc and Music Echo, accompanied by the caption "Beatles: What a Carve-Up!" In author Nicholas Schaffner's description, this image led "one crusty columnist to rail against the importation of American 'sick humor' into the United Kingdom".

Such was the Beatles' status, they were scrutinised in the press when, like "Day Tripper" / "We Can Work It Out", the single failed to top all of the UK's sales charts straightaway. On the Record Retailer chart (subsequently adopted as the UK Singles Chart), "Paperback Writer" entered at number 2, behind Frank Sinatra's "Strangers in the Night", before taking the top position the following week. On the national chart compiled by Melody Maker, the song debuted at number 1, remaining there for a total of four weeks. Amidst a slowing domestic economy, despite the country's strong exports through music, the record's UK sales were the lowest for any Beatles single since their 1962 debut "Love Me Do".

In the US, "Paperback Writer" topped the Billboard Hot 100 for two non-consecutive weeks. It replaced the Rolling Stones' "Paint It Black" and was then deposed by Sinatra's single for a week before returning to number 1. It was certified as a gold record by the Recording Industry Association of America on 14 July. The single also topped the charts in Australia, West Germany and many other countries around the world.

The song's release coincided with London being feted by the US media as the "Swinging City" of international culture. In his book on the 1960s, social historian Arthur Marwick says the Beatles represented the popular image of a phenomenon in which "hitherto invisible swathes of British society became visible and assertive" and "Paperback Writer" was the song that best conveyed "the new class-defying tide of individualistic enterprise".

"Paperback Writer" was the only new song the Beatles included in their 1966 tour setlist. Their inability to reproduce the layered vocal effect of the studio recording was a source of embarrassment for the group, however. (Note: Harrison recalled that they took to waving at the audience – which he likened to the band's "Elvis legs" moment – eliciting screams that covered the poor performance.)

In addition to the band's characters and sound being moulded on the Beatles, songwriters Boyce and Hart used "Paperback Writer" as the basis for the Monkees' 1966 debut single "Last Train to Clarksville".

== Subsequent releases and other versions ==
A stereo mix of "Paperback Writer" was first made in late October 1966 for inclusion on the UK compilation album A Collection of Beatles Oldies and then appeared in an alternate stereo mix on the 1970 US compilation album Hey Jude. Following the Beatles' break-up, the song was included on compilations such as 1962–1966 (1973), Past Masters, Volume Two (1988) and 1 (2000). In 1995, a mix featuring only vocals was among several tracks that were in the running for inclusion on the three Beatles Anthology compilation albums but were ultimately passed over.

"Paperback Writer" was included on the Beatles' 2012 iTunes compilation Tomorrow Never Knows, which the band's website described as a collection of "the Beatles' most influential rock songs".

Other artists who have recorded the track include the Bee Gees, the Charles River Valley Boys, the Cowsills, Floyd Cramer, Eric Johnson, Kris Kristofferson, Kenny Rogers, the Shadows, Sweet, Daydé, Tempest and 10cc. McCartney has often played the song in concert. Live versions appear on his 1993 album Paul Is Live and 2009 album Good Evening New York City.

== Personnel ==
There is some dispute over who played what on "Paperback Writer". In the July 1990 and the November 2005 issues of Guitar Player magazine, McCartney stated that he played the song's opening riff on his Epiphone Casino guitar, and photos from the recording session seem to be consistent with this. In the 2005 edition of his book Revolution in the Head, Ian MacDonald gives Harrison as the sole lead guitarist, and Kenneth Womack similarly lists McCartney only on bass guitar and lead vocal. Robert Rodriguez and Walter Everett each credit McCartney as the player of the song's main guitar riff, and state that Harrison added lead guitar "fills" over his initial rhythm part.

The following line-up is per Rodriguez:

- Paul McCartney – lead vocal, lead guitar (riff), bass guitar
- John Lennon – backing vocal, tambourine
- George Harrison – backing vocal, rhythm guitar, lead guitar (fills)
- Ringo Starr – drums

== Charts and certifications ==
=== Weekly charts ===
Chart (1966)	Peak position
Australia (Kent Music Report)	1
Austria (Ö3 Austria Top 40)	4
Belgium (Ultratop 50 Flanders)	7
Canada Top Singles (RPM)	1
Denmark (Salgshitlisterne Top 20)	15
Ireland (IRMA)	1
Italy (Musica e Dischi)	6
Netherlands (Single Top 100)	1
New Zealand (Listener)	1
Finland (Suomen virallinen lista)	4
Norway (VG-lista)	1
South Africa (Springbok)	9
Sweden (Kvällstoppen)	1
Sweden (Tio i Topp)	4
UK Singles (Official Charts)	1
US Billboard Hot 100	1
US Cash Box Top 100	1
West Germany (Media Control)	1

=== Year-end charts ===
Chart (1966)	Rank
US Billboard Hot 100	28
US Cash Box Top 100	43

=== Certifications ===
Region	Certification	Certified units/sales
United States (RIAA)	Gold	1,000,000^{^}
^{^} Shipments figures based on certification alone.

== Sources ==
- Aldridge, Alan, ed. (1990). The Beatles Illustrated Lyrics. Boston, MA: Houghton Mifflin/Seymour Lawrence. ISBN 0-395-59426-X.
- Babiuk, Andy (2002). Beatles Gear: All the Fab Four's Instruments, from Stage to Studio. San Francisco, CA: Backbeat Books. ISBN 978-0-87930-731-8.
- Badman, Keith (2001). The Beatles Diary Volume 2: After the Break-Up 1970–2001. London: Omnibus Press. ISBN 978-0-7119-8307-6.
- The Beatles (2000). The Beatles Anthology. San Francisco, CA: Chronicle Books. ISBN 0-8118-2684-8.
- Borack, John M. (2007). Shake Some Action: The Ultimate Power Pop Guide. Fort Collins, CO: Not Lame Recording Company. ISBN 978-0-9797714-0-8.
- Carr, Roy; Tyler, Tony (1978). The Beatles: An Illustrated Record. London: Trewin Copplestone Publishing. ISBN 0-450-04170-0.
- Castleman, Harry; Podrazik, Walter J. (1976). All Together Now: The First Complete Beatles Discography 1961–1975. New York, NY: Ballantine Books. ISBN 0-345-25680-8.
- DeRogatis, Jim (2003). Turn on Your Mind: Four Decades of Great Psychedelic Rock. Milwaukee, WI: Hal Leonard. ISBN 978-0-634-05548-5.
- Emerick, Geoff (2006). Here, There and Everywhere: My Life Recording the Music of The Beatles. New York, NY: Gotham. ISBN 978-1-59240-269-4.
- Everett, Walter (1999). The Beatles as Musicians: Revolver Through the Anthology. New York, NY: Oxford University Press. ISBN 978-0-19-512941-0.
- Hertsgaard, Mark (1996). A Day in the Life: The Music and Artistry of the Beatles. London: Pan Books. ISBN 0-330-33891-9.
- Lewisohn, Mark (2005) [1988]. The Complete Beatles Recording Sessions: The Official Story of the Abbey Road Years 1962–1970. London: Bounty Books. ISBN 978-0-7537-2545-0.
- MacDonald, Ian (2005). Revolution in the Head: The Beatles' Records and the Sixties (2nd rev. ed.). London: Pimlico. ISBN 1-84413-828-3.
- Marwick, Arthur (2012) [1998]. The Sixties: Cultural Revolution in Britain, France, Italy, and the United States. London: Bloomsbury Reader. ISBN 978-1-4482-0573-8.
- Miles, Barry (2001). The Beatles Diary Volume 1: The Beatles Years. London: Omnibus Press. ISBN 0-7119-8308-9.
- Mojo Special Limited Edition: 1000 Days That Shook the World (The Psychedelic Beatles – April 1, 1965 to December 26, 1967). London: Emap. 2002.
- Miller, Scott (2010). Music: What Happened?. Boston, MA: 125 Books. ISBN 978-0-615-38196-1.
- Philo, Simon (2015). British Invasion: The Crosscurrents of Musical Influence. Lanham, MD: Rowman & Littlefield. ISBN 978-0-8108-8626-1.
- Rodriguez, Robert (2012). Revolver: How the Beatles Reimagined Rock 'n' Roll. Milwaukee, WI: Backbeat Books. ISBN 978-1-61713-009-0.
- Savage, Jon (2015). 1966: The Year the Decade Exploded. London: Faber & Faber. ISBN 978-0-571-27763-6.
- Schaffner, Nicholas (1978). The Beatles Forever. New York, NY: McGraw-Hill. ISBN 0-07-055087-5.
- Turner, Steve (2005). A Hard Day's Write: The Stories Behind Every Beatles Song (3rd ed.). New York: Harper Paperbacks. ISBN 0-06-084409-4.
- Turner, Steve (2016). Beatles '66: The Revolutionary Year. New York, NY: Ecco. ISBN 978-0-06-247558-9.
- Winn, John C. (2009). That Magic Feeling: The Beatles' Recorded Legacy, Volume Two, 1966–1970. New York, NY: Three Rivers Press. ISBN 978-0-307-45239-9.
- Womack, Kenneth (2014). The Beatles Encyclopedia: Everything Fab Four. Santa Barbara, CA: ABC-CLIO. ISBN 978-0-313-39171-2.
- Zolten, Jerry (2009). "The Beatles as Recording Artists". In Womack, Kenneth (ed.). The Cambridge Companion to the Beatles. Cambridge, UK: Cambridge University Press. pp. 33–61. ISBN 978-0-521-68976-2.
