= I Will =

1968 song by the Beatles

- Cover of the Maclen Music sheet music (depicting George Harrison and Paul McCartney)

Song by the Beatles

from the album The Beatles
- Released: 22 November 1968
- Recorded: 16–17 September 1968
- Studio: EMI, London
- Genre: Folk pop
- Length: 1:46
- Label: Apple
- Songwriter: Lennon–McCartney
- Producer: George Martin

"I Will" is a song by the English rock band the Beatles, from their 1968 double album The Beatles (also known as "the White Album"). It was written by Paul McCartney (credited to Lennon–McCartney) and features him on lead vocal, guitar, and "vocal bass".

== Background ==
"I Will" was one of the songs composed by the Beatles and their associates while in Rishikesh, India. Although the music came together fairly easily, the words were worked on in India, and remained unfinished even as recording began back in London. McCartney recalled that while in Rishikesh he and Donovan had written a set of lyrics with a "moon" theme, but he found them inadequate and so replaced them with "very simple words, straight love-song words". Donovan could not recall writing any of the early lyrics for the song but said that he possibly assisted McCartney with the "shape of the chords", in keeping with the "descending movements" in his own melodies.

McCartney also commented on "I Will": "It's still one of my favourite melodies that I've written. You just occasionally get lucky with a melody and it becomes rather complete and I think this is one of them; quite a complete tune."

== Recording ==
Recording for "I Will" took place at EMI Studios in London on 16 September 1968, with McCartney completing overdubs the following day. The basic track required 67 takes. George Harrison was not present at the session.

During take 19, McCartney ad-libbed an untitled song. Referred to as "Can you take me back?", a 28-second segment of this ended up on side four of The Beatles, at the end of "Cry Baby Cry", as what author Ian MacDonald described as "a sinister introduction to 'Revolution 9'".

In take 29, McCartney, as an ad-lib, sang "won't" in place of "will" during the first verse before John Lennon replies, "Yes you will." McCartney chuckles after this ad-lib and then the song ends at this point. This take was included in the expanded box set of The Beatles released in 2018.

== Release and reception ==
Apple Records released The Beatles on 22 November 1968, with "I Will" sequenced as the penultimate track on side two, between "Why Don't We Do It in the Road?" and "Julia". During an interview for Radio Luxembourg to promote the release, McCartney emphasised the wide range of musical styles found on the double album. He said that "I Will" was a legacy of the Beatles having had to satisfy requests for styles such as rhumba during their pre-fame years in Hamburg.

Author Jonathan Gould identifies "I Will" as an effective "demure punchline" to the sexual suggestiveness of "Why Don't We Do It in the Road?", and similar in mood and form to McCartney's 1966 song "Here, There and Everywhere". He also views it as lacking in genuine emotion, however, due to the lyrics and musical arrangement, and concludes: "This is one of the few instances in which the restraint Paul typically brought to his ballad singing blanches into something that sounds like simple indifference. 'Who knows how long I've loved you?' he asks, and it's tempting to think, 'Who cares?'" Howard Sounes welcomes the diversification of McCartney's non-rock White Album contributions such as "Martha My Dear" and "Honey Pie" but he says of "I Will": "[It] exemplified Paul's weakness for the soft-centred love song. The melody was catchy, but the lyric, about loving his beloved forever and ever, etc., was the sickliest cliché, a taste of what was to come."

Coinciding with the 50th anniversary of its release, Jacob Stolworthy of The Independent listed "I Will" at number 12 in his ranking of the White Album's 30 tracks. He called the song "crystalline proof that no one can write a love song as effortlessly as McCartney", adding that McCartney's selection of it among his personal favourites is a tough choice to argue with. The song was sung in the 1994 film Love Affair, starring Annette Bening and Warren Beatty.

== Personnel ==
According to Ian MacDonald:

- Paul McCartney – lead and backing vocals, acoustic guitars, "vocal bass"
- John Lennon – percussion, maracas
- Ringo Starr – bongos, cymbals

== Sources ==
- Gould, Jonathan (2007). Can't Buy Me Love: The Beatles, Britain and America. London: Piatkus. ISBN 978-0-7499-2988-6.
- Lewis, Michael (10 October 2009). 100 Best Beatles Songs: A Passionate Fan's Guide. Running Press. ISBN 978-1603762656.
- Lewisohn, Mark (1988). The Beatles Recording Sessions. New York: Harmony Books. ISBN 0-517-57066-1.
- MacDonald, Ian (2005). Revolution in the Head: The Beatles' Records and the Sixties (2nd revised ed.). London: Pimlico. ISBN 1-84413-828-3.
- Margotin, Philippe; Guesdon, Jean-Michel (2013). All the Songs: The Story Behind Every Beatles Release. New York, NY: Black Dog & Leventhal. ISBN 978-1-57912-952-1.
- Miles, Barry (1997). Paul McCartney: Many Years from Now. New York, NY: Henry Holt & Company. ISBN 0-8050-5249-6.
- Sounes, Howard (2010). Fab: An Intimate Life of Paul McCartney. London: HarperCollins. ISBN 978-0-00-723705-0.
- Winn, John C. (2009). That Magic Feeling: The Beatles' Recorded Legacy, Volume Two, 1966–1970. New York, NY: Three Rivers Press. ISBN 978-0-307-45239-9.
