= Here Today (Paul McCartney song) =

Song by Paul McCartney

from the album Tug of War
- Released: 26 April 1982
- Recorded: 1981
- Studio: High Park, Campbeltown, Scotland; AIR, London
- Genre: Soft rock
- Length: 2:27
- Label: Parlophone (UK); Columbia Records (US)
- Songwriter: Paul McCartney
- Producer: George Martin

"Here Today" is a song by Paul McCartney from his 1982 album Tug of War. He wrote the song as a tribute to his relationship with John Lennon, who was murdered in 1980. He stated the song was composed in the form of an imaginary conversation the pair might have had. The song was produced by the Beatles' producer George Martin. Although not released as a single, the song reached No. 46 on the Billboard Mainstream Rock charts.

== Origins and meaning ==
Paul McCartney composed "Here Today" in mid-1981, less than a year after Lennon's murder. In a 1982 interview with The Los Angeles Times, McCartney said that due to the honest and emotional nature of the song he was "kind of crying" when he wrote it. He even found it difficult to talk about with the other remaining members of the Beatles. The structure of the song itself is written like a dialogue between Lennon and McCartney. McCartney says that Lennon used to "lay into" McCartney, but often did not really mean it, and this is emulated in the hypothetical conversation in which the two bicker over whether or not they really know each other. The song is about McCartney really trying to talk to Lennon, but finding it futile after the latter's death.

McCartney describes parts of the song as being quite honest. One verse in the song refers to an incident that occurred during the Beatles' first full American tour in 1964 when they were stranded in Key West, Florida during a hurricane. Said McCartney,

It was during that night, when we'd all stayed up way too late, and we got so pissed that we ended up crying—about, you know, how wonderful we were, and how much we loved each other, even though we'd never said anything. It was a good one: you never say anything like that. Especially if you're a Northern Man.

McCartney recorded "Here Today" sometime after June 1981 at his High Park home studio in Campbeltown, Scotland. The Beatles' former producer George Martin produced the song and provided its orchestral accompaniment, performed by a string quartet at AIR Studios in London on 30 November 1981. Mixing was done at Odyssey Studios in London on 9 December 1981.

== Live performances ==
McCartney often performs the song live, and it is featured on the live albums Back in the World, Back in the U.S., Amoeba Gig and Good Evening New York City.

While performing the song, McCartney is prone to becoming choked up over the emotional content of the song. He told The Guardian,

At least once a tour, that song just gets me. I'm singing it, and I think I'm OK, and I suddenly realise it's very emotional, and John was a great mate and a very important man in my life, and I miss him, y'know?

== Personnel ==
- Paul McCartney – lead vocals, acoustic guitar
- Jack Rothstein – violin
- Bernard Partridge – violin
- Ian Jewel – viola
- Keith Harvey – cello

== Chart performance ==
Chart (1982)	Peak position
US Mainstream Rock (Billboard)	46

== See also ==
- "All Those Years Ago", George Harrison's 1981 tribute song to Lennon (with McCartney on backing vocals)
