= The Word (song) =

1965 song by the Beatles

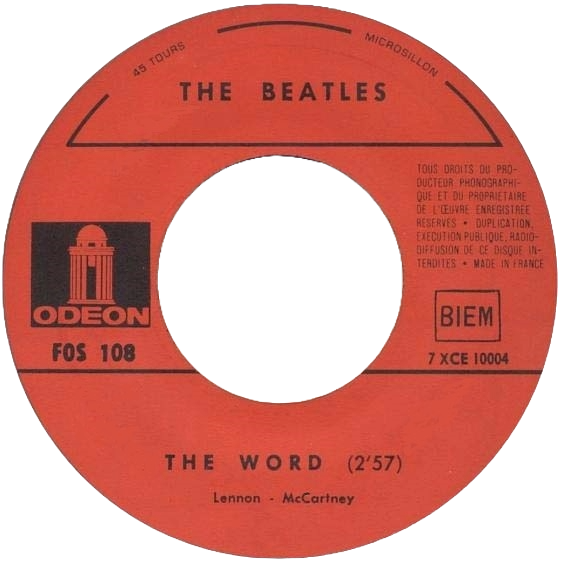
- B-side label from the 1966 French single, with "Nowhere Man" as the A-side

Song by the Beatles

from the album Rubber Soul
- Released: 3 December 1965
- Recorded: 10 November 1965
- Studio: EMI, London
- Genre: Rock, R&B
- Length: 2:41
- Label: Parlophone
- Songwriter: Lennon–McCartney
- Producer: George Martin

"The Word" is a song by the English rock band the Beatles, written by John Lennon and Paul McCartney and recorded with Lennon on lead vocals. It was first released on their 1965 album Rubber Soul.

== Background and inspiration ==
John Lennon had felt during his youth that "love had been the answer", and had written "The Word" as his "first expression" of the concept. He had felt that love was an "underlying theme of the universe", and that love was fundamental in many things, which had inspired the lyric "In the good and bad books that I have read". The song is credited to Lennon–McCartney; however, Lennon had stated that it was "mainly mine". It had marked the first time the Beatles had written a song about love as a concept, which would become important in the band's later work.

== Composition ==
Musically, the song is founded on a driving funk beat, with few chord changes and a simple melody in the key of D major. (The refrain is a 12-bar blues in D. The main chord is D7(♯9), also used in "Drive My Car" and "Taxman".)

Paul McCartney said of this song, "John and I would like to do songs with just one note like 'Long Tall Sally'. We get near it in 'The Word'".

== Reception ==
In his review for the 50th anniversary of Rubber Soul, Jacob Albano of Classic Rock Review writes that "The Word" is the first song on its parent album not to be "absolutely excellent," calling the harmonies "a bit too forced." However, Albano still considered the song "entertaining", and complimented the "piano backdrop" and Starr's drum performance. Far Out's Jack Whatley and Tyler Golsen had both considered the song to be an important song for the Beatles and had been considered to be a part of their transition from creating pop songs to psychedelic-influenced songs.

In 2018, the music staff of Time Out London ranked "The Word" at number 33 on their list of the best Beatles songs.

== Personnel ==
According to Walter Everett, except where noted:

The Beatles

- John Lennon – lead vocal, (Note: On the US stereo release of Rubber Soul, Lennon's lead vocal is double-tracked during the song's bridge.) rhythm guitar
- Paul McCartney – falsetto and double-tracked backing vocals, bass guitar, piano
- George Harrison – double-tracked backing vocal, lead guitar
- Ringo Starr – drums, maracas

Additional musician

- George Martin – harmonium
