= The End (Beatles song) =

- Cover of the song's sheet music

Song by the Beatles

from the album Abbey Road
- Released: 26 September 1969
- Recorded: 23 July – 20 August 1969
- Studio: EMI, London
- Genre: Hard rock
- Length: 2:05
- Label: Apple
- Songwriter: Lennon–McCartney
- Producer: George Martin

Abbey Road medley chronology
"Carry That Weight"	"The End"

"The End" is a song by the English rock band the Beatles from their 1969 album Abbey Road. It was composed by Paul McCartney and credited to Lennon–McCartney. It was the last song recorded collectively by all four Beatles, and is the final song of the medley that constitutes the majority of side two of the album. The song features the only drum solo recorded by Ringo Starr with the Beatles.

== Composition and recording ==
McCartney said, "I wanted [the medley] to end with a little meaningful couplet, so I followed the Bard and wrote a couplet." In his 1980 interview with Playboy, John Lennon acknowledged McCartney's authorship by saying, "That's Paul again ... He had a line in it, 'And in the end, the love you get is equal to the love you give,' which is a very cosmic, philosophical line. Which again proves that if he wants to, he can think." Lennon misquoted the line; the actual words are, "And in the end, the love you take, is equal to the love you make..."

Recording began on 23 July 1969, when the Beatles recorded a one-minute, thirty-second master take that was extended via overdubs to two minutes and five seconds. At this point, the song was called "Ending". The first vocals for the song were added on 5 August, additional vocals and guitar overdubs were added on 7 August, and bass and drums on 8 August, the day the Abbey Road cover picture was taken. Orchestral overdubs were added on 15 August, and the closing piano and accompanying vocal on 18 August.

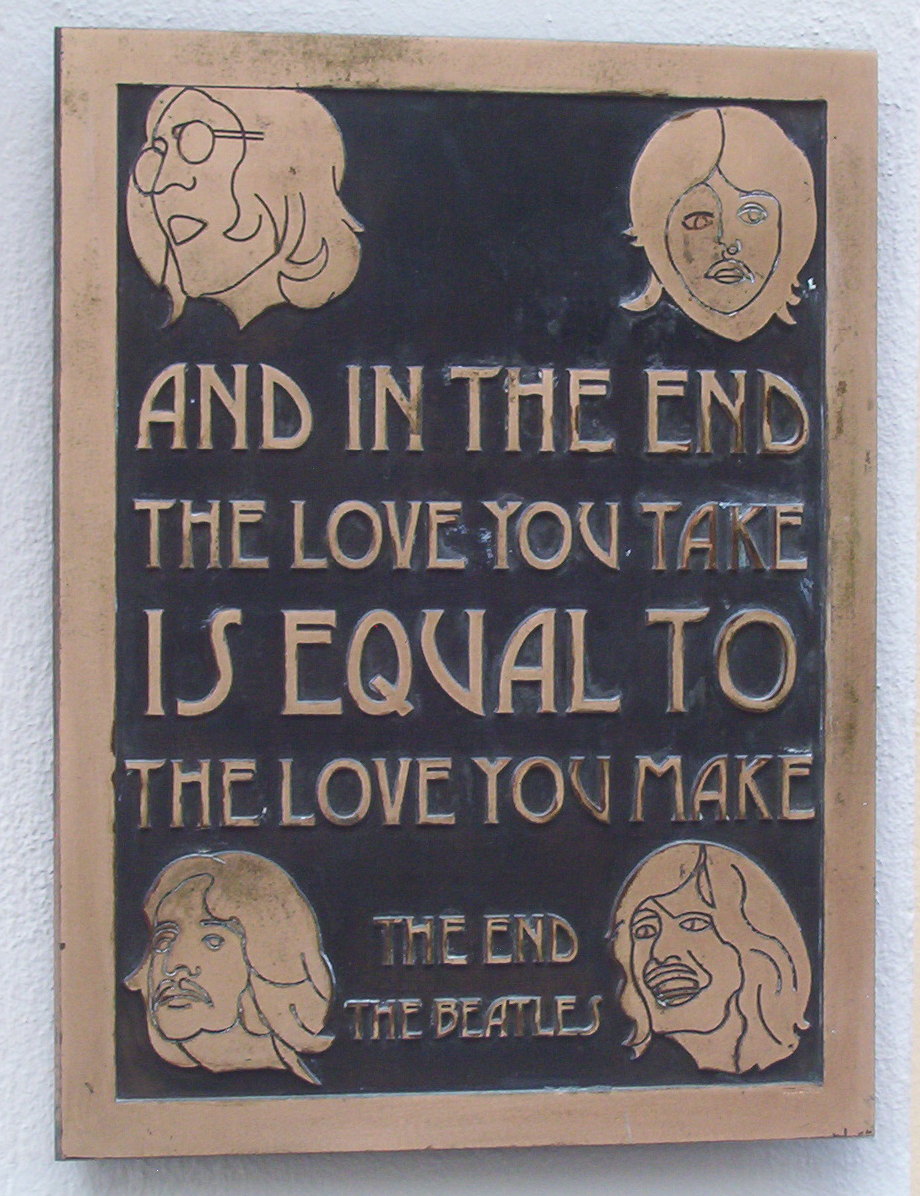
The closing lyrics of "The End" inspired this plaque.

All four Beatles have a solo in "The End", including a Ringo Starr drum solo. Starr, as with the rest of the band, disliked drum solos, preferring to cater drum work to whoever sang in a particular performance, and in fact this is the only drum solo Starr recorded with the Beatles. McCartney recalls that Starr had to be persuaded somewhat to do the solo, making an exception for the medley. His solo on "The End" was recorded with twelve microphones around his drum kit; in his playing, he said he copied part of Ron Bushy's drumming on the Iron Butterfly track "In-A-Gadda-Da-Vida". The take in which Starr performed the solo originally had guitar and tambourine accompaniment, but other instruments were muted during mixing, giving the effect of a drum solo.

McCartney, George Harrison and Lennon perform a rotating sequence of three, two-bar guitar solos. The idea for a guitar instrumental over this section was Harrison's, and Lennon suggested that the three of them each play a section. The solos begin approximately 53 seconds into the song. Geoff Emerick, the Beatles' recording engineer, later recalled: "John, Paul and George looked like they had gone back in time, like they were kids again, playing together for the sheer enjoyment of it. More than anything, they reminded me of gunslingers, with their guitars strapped on, looks of steely-eyed resolve, determined to outdo one another. Yet there was no animosity, no tension at all – you could tell they were simply having fun."

The first two bars are played by McCartney, the second two by Harrison, the third two by Lennon, and then the sequence repeats twice. Each has a distinctive style which McCartney felt reflected their personalities. McCartney's was more melodic, Harrison made heavy use of string bends, and Lennon used heavy distortion. Immediately after Lennon's third solo, the piano chords of the final line "And in the end ..." begin. The orchestration arrangement then takes over with a humming chorus and Harrison playing a final guitar solo that ends the song.

"The End" was initially intended to be the final track on Abbey Road, but it ended up being followed by "Her Majesty". "The End" stands as the last known new recording involving all four members of the Beatles during the band's existence. One additional song, "I Me Mine", was recorded by three members of the group (Lennon being absent due to having privately left the band in September 1969) in January 1970 for the album Let It Be.

The 1996 compilation album Anthology 3 contains a remixed version of "The End", restoring tambourine and guitar overdubs mixed out of the original, and edited to emphasise the guitar solos and orchestral overdub. The track is followed by a variant on the long piano chord that ends "A Day in the Life" (reversed, then played forwards), concluding the compilation and also ending The Beatles Anthology.

== Musical structure ==
The song commences in A major with a tempo of 123 beats per minute, with an initial I–IV–II–V–I structure matching the vocals on "Oh, yeah, all right!" This is followed by a ♯iv dim–I pattern (D♯dim to A chord) on "dreams tonight." During this, the accompanying bass and one guitar move chromatically from A to B and D♯, while the second guitar harmonises a minor third higher to reach F♯. An eight-bar drum solo as a final statement of recognition to their "steady, solid drummer" ends with a crescendo of eighth notes and bass and rhythm guitar in seventh chords to the chant "Love you." The sequential three guitar solos rotate through I^{7} (A^{7} chord)–IV^{7} (D^{7} chord) changes in the key of A in a mix of "major and minor pentatonic scales with slides, double-stops, repeated notes, low-bass string runs and wailing bends". Gould terms these live studio takes "little character sketches":

Paul opens with a characteristically fluid and melodically balanced line that sounds a high A before snaking an octave down the scale; George responds by soaring to an even higher D and sustaining it for half a bar before descending in syncopated pairs of 16th notes; John then picks upon the pattern of George's 16ths with a series of choppy thirds that hammer relentlessly on the second and flattened seventh degrees of the scale. The second time through, Paul answers John's bluesy flattened 7ths with bluesy minor thirds and then proceeds to echo George's earlier line, spiraling up to that same high D; George responds with some minor thirds of his own, while mimicking the choppy rhythm of John's part; John then drops two octaves to unleash a growling single-note line. On this final two-bar solo, Paul plays almost nothing but minor thirds and flattened sevenths in a herky-jerky rhythm that ends with a sudden plunge to a low A; George then reaches for the stars with a steeply ascending line that is pitched an octave above any notes heard so far; and John finishes with a string of insistent and heavily distorted 4ths, phrased in triplets, that drag behind the beat and grate against the background harmony.

The final "Ah" is in C with a spiritually evocative Plagal cadence IV–I (F–C chord) on piano while the voices do an F to E shift. "And in the end the love you take" is in A major, but the G/A chord supporting the word "love" begins to dissolve the listener's certainty that the chord is in A, by adding a ♭VII. The next line shifts us to the fresh key of C, with a iv (F) chord that threatens the dominance of the departing A key's F♯: "Is eq-ual" (supported successively by IV (F)–iii (Em) chords with an A–G bass line) "to the love" (supported successively by ii (Dm)–vi (Am)–ii^{7} (Dm^{7}) chords with a F–E bass line) "you make" (supported by a V^{7} (G^{7}) chord). The final bars in the key of C involve a I–II–♭III rock-type progression and a IV–I soothing cadence that appear to instinctively reconcile different musical genres.

== Critical reception ==
Richie Unterberger of AllMusic considered "The End" to be "the group's take on the improvised jamming common to heavy rock of the late '60s, though as usual, The Beatles did it with far more economic precision than anyone else." John Mendelsohn of Rolling Stone said it was "a perfect epitaph for our visit to the world of Beatle daydreams: 'The love you take is equal to the love you make.'"

In 2007, "The End" was ranked at number 7 on Q magazine's list "The 20 Greatest Guitar Tracks".

== Legacy ==
- An alternative version of the song, with Harrison's lead guitar solo played against McCartney's (and Starr's drum solo heard in the background), appears on the Anthology 3 album and the 2012 digital-only compilation album Tomorrow Never Knows.
- McCartney's second guitar solo, Lennon's last guitar solo and Starr's drum solo were used in the intro to "Get Back" in Love, the remix album that served as the soundtrack for the Beatles-themed Cirque du Soleil show of the same name.
- Chris Farley famously asked McCartney on the Chris Farley Show skit on Saturday Night Live, whether it was true that "the love you take is equal to the love you make." McCartney replied, to Farley's delight, that, in his experiences, it was, saying "the more you give, the more you get."
- McCartney performed the closing couplet of "The End" at the 2012 Summer Olympics opening ceremony just prior to closing the event with a performance of the song "Hey Jude".
- The song was used as the final song played on the classic rock stations KMET and KSWD in Los Angeles as well as WNEW-FM and WPLJ in New York City.
- British broadcaster and BBC DJ Ken Bruce chose the song as the final track played on his last BBC Radio 2 show on 3 March 2023.
- Phil Collins covered the song on George Martin's 1998 album In My Life.
- Comedy rock duo Tenacious D released a mashup of "You Never Give Me Your Money" and "The End" on 1 July 2021. The proceeds benefited Doctors Without Borders.

== Personnel ==
Personnel per Ian MacDonald and Kenneth Womack:

- Paul McCartney – lead and backing vocals, bass guitar, piano, guitar solo (Epiphone Casino)
- John Lennon – harmony vocals, rhythm guitar, guitar solo (Epiphone Casino)
- George Harrison – harmony vocals, rhythm and lead guitar, guitar solo (Gibson Les Paul)
- Ringo Starr – backing vocals, drums, tambourine
- George Martin – orchestration
- Uncredited – 12 violins, four violas, one double-bass, four horns, three trumpets, one trombone, one bass trombone
