= Golden Slumbers =

- Cover of the song's sheet music

Song by the Beatles

from the album Abbey Road
- Released: 26 September 1969
- Recorded: 2–4, 30–31 July and 15 August 1969
- Studio: EMI, London
- Genre: Soft rock
- Length: 1:31
- Label: Apple Records
- Songwriter: Lennon–McCartney
- Producer: George Martin

Abbey Road medley chronology
"She Came In Through the Bathroom Window"	"Golden Slumbers"	"Carry That Weight"

Audio sample
- "Golden Slumbers": file; help

"Golden Slumbers" is a song by the English rock band the Beatles from their 1969 album Abbey Road. Written by Paul McCartney and credited to Lennon–McCartney, it is the sixth song of the album's climactic B-side medley. The song is followed by "Carry That Weight" and begins the progression that leads to the end of the album. The two songs were recorded together as a single piece, and both contain strings and brass arranged and scored by producer George Martin.

== Background ==
"Golden Slumbers" is based on the poem "Cradle Song", a lullaby by the dramatist Thomas Dekker, first published in 1603, in the play Patient Grissel. In the 1885 collection St Nicholas Songs (p. 177) was set to music by W. J. Henderson's music, under the title "Golden Slumbers Kiss Your Eyes". Dekker's poem was also set to music by Peter Warlock and by Charles Villiers Stanford & Alfredo Casella, before McCartney's adaptation.

McCartney saw sheet music for "Cradle Song" at his father's home in Liverpool, left on a piano by his stepsister Ruth. Unable to read music, he created his own music. McCartney uses the first stanza of the original poem, with minor word changes, adding to it a single lyric line repeated with minor variation. Abbey Road does not credit Dekker with the stanza or with the title.

"Cradle Song"
Golden slumbers kiss your eyes,
Smiles awake you when you rise.
Sleep, pretty wantons; do not cry,
And I will sing a lullaby:
Rock them, rock them, lullaby.

Care is heavy, therefore sleep you;
You are care, and care must keep you;
Sleep, pretty wantons; do not cry,
And I will sing a lullaby:
Rock them, rock them, lullaby

== Recording ==
McCartney was the lead vocalist. He begins the song in a soft tone appropriate for a lullaby, with piano, bass guitar, and string section accompaniment. The drums come in on the line "Golden slumbers fill your eyes", and McCartney switches to a stronger tone, both of which emphasise the switch to the refrain. McCartney said, "I remember trying to get a very strong vocal on it, because it was such a gentle theme, so I worked on the strength of the vocal on it, and ended up quite pleased with it."

The main recording session for "Golden Slumbers"/"Carry That Weight" was on 2 July 1969. John Lennon was not present, as he had been injured in a motor vehicle accident in Scotland on 1 July, and was hospitalised there until 6 July.

Drums, timpani, and additional vocals were added in an overdub session on 31 July, the same day the first trial edit of the side two medley was created, with Lennon participating in the session. On 15 August, 30-piece orchestral overdubs were added to "Golden Slumbers" and five other songs on Abbey Road.

== Personnel ==
According to Ian MacDonald:

The Beatles

- Paul McCartney – lead vocals, piano
- George Harrison – 6-string bass guitar
- Ringo Starr – drums, timpani

== Certifications ==
Region	Certification	Certified units/sales
United Kingdom (BPI)	Silver	200,000^{‡}
^{‡} Sales+streaming figures based on certification alone.

== Notable cover versions ==
- Scottish band Trash recorded "Golden Slumbers/Carry That Weight" which was released as a single on Apple Records a week prior to the Abbey Road release. The song reached number 35 in the UK singles charts.
- The song was included in the 1978 movie and its accompanying soundtrack, Sgt. Pepper's Lonely Hearts Club Band, sung by Peter Frampton and the Bee Gees.
- Elbow recorded a cover of the song for the 2017 John Lewis Christmas TV advert. The single reached No. 29 in the UK.
