= Carry That Weight =

1969 song by the Beatles

- Cover of the song's sheet music

Song by the Beatles

from the album Abbey Road
- Released: 26 September 1969
- Recorded: 2–4, 30–31 July and 15 August 1969
- Studio: EMI, London
- Genre: Rock
- Length: 1:36
- Label: Apple
- Songwriter: Lennon–McCartney
- Producer: George Martin

Abbey Road medley chronology
"Golden Slumbers"	"Carry That Weight"	"The End"

"Carry That Weight" is a song by the English rock band the Beatles from their 1969 album Abbey Road. Written by Paul McCartney and credited to Lennon–McCartney, it is the seventh and penultimate song in the album's climactic side-two medley. It features unison vocals in the chorus from all four Beatles, a rarity in their songs. It is preceded by "Golden Slumbers" and segues into "The End".

The middle bridge—featuring brass instruments, electric guitar, and vocals—reprises the beginning of "You Never Give Me Your Money", but with different lyrics. The ending also reprises the arpeggiated guitar motif from the end of that track.

== Interpretation ==
Music critic Ian MacDonald interpreted the lyrics as an acknowledgement by the group that nothing they would do as individual artists would equal to what they had achieved together, and they would always carry the weight of their Beatle past. McCartney said the song was about the Beatles' business difficulties and the atmosphere at Apple at the time. In the film Imagine: John Lennon, Lennon says that McCartney was "singing about all of us".

== Recording ==
McCartney introduced the Beatles to "Carry That Weight" in the Twickenham Studios sessions. On January 6, 1969, McCartney proposed his unfinished composition as a light-hearted song for Ringo to sing, patterned after the song "Act Naturally," which Ringo sang on Help! in the UK and Yesterday and Today in the USA.

The Beatles began recording "Golden Slumbers"/"Carry That Weight" as one piece on 2 July 1969. McCartney, Harrison, and Ringo Starr recorded 15 takes of the two songs while Lennon was in a hospital recovering from a car accident in Scotland.

The rhythm tracks featured McCartney on piano, Harrison on bass guitar, and Starr on drums. The best takes were deemed to be takes 13 and 15, which were edited together on 3 July. That day and the next, McCartney overdubbed his lead vocals and rhythm guitar, Harrison added lead guitar, and all three sang the chorus.

On 30 July, they added more vocals, including Lennon, who had rejoined the sessions on 9 July. More vocals, timpani, and drums were overdubbed on 31 July. The orchestra that marked 30 musicians altogether was recorded on 15 August.

== Personnel ==
According to Ian MacDonald and Mark Lewisohn (who is unsure whether Starr or McCartney played timpani):

The Beatles

- Paul McCartney – lead vocal, piano, rhythm guitar, chorus vocal
- John Lennon – chorus vocal
- George Harrison – 6-string bass guitar, lead guitar, chorus vocal
- Ringo Starr – drums, chorus vocal, timpani

Additional musicians

- Uncredited – twelve violins, four violas, four cellos, double bass, four horns, three trumpets, trombone, bass trombone
- George Martin – orchestral arrangement
