= The Japan Box =

Box set by the Beatles
- Released: 25 June 2014
- Recorded: 1962–1965
- Studios: EMI, London; Pathé Marconi, Paris
- Genres: Rock; pop
- Length: 165:00
- Labels: Apple; UM^{e}
- Producer: George Martin

The Beatles chronology
The U.S. Albums (2014)	The Japan Box (2014)	1+ (2015)

The Japan Box is a boxed set compilation of the five albums released by the Beatles for the Japanese market between 1964 and 1965, originally released in Japan by Odeon Records. The albums consist of Meet the Beatles!, The Beatles' Second Album, A Hard Day's Night, The Beatles No. 5, and Help! The box set presents them in the Mini LP format. It also includes a 100-page book.

AllMusic noted about the compilation, "the reason to pick this up is the packaging, and this is as nicely assembled as The U.S. Albums or The Beatles in Mono".

== Disc and track listing ==
With the exception of A Hard Day's Night and Help!, which are in stereo, all albums are in mono.

=== Meet the Beatles! ===
1. "I Want to Hold Your Hand" – 2:24
2. "She Loves You" – 2:19
3. "From Me to You" – 1:56
4. "Twist and Shout" – 2:30
5. "Love Me Do" – 2:19
6. "Baby It's You" – 2:40
7. "Don't Bother Me" – 2:28
8. "Please Please Me" – 2:00
9. "I Saw Her Standing There" – 2:50
10. "P.S. I Love You" – 2:06
11. "Little Child" – 1:46
12. "All My Loving" – 2:04
13. "Hold Me Tight" – 2:30
14. "Please Mister Postman" – 2:34

=== The Beatles' Second Album ===
1. "Can't Buy Me Love" – 2:15
2. "Do You Want to Know a Secret" – 1:59
3. "Thank You Girl" – 2:01
4. "A Taste of Honey" – 2:05
5. "It Won't Be Long" – 2:11
6. "I Wanna Be Your Man" – 1:59
7. "There's a Place" – 1:53
8. "Roll Over Beethoven" – 2:48
9. "Misery" – 1:48
10. "Boys" – 2:28
11. "Devil in Her Heart" – 2:29
12. "Not a Second Time" – 2:03
13. "Money (That's What I Want)" – 2:52
14. "Till There Was You" – 2:13

=== A Hard Day's Night ===
1. "A Hard Day's Night" – 2:28
2. "I Should Have Known Better" – 2:42
3. "If I Fell" – 2:22
4. "I'm Happy Just to Dance with You" – 1:59
5. "And I Love Her" – 2:30
6. "Tell Me Why" – 2:04
7. "Can't Buy Me Love" – 2:15
8. "Any Time at All" – 2:13
9. "I'll Cry Instead" – 1:48
10. "Things We Said Today" – 2:39
11. "When I Get Home" – 2:18
12. "You Can't Do That" – 2:35
13. "I'll Be Back" – 2:21

=== The Beatles No. 5 ===
1. "Long Tall Sally" – 2:03
2. "Sie Liebt Dich" – 2:19
3. "Anna" – 3:00
4. "Matchbox" – 1:57
5. "You Really Got a Hold on Me" – 3:03
6. "She's a Woman" – 3:03
7. "Ask Me Why" – 2:28
8. "I Feel Fine" – 2:25
9. "Komm, Gib Mir Deine Hand" – 2:24
10. "Chains" – 2:27
11. "Slow Down" – 2:58
12. "All I've Got to Do" – 2:04
13. "I Call Your Name" – 2:09
14. "This Boy" – 2:11

=== Help! ===
1. "Help!" – 2:18
2. "The Night Before" – 2:37
3. "You've Got to Hide Your Love Away" – 2:11
4. "I Need You" – 2:30
5. "Another Girl" – 2:08
6. "You're Going to Lose That Girl" – 2:20
7. "Ticket to Ride" – 3:10
8. "Act Naturally" – 2:33
9. "It's Only Love" – 1:53
10. "You Like Me Too Much" – 2:39
11. "Tell Me What You See" – 2:40
12. "I've Just Seen a Face" – 2:05
13. "Yesterday" – 2:03
14. "Dizzy Miss Lizzy" – 2:54

== See also ==
- Outline of the Beatles
- The Beatles timeline
