= I Need You (Beatles song) =

- Cover of the Northern Songs sheet music

Song by the Beatles

from the album Help!
- Released: 6 August 1965
- Recorded: 15–16 February 1965
- Studio: EMI, London
- Genre: Pop rock; folk rock
- Length: 2:28
- Label: Parlophone
- Songwriter: George Harrison
- Producer: George Martin

"I Need You" is a song by the English rock band the Beatles from their 1965 album Help! It was written by George Harrison, the group's lead guitarist, and was the second composition of his to be released by the Beatles. The track appears in their film Help!, in a scene filmed on Salisbury Plain where the group were under military protection from a murderous cult.

Harrison wrote "I Need You" about Pattie Boyd, the English model whom he married in January 1966. Recorded in February 1965 at the start of the sessions for Help!, it features the Beatles' first use of a guitar volume pedal. Tom Petty and the Heartbreakers played the song in tribute to Harrison at the Concert for George in November 2002.

== Background and inspiration ==
George Harrison presented "I Need You", along with "You Like Me Too Much", for consideration for the Beatles' second feature film, Help!, in early 1965. Before this, he had struggled to complete a song since the band recorded his first composition, "Don't Bother Me", for their 1963 album With the Beatles. In a September 1964 press conference, Harrison said he had written three "bits" of songs, but nothing "whole". George Martin, the band's producer, attributed his lack of productivity to the fact that "none of us had liked something he had written", and Harrison had felt disheartened. (Note: Music critic Richie Unterberger says that Martin was possibly referring to "You Know What to Do". The Beatles taped a demo of the song in June 1964, after completing the recording for their album A Hard Day's Night.) He subsequently resolved to ensure that his occasional vocal spots on the group's albums were his own compositions rather than Lennon–McCartney songs or cover versions. According to biographer Gary Tillery, Harrison's creativity was most likely inspired by his habitual marijuana use, a legacy of the Beatles' first meeting with Bob Dylan in August 1964.

Harrison wrote "I Need You" about his girlfriend Pattie Boyd, whom he met in March 1964 while the Beatles were filming A Hard Day's Night. Their relationship provided Harrison with a sense of calm amid the frenzy of Beatlemania; for Boyd, however, the jealousy of the band's fans was confronting. The song's lyrics address a time when she left Harrison. (Note: Some writers have claimed that he wrote it in the Bahamas while separated from Boyd (during the filming of Help!), but the Bahamas scenes in the film were shot a week after the song was recorded.) Shortly before recording the songs, Harrison routined "I Need You" and "You Like Me Too Much" with John Lennon at the latter's house in Weybridge. The pair worked together into the early hours of the day of Ringo Starr's wedding to Maureen Cox, which took place on 11 February 1965.

== Composition ==
As recorded by the Beatles, the song is in the key of A major. Its distinctive lead guitar cadences were achieved by using a volume pedal and through common guitar suspended chords in the key of A. These form the introduction and most of the verse of the song and give a quasi-modal effect relieved in the verse by a line in the relative minor, the whole making a fourteen-bar ternary verse-structure. This, after a repeat, segues easily into a second bridge melody, which is based on a simple IV-V-I chord progression that passes through the dominant key to resolve back on the verse.

The song has characteristics typical of Harrison's writing style in its syncopated melody line and melodic idiosyncrasy. According to author Ian Inglis, "its rhythmic and tonal structures clearly identify this as a Harrison song, but it is also, indisputably, a Beatles song." Musicologist Dominic Pedler recognises an interesting feature in the use of an imperfect cadence (resolving on A major) in the climax of the bridge (on "I just can't go on anymore") which uses II (B7) and V (E7) chords. The verse-chorus also employs what Pedler terms a "delaying tactic" in alternating between vi and iii chords (over the lines "Please come on back to me / I'm lonely as can be") before again returning to A.

The lyrics serve as a rare example of Harrison embracing the standard boy–girl themes of love songs. According to musicologist Alan Pollack, they show Harrison "at his absolutely most vulnerable" and convey a "bitter-sweetly mixed tone of plaintive, terminal desperation". Harrison states his confusion at his girlfriend's decision to leave him, expresses his sadness without her, and begs her to reconsider. In Inglis's view, the singer's candour, combined with the upbeat tempo and other qualities in the Beatles' arrangement, ensures "it is not a hopeless situation", and the listener can be sure that the girl will return.

== Recording ==
The Beatles recorded "I Need You" at EMI Studios (now Abbey Road Studios) in London on 15 and 16 February 1965. These were the group's first recording sessions of the year and also produced "Ticket to Ride" and "Another Girl". All three tracks were included in Help!, filming for which began in the Bahamas on 23 February. (Note: In a radio interview in April, however, Harrison stated that he was unsure whether either of his two songs would appear in the film.)

The song marked the Beatles' first use of a guitar volume pedal. This tone-altering effect was a precursor to the wah-wah pedal and had recently been played by session guitarist Big Jim Sullivan on Dave Berry's UK chart hits "The Crying Game" and "One Heart Between Two". (Note: In a November 1964 interview for Melody Maker, Harrison praised Sullivan as a guitarist, saying: "Jim Sullivan – he's a knockout. I wish he'd show me how he does it. I've never met him and I'd like to one day.") Harrison's adoption of the pedal typified his search for new sounds for the Beatles, and for colouring that was empathetic with the group's material. He played the part on his Rickenbacker 12-string electric guitar and soon used the effect again on "Yes It Is", a similarly emotive Lennon composition. Musicologist Walter Everett recognises the volume pedal's presence on "I Need You" as the most important example within the band's work, with every chord given the "flautando-like" sound, and "multiple articulations" appearing throughout the song's coda. Citing a comment later made by Harrison, Everett says that "I Need You" was possibly one of the tracks where the pedal control was operated by Lennon, kneeling down on the studio floor, while Harrison played the guitar part.

In the 2006 book Recording the Beatles, the authors highlight the song as an example of the "warm, full sound" that EMI's Telefunken M10 four-track recorder was able to capture. Journalist Kit O'Toole recognises the song's lead guitar effect and other folk rock qualities as having been influential on the Byrds, whose sound in turn would influence the Beatles.

== Film sequence ==
Harrison performing the song in Help!

The film sequence for "I Need You" was shot over 3–5 May and consists of the band miming to the track on Salisbury Plain in Wiltshire. Since the start of filming for Help!, events had taken place that distanced the Beatles, particularly Harrison and Lennon, from the public image they were expected to uphold in the feature film, and were exerting a profound influence on the band's thinking. Among these incidents, Harrison was introduced to Indian philosophy in the Bahamas when a local swami gave each of the Beatles a copy of The Complete Illustrated Book of Yoga; he and Lennon, together with Boyd and Lennon's wife Cynthia, had their first experience with the hallucinogenic drug LSD, in late March; and Harrison encountered an Indian sitar for the first time while filming a restaurant scene in London in April. In Tillery's description, 1965 was the most "pivotal" year in Harrison's life, as LSD opened the door to his enduring quest for spiritual enlightenment and Eastern philosophy provided a means to escape the demands of Beatlemania.

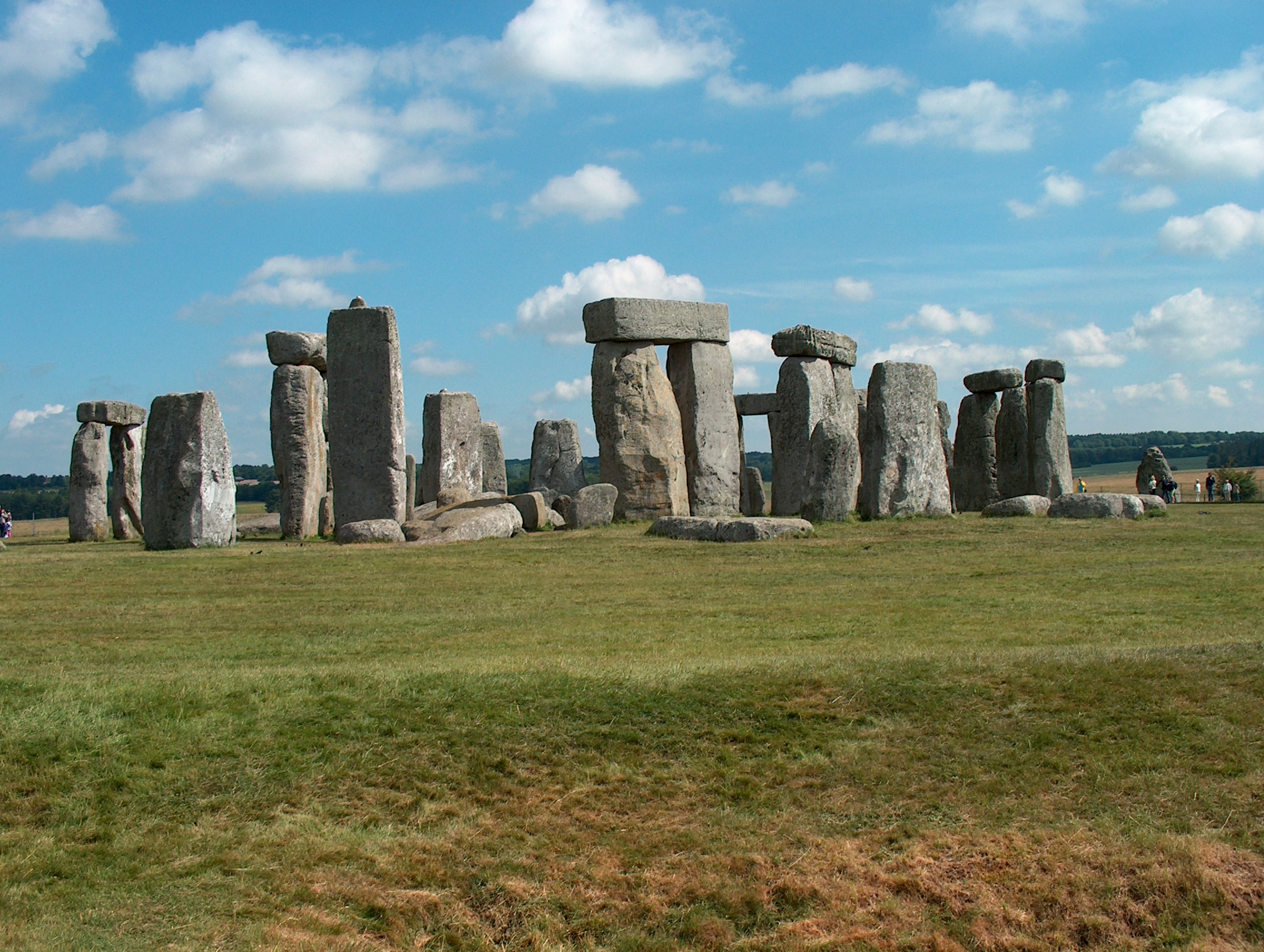
The Help! sequence was filmed near Stonehenge.

The "I Need You" sequence depicts an outdoor recording session, with a makeshift control booth and microphones set up in an open field. Further to the film's premise that Starr was being targeted for assassination by a mysterious cult, the Beatles perform under the protection of the British 3rd Royal Tank Regiment, surrounded by soldiers and Centurion tanks. (Note: The band also filmed the sequence for McCartney's "The Night Before" at this time.) Although it was spring, the weather was unusually cold, and the sequence shows Starr shivering behind his drum kit.

The premise and the level of security afforded the band mirrored the adulation they received in real life, at the height of Beatlemania. Media theorist Stephanie Fremaux comments on the imagery employed by director Richard Lester in his harsh editing and shots of soldiers and weaponry to convey a sense of threat, and how this is furthered by the Beatles', and particularly Harrison's, apparent hostility and avoidance of eye contact with the camera. Film historian Stephen Glynn highlights a shot that features Harrison in profile, singing into a metallic microphone, and the corresponding gun barrel of a tank as an example of Lester making "visual parallels between the tools of the musician and the military". Another example, according to Glynn, is an aerial shot of the band encircled by six tanks that cuts to a close-up of the fretboard of Harrison's guitar, with the focus soon changing to reveal Stonehenge in the near distance. (Note: Glynn views this imagery as indicative of the Beatles' standing as "the new focus of a nation's worship", in place of the ancient stones of Stonehenge, while the "frightening underbelly of Beatlemania" is reflected in the murderous cult that pursues the band, replacing the adoring fans from A Hard Day's Night.)

== Release ==
Help! was released by EMI's Parlophone label on 6 August 1965, with "I Need You" sequenced as the fourth track between "You've Got to Hide Your Love Away" and "Another Girl". Martin said the song "worked out very well" and considered it an important step for Harrison. He added: "He has got something to say as a songwriter, and I hope he keeps it up." (Note: Harrison again employed syncopation in his Rubber Soul track "If I Needed Someone", although the lyrics were a marked departure from the innocence of "I Need You". It was also his first song to reflect the influence of Indian music.) Other than "I Need You", all the songs in the film were Lennon–McCartney compositions. As the end credits stated this on screen, a voiceover from Harrison repeatedly said, "'I Need You' by George Harrison!", increasing in volume each time.

The album and film enjoyed major commercial success around the world. In music journalist Jon Savage's description, the summer of 1965 "belonged" to the Beatles' Help! "multimedia campaign", which comprised the "Help!" hit single as well as the film and soundtrack album. In Willy Russell's 1974 play based on the Beatles' history, John, Paul, George, Ringo ... and Bert, "I Need You" was sung by Brian Epstein's character in response to the group's decision to retire from touring in 1966. The Beatles' recording of the track appeared on the 1977 compilation album Love Songs, issued by EMI to exploit the band's catalogue seven years after their break-up. (Note: At the first Beatles fan convention held in the UK, in December 1976, one of the highlights among the items of memorabilia was the suit worn by Harrison when filming "I Need You" on Salisbury Plain. The suit sold at auction for an unexpectedly high £200 (equivalent to £1,348 in 2025).)

== Critical reception ==
Among Beatles biographers, Jonathan Gould describes "I Need You" as a "modest, mild love song" that sounded "a lot like the efforts of other contemporary songwriters to write in the style of Lennon and McCartney". In Mark Hertsgaard's view, the track is "a catchy pop tune" that showed how Harrison "had now matured into the kind of pleasantly stylized, if innocuous, songwriter that Lennon and McCartney had been in their early days". According to Alan Clayson, "for all its simplistic libretto and suspensions à la 'One Heart Between Two'", the song was "more immediately attractive" than some of the Lennon–McCartney songs on Help!

Writing in the 2004 edition of The Rolling Stone Album Guide, Rob Sheffield described "I Need You" and "You Like Me Too Much" as "the finest George songs known to man". He viewed Help! as the band's "big step forward" in its exploration of themes such as "doubt, loneliness, alienation, adult sexual longing" and said that for Harrison's persona relative to Lennon and McCartney, "the Quiet One got Smart as well as Cute". By contrast, PopMatters editor John Bergstrom featured the song in his 2009 list titled "the worst of the Beatles". He said that "I Need You" justified statements subsequently made by Lennon, McCartney and Martin that until late in the Beatles' career, Harrison's songwriting presence was limited in accordance with his talent and experience, and he dismissed Harrison's vocal on the track as "flat and tentative, even as the lovelorn lyrics are sincere" and his use of the guitar volume pedal as rudimentary.

Reviewing the remastered Help! that same year, for Paste magazine, Mark Kemp said that "Harrison surfaces here as a formidable songwriter, taking center stage on 'I Need You' and 'You Like Me Too Much'." According to Stephen Thomas Erlewine of AllMusic, while the two Harrison compositions pale beside Lennon and McCartney's songs on the album, "they hold their own against much of their British pop peers."

== Cover versions ==
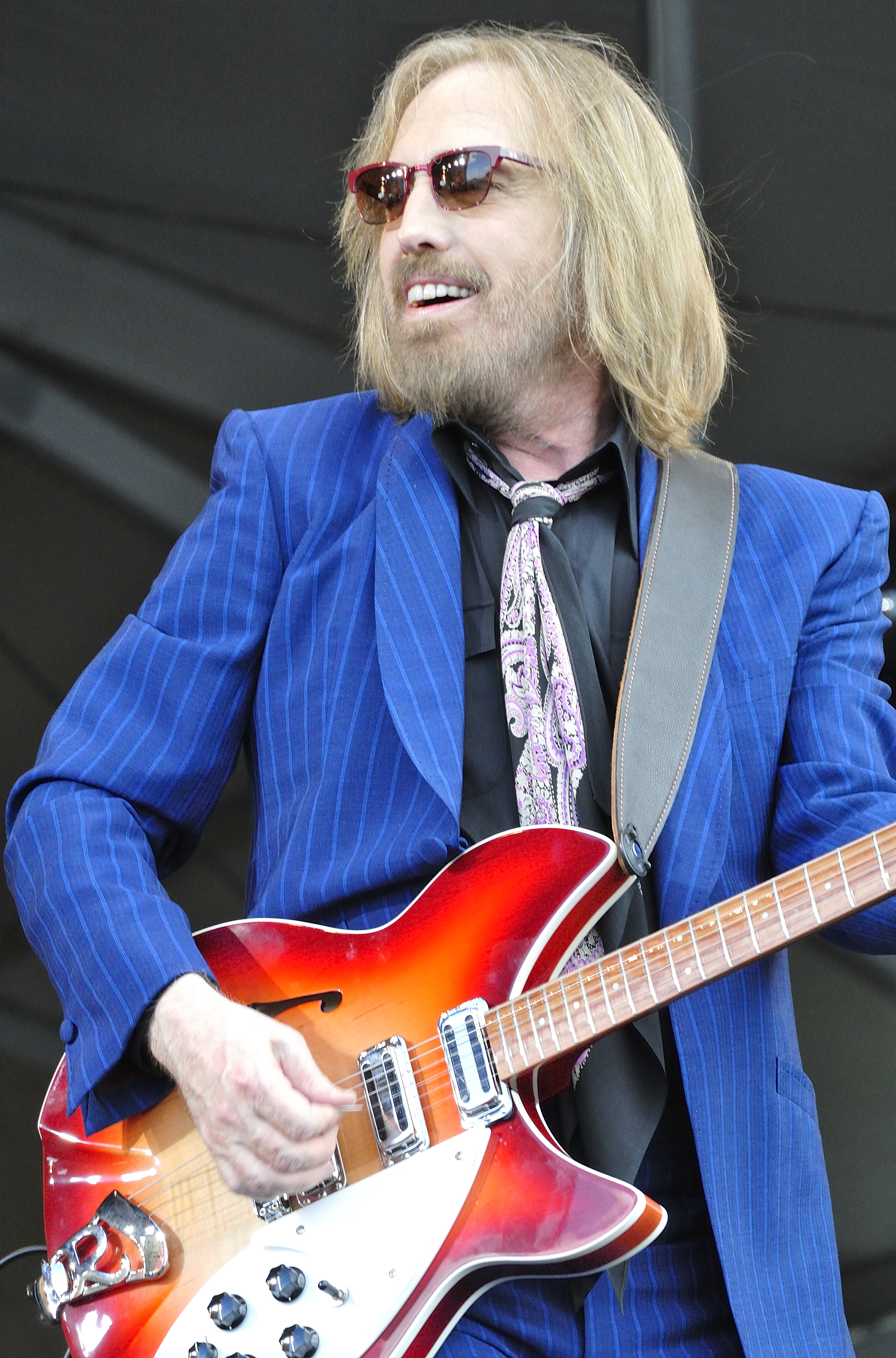
Tom Petty (pictured in 2012) performed "I Need You" at the Concert for George.

George Martin included "I Need You" on his 1965 album of instrumental versions of Beatles songs, also titled Help! The Sunshine Company recorded a version, arranged by George Tipton, for their 1967 Imperial Records LP Happy Is the Sunshine Company.

Tom Petty and the Heartbreakers performed "I Need You" in tribute to Harrison at the Concert for George in November 2002. Its inclusion provided a rare departure from the concert's program of the best-known songs from Harrison's career as a Beatle and a solo artist. Petty and his band played the song in a style that Ian Inglis recognises as typical of the Byrds, whose initial sound was inspired by the Beatles, particularly Harrison's use of 12-string Rickenbacker guitar. Inglis describes Petty's interpretation as "an uncannily accurate reconstruction" of the Byrds' mid-1960s style, with a "clipped vocal delivery" reminiscent of Roger McGuinn, harmony singing, "chiming" guitars, and a slower tempo than on the Beatles' recording.

Former Journey vocalist Steve Perry covered "I Need You" on his 2018 album Traces. Perry said that the Beatles had recorded a bossa nova-like version but had not done justice to the song, which deserved to be "a bigger sort of R&B pocket thing". He recalled that he sought approval from Olivia Harrison, Harrison's widow, before releasing his interpretation and was relieved when she told him, "George would have loved this version."

== Personnel ==
George Martin kept notes during the session that documented the unusual arrangement, which was:

- George Harrison – double-tracked lead vocal, classical guitar, twelve-string lead guitar
- John Lennon – harmony vocal, snare drum
- Paul McCartney – harmony vocal, bass guitar
- Ringo Starr – acoustic guitar percussion, cowbell

== Sources ==
- Badman, Keith (2001). The Beatles Diary Volume 2: After the Break-Up 1970–2001. London: Omnibus Press. ISBN 978-0-7119-8307-6.
- Brackett, Nathan; Hoard, Christian, eds. (2004). The New Rolling Stone Album Guide. New York, NY: Fireside/Simon & Schuster. ISBN 0-7432-0169-8.
- Bray, Christopher (2014). 1965: The Year Modern Britain Was Born. London: Simon & Schuster. ISBN 978-1-84983-387-5.
- Clayson, Alan (2003). George Harrison. London: Sanctuary. ISBN 1-86074-489-3.
- Everett, Walter (2001). The Beatles as Musicians: The Quarry Men through Rubber Soul. New York, NY: Oxford University Press. ISBN 0-19-514105-9.
- Fremaux, Stephanie (2018). The Beatles on Screen: From Pop Stars to Musicians. New York, NY: Bloomsbury Academic. ISBN 978-1-5013-2713-1.
- Glynn, Stephen (2013). The British Pop Music Film: The Beatles and Beyond. Basingstoke, UK: Palgrave Macmillan. ISBN 978-0-230-39222-9.
- Gould, Jonathan (2007). Can't Buy Me Love: The Beatles, Britain and America. London: Piatkus. ISBN 978-0-7499-2988-6.
- Hertsgaard, Mark (1996). A Day in the Life: The Music and Artistry of the Beatles. London: Pan Books. ISBN 0-330-33891-9.
- Inglis, Ian (2010). The Words and Music of George Harrison. Santa Barbara, CA: Praeger. ISBN 978-0-313-37532-3.
- Jackson, Andrew Grant (2015). 1965: The Most Revolutionary Year in Music. New York, NY: Thomas Dunne Books. ISBN 978-1-250-05962-8.
- Leng, Simon (2006). While My Guitar Gently Weeps: The Music of George Harrison. Milwaukee, WI: Hal Leonard. ISBN 978-1-4234-0609-9.
- Lewisohn, Mark (2005) [1988]. The Complete Beatles Recording Sessions: The Official Story of the Abbey Road Years 1962–1970. London: Bounty Books. ISBN 978-0-7537-2545-0.
- MacDonald, Ian (1998). Revolution in the Head: The Beatles' Records and the Sixties. London: Pimlico. ISBN 978-0-7126-6697-8.
- Miles, Barry (2001). The Beatles Diary Volume 1: The Beatles Years. London: Omnibus Press. ISBN 0-7119-8308-9.
- Pedler, Dominic (2003). The Songwriting Secrets of the Beatles. London: Omnibus Press. ISBN 978-0-7119-8167-6.
- Robertson, John (2002). "Help!: The End of the Beginning". Mojo Special Limited Edition: 1000 Days That Shook the World (The Psychedelic Beatles – April 1, 1965 to December 26, 1967). London: Emap. pp. 10–17.
- Rodriguez, Robert (2010). Fab Four FAQ 2.0: The Beatles' Solo Years, 1970–1980. Milwaukee, WI: Backbeat Books. ISBN 978-1-4165-9093-4.
- Ryan, Kevin; Kehew, Brian (2006). Recording the Beatles: The Studio Equipment and Techniques Used to Create Their Classic Albums. Houston, TX: Curvebender Publishing. ISBN 0-9785200-0-9.
- Savage, Jon (2015). 1966: The Year the Decade Exploded. London: Faber & Faber. ISBN 978-0-571-27763-6.
- Sheffield, Rob (2017). Dreaming the Beatles: The Love Story of One Band and the Whole World. New York, NY: HarperCollins. ISBN 978-0-06-220765-4.
- Tillery, Gary (2011). Working Class Mystic: A Spiritual Biography of George Harrison. Wheaton, IL: Quest Books. ISBN 978-0-8356-0900-5.
- Turner, Steve (1999). A Hard Day's Write: The Stories Behind Every Beatles Song. New York, NY: Carlton/HarperCollins. ISBN 0-06-273698-1.
- Unterberger, Richie (2006). The Unreleased Beatles: Music & Film. San Francisco, CA: Backbeat Books. ISBN 978-0-87930-892-6.
- Winn, John C. (2008). Way Beyond Compare: The Beatles' Recorded Legacy, Volume One, 1962–1965. New York, NY: Three Rivers Press. ISBN 978-0-307-45239-9.
- Womack, Kenneth (2017). Maximum Volume: The Life of Beatles Producer George Martin – The Early Years, 1926–1966. Chicago, IL: Chicago Review Press. ISBN 978-1-61373-189-5.
