= Help! (George Martin album) =

1965 studio album by the George Martin Orchestra

Studio album by the George Martin Orchestra
- Released: 6 September 1965 (US); 19 November 1965 (UK)
- Recorded: 1965
- Studio: EMI, London
- Genre: Easy listening
- Label: Columbia, United Artists
- Producer: George Martin

The George Martin Orchestra chronology
George Martin Scores Instrumental Versions of the Hits (1965)	Help! (1965)	George Martin Instrumentally Salutes "The Beatle Girls" (1966)

Professional ratings
Review scores
Source	Rating
AllMusic	2.5/5 stars

Help! is a 1965 album by the George Martin Orchestra, the second in a series of albums by Martin featuring instrumental arrangements of Beatles songs. United Artists released the LP in the United States on 19 September 1965, and EMI's Columbia Graphophone label released it in the United Kingdom on 19 November. The album consists of Martin's interpretations of songs from the Beatles' own Help! album, which was issued in August 1965.

== Track listing ==
The following list is for the Columbia version. The United Artists release lists "I've Just Seen a Face", "It's Only Love" and "Yesterday" under their working titles (*) and omits the track "Bahama Sound". (Note: This instrumental was released in 1967 in the US as the B-side of the single "Love in the Open Air".)

All songs written by Lennon–McCartney, except where noted.

Side one

1. "Help!" – 2:37
2. "Another Girl" – 2:08
3. "You're Going to Lose That Girl" – 2:16
4. "I Need You" (George Harrison) – 2:50
5. "You've Got to Hide Your Love Away" – 1:58
6. "The Night Before" – 2:29

Side two

1. "Ticket to Ride" – 3:00
2. "Bahama Sound" (George Martin) – 2:40
3. "I've Just Seen a Face (Auntie Gin's Theme*)" – 2:10
4. "It's Only Love (That's a Nice Hat*)" – 2:37
5. "Tell Me What You See" – 2:41
6. "Yesterday (Scrambled Egg*)" – 2:19
