= Another Girl =

1965 song by the Beatles

- Cover of the song's sheet music

Song by the Beatles

from the album Help!
- Released: 6 August 1965
- Recorded: 15–16 February 1965
- Studio: EMI, London
- Genre: Country rock; rockabilly
- Length: 2:04
- Label: Parlophone, Capitol, EMI
- Songwriter: Lennon–McCartney
- Producer: George Martin

"Another Girl" is a song by the English rock band the Beatles from their 1965 album Help! and included in the film of the same title. The song was written by Paul McCartney and credited to the Lennon–McCartney partnership. The song is addressed to the singer's girlfriend, who is informed that the singer has found "another girl."

== Background and recording ==
Although "Another Girl" is credited to the Lennon–McCartney songwriting partnership, it was written primarily by Paul McCartney. On 4 February 1965, following completion of the Beatles' Christmas shows, McCartney and then girlfriend Jane Asher flew to Hammamet, Tunisia, for a 10-day holiday. Because McCartney was there as a guest of the British government, he was able to relax, protected from the hassles of Beatlemania. The couple stayed at a villa that was built in the 1920s by Romanian George Sebastian. According to music journalist Steve Turner, the villa – known as "Sebastian's Villa" or "Villa Sebastian" – had previously been visited by such writers as Winston Churchill, Ernest Hemingway and F. Scott Fitzgerald. (Note: McCartney had initially been recommended the location by Peter Ustinov.) The property contained a small amphitheatre that had been built the previous year, and McCartney was inspired by its acoustics to begin writing a new song. He finished "Another Girl" in a bathroom in the villa, which biographer Barry Miles described as having "ideal" acoustics for songwriting.

The Beatles began recording the song on 15 February, the day after McCartney returned from Tunisia. It was the first day of recording for the soundtrack of the band's second feature film, Help! "Another Girl" was the second of three songs worked on that day, after "Ticket to Ride" and before "I Need You". Held in EMI's Studio Two, the session was produced by George Martin and engineered by Norman Smith, Ken Scott, and Jerry Boys. The band achieved a satisfactory basic track in one take, featuring McCartney on lead vocals and bass, Ringo Starr on drums, and John Lennon and George Harrison on backing vocals and acoustic and electric rhythm guitars. (Note: Sources disagree on who played which rhythm guitar part. Citing George Martin's notes in his book Playback: An Illustrated Memoir, Jean-Michael Guesdon and Philippe Margotin write that Harrison played the acoustic part and Lennon the electric; however, Ian MacDonald, Walter Everett, and Kenneth Womack state the opposite. Sources do agree that the acoustic guitar used was a Gibson J-160E and the electric guitar was a Fender Stratocaster Sonic Blue.)

The band then added overdubs. McCartney double-tracked his vocal and Lennon added more backing vocals. Harrison took 10 attempts at a guitar flourish to be edited onto the end of track, with the seventh being deemed best; however, this was left out of the final mix. Harrison struggled with the lead guitar for the rest of the song, so McCartney recorded his own the next day using his Epiphone Casino. The song was mixed for mono on 18 February by Martin, Smith, and Scott, and in stereo on 23 February by Smith and Malcolm Davies.

== Composition ==
With an up-tempo swing-beat that McCartney favoured ("Can't Buy Me Love", "She's a Woman") it opens with a short refrain, powered by block vocal harmonies, that segues straight into the verse, which is constructed on the blues-mode chord changes that the group favoured at that time. The bridge theme makes a sudden key change up a minor third from A to C (a harmonic strategy also used on the record's next track "You're Going to Lose That Girl") and features more close three-part harmonies as the aggressively sung verse's apparent threat to a jealous girl turns into a sweet tribute to the "other" girl who "will always be my friend".

This song features the often-utilized three-part harmonies between Lennon, McCartney and Harrison, but it is one of the only instances in which Lennon sings the highest harmony.

McCartney said of this song and other album tracks, "It's a bit much to call them fillers because I think they were a bit more than that, and each one of them made it past the Beatles test. We all had to like it."

== Live performances ==
The song was performed live for the first time by a Beatle when Paul McCartney returned to the Nippon Budokan, Tokyo, on 28 April 2015; this was 49 years after the Beatles had first played at the venue, in June and July 1966. In a released statement, McCartney said, "It was sensational and quite emotional remembering the first time and then experiencing this fantastic audience tonight."

== In the film Help! ==
In the film Help!, McCartney lip-syncs "Another Girl" while standing on a coral reef on Balmoral Island in the Bahamas, and plays a girl in a bikini as if she is a guitar. Since McCartney's hands are occupied (with either bass or girl), Harrison mimes McCartney's guitar fills. The four Beatles also each change instruments; Harrison is seen playing McCartney's bass, Starr is shown playing acoustic guitar, and Lennon mimes playing drums. Another scene was filmed at the Cloisters, a famous Bahamian landmark.

== Cover versions ==
The George Martin Orchestra covers the track on Help!, their instrumental reworking of the Beatles' album.

Berlin-based Lautten Compagney covers the track on their 2021 album "Time Travel" in an arrangement for baroque orchestra and saxophone.

== Personnel ==
According to George Martin, quoted by Kevin Ryan and Brian Kehew:

- Paul McCartney – double-tracked lead vocal, bass guitar, electric lead guitar
- John Lennon – harmony vocal, electric rhythm guitar
- George Harrison – harmony vocal, acoustic rhythm guitar
- Ringo Starr – drums

== Bibliography ==
- Courrier, Kevin (2009). Artificial Paradise: The Dark Side of the Beatles' Utopian Dream. Westport, CT: Praeger. ISBN 978-0-313-34586-9.
- Davies, Hunter (2014). The Beatles Lyrics: The Stories Behind the Music, Including the Handwritten Drafts of More Than 100 Classic Beatles Songs. New York, NY: Little, Brown and Company. ISBN 978-0-316-24716-0.
- Davies, Hunter (2016). The Beatles Book. London: Ebury Press. ISBN 978-0-09-195861-9.
- Everett, Walter (2001). The Beatles as Musicians: The Quarry Men through Rubber Soul. New York, NY: Oxford University Press. ISBN 978-0-19-514105-4.
- Guesdon, Jean-Michel; Margotin, Philippe (2013). All the Songs: The Story Behind Every Beatles Release. New York, NY: Black Dog & Leventhal Publishers. ISBN 978-1-57912-952-1.
- Jacobson, Laurie (2022). Top of the Mountain: The Beatles at Shea Stadium 1965. Lanham, MD: Backbeat Books. ISBN 978-1-4930-6529-5.
- Lewisohn, Mark (1988). The Complete Beatles Recording Sessions. New York, NY: Harmony Books. ISBN 978-0-600-63561-1.
- MacDonald, Ian (2007). Revolution in the Head: The Beatles' Records and the Sixties (Third ed.). Chicago Review Press. ISBN 978-1-55652-733-3.
- Miles, Barry (1997). Paul McCartney: Many Years From Now. New York, NY: Henry Holt. ISBN 978-0-8050-5248-0.
- Ryan, Kevin; Kehew, Brian (2006). Recording the Beatles: The Studio Equipment and Techniques Used to Create Their Classic Albums. Houston, TX: Curvebender Publishing. ISBN 0-9785200-0-9.
- Sheff, David (2000) [1981]. Golson, G. Barry (ed.). All We Are Saying: The Last Major Interview with John Lennon and Yoko Ono. New York, NY: St. Martin's Griffin. ISBN 978-0-312-25464-3.
- Turner, Steve (2015). The complete Beatles songs: The stories behind every track written by the Fab Four. London: Carlton Books. ISBN 978-1-78097-711-9.
- Womack, Kenneth (2014). The Beatles Encyclopedia: Everything Fab Four. Santa Barbara, CA: Greenwood. ISBN 978-0-313-39172-9.
