= It's Only Love =

- Sheet music cover

Song by the Beatles

from the album Help!
- Released: 6 August 1965 (UK: Help!); 6 December 1965 (US: Rubber Soul)
- Recorded: 15 June 1965
- Studio: EMI, London
- Genre: Folk rock
- Length: 1:55
- Label: Parlophone
- Songwriter: Lennon–McCartney
- Producer: George Martin

"It's Only Love" is a song by the English rock band the Beatles, written by John Lennon and credited to Lennon–McCartney. It was first released in 1965 on the Help! album in the United Kingdom and on the Rubber Soul album in the United States.

== Recording ==
The Beatles recorded "It's Only Love" at EMI Studios in London on 15 June 1965. Lennon's working title for the composition was "That's a Nice Hat". The band recorded six takes of the rhythm track, two of which were incomplete, with a line-up of 6- and 12-string acoustic guitars, bass and drums. The high register of the acoustic guitars was created through Lennon and George Harrison each using a capo on the neck of their instrument.

Lennon overdubbed his vocals onto the final take, and Harrison recorded lead guitar parts, including one with a heavy tremolo effect. According to musicologist Walter Everett's description of the recording, Harrison played all three of the electric guitar parts, including one that doubles the main riff on a Rickenbacker 12-string. Author Ian MacDonald cites the varied sound treatment applied to Lennon's vocals and Harrison's guitars as an example of the Beatles' increasingly experimental approach to production during the Help! period.

Take 2 of "It's Only Love" was included on the Anthology 2 compilation in 1996, with a false start (the incomplete take 3) edited onto the beginning of the track.

== Reception ==
Lennon was highly critical of "It's Only Love", describing it as a "lousy song" with "abysmal lyrics". In MacDonald's opinion, the song is a "twee make-weight" that, while "slightly redeemed by the vigorous chorus", features the "hollowest" lyrics of Lennon's career.

Journalist Mark Hertsgaard says that although the song falls short of the high standard of Lennon's Help! track "You've Got to Hide Your Love Away", his dismissal of "It's Only Love" was overly harsh and fails to do justice to its "lovely lilting melody". In his review of Help! for AllMusic, Stephen Thomas Erlewine considers "It's Only Love" to be one of the rare "minor numbers" on an album where Lennon dominates the songwriting with "great" contributions such as "Ticket to Ride", the title track and "You're Going To Lose That Girl".

== Personnel ==
According to Ian MacDonald, except where noted:

- John Lennon – double-tracked lead vocal, 12-string acoustic guitar
- Paul McCartney – bass guitar
- George Harrison – acoustic guitar, lead guitars
- Ringo Starr – drums, tambourine

== Cover versions ==
- The song became a chart hit in autumn 1981 when it was recorded by Gary U.S. Bonds. His rendition reached number 43 on the UK Singles Chart.

== Sources ==
- Everett, Walter (2001). The Beatles as Musicians: The Quarry Men Through Rubber Soul. New York, NY: Oxford University Press. ISBN 0-19-514105-9.
- MacDonald, Ian (2005). Revolution in the Head: The Beatles' Records and the Sixties (2nd revised ed.). London: Pimlico. ISBN 978-1-84413-828-9.
- Winn, John C. (2008). Way Beyond Compare: The Beatles' Recorded Legacy, Volume One, 1957–1965. New York: Three Rivers Press. ISBN 978-0-307-45157-6.
