= Tell Me What You See =

1965 song by the Beatles

- Cover of the song's sheet music

Song by the Beatles

from the album Help!
- Released: 14 June 1965 (US: Beatles VI); 6 August 1965 (UK: Help!)
- Recorded: 18 February 1965
- Studio: EMI, London
- Genre: Folk rock
- Length: 2:36
- Label: Parlophone
- Songwriter: Lennon–McCartney
- Producer: George Martin

"Tell Me What You See" is a song by the English rock band the Beatles that first appeared in 1965 on their album Help! in the United Kingdom and on Beatles VI in the United States. The song is credited to Lennon–McCartney but mainly written by Paul McCartney. Regarding the song's authorship, McCartney said, "I seem to remember it as mine. I would claim it as a 60–40 but it might have been totally me." John Lennon said, in his interviews with Playboy (1980) and Hit Parader (1972), that "Tell Me What You See" was written completely by McCartney.

== Background and composition ==
Although "Tell Me What You See" is credited to the Lennon–McCartney songwriting partnership, both John Lennon and Paul McCartney identified it as being primarily written by McCartney. McCartney said in the 1997 biography Many Years from Now: "I seem to remember it as mine. I would claim it as a 60–40 but it might have been totally me." Asked about the song in 1980, Lennon simply said, "That's Paul." McCartney recalled little of its writing, later describing it as a filler track: "Not one of the better songs but they did a job, they were very handy for albums or B-sides. You need those kind of sides."

"Tell Me What You See" has been described as a folk rock song, foreshadowing the direction of the Beatles' next album, Rubber Soul. It is in the key of G major and is in common time. The song's second verse draws from a religious motto hung in Lennon's childhood home with his aunt Mimi Smith. Lennon himself would parody the lines in the story "Silly Norman" from his 1965 book A Spaniard in the Works:

Original motto	"Tell Me What You See"	"Silly Norman"
However black the clouds may be In time they'll pass away Have faith and trust and you will see God's light make bright your day	Big and black the clouds may be Time will pass away If you put your trust in me I'll make bright your day	However blackpool tower maybe, In time they'll bassaway. Have faith and trumpand B B C – Griffs' light make bright your day.

Author Kenneth Womack also suggests that the line "trying to get to you" was in reference to Elvis Presley's 1956 song "Tryin' to Get to You", which had also inspired McCartney's early composition "In Spite of All the Danger".

== Recording ==
The Beatles recorded "Tell Me What You See" on 18 February 1965, during the sessions for the soundtrack of their second feature film, Help! It was the last song recorded in the day, after Lennon's "You've Got to Hide Your Love Away" and the unsatisfactory attempt of "If You've Got Trouble". The session was held in EMI's Studio Two with George Martin producing and Norman Smith and Ken Scott engineering. The band achieved a satisfactory basic track in four takes, featuring McCartney playing his Höfner 500/1 bass, Lennon playing rhythm guitar on his Fender Stratocaster, Ringo Starr on drums, and George Harrison playing a güiro.

The band then added several overdubs to take four. McCartney and Lennon added vocals – McCartney on lead and Lennon on harmony, with McCartney then doubling his part. Starr added claves and maracas, Lennon added tambourine, and McCartney added an electric piano part to the break, played on a Hohner Pianet. (Note: The Beatles had used the Pianet for the first time the previous day, on "The Night Before" and "You Like Me Too Much".) Martin, Smith and Scott mixed the track for mono on 20 February and Smith and Malcolm Davies mixed it for stereo on 23 February.

== Other versions ==
George Martin recorded an instrumental version of "Tell Me What You See" for his 1965 easy listening album, George Martin and His Orchestra Play Help!

The American Christian rock band Jacob's Trouble covered the song for their 1989 debut album Door into Summer.

== Personnel ==
According to Kenneth Womack, except where otherwise indicated:

- Paul McCartney – lead vocal, bass, electric piano
- John Lennon – harmony vocal, rhythm guitar, tambourine
- George Harrison – güiro
- Ringo Starr – drums, claves, maracas
