= French Cloister at Versailles Gardens =

Monastery located in the Bahamas from the 14 century

Coordinates: 25°4′49″N 77°18′36″W

French Cloister at Versailles Gardens
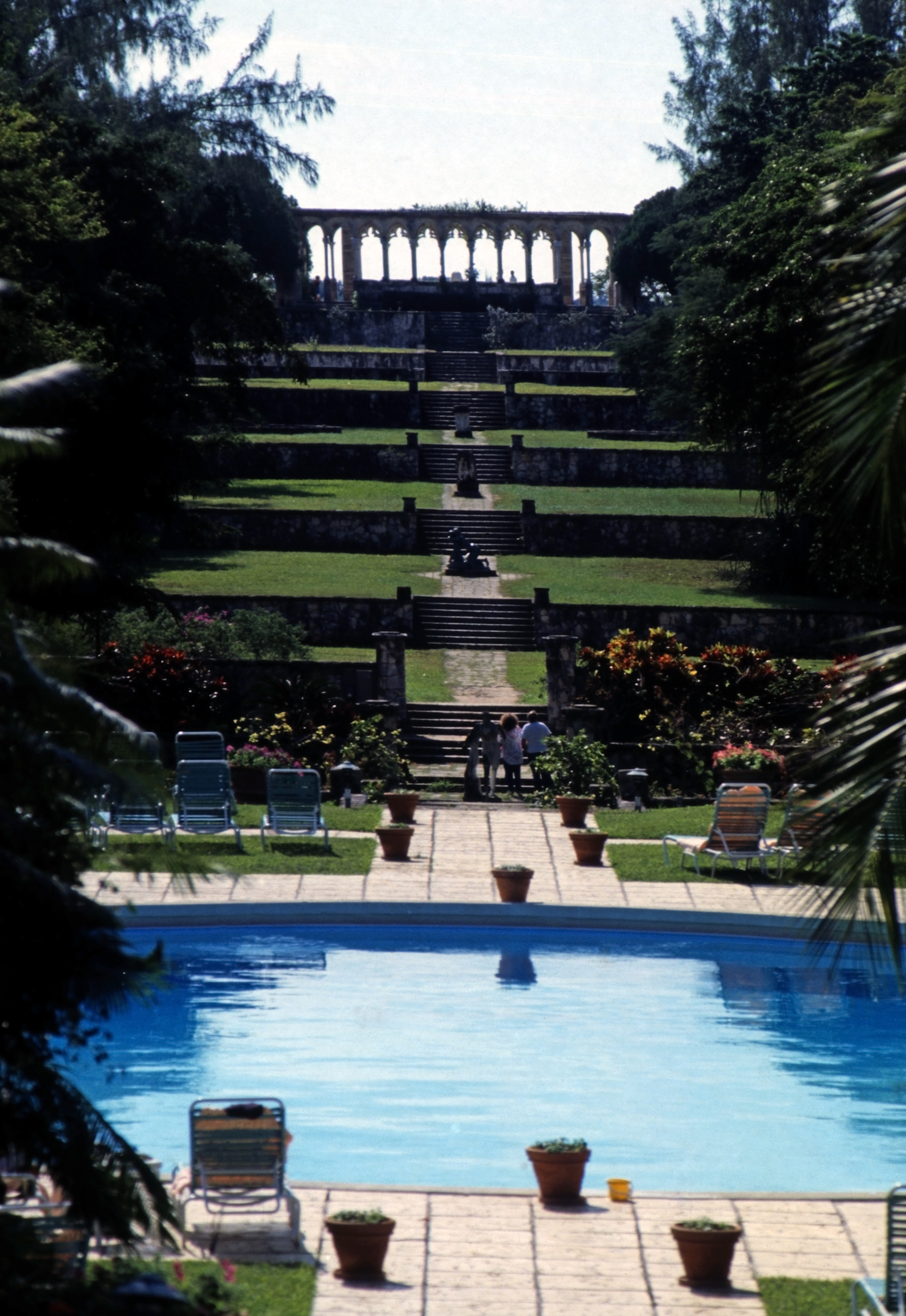
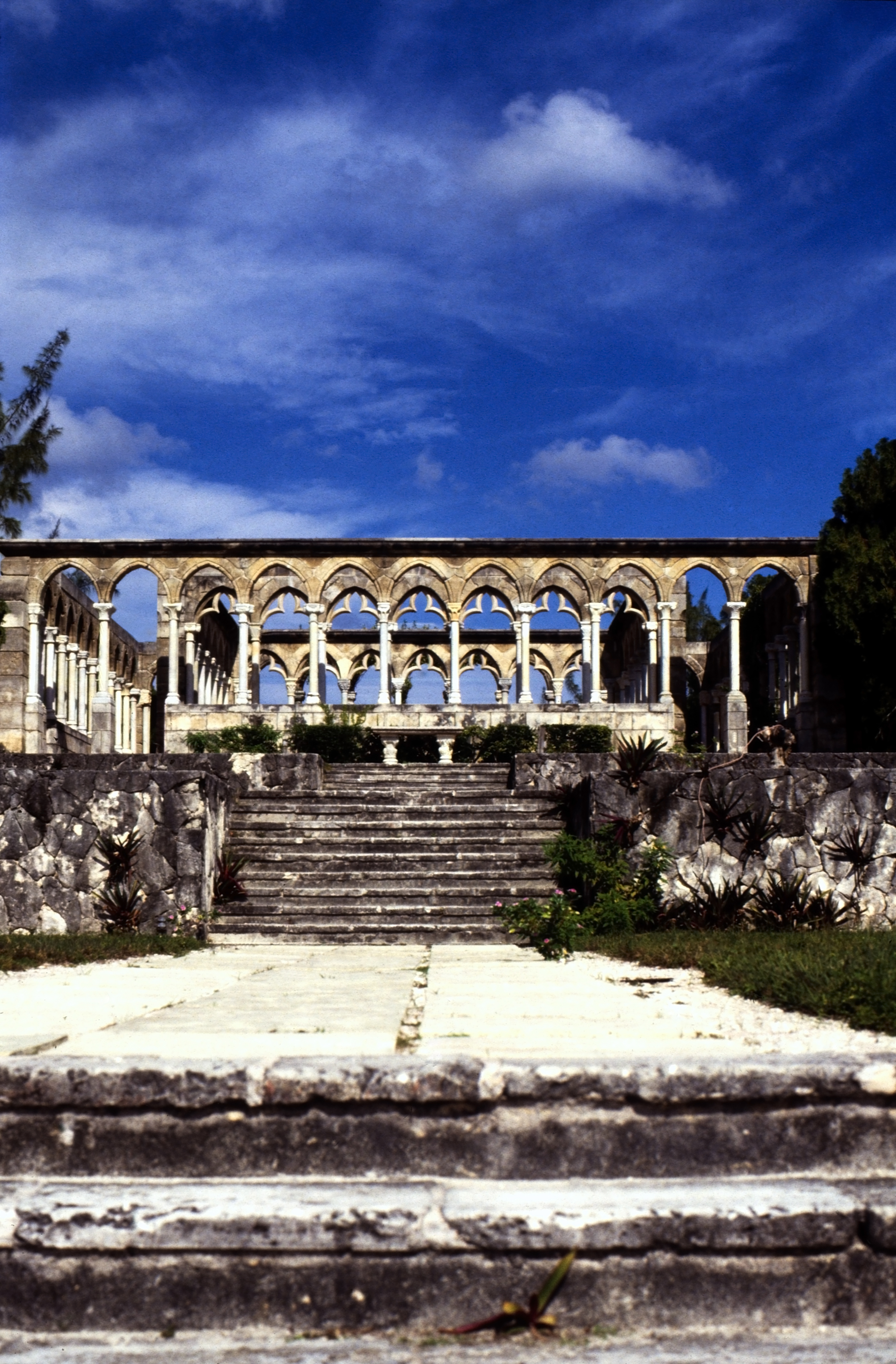

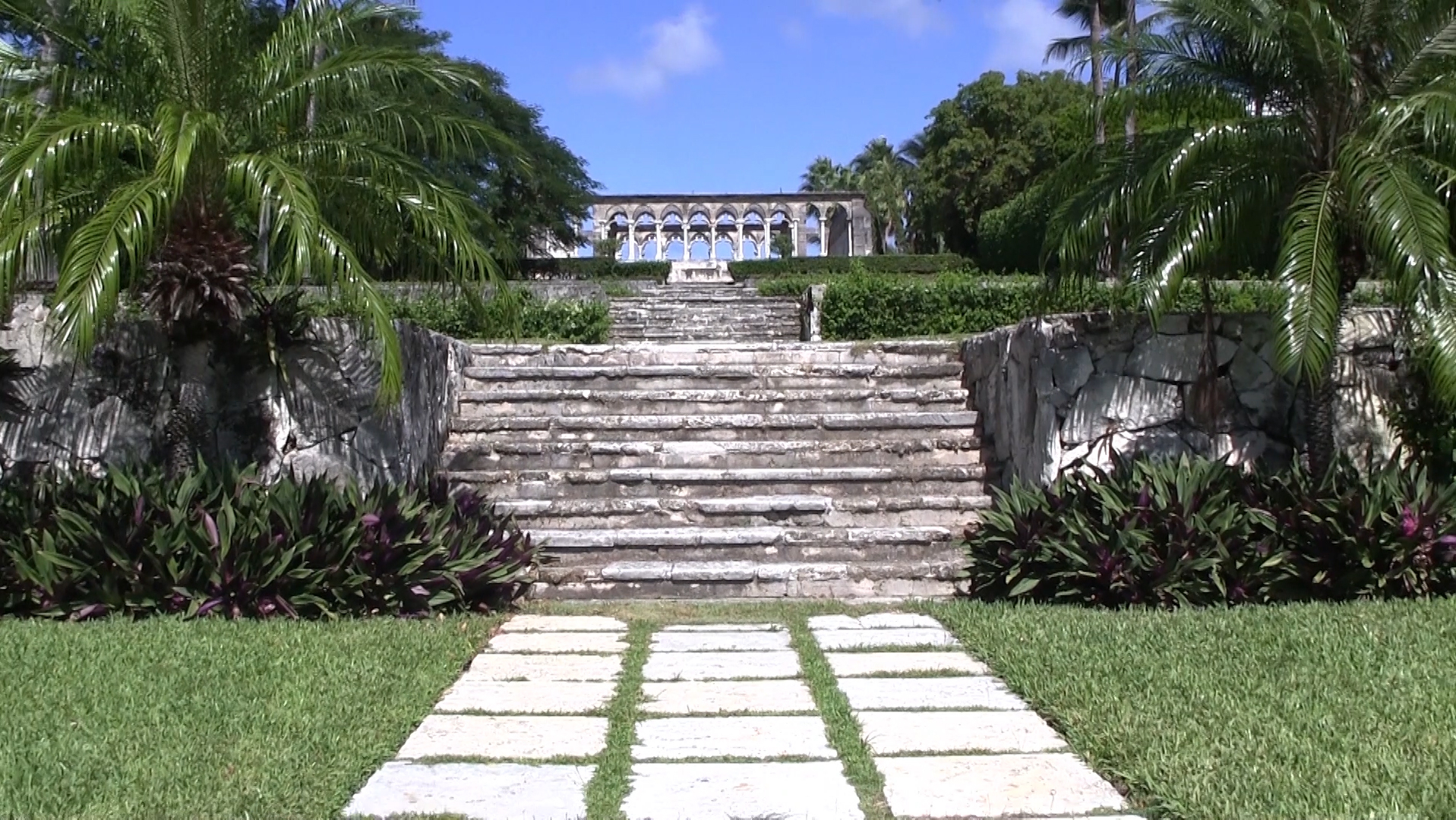
(This perspective (bottom) is known on The Beatles' 1965 movie Help!)

French cloister is situated in the northern Bahamas, on Paradise Island. It is from a 14th-century Augustinian monastery, dismantled and imported from Europe by William Randolph Hearst. Purchased while still in pieces from Hearst's estate by Huntington Hartford and reassembled stone by stone here as the centerpiece of the Versailles Gardens on Paradise Island. Overlooks Nassau Harbor to one side, and the One & Only Ocean Club resort to the other.

== Gallery ==
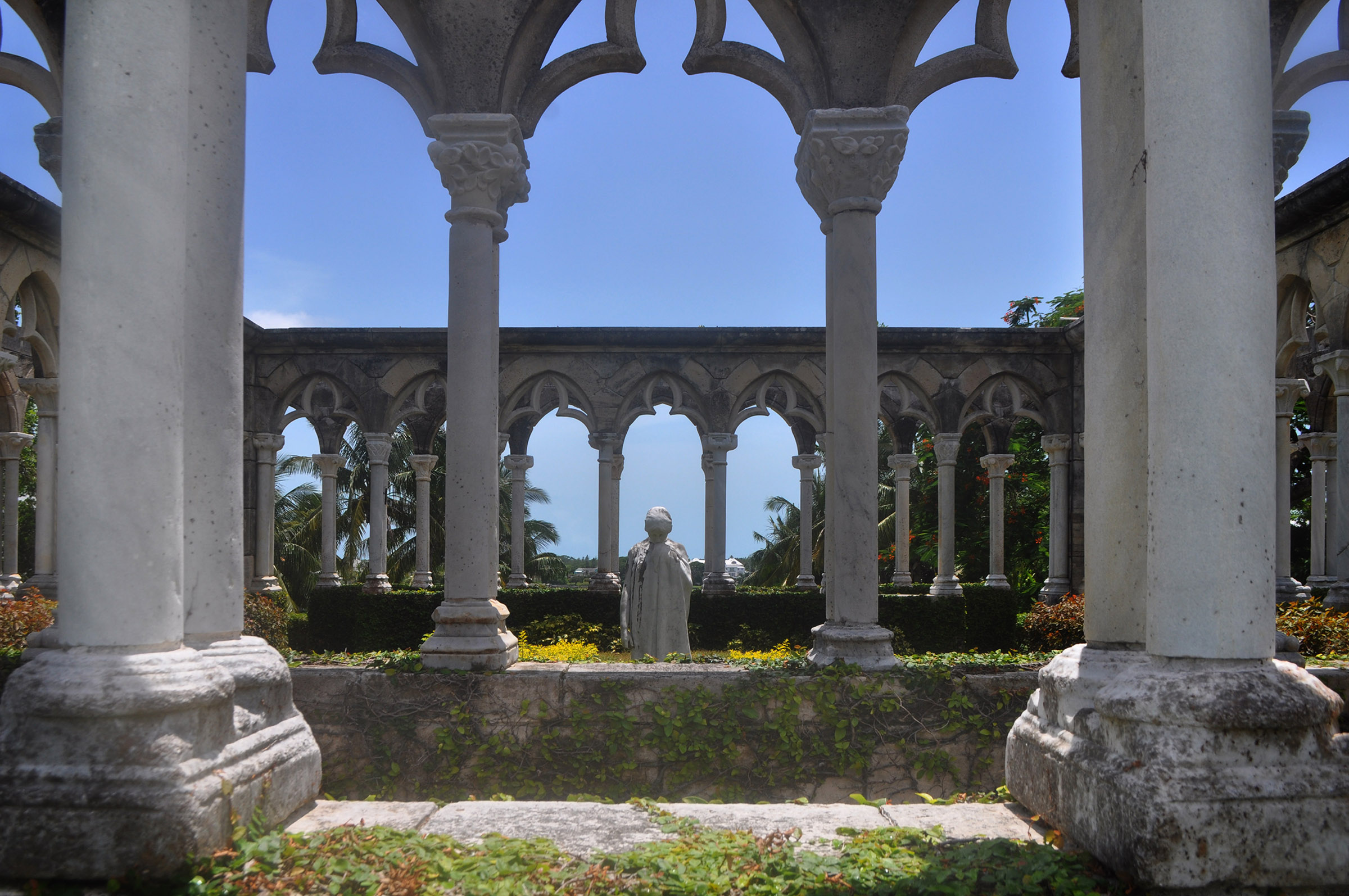
French Cloisters on Paradise Island

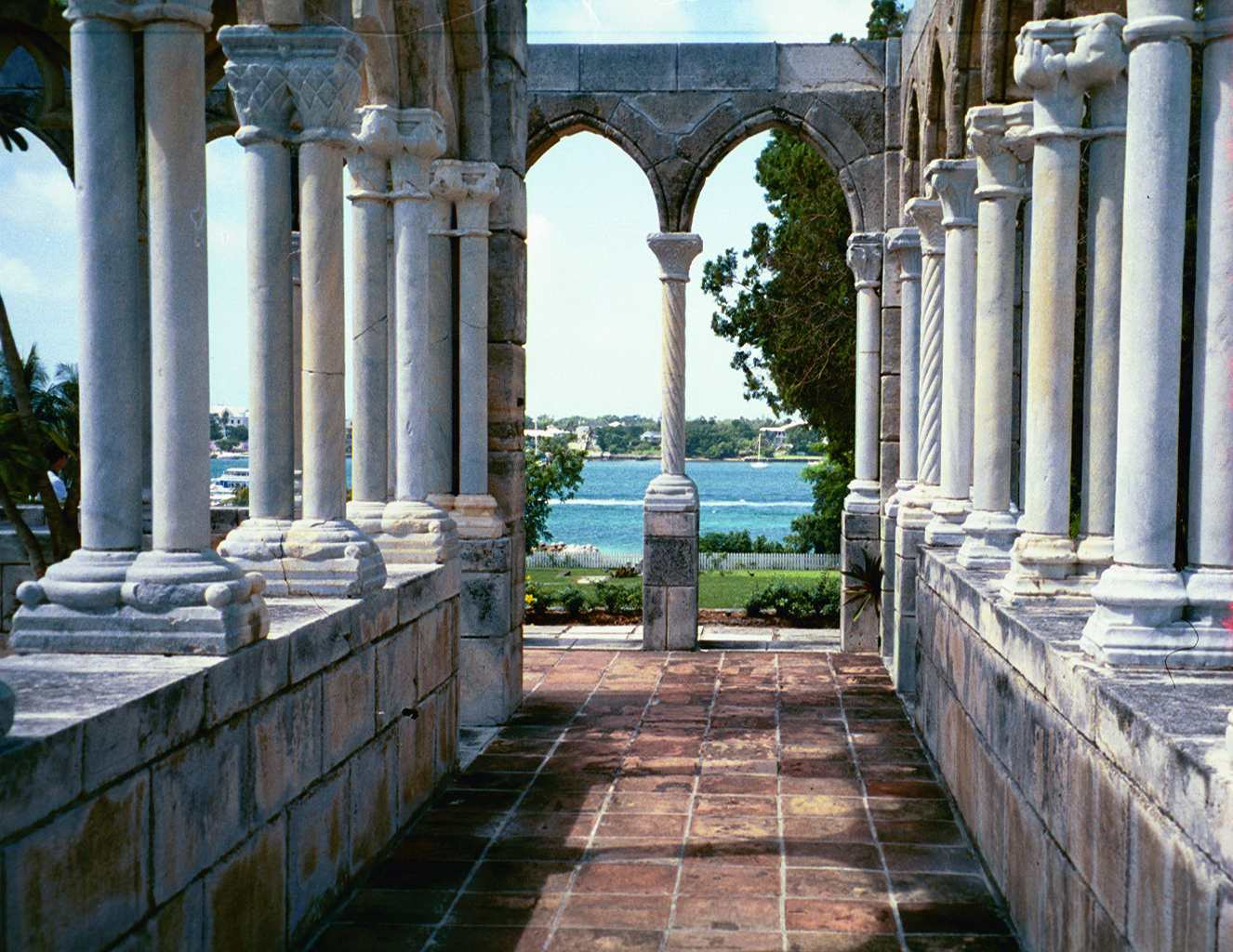
French Cloisters, interior

== See also ==
- Help! (film) ——————— 1965 movie of The Beatles
- Thunderball (film) ———— 1965 movie, the 14th in the James Bond series
- Casino Royale (2006 film) — the 21st in the James Bond series
