= Help! =

1965 studio album by the Beatles

Studio album by the Beatles
- Released: 6 August 1965
- Recorded: 15 February – 17 June 1965
- Studios: EMI, London
- Genres: Folk rock; pop rock
- Length: 33:44
- Label: Parlophone
- Producer: George Martin

The Beatles chronology
Beatles for Sale (1964)	Help! (1965)	Rubber Soul (1965)

The Beatles North American chronology
Beatles VI (1965)	Help! (1965)	Rubber Soul (1965)

Singles from Help!
- 1. "Ticket to Ride" Released: 9 April 1965; 2. "Help!" Released: 23 July 1965

Help! is the fifth studio album by the English rock band the Beatles and the soundtrack to the film Help!. It was released on 6 August 1965 by Parlophone. Seven of the fourteen songs, including the singles "Help!" and "Ticket to Ride", appeared in the film and take up the first side of the vinyl album. The second side includes "Yesterday", the most-covered song ever written. The album was met with favourable critical reviews and topped the Australian, German, British and American charts.

During the recording sessions for the album, the Beatles continued to explore the studio's multitracking capabilities to layer their sound. "Yesterday" features a string quartet, the band's first use of Baroque sensibilities, and "You've Got to Hide Your Love Away" includes a flute section. The North American release is a true soundtrack album, combining the first seven songs with instrumental music from the film. The omitted tracks are instead spread across the Capitol Records LPs Beatles VI, Rubber Soul and Yesterday and Today.

In the US, Help! marked the start of artistic recognition for the Beatles from mainstream critics, including comparisons to the European art music tradition. It was nominated in the category of Album of the Year at the 1966 Grammys Awards, marking the first time that a rock band had been recognised in this category. In 2000, it was voted 119th in the third edition of Colin Larkin's book All Time Top 1000 Albums. In 2020, it was ranked 266th on Rolling Stone magazine's list of the "500 Greatest Albums of All Time". In September 2013, after the British Phonographic Industry changed its sales award rules, Help! was certified platinum for recorded sales since 1994.

== Background ==
In 1964, the Beatles appeared in their first feature film, A Hard Day's Night. Despite initial scepticism, reviews were near universal in their acclaim, elevating the Beatles' prestige as artists. Intending to make one film a year, work began on a second Beatles picture for a 1965 release. It would once again be directed by Richard Lester and produced by Walter Shenson, but written by Marc Behm and Charles Wood instead of Alun Owen. It was given the working title Eight Arms to Hold You, one of Ringo Starr's "Ringoisms"; the name stuck until early April, long enough to even appear on the US "Ticket to Ride" single, but John Lennon and Paul McCartney presumed it would be too difficult to write a compelling song with that title, so Help! was chosen instead.

According to McCartney, most of the songwriting for Help! was done at Kenwood, Lennon's house in Weybridge. McCartney also wrote some songs, e.g. "Yesterday" and "I've Just Seen a Face", at his girlfriend Jane Asher's family home, 57 Wimpole Street in London. At this time, the Beatles were heavily influenced by Bob Dylan, especially Lennon, who later referred to it as his "Dylan period". Mark Hertsgaard writes that while Dylan's influence was "evident" on Beatles for Sale, Help! is where it became "fully realized". Additionally, Help! is the first Beatles album on which drugs made a significant impact. Dylan in 1964 had introduced them to cannabis, which they smoked habitually while filming Help!, and they first encountered LSD in spring 1965. According to Alexis Petridis, drugs motivated the Beatles on Help! to take their songwriting to "new emotional depths", such as on "You've Got to Hide Your Love Away" and "Ticket to Ride".

== Recording and production ==
=== Recording history ===
Following their Christmas 1964 shows, the Beatles took a month's break before beginning work on Help! All of the recording sessions took place in Studio Two of EMI Recording Studios (now Abbey Road Studios). The first set of sessions began on 15 February with "Ticket to Ride" and continued through the 20th, after which the group flew to the Bahamas to begin filming. They took with them a tape of the 11 songs recorded so that Lester and Shenson could decide which ones to use in the film.

Several songs recorded during these initial sessions were not included on the Help! album. Lennon's "Yes It Is" was relegated to the B-side of the "Ticket to Ride" single and a cover of Larry Williams' "Bad Boy" was put on the North American album Beatles VI. Two Lennon–McCartney compositions were rejected for release altogether. The first was "If You've Got Trouble", originally written for Ringo Starr as his obligatory lead vocal for the album. One take was attempted on 18 February before it was abandoned. The other was "That Means a Lot". Two versions were attempted, one on 20 February and a "re-make" on 30 March, but it was ultimately given to a friend of the band, singer P. J. Proby, to record. Proby's version was released as a single and reached number 30 on the UK chart. Both "If You've Got Trouble" and take 1 of "That Means a Lot" were eventually released on Anthology 2 in 1996, along with other outtakes from the Help! sessions. Additionally, the last song recorded in this time was "Wait", which would not be released until the Beatles' next album, Rubber Soul.

According to Mark Lewisohn, 14 June 1965 saw "[a] remarkable day's work" and showcased McCartney's musical abilities in varying styles; the Beatles recorded his songs "I've Just Seen a Face", "I'm Down", and "Yesterday". "Yesterday" began with just McCartney singing and playing acoustic guitar, but he and producer George Martin decided to add a string quartet. Martin later described it as when, "I started to leave my hallmark on [the Beatles'] music, when a style started to emerge which was partly of my making." "I'm Down" was released as the B-side of "Help!" but not included on the album.

=== Innovations and techniques ===
We still haven't made the sort of sound we want to, and we don't even know what we're after.

— John Lennon during the recording of Help!

Lewisohn writes that 1965 introduced the part of the Beatles' career where they put less focus on live performances and took "a more serious application in the recording studio." He identifies multiple new recording practices used on Help!, one being "to rehearse songs with a tape machine running, spooling back to record properly over the rehearsed material." Another involved adding numerous overdubs to rhythm tracks without considering them as comprising new takes; because of this, many songs on Help! are documented as having needed only a small number of takes, yet they still required hours of work. Martin also began placing the guitar parts on different tracks than the bass and drums, accomplishing "a more satisfying stereo image" according to Walter Everett.

According to Hertsgaard, Help! showed "a major acceleration in the Beatles' ongoing search for fresh sounds." He points out that half of the songs feature instruments the Beatles had never used before, including electric piano, flutes, a volume/tone pedal, and most famously "Yesterday"'s strings. Help! is also the first Beatles album to feature the Epiphone Casino, first purchased by McCartney around December 1964 before quickly becoming a staple of the group's instrumentation. Before the recording of "Yesterday", the flutes on "You've Got to Hide Your Love Away" were played by John Scott, only the second outside musician to appear on a Beatles track (after Andy White).

== Songs ==
=== Side one ===
The song "Help!" was written primarily by Lennon. He originally conceived it at a slower tempo and regretted speeding it up to make it more commercial. Although it was only written out of need for a titular song, Lennon remained extremely proud of "Help!" from the Beatles' break-up to his death, even once calling it his favorite Beatles song he wrote. He felt it was one of his "real" songs, explaining in an interview: "The whole Beatle thing was just beyond comprehension. I was eating and drinking like a pig and I was fat as a pig, dissatisfied with myself ... later, I knew I was really crying out for help. So it was my fat Elvis period."

McCartney's "The Night Before" is the first Beatles song to feature electric piano, played by Lennon. McCartney and George Harrison played the guitar solo together, doubling each other in octaves.

Lennon specified "You've Got to Hide Your Love Away" as exemplifying his "Dylan period". A connection has been suggested between the lyric and Beatles manager Brian Epstein's homosexuality, which he kept private due to British law at the time.

"I Need You" was George Harrison's first songwriting contribution since "Don't Bother Me" in 1963. He wrote it for his girlfriend Pattie Boyd, whom he met while filming A Hard Day's Night. Its unusual guitar sound was achieved using a volume/tone pedal – the first time a guitar pedal was used on a Beatles song. A year after Harrison's death in 2001, Tom Petty sang it at the Concert for George.

McCartney wrote "Another Girl" while holidaying at a villa in Hammamet, Tunisia. He played lead guitar on the track as Harrison was struggling with it.

"You're Going to Lose That Girl" was written by Lennon and McCartney together, though McCartney credited it 60–40 to Lennon. Some have interpreted it as a continuation of "She Loves You" due to it revisiting the theme of a love triangle.

"Ticket to Ride" was another song Lennon and McCartney wrote together, but they later disagreed on how much each of them contributed. Lennon said in 1980, "Paul's contribution was the way Ringo played the drums." In Many Years from Now, McCartney responded: "John just didn't take the time to explain that we sat down together and worked on that song for a three-hour songwriting session, and at the end of it we had all the words, we had the harmonies, and we had all the little bits. ... We wrote the melody together ... Because John sang it, you might have to give him 60 per cent of it."

The meaning of the phrase "ticket to ride" has been debated. As was rumoured at the time, it was partially inspired by the town Ryde in the Isle of Wight, where McCartney's cousin owned a pub that he and Lennon had performed at in the early 1960s. Another story goes that Lennon used "ticket to ride" to refer to cards given to prostitutes in Hamburg by health authorities. Lennon touted the song as "one of the earliest heavy metal records made."

=== Side two ===
"Act Naturally", written by Johnny Russell and first recorded by Buck Owens in 1963, was chosen by Ringo Starr to be his vocal contribution to the album. Recorded at the end of the Help! sessions, it was the last-recorded cover song the Beatles would officially release until "Maggie Mae" in 1970. In 1989, Owens and Starr recorded another version together.

"It's Only Love" was originally written by Lennon under the title "That's a Nice Hat (Cap)". Five guitar layers were used on the track, including Harrison's which was run through a Leslie speaker. Lennon was highly critical of the song in later years: "That's the one song I really hate of mine. Terrible lyric."

"You Like Me Too Much" began the precedent of Harrison providing two or more songs to each Beatles album. It once again features Lennon on electric piano, but also George Martin and McCartney on a Steinway grand piano.

For "Tell Me What You See", McCartney drew inspiration for his lyrics from a religious verse that hung on a wall in Lennon's childhood home. McCartney later described it as a filler song, "Not awfully memorable."

McCartney wrote "I've Just Seen a Face" at the home of his girlfriend Jane Asher's family, at 57 Wimpole Street in London. It would become one of McCartney's favorite Beatles songs and among the only ones he would perform with his later band Wings.

The album's penultimate track, "Yesterday", came partially to McCartney in his sleep. He spent about a month playing it to people to make sure he had not plagiarised it. He then wrote working lyrics for it under the title "Scrambled Eggs". "Yesterday" was later recognized by Guinness World Records as the most-covered pop song in history.

The album ends with a cover of Larry Williams' "Dizzy Miss Lizzy". Lennon in particular was a fan of Williams and, along with "Bad Boy", the Beatles also recorded his song "Slow Down".

== Album cover ==
H	E	L	P
N	U	J	V
N	V	U	J

The album cover shows the Beatles with their arms positioned to spell out a word in flag semaphore. According to cover photographer Robert Freeman, "I had the idea of semaphore spelling out the letters 'HELP'. But when we came to do the shot, the arrangement of the arms with those letters didn't look good. So we decided to improvise and ended up with the best graphic positioning of the arms."

On the UK Parlophone release, the letters formed by the Beatles appear to be "NUJV", while the slightly re-arranged US release on Capitol Records appeared to indicate the letters "NVUJ", with McCartney's left hand pointing to the Capitol logo. The Capitol LP was issued in a "deluxe" gatefold sleeve with several photos from the film and was priced $1 more than standard Capitol releases at the time.

== Compact disc release ==
There have been four CD releases of Help!. The first was on 30 April 1987, using the 14-song UK track line-up. Having been available only as an import in the US in the past, the original 14-track UK version replaced the original US version with its release on LP and cassette as well on 21 July 1987. As with the CD release of the 1965 Rubber Soul album, the Help! CD featured a contemporary stereo digital remix of the album prepared by Martin in 1986. Martin had expressed concern to EMI over the original 1965 stereo mix, claiming it sounded "very woolly, and not at all what I thought should be a good issue". Martin went back to the original four-track tapes and remixed them for stereo. One of the most notable changes is the echo added to "Dizzy Miss Lizzy", something that was not evident on the original mix of the LP.

When the album was originally released on CD in Canada, pressings were imported from other countries, and used the 1987 remix. However, when the Disque Améric and Cinram plants in Canada started pressing the album, the original 1965 stereo mix was used by mistake. This was the only source for the 1965 stereo mix in its entirety until the release of the mono box set in 2009.

The 2009 remastered stereo CD was released on 9 September. It was "created from the original stereo digital master tapes from Martin's CD mixes made in 1986". The original 1965 stereo mix was included as a bonus on the mono CD contained in The Beatles in Mono boxed set.

The 1965 stereo mix was reissued again on the Help! CD contained in the Beatles collection The Japan Box released in 2014.

== Critical reception ==
=== Contemporary reviews ===
Help! was another worldwide critical success for the Beatles. Derek Johnson of the NME said that the LP "maintains the Beatles' usual high standards" and was a "gay, infectious romp which doesn't let up in pace or sparkle from start to finish – with the exception of one slow track". Despite the band's introduction of new instrumentation into their sound, particularly a string quartet on "Yesterday", the reviewer also wrote of the album: "It's typical Beatles material, and offers very few surprises. But then, who wants surprises from the Beatles?" While typical of the light and snappy pop music reviews at the time, according to music journalist Michael Halpin, these comments angered McCartney, who, like his bandmates, believed that artists should constantly develop through their work.

In the United States, where the mainstream press had long focused on the Beatlemania phenomenon and had derided the group's music, as well as rock 'n' roll generally, the summer of 1965 coincided with the first examples of artistic recognition for the Beatles from the country's cultural mainstream. Among these endorsements, Richard Freed of The New York Times likened the band's songs to works from the European art music tradition. Adding to what he described as the Beatles' impact on "serious music", Freed cited musicologists and composers such as Leonard Bernstein and Abram Chasins as admirers of the group's work. Along with several nominations for "Yesterday", Help! was nominated in the category of Album of the Year at the 1966 Grammys Awards. The nomination marked the first time that a rock band had been recognised in this category.

=== Retrospective assessments ===
Professional ratings
Review scores
Source	Rating
AllMusic	5/5 stars
The A.V. Club	A
Chicago Sun-Times	4/4 stars
Consequence of Sound	B
The Daily Telegraph	4/5 stars
Encyclopedia of Popular Music	5/5 stars
MusicHound	3.5/5
Paste	100/100
Pitchfork	9.2/10
The Rolling Stone Album Guide	5/5 stars

In his review of the Beatles' 1987 CD releases, for Rolling Stone magazine, Steve Pond remarked on the "unstoppable momentum" evident in the band's pre-Rubber Soul albums and recommended Help! "for the relatively quiet and understated way in which they consolidated their strengths". Writing in 2004 edition of The Rolling Stone Album Guide, Rob Sheffield says that the US version of Help! was "utterly ruined" through the replacement of the Beatles songs with the soundtrack music, and that, as a result, the album remained relatively overlooked. He describes the full album as "a big step forward" and "the first chapter in the astounding creative takeoff the Beatles were just beginning".

Mark Kemp of Paste considers it to be the equal of A Hard Day's Night and cites "Help!", "Ticket to Ride" and "Act Naturally" as highlights, along with Harrison's return as a songwriter. Kemp identifies "Yesterday" as "the album's masterpiece" and a song that "set the stage for one of the most groundbreaking and innovative periods in The Beatles' career, not to mention pop music in general". Neil McCormick of The Daily Telegraph says that the album evokes "a band in transition, shifting slightly uncomfortably from the pop thrills of Beatlemania to something more mature", with Lennon's writing increasingly autobiographical and the group's sound growing more sophisticated. McCormick concludes: "Help! may not be their greatest album, but it contains some of their greatest early songs."

In 2000, Help! was voted 119th in the third edition of Colin Larkin's book All Time Top 1000 Albums. In 2006, it was recognised as one of the "Most Significant Rock Albums" in the Greenwood Encyclopedia of Rock History. Two years before then, Tor Milde, music critic for the Norwegian newspaper Verdens Gang, ranked it at number 20 on his list of "The 100 Best Pop and Rock Albums of All Time". In 2003, Rolling Stone ranked Help! number 332 on their list of the "500 Greatest Albums of All Time", raising the ranking to number 331 in the 2012 update and then number 266 in the 2020 list.

== Track listing ==
All tracks are written by Lennon–McCartney, except where noted.

Side one
No.	Title	Writer(s)	Lead vocals	Length
1.	"Help!"		Lennon	2:18
2.	"The Night Before"		McCartney	2:34
3.	"You've Got to Hide Your Love Away"		Lennon	2:09
4.	"I Need You"	George Harrison	Harrison	2:28
5.	"Another Girl"		McCartney	2:05
6.	"You're Going to Lose That Girl"		Lennon	2:18
7.	"Ticket to Ride"		Lennon with McCartney	3:09
Total length:				17:01

Side two
No.	Title	Writer(s)	Lead vocals	Length
1.	"Act Naturally"	Morrison–Russell	Starr	2:30
2.	"It's Only Love"		Lennon	1:56
3.	"You Like Me Too Much"	Harrison	Harrison	2:36
4.	"Tell Me What You See"		McCartney with Lennon	2:37
5.	"I've Just Seen a Face"		McCartney	2:05
6.	"Yesterday"		McCartney	2:05
7.	"Dizzy Miss Lizzy"	Larry Williams	Lennon	2:54
Total length:				16:43

== North American Capitol release ==
Help!

Soundtrack album by the Beatles and Ken Thorne
- Released: 13 August 1965
- Recorded: 15 February – 17 June 1965
- Studios: EMI, London
- Genres: Rock; instrumental
- Length: 29:34
- Label: Capitol
- Producers: George Martin, Dave Dexter, Jr.

The Beatles North American chronology
Beatles VI (1965)	Help! (1965)	Rubber Soul (1965)

Singles from Help!
- 1. "Ticket to Ride" Released: 19 April 1965; 2. "Help!" Released: 19 July 1965

The North American version, the band's eighth Capitol Records album and tenth overall, includes the songs in the film plus selections from the film's orchestral score composed and conducted by Ken Thorne, which contains one of the first uses of the Indian sitar on a rock/pop album, and its very first use on a Beatles record. "Ticket to Ride" is the only song on the American release in Duophonic stereo (also known as "fake stereo") reprocessed from the mono mix. Likewise, the mono version of the album uses a folded-down stereo mix of "Help!" instead of the true mono version used on the single, which features a different vocal track. Help! is available on CD as part of The Capitol Albums, Volume 2 box set. This CD contains both the stereo and mono fold-down versions as heard on the American LP release. A second CD release of this album, which contains the seven songs in true mono mixes, was issued in 2014 individually and as part of the Beatles' The U.S. Albums box set.

All of the non-film tracks from side two of the Parlophone album were spread out through three American albums. Three were already issued on the previously released Beatles VI: "You Like Me Too Much", "Tell Me What You See" and "Dizzy Miss Lizzy". "I've Just Seen A Face" and "It's Only Love" were placed on the Capitol Rubber Soul, with its follow-up album Yesterday and Today receiving the remaining two tracks: "Yesterday" and "Act Naturally".

The American version of Help! reached the number one spot on the Billboard Top LPs chart for nine weeks starting on 11 September 1965.

=== Track listing ===
All tracks are written by Lennon–McCartney, except where noted.

Side one
No.	Title	Writer(s)	Lead vocals	Length
1.	"Help!" (preceded by an uncredited instrumental intro based on the "James Bond Theme")		Lennon	2:39
2.	"The Night Before"		McCartney	2:36
3.	"From Me to You Fantasy"	Lennon–McCartney; arranged by Thorne	instrumental	2:08
4.	"You've Got to Hide Your Love Away"		Lennon	2:12
5.	"I Need You"	Harrison	Harrison	2:31
6.	"In the Tyrol"	Ken Thorne	instrumental	2:26
Total length:				14:32

Side two
No.	Title	Writer(s)	Lead vocals	Length
1.	"Another Girl"		McCartney	2:08
2.	"Another Hard Day's Night"	Lennon–McCartney; arranged by Thorne	instrumental	2:31
3.	"Ticket to Ride"		Lennon	3:07
4.	"The Bitter End/You Can't Do That"	Ken Thorne/Lennon–McCartney; arranged by Thorne	instrumental	2:26
5.	"You're Gonna Lose That Girl"		Lennon	2:19
6.	"The Chase"	Ken Thorne	instrumental	2:31
Total length:				15:02

== Charts ==
=== Charts ===
Weekly chart performance for Help!
Chart (1965)	Peak position
Australian Kent Music Report	1
Finnish Albums Chart	1
UK Record Retailer LPs Chart	1
US Billboard Top LPs	1
Chart (1987)	Peak position
Dutch Albums (Album Top 100)	62
UK Albums Chart	61
US Billboard Top Compact Disks	4
Chart (2009)	Peak position
Austrian Albums (Ö3 Austria)	62
Belgian Albums (Ultratop Flanders)	48
Belgian Albums (Ultratop Wallonia)	62
Dutch Albums (Album Top 100)	64
Finnish Albums (Suomen virallinen lista)	26
Italian Albums (FIMI)	50
New Zealand Albums (RMNZ)	35
Portuguese Albums (AFP)	18
Spanish Albums (Promusicae)	53
Swedish Albums (Sverigetopplistan)	30
Swiss Albums (Schweizer Hitparade)	53
UK Albums Chart	29
Chart (2010)	Peak position
US Billboard 200	160

== Certifications and sales ==
In the US, the album sold 1,314,457 copies by 31 December 1965 and 1,594,032 copies by the end of the decade.

Original release

Region	Certification	Certified units/sales
Argentina (CAPIF)	Platinum	60,000^{^}
Australia (ARIA)	Gold	35,000^{^}
Brazil	—	320,000
Germany	—	100,000
Italy (FIMI) sales since 2009	Gold	25,000^{‡}
United Kingdom (BPI) sales since 1994	Platinum	300,000^{*}
^{*} Sales figures based on certification alone.^{^} Shipments figures based on certification alone.^{‡} Sales+streaming figures based on certification alone.

North American release

Region	Certification	Certified units/sales
Canada (Music Canada)	2× Platinum	200,000^{^}
United States (RIAA)	3× Platinum	3,000,000^{^}
^{^} Shipments figures based on certification alone.

== Personnel ==
According to Mark Lewisohn and Alan W. Pollack.

The Beatles

- John Lennon – lead, harmony and background vocals; rhythm and acoustic guitars; electric piano, organ on "Dizzy Miss Lizzy"; tambourine on "Tell Me What You See"; snare drum on "I Need You"
- Paul McCartney – lead, harmony and background vocals; bass, acoustic and lead guitars; piano, electric piano
- George Harrison – harmony and background vocals; lead, acoustic and rhythm guitars; lead vocals on "I Need You" and "You Like Me Too Much"; güiro on "Tell Me What You See"
- Ringo Starr – drums and miscellaneous percussion; claves on "Tell Me What You See"; lead vocals on "Act Naturally"

Additional musicians

- George Martin – producer; piano on "You Like Me Too Much"
- John Scott – tenor and alto flutes on "You've Got to Hide Your Love Away"
- String quartet on "Yesterday", arranged by Martin in association with McCartney

== Surround versions ==
The songs included in the soundtrack of the film Help! (tracks 1–7) were mixed into 5.1 surround sound for the film's 2007 DVD release.

== Release history ==
Country	Date	Label	Format	Catalog
United Kingdom	6 August 1965	Parlophone	mono LP	PMC 1255
United Kingdom	6 August 1965	Parlophone	stereo LP	PCS 3071
United States	13 August 1965	Capitol	mono LP	MAS 2386
United States	13 August 1965	Capitol	stereo LP	SMAS 2386
Worldwide reissue	15 April 1987	Apple, Parlophone, EMI	Compact Disc	CDP 7 46439 2
United States	21 July 1987	Capitol	stereo LP	CLJ 46439
Japan	11 March 1998	Toshiba-EMI	CD	TOCP 51115
Japan	21 January 2004	Toshiba-EMI	Remastered LP	TOJP 60135
Worldwide reissue	11 April 2006	Apple/Capitol/EMI	CD reissue of US LP	CDP 0946 3 57500 2 7
Worldwide reissue	9 September 2009	Apple/Capitol/EMI	CD stereo remaster	CDP 0946 3 82415 2 2

== See also ==
- Outline of the Beatles
- The Beatles timeline
- The Beatles albums discography
