= Yes It Is =

- US picture sleeve (Reverse)

Single by the Beatles
- A-side: "Ticket to Ride"
- Released: 9 April 1965
- Recorded: 16 February 1965
- Studio: EMI, London
- Genre: Pop
- Length: 2:41
- Label: Parlophone
- Songwriter: Lennon–McCartney
- Producer: George Martin

The Beatles UK singles chronology
"I Feel Fine" (1964)	"Ticket to Ride" / "Yes It Is" (1965)	"Help!" (1965)

The Beatles US singles chronology
"Eight Days a Week" (1965)	"Ticket to Ride" / "Yes It Is" (1965)	"Help!" (1965)

"Yes It Is" is a song by the English rock band the Beatles. Written by John Lennon (credited to Lennon–McCartney), it was first released in 1965 as the B-side to "Ticket to Ride". It features some of the Beatles' most complex and dissonant three-part vocal harmonies and showcases George Harrison's early use of volume pedal guitar. Ian MacDonald describes the song as having "rich and unusual harmonic motion."

== Composition ==
In his 1980 interview with Playboy, John Lennon described "Yes It Is" as an attempt to rewrite "This Boy" that "didn't quite work". Paul McCartney on the other hand described it as "a very fine song of John's" that he and Lennon had finished writing together.

== Musical structure ==
The song is in the 12/8 time signature, in the key of E and begins (on "If you wear red tonight ...") with a I–IV–ii^{7}–V^{7} chord progression (E–A–F♯m^{7}–B^{7}) in which the word "tonight" (B melody note) appears as a "delicately haunting" 4th above the F♯m^{7}, creating a suspension. The melodic pitches of this first two bar phrase are repeated (with initial repetition of the G♯ melody note) on "remember what I said tonight," except that the B melody note on the second "tonight" is now backed by a ♭VII (D) chord that shapes the B melody note into a more "luscious" 6th. The chorus ("Yes it is, it's true. Yes it is, it's true") involves a I (E chord) – III (G♯ chord) – IV (A chord) – I (E chord) progression in which the major III (G♯) chord appears for the first time in the song to propel the plagal drop from IV (A) to the tonic I (E) chord.

== Recording ==
Over the course of a five-hour recording session, the Beatles attempted 14 takes of the basic track before perfecting it. "Yes It Is" was recorded on 16 February 1965, the same day that they completed Harrison's "I Need You". After finalising the rhythm track, Lennon, McCartney and Harrison recorded their vocal harmonies in three hours, singing live together, following the suggestion of George Martin that they sing their three-part harmony in the style of a barbershop quartet.

== Release and reception ==
"Yes It Is" was released as the B-side of the "Ticket to Ride" single in both the U.S. and the UK. American pressings of the single erroneously show "Yes It Is" as being from the film Eight Arms to Hold You (the original title for the film, Help!), in which it did not appear. It reached number 46 in the Billboard Hot 100.

The song was included on Beatles VI in the U.S., using the "duophonic" stereo remix from the original mono track, with additional echo and reverb added, and on compilation albums, including Love Songs, the British version of the Rarities album; Only the Beatles, an unauthorised British promotional cassette for Heineken Beer in 1986, on which it made its first true stereo appearance, Past Masters, Volume One, and on Anthology 2 in an alternate version that combines the second and fourteenth takes. The original mono single mix appears on Mono Masters, issued as a three-CD set in the 2009 The Beatles in Mono box and as a three-LP set in the 2014 The Beatles in Mono vinyl box.

Author Ian MacDonald praised "Yes It Is", along with its accompanying A-side, "Ticket to Ride". He described both songs as "psychologically deeper than The Beatles had ever recorded before" and declared that they marked a huge step forward in the Beatles' development as songwriters.

== Personnel ==
According to Ian MacDonald:

- John Lennon – double-tracked lead vocal, classical guitar
- Paul McCartney – harmony vocal, bass guitar
- George Harrison – harmony vocal, lead guitar
- Ringo Starr – drums, tambourine

== Charts ==
Chart performance for "Yes It Is"
Chart (1965)	Peak position
US Billboard Hot 100	46

== Sources ==
- "Help". Beatles Interview Database. 2009.
- Harry, Bill (2000). The Beatles Encyclopedia: Revised and Updated. London: Virgin Publishing. ISBN 0-7535-0481-2.
- Lewisohn, Mark (1988). The Beatles Recording Sessions. New York: Harmony Books. ISBN 0-517-57066-1.
- MacDonald, Ian (2005). Revolution in the Head: The Beatles' Records and the Sixties (Second Revised ed.). London: Pimlico (Rand). ISBN 1-84413-828-3.
- Pedler, Dominic (2003). The Songwriting Secrets of the Beatles. New York City: Omnibus Press.
- Sheff, David (2000). All We Are Saying: The Last Major Interview with John Lennon and Yoko Ono. New York: St. Martin's Press. ISBN 0-312-25464-4.
