= You're Going to Lose That Girl =

- Cover of 1969 Japanese single release

Song by the Beatles

from the album Help!
- Released: 6 August 1965 (UK); 13 August 1965 (US)
- Recorded: 19 February, 30 March 1965
- Studio: EMI, London
- Genre: Rock
- Length: 2:20
- Label: Parlophone, Capitol, EMI
- Songwriter: Lennon–McCartney
- Producer: George Martin

"You're Going to Lose That Girl" (Note: "You're Gonna Lose That Girl" on Capitol's North American release of Help!) is a song by the English rock band the Beatles from their 1965 album Help! and the film of the same name. Credited to the Lennon–McCartney song-writing partnership, it was mostly written by John Lennon with contributions from Paul McCartney.

== Composition and recording ==
Walter Everett and Ian MacDonald both refer to the song as Lennon's. In his official biography Paul McCartney: Many Years from Now, Paul McCartney estimates the writing as 60–40 to John Lennon. The song was likely written in January or February 1965.

In a 16 January 1965 interview with Ray Coleman for Melody Maker magazine, Lennon explained he had only written "half a song" for the Beatles' next film. From 25 January to 7 February, Lennon and his wife Cynthia vacationed in the Austrian Alps with Beatles producer George Martin and Martin's future wife, Judy Lockhart-Smith. The time off from touring provided Lennon, McCartney and George Harrison time to write new songs, eventually recording 11 new tracks between 15 and 20 February.

The Beatles recorded two takes and overdubs of "You're Going to Lose That Girl" during an afternoon session at EMI on 19 February 1965. The next day Martin, assisted by engineers Norman Smith and Ken Scott, mixed the song for mono. On 23 February, while the Beatles filmed scenes for Help! in the Bahamas, engineers Smith and Malcolm Davies mixed the song for stereo twice, preferring the second mix over the first. On 30 March, the Beatles recorded more overdubs onto the song. An electric piano, and Harrison's original guitar solo, were erased from the original tape. (Note: An acetate of the version with the electric piano and original guitar solo circulates as a bootleg.)

Everett describes the original guitar solo as "tortured" due to the heavy string gauge on Harrison's brand new Fender Stratocaster. Harrison recorded a new guitar solo, Ringo Starr played bongos and McCartney played piano which ended up being unintentionally sharper than the electric guitars. On 2 April Martin, assisted by Smith, made another stereo mix of the song using the 30 March overdubs. This stereo mix was included on both the UK and US stereo releases of Help!

== In the film Help! ==
In the film, the group appears singing the song in the recording studio. In addition to the group's familiar guitar-and-drum setup, there is footage of Paul McCartney at a piano and Ringo Starr playing the bongos, both miming instruments they had overdubbed onto the recording. Towards the end of the song, a thug uses a chainsaw to cut a hole in the floor around the drum kit. The producer reports that they will have to re-record the song due to a buzzing noise, at which point the Beatles begin asking one another who was buzzing. As they look to Ringo, he and the drums fall through the floor.

== Release ==
Help! was released by EMI's Parlophone label on 6 August 1965, with "You're Going to Lose That Girl" as the sixth track, between "Another Girl" and "Ticket to Ride". Capitol released the soundtrack album in North America with an altered track listing as Help! on 13 August. The track, alternatively titled "You're Gonna Lose That Girl", is eleventh and is sequenced between two orchestral pieces. The track includes the first use of Harrison's Sonic Blue Fender Stratocaster, he and Lennon each having been gifted one during the Beatles' 1965 US tour. The guitar remained one of Harrison's favorites and featured heavily on the Beatles next album, Rubber Soul.

Writer Jacqueline Warwick describes the track as an "advice" song, comparable to "She Loves You" and the Beatles' earlier covers of girl groups. Everett describes McCartney and Harrison's responsorial backing vocals as being heavily influenced by Motown music. Warwick imagines Motown based choreography for the song: "it's easy to picture Paul and George shimmying and wagging their fingers if only they hadn't instruments to contend with." In his musicological analysis of the song's chord progressions, Everett describes the changes as "jarringly original". MacDonald describes the track as one of the few recorded during the Help! sessions that stands up, singling out the vocals in particular.

The music journalist Bill Wyman interprets the Ramones' song "You're Gonna Kill That Girl" as a parody of the song.

== Personnel ==
According to Ian MacDonald, except where noted:

- John Lennon – double-tracked lead vocal, rhythm guitar
- Paul McCartney – backing vocal, bass guitar, piano
- George Harrison – backing vocal, lead guitar
- Ringo Starr – drums, bongos

== Sources ==
- Everett, Walter (2001). The Beatles As Musicians: The Quarry Men through Rubber Soul. Oxford and New York: Oxford University Press. ISBN 978-0-19-514105-4.
- Lewisohn, Mark (1988). The Complete Beatles Recording Sessions. New York: Harmony. ISBN 978-0-517-57066-1.
- Lewisohn, Mark (2000) [1992]. The Complete Beatles Chronicle: The Only Definitive Guide To the Beatles' Entire Career. London: Hamlyn. ISBN 978-0-60060-033-6.
- MacDonald, Ian (2007). Revolution in the Head: The Beatles' Records and the Sixties (3rd ed.). Chicago Review Press. ISBN 978-1-55652-733-3.
- Miles, Barry (1997). Paul McCartney: Many Years from Now. Secker & Warburg. ISBN 978-0436280221.
- Miles, Barry (2007) [1998]. The Beatles: A Diary – An Intimate Day by Day History. London: Omnibus. ISBN 978-1-847720-825.
- Sawyers, June Skinner (2006). "Discography". In Sawyers, June Skinner (ed.). Read the Beatles: Classic and New Writings on the Beatles, Their Legacy, and Why They Still Matter. London: Penguin Books. pp. 337–352. ISBN 0-14-303732-3.
- Warwick, Jacqueline (2001). "You're going to lose that girl: The Beatles and the girl groups". Collected Work: Beatlestudies. III: Proceedings of the Beatles 2000 Conference. Jyväskylä: University of Jyväskylä. pp. 161–167. ISBN 978-9513908096.
- Winn, John C. (2008). The Beatles' Recorded Legacy: Volume 1. University of Michigan: Three Rivers Press. ISBN 978-0307451576.
