= Recording the Beatles =

2006 book by Kevin Ryan and Brian Kehew

Recording The Beatles
- First edition
- Author: Kevin Ryan and Brian Kehew
- Language: English
- Genre: Non-fiction
- Publisher: Curvebender Publishing
- Publication date: 2006
- Media type: Print (Hardback)
- Pages: 540
- ISBN: 0-9785200-0-9

Recording the Beatles: The Studio Equipment and Techniques Used to Create Their Classic Albums is a book by Kevin Ryan and Brian Kehew, published by Curvebender Publishing in September 2006. Written over the course of a decade, the book addresses the technical side of the Beatles' sessions and was written with the assistance of many of the group's former engineers and technicians, chief among them Peter K. Burkowitz, designer of the EMI REDD mixing console.

The book examines every piece of recording equipment used at Abbey Road Studios during the Beatles' sessions, including all microphones, outboard gear, mixing consoles, speakers, and tape machines. Each piece is examined in great detail, and the book is illustrated with hundreds of full color photographs, charts, drawings and illustrations. How the equipment was implemented during the group's sessions is also covered. The effects used on the Beatles' records are addressed in great detail, with full explanations of concepts such as ADT and flanging. The "Production" section of the book looks at the group's recording processes chronologically, starting with their "artist test" in 1962 and progressing through to their final session in 1970. The book contains several rare and unseen photos of the Beatles in the studio. The studio personnel and the studio itself is examined.

== Release and reception ==
The book has been critically praised by Beatles biographer Mark Lewisohn (who also contributed the book's Foreword), The New York Times, Mojo magazine (which gave it 5 stars), Beatles engineers Norman Smith, Ken Scott, and Alan Parsons, musician and John Lennon's widow Yoko Ono, and many other individuals directly involved with the Beatles' work. The release of the book was celebrated in November 2006 with a party in Studio Two at Abbey Road. In attendance were most of the Beatles' former engineers and technicians.

The soul singer Raphael Saadiq and his engineer Charles Brungardt studied Recording the Beatles in preparation for recording Saadiq's retro-minded album The Way I See It (2008).
