= You Like Me Too Much =

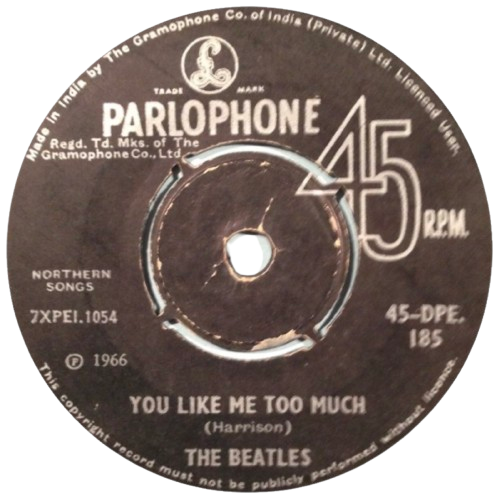
- Label of Indian 7-inch single

Song by the Beatles

from the album Help!
- Released: 14 June 1965 (US: Beatles VI); 6 August 1965 (UK: Help!)
- Recorded: 17 February 1965
- Studio: EMI, London
- Genre: Pop rock
- Length: 2:35
- Label: Parlophone
- Songwriter: George Harrison
- Producer: George Martin

"You Like Me Too Much" is a song by the English rock band the Beatles. It was written by George Harrison, the group's lead guitarist, and released in August 1965 on the Help! album, except in North America, where it appeared on Beatles VI. The band recorded the track on 17 February that year at EMI Studios in London.

== Musical characteristics ==
The song is in the key of G major and in 4/4 time. There is an introduction using piano and electric piano, with Paul McCartney and George Martin playing two different piano parts on separate ends of the same Steinway grand piano. The Steinway appears only in the song's intro and was overdubbed separately, as were McCartney's bass and Harrison's vocal overdubs.

The electric piano is a Hohner Pianet, played by John Lennon. The sound of the instrument's tremolo being switched off after the introduction can be heard.

The quick transition from G chord to a ♭III (B♭) during the introduction is unusual, especially as its F♮ note is melodically sustained against the following D-major chord (with its concomitant F♯), creating what musicologist Alan Pollack terms "the most bluesy moment of the entire song". The verse opens with three repetitions of a simple four-note motif ("Though you've gone away this morning, you'll be back again tonight") during which the chords mirror the lyrics in shifting from ii (Am chord) on "gone away" to IV (C chord) on "back again" to the tonic (G chord) on "tonight".

== Cover versions ==
The band Glycerine covered "You Like Me Too Much" on the album Harrisongs Volume 2 – A Tribute to George Harrison.

== Personnel ==
According to Ian MacDonald, except where noted:

The Beatles

- George Harrison – double-tracked vocal, lead guitar, tambourine
- John Lennon – acoustic rhythm guitar, electric piano
- Paul McCartney – backing vocal, bass, piano
- Ringo Starr – drums

Additional musician

- George Martin – piano
