= Help! (film) =

1965 musical comedy-adventure film starring the Beatles

- US Theatrical release poster
- Directed by: Richard Lester
- Screenplay by: Marc Behm; Charles Wood
- Story by: Marc Behm
- Produced by: Walter Shenson
- Starring: The Beatles; Leo McKern; Eleanor Bron; Victor Spinetti; Roy Kinnear
- Cinematography: David Watkin
- Edited by: John Victor-Smith
- Music by: Musical Director: Ken Thorne; Songs: Lennon-McCartney; George Harrison
- Production companies: Walter Shenson Films; Subafilms
- Distributed by: United Artists
- Release dates: 29 July 1965 (UK); 11 August 1965 (US)
- Running time: 92 minutes
- Country: United Kingdom
- Language: English
- Budget: $1.5 million
- Box office: $12.1 million

Help! is a 1965 British musical comedy-adventure film directed by Richard Lester, starring the Beatles and featuring Leo McKern, Eleanor Bron, Victor Spinetti, John Bluthal, Roy Kinnear and Patrick Cargill. The second film starring the Beatles, following Lester's A Hard Day's Night (1964), Help! sees the group struggle to protect Ringo Starr from a sinister eastern cult and a pair of mad scientists, all of whom are obsessed with obtaining a sacrificial ring sent to him by a fan. The soundtrack was released as the band's fifth studio album under the same name.

Help! had its Royal World Premiere at the London Pavilion Theatre in the West End of London on 29 July 1965 in the presence of Princess Margaret, Countess of Snowdon and the Earl of Snowdon. While not reviewed at the time with the same high level of admiration as their first film, Help! is now credited with influencing the development of music videos.

== Plot ==
An eastern cult (a parody of the Thuggee cult) is about to sacrifice a woman to their goddess, Kaili. They notice that she is not wearing the sacrificial ring. Instead, Ringo Starr, drummer of the Beatles, has the ring, sent to him by the intended victim, who is a fan of the band. Determined to retrieve the ring and sacrifice the girl, the chief priest, Clang, several cult members, and high priestess Ahme leave for London. After failed attempts to steal the ring without Ringo noticing, they confront him in an Indian restaurant. Ringo learns that he will be the next sacrifice if he does not give up the ring. However, the ring is stuck on his finger and he can't take it off.

The Beatles are chased around London by members of the cult. After a jeweler fails to cut the ring off, the band resorts to the bumbling efforts of Foot, a mad scientist and his assistant Algernon; when his equipment has no effect on the ring, Foot decides that he must somehow acquire it. Ahme comes to the Beatles' rescue and tries to shrink Ringo's finger to get the ring off with a temporary shrinking solution, but the cult and the scientists ambush the band's home, causing Ahme to drop the syringe in Paul, temporarily shrinking him instead.

Once Paul returns to his normal size, the band runs to the Austrian Alps and narrowly escapes a trap there, thanks to Ahme, who is secretly aiding them. To stay safe, they ask for protection from Scotland Yard, and a superintendent who is rather disdainful of their fame realizes their danger when the cult continues their efforts to paint Ringo red for the sacrifice by shooting paint-filled balloons into his office. He hides them in Buckingham Palace, where they narrowly avoid capture by the scientists. Later at a pub, Clang sets a trap for Ringo involving a trap door and a tiger. He is saved by the Superintendent recognizing that the tiger is a well-known escapee who can be calmed and captured by singing the "Ode to Joy" from Beethoven's Ninth Symphony; he starts doing so, and gradually the whole of London joins in.

The Beatles then flee to the Bahamas, followed by the scientists, and the cult members. After Ringo is nearly captured, the local police have the other Beatles pose as him in order to ensnare the cult members. Despite their best efforts, however, the scientists catch Ringo and hide him aboard a boat where Foot intends to cut off Ringo's finger to get the ring. Ahme rescues Ringo by giving the scientists the shrinking solution in exchange. The two dive into the ocean to escape, but Ringo cannot swim, and they are both captured by the cult.

At the beach, Ringo is tied down and prepared for sacrifice, while Clang begins the ritual. When the other Beatles arrive, Ringo starts warning them of Clang's trap, just before he notices the ring has fallen off at last. He puts the ring on Clang's finger, and a comic fight ensues between the cult, the Beatles, the police and the scientists. Amidst the brawl, the ring gets tossed around from victim to victim until it finally ends up on Clang's right hand man Bhuta.

== Cast ==
- John Lennon as a fictionalised version of himself
- Paul McCartney as a fictionalised version of himself
- George Harrison as a fictionalised version of himself
- Ringo Starr as a fictionalised version of himself
- Eleanor Bron as Ahme
- Leo McKern as Clang
- John Bluthal as Bhuta
- Patrick Cargill as the Superintendent
- Victor Spinetti as Foot
- Roy Kinnear as Algernon
- Alfie Bass as Doorman
- Warren Mitchell as Abdul
- Peter Copley as Jeweller
- Bruce Lacey as Lawnmower
- Durra as Belly Dancer
- Mal Evans as Channel Swimmer (uncredited)
- Gretchen Franklin as Neighbour (uncredited)
- Dandy Nichols as Neighbour (uncredited)
- Jeremy Lloyd as Restaurant Patron (uncredited)
- John Louis Mansi as Priest/Thug
- Viviane Ventura as Girl on the sacrificial altar (uncredited)

== Production ==
According to interviews conducted with Paul McCartney, George Harrison and Ringo Starr for The Beatles Anthology, director Richard Lester was given a larger budget for this film than he had for A Hard Day's Night, thanks to the commercial success of the latter. Thus, this feature film was in colour and was shot on several overseas locations. It was also given a more extensive musical score than A Hard Day's Night, provided by a full orchestra, and included excerpts of well known classical music: Wagner's Lohengrin, Act III prelude, Tchaikovsky's 1812 Overture, the "Ode to Joy" from Beethoven's Ninth Symphony and, during the end credits and with the Beatles' own comic vocalisations, Rossini's Barber of Seville overture, as well as orchestral arrangements of Beatles songs, among them "A Hard Day's Night" and "She's a Woman." The original title for the film – only changed to Help! very near to its release – was Eight Arms to Hold You. As such, Capitol Records' original pressings of the "Ticket to Ride" single have the subheading: From the United Artists release "Eight Arms to Hold You."

Help! was shot in London, Salisbury Plain, the Austrian Alps, New Providence Island and Paradise Island in the Bahamas, and Twickenham Film Studios. Shooting commenced in the Bahamas on 23 February 1965. Starr commented in The Beatles Anthology that they were in the Bahamas to film the hot weather scenes, and therefore had to wear light clothing even though it was winter and the weather at the time was actually cool. Tony Bramwell, the assistant to Beatles manager Brian Epstein, stated in his book A Magical Mystery Tour that Epstein chose the Bahamas for tax reasons. According to The Beatles Anthology, during the restaurant sequence filmed in early April, Harrison began to discover Indian-style music, which would be a key element in future songs such as "Norwegian Wood". Filming finished on 14 April at Ailsa Avenue in Twickenham.

The ski scenes were shot at Obertauern, a small village in Austria. One reason this location was chosen was that the stars of the film were less likely to be recognised there than at one of the larger resorts with many British tourists. The Beatles were in Obertauern for about two weeks in March 1965 along with a film crew of around 60 people. Locals served as ski stunt doubles for the Beatles, who stayed at the hotel "Edelweiss". Most of the crew were based in the hotel Marieta, where one night the Beatles gave an impromptu concert on the occasion of a director's assistant's birthday. This was the only time they ever performed in Austria.

The Beatles did not particularly enjoy filming Help!, nor were they pleased with the end product. In 1970, John Lennon said they felt like extras in their own film:

The film was out of our control. With A Hard Day's Night, we had a lot of input, and it was semi-realistic. But with Help!, Dick Lester didn't tell us what it was all about.

Ten years later Lennon was more charitable:

I realize, looking back, how advanced it was. It was a precursor to the Batman "Pow! Wow!" on TV – that kind of stuff. But [Lester] never explained it to us. Partly, maybe, because we hadn't spent a lot of time together between A Hard Day's Night and Help!, and partly because we were smoking marijuana for breakfast during that period. Nobody could communicate with us, it was all glazed eyes and giggling all the time. In our own world. It's like doing nothing most of the time, but still having to rise at 7 am, so we became bored.

A contributing factor was exhaustion attributable to their busy schedule of writing, recording and touring. Afterwards they were hesitant to begin another film project, and Help! was their last full-length scripted theatrical film. The Beatles saw the 1968 animated film Yellow Submarine (in which their characters were voiced by actors, and they themselves made only a token appearance) as a favourable way to complete their commitment to United Artists for a third film. Many fans have assumed that the cartoon did not satisfy the contract, but their cameo appearance at the end was included so as to satisfy the terms of the contract requiring their personal appearances in three films. The Beatles' next film Let It Be (1970) was not connected to the original three-picture deal.

=== Inspiration ===
The Beatles said the film was inspired by the classic Marx Brothers film Duck Soup; it was also directly satirical of the James Bond series of films. At the time of the original release of Help!, its distributor, United Artists, also held the rights to the Bond series.

The humour of the film is strongly influenced by the abstract humour of The Goon Show, in which the director had personal and direct experience in the conversion of the radio format to television, and personal working experience with Peter Sellers in particular. Beatles recording producer George Martin had also produced records for the Goon Show team. McCartney has always said that the Beatles' style of humour was taken from the Goon Show. Many of the film's concepts are derived from Goon Shows, such as the presence of wild animals, music, fourth wall-breaking jokes and abstractions such as the closing statement that concludes the film.

=== Working title ===
Among the original working titles for the film were Beatles Phase II and Beatles Two, before Starr suggested Eight Arms to Hold You, which was announced as the official title in mid-March 1965. The latter title was printed on the cover artwork of the single "Ticket to Ride" as from the upcoming film. Because of this, the phrase has been used as a title for an album by Veruca Salt, and for songs by Goon Squad for the Goonies movie, and by the Brittles, a Beatles-pastiche band.

By mid-April 1965, the press was already announcing the film would be retitled. In an interview, Starr said "We wanted to use Stop the World, We Want to Get On, but I believe that Brando's doing that," though it may have been said in sarcasm. Producer Walter Shenson also suggested the title The Day the Clowns Collapsed. Help! was settled on as the film's title later in April, after neither Lennon nor McCartney were able to compose a good title song from its previous name. Lennon then wrote the song "Help!" that same night. The official title was announced on 14 April. Aside from Eight Arms to Hold You, this title won over suggestions from Harrison (Who's Been Sleeping in My Porridge) and United Artists producer Walter Shenson (The Day the Clowns Collapsed). The Beatles had also suggested High-Heeled Knickers, a play on the title of Tommy Tucker's 1964 hit song "High-Heeled Sneakers".

=== Michael Peto photographs ===
The photographer Michael Peto was commissioned in 1965 to take still photographs during the making of the film; these became known for their candid and expressive quality. During the digitisation of the Michael Peto Collection, which was held by Archive Services, University of Dundee, in 2002, 500 previously unpublished photographs of the Beatles taken during the making of Help! were reported to have been uncovered. Now These Days are Gone, a limited edition volume of Peto's photographs focusing on the Beatles images was produced in 2006 with deluxe editions of the book signed by Richard Lester. An exhibition of the photographs to mark the book's launch was held at Hoopers Gallery, Clerkenwell, in January 2006. Another exhibition of the photographs was held at the University of Dundee in 2007 as part of the university's 40th anniversary celebrations, with the exhibition then moving to the National Conservation Centre, Liverpool. In 2011, the photographs were exhibited in Dundee, as part of the Scottish Beatles Weekend, and at the Proud Gallery in Camden.

== Songs ==
The songs played during the film are:

- "Help!"
- "You're Going to Lose That Girl"
- "You've Got to Hide Your Love Away"
- "Ticket to Ride"
- "I Need You"
- "The Night Before" (interspersed with excerpts of "She's a Woman", with an explosion at the end not heard on the Beatles' commercial recordings. Also played as an instrumental)
- "Another Girl"
- "Please Please Me" (different arrangement heard when Paul McCartney rises through the floor, playing an electric organ during the first house scene)
- "She's a Woman" (heard in the background, on a tape machine, and underground in the Salisbury Plain scene)
- "A Hard Day's Night" titled on the US soundtrack album as "Another Hard Day's Night" (played by Indian musicians and as an instrumental medley comprising "A Hard Day's Night", "Can't Buy Me Love" and "I Should Have Known Better")
- "I'm Happy Just to Dance with You" (played by a band during the bike-riding scene)
- "You Can't Do That" (played as an instrumental during the Austrian Alps sequence)
- "From Me to You" titled on the US soundtrack album as "From Me to You Fantasy" (played as an instrumental during scenes of attempts to remove the ring from Ringo's finger while he sleeps in the Beatles' communal house)

The seven main songs formed the first side of the British release of the Help! album. The second side consisted of other new Beatles songs recorded at the same time or shortly afterwards. The US album, released by Capitol Records, includes the seven film tracks along with instrumental soundtrack songs orchestrated by Ken Thorne. In addition, the US Help! opens with a hidden track stylised as a satirical "James Bond Theme" before the title track. Early pressings of the US version of the album 1962–1966 include this hidden track banded as "Help!", and later pressings, when the UK catalogue was made the official and only catalogue of Beatles albums, omit it. The end credits are played over Rossini's "The Barber of Seville".

== Critical response ==
=== Contemporary reviews ===
Upon its release, reviews for Help! were mixed. The Daily Express's reviewer found Lester's direction "a joy to watch" and called the Beatles "the closest thing to the Marx Brothers since the Marx Brothers". By contrast, the Daily Mirror, Britain's best-selling newspaper at the time, said Help! relied too heavily on "the likeable vacant grin of John Lennon, the smooth charm of Paul, the long-haired good looks of George, and the darkly villainous looks of the Long-Nosed One [Ringo Starr]", and that these qualities were insufficient to carry a film. In his contemporary review in The New York Times, film critic Bosley Crowther stated: "It's a fiasco of farcical whimseys that are thrown together in this film – a clutter of mechanical gimmicks and madcap chases ... Funny? Exciting? Different? Well, there's nothing in Help! to compare with that wild ballet of the Beatles racing across a playground in A Hard Day's Night, nothing as wistful as the ramble of Ringo around London all alone ... The boys themselves are exuberant and uninhibited in their own genial way. They just become awfully redundant and – dare I say it? – dull."

=== Retrospective assessments and influence ===
On review aggregator website Rotten Tomatoes, Help! holds an approval rating of 86% based on 28 reviews, with an average rating of 7.2/10. The website's critics consensus reads: "Help! finds the Fab Four displaying their infectious charm and humor in an enjoyably madcap adventure." On Metacritic, it has a weighted average score of 58 out of 100, based on eight critics, indicating "mixed or average reviews".

In a retrospective review, Leslie Halliwell describes the film as an "exhausting attempt to outdo A Hard Day's Night in lunatic frenzy, which goes to show that some talents work best on low budgets. The humour is a frantic cross between Hellzapoppin', The Goons, Goofy, Mr. Magoo and the shade of Monty Python to come. It looks good but becomes too tiresome to entertain."

Help!'s pop art style influenced the 1966–68 Batman TV series and the direction of the contemporary advertising industry. Although Lester's depiction of Indian culture was largely negative and stereotypical, the film's focus on Kali and other Hindu themes anticipated the counterculture's fascination with Indian philosophy and music. In his book 1965: The Year Modern Britain Was Born, cultural commentator Christopher Bray views Help! as "one of the central surrealist texts" of the 1960s, and the film that best captures the "magical weirdness" of London before the commercialisation that accompanied its international recognition as the world's "Swinging City".

Ronnie D. Lankford of AllMovie describes Help! as a "forerunner to music videos", adding: "Lester seemed to find the right tone for Help!, creating an enjoyable portrait of the Beatles and never allowing the film to take itself too seriously. His style would later be co-opted by Bob Rafelson for the Monkees' television series in the '60s and has continued to influence rock musicals like 1998's Spice World". Tony Sokol, writing for Den of Geek in 2017, praised the film's use of in-jokes, the music, and Leo McKern's comedic performance, and noted the film's influence on director Spike Lee, Bob Rafelson and The Monkees TV series, and MTV music videos.

=== Depiction of Eastern cult ===
Help's depiction of the cult of Kaili worshippers has been characterised as racist. Sokol wrote that the film "is aging well, though the basic premise of Help! is kind of passive aggressively racist. The Beatles are trying to save Ringo from a stereotype of a Thuggee cult from the mystic east, east of Suez, which wants to sacrifice the beatkeeper to the baleful goddess Kaili to the tune of inaccessible incantations. Latin, the producers understand, but not this Eastern stuff." Randall Colburn of Consequence described the depiction of the cult as "racist and cartoony", and opined that "Their garish, out-sized presence threatens to eclipse the dry wit that made the Beatles so appealing in A Hard Day's Night. But they also give the film a foot in absurdist comedy, creating an atmosphere that feels unstable and spontaneous. Their silliness also makes them a natural fit for the film's myriad musical numbers." Author Stephen Glynn draws a connection between the film's racial elements and its satirisation of the James Bond films, the latter of which academic Tony Bennett suggests contain racial undertones in their depiction of British imperialist ideology.

== Novelisation ==
A novelisation entitled The Beatles in Help! was written by Al Hine and published by Dell in 1965.

A sequence featuring Frankie Howerd and Wendy Richard was filmed but left out of final editing owing to its length. However, the sequence was left in the film novelisation.

== Release history ==
Like A Hard Day's Night, Help! was originally distributed theatrically by United Artists – the company handled distribution from 1965 to the end of 1980. In January 1981, rights to the film reverted from UA to producer Walter Shenson, and the film was withdrawn from circulation.

Help! was released several times in different video formats by MPI Home Video and The Criterion Collection. A version was released in February 1987 in VHS and Beta through MPI, along with a reissue of A Hard Day's Night the very same day, and was followed by a special-edition release on 31 October 1995. MPI also issued a CLV laserdisc in 1995 and two releases on DVD, the first as a single DVD release on 12 November 1997 and the second as part of The Beatles DVD Collector's Set on 8 August 2000.

LaserDisc releases include a Criterion CAV laserdisc and a Voyager CLV laserdisc in 1987, each of which had three pressings. The first pressings had no UPC on the gatefold covers while the other two had the UPC either as a sticker or printed directly on the jacket.

The film's transfer on the CAV laserdiscs was done correctly so that no blending of frames occurs and thus movements are not blurry. The supplemental section, which, with few exceptions, has never been available on any other home video release, contains the following:

- original theatrical trailer (which includes deleted scenes)
- silent home film footage of the film set and of the world premiere
- still photos, some of which are introduced by text describing the production history of the film
- posters
- sheet music
- record jackets
- radio ads (on audio during the silent footage)
- an open interview, originally designed for disc jockeys. By reading prompts on the screen, one can pretend to talk to the Beatles.

In June 2007, a version of Help!, sub-titled in Korean, became available on Amazon.com. However, by July 2007, all home video versions of the film were pulled from the market because of rights issues involving Apple Corps – now the full rights holders to the film. The rights issues were eventually resolved and Apple Corps/EMI/Capitol released a new double DVD version with a fully restored image and newly remixed in 2.0 stereo and 5.1 surround sound of the film. This came in standard 2xDVD packaging and 2xDVD deluxe edition box set on 30 October 2007 in the UK and 6 November 2007 in America. This latest release contains new featurettes, three trailers (one of which is in Spanish), and the aforementioned radio ads carried over from the Criterion LaserDisc issue. The film was released on Blu-ray format in June 2013 by Universal Music, now the owners of EMI/Capitol Records, using the 2007 restoration.

== Certifications ==
Region	Certification	Certified units/sales
Australia (ARIA)	Gold	7,500^{^}
Canada (Music Canada)	8× Platinum	80,000^{^}
United States (RIAA)	5× Platinum	500,000^{^}
^{^} Shipments figures based on certification alone.
