= Ticket to Ride (song) =

1965 single by the Beatles

- US picture sleeve

Single by the Beatles

from the album Help!
- B-side: "Yes It Is"
- Released: 9 April 1965
- Recorded: 15 February 1965
- Studio: EMI, London
- Genre: Power pop; jangle pop; folk rock
- Length: 3:10
- Label: Parlophone (UK), Capitol (US)
- Songwriter: Lennon–McCartney
- Producer: George Martin

The Beatles UK singles chronology
"I Feel Fine" (1964)	"Ticket to Ride" (1965)	"Help!" (1965)

The Beatles US singles chronology
"Eight Days a Week" (1965)	"Ticket to Ride" (1965)	"Help!" (1965)

Promotional film
- "Ticket to Ride" on YouTube

"Ticket to Ride" is a song by the English rock band the Beatles, written primarily by John Lennon and credited to Lennon–McCartney. Issued as a single in April 1965, it became the Beatles' seventh consecutive number 1 hit in the United Kingdom and their third consecutive number 1 hit (and eighth in total) in the United States, and similarly topped national charts in Canada, Australia and Ireland. The song was included on their 1965 album Help!. Recorded at EMI Studios in London in February that year, the track marked a progression in the Beatles' work through the incorporation of drone and harder-sounding instrumentation relative to their previous releases. Among music critics, Ian MacDonald describes the song as "psychologically deeper than anything the Beatles had recorded before" and "extraordinary for its time".

"Ticket to Ride" appears in a sequence in the Beatles' second feature film, Help!, directed by Richard Lester. Live performances by the band were included in the Beatles at Shea Stadium concert film, on the live album documenting their concerts at the Hollywood Bowl, and on the 1996 Anthology 2 box set. In 1969, "Ticket to Ride" was covered by the Carpenters, whose version peaked at number 54 on the Billboard Hot 100.

== Composition ==
"Ticket to Ride" sample

"Ticket to Ride" was primarily written by John Lennon, and credited to Lennon–McCartney. In 1965, Lennon claimed that the song was "three-quarters mine and Paul [McCartney] changed it a bit. He said let's alter the tune." However, speaking in 1980, Lennon said that McCartney's contribution was limited to "the way Ringo [Starr] played the drums" on the recording. In his 1997 authorised biography, Paul McCartney contradicts this, providing an account more similar to Lennon's 1965 assessment: "we sat down and wrote it together … give him 60 percent of it … we sat down together and worked on that for a full three-hour songwriting session."

The song is written in the key of A major. The structure of the composition is in an expanded variation of the AABA pop song format, with eight bars of verse and eight bars of chorus forming the A section, and a nine-bar primary bridge forming the B section. The sustained A chord over the verses creates an implied drone common in Indian music and supports a melody that author Ian MacDonald terms "raga-like".

The song's coda features a change of tempo. In the view of musicologist Walter Everett, the latter section marks a progression on previous Beatles songs that similarly revisit aspects of a composition when ending with a coda. In the case of "Ticket to Ride", the section consists of a repeated refrain similar to the last line of the chorus ("My baby don't care"), played over a constant A major chord and set to the double-time rhythm used in the bridge. Lennon said this closing section was one of his "favourite bits" in the song. He also claimed that "Ticket to Ride" was the first heavy metal record ever made. According to MacDonald, the track's heavy sound may have been influenced by Lennon and George Harrison's first encounter with LSD, the precise date of which varies among Beatles biographers. Author Simon Philo calls the song "avant-garde masquerading as pop".

While the lyrics describe a girl "riding out of the life of the narrator", the inspiration of the title phrase is unclear, as is the meaning of the song. McCartney said the title referred to "a British Railways ticket to the town of Ryde on the Isle of Wight", but Lennon said it referred to cards carried by Hamburg prostitutes in the 1960s indicating that they had a clean bill of health. The Beatles played in Hamburg early in their musical career, and "ride" was British slang for having sex. Gaby Whitehill and Andrew Trendall of Gigwise have interpreted the song to be about a woman leaving her boyfriend to become a prostitute.

== Recording ==
It was [a] slightly new sound at the time, because it was pretty fuckin' heavy for then. If you go and look in the charts for what other music people were making, and you hear it now, it doesn't sound too bad. It's all happening, it's a heavy record.

— John Lennon, 1970

The Beatles recorded "Ticket to Ride" on 15 February 1965 at EMI Studios in London. It was the band's first recording session since completing the Beatles for Sale album on 26 October 1964, after which they had toured the UK and played a season of Christmas shows in London until mid-January. The session inaugurated what author Mark Lewisohn describes as "a more serious application in the recording studio" by the group, which included taping rehearsals of each song they worked on and concentrating on backing or rhythm tracks, after which they would overdub more detailed instrumental parts. Everett views the recording as a radical departure for the Beatles, due to the vocals and lead guitar parts being overdubbed for the first time.

The song's main guitar riff was played by Harrison on his Rickenbacker 12-string guitar and was among the parts taped with the rhythm track. Author Mark Hertsgaard highlights the idea for this riff and for Starr's "jagged, whack-and-jump" drum pattern as examples of McCartney's increasing importance as the Beatles' musical director. According to Harrison, however, the Rickenbacker riff was his own idea, based on the way Lennon strummed the chord when introducing the song to the band. Harrison also said that the "staggered" motion of the riff then inspired the pattern that Starr decided to play. In addition to Lennon's lead vocal and McCartney's harmony, the overdubs included further electric guitar parts by Lennon and Harrison (on Rickenbacker 325 and Fender Stratocaster, respectively), over the verses, and by McCartney (on Epiphone Casino), who supplied the fills that close the bridges and the solo over the coda.

== Release ==
In March 1965, the Beatles and their manager, Brian Epstein, selected "Ticket to Ride" and "Yes It Is" to be the A- and B-sides, respectively, of the group's first single release of the year. The record was issued by EMI's Parlophone label on 9 April 1965 in the United Kingdom, and by Capitol Records on 19 April in the United States. A contemporary news report stated that the Beatles were due to promote the single on television shows such as Top of the Pops and Thank Your Lucky Stars, and that the band were forming an independent production company with their producer, George Martin, which would earn them a more favourable financial return on their recordings. A portion of the group's Top of the Pops performance of "Ticket to Ride" survived only because it was later used in the Doctor Who episode "The Executioners", which aired on BBC1 on 22 May. The episode was part of the serial The Chase and sees the Doctor using a time–space machine in the future to observe historical figures such as William Shakespeare, Abraham Lincoln and the Beatles. (Note: The BBC typically did not archive past episodes of Top of the Pops during the 1960s, and sometimes wiped the tapes for reuse. The portion of "Ticket to Ride" included in the Doctor Who episode remains the only surviving record of the Beatles' appearance.) In addition to their television promotion, the group performed the song during their last session for BBC Radio, on 26 May, which was broadcast as The Beatles (Invite You to Take a Ticket to Ride).

"Ticket to Ride" topped Britain's official singles chart for three weeks. It went straight in at number 1 on the national listings compiled by Melody Maker, where it also stayed for three weeks, and similarly topped Ireland's singles chart in its first week of release there. In America, the song was number 1 on the Billboard Hot 100 chart for one week. According to Billboard's Hits of the World listings for 15 May 1965, "Ticket to Ride" was also the top-selling single in Australia. The US single's face label stated that the A-side was from the forthcoming United Artists release Eight Arms to Hold You, which was the original title of the Beatles' second film, directed by Richard Lester. The title was changed to Help! after the single's release. In the film, the song plays over a sequence during which the Beatles attempt to ski and frequently fall over. The track appeared on the band's 1965 album Help!, which was issued on 6 August in the UK and on 13 August in the US.

"Ticket to Ride" was the seventh consecutive chart-topping single for the Beatles in the UK and the first Beatles track released with a running time exceeding three minutes. On the American charts, it was the third of six number 1 singles in a row, a record at the time, along with "I Feel Fine", "Eight Days a Week", "Help!", "Yesterday" and "We Can Work It Out" – all achieved in the space of twelve months from January 1965. Everett writes that although the song achieved "classic" status, it was a surprise among Beatles singles in that it failed to achieve gold accreditation from the Recording Industry Association of America. (Note: At the time of the single's release, Harrison said he thought "Ticket to Ride" might not be chart-topping material.) When the song hit number 1 there, the Beatles became the fourth consecutive English group to hold down the top spot, after the Mancunian groups Freddie and the Dreamers, Wayne Fontana and the Mindbenders, and Herman's Hermits. As part of EMI's plan to exploit the 20th anniversary of each Beatles single, "Ticket to Ride" was reissued in the UK in April 1985 and peaked at number 70 on the UK Singles Chart.

== Appearance in Help! and promotional film ==
"Ticket to Ride" features in a scene in the film Help! The Beatles are seen attempting to ski and avoiding a team of assassins from a cult whose quest is to murder Starr. The scene was filmed at Obertauern in the Austrian Alps in March 1965.

Picture taken during the filming of the promotional film

On 23 November 1965, the Beatles filmed promotional clips for "Ticket to Ride" and four other songs, including both sides of their upcoming single at the time, "We Can Work It Out" / "Day Tripper" , at Twickenham Film Studios in south-west London. The films were directed by Joe McGrath, who had worked on Help! as an assistant to Lester. In the case of "Ticket to Ride", the clip was made for inclusion in Top of the Pops' round-up of the biggest hits of 1965.

Against a backdrop of oversized tickets, the Beatles are shown miming to the song, with Starr standing at his drum kit and the other band members sitting in director's chairs. Part of the clip appeared in the 1995 documentary The Beatles Anthology. In 2015, it was included in full on the Beatles' video compilation 1.

== Critical reception ==
"Ticket to Ride" is a watershed single, the moment when the Beatles moved from cuddly mop-tops to strange and interesting sonic explorers. So it's fitting that it carries an enigma at its core [regarding the song's meaning] – the first Rosebud in a catalogue of many.

— Music critic Johnny Black, 2006

In his contemporary review of the single, Derek Johnson of the NME admired the "depth of sound" and "tremendous drive" of the recording. Music critics Richie Unterberger of AllMusic and Ian MacDonald both feel that "Ticket to Ride" is an important milestone in the evolution of the musical style of the Beatles. Unterberger said, "the rhythm parts on 'Ticket to Ride' were harder and heavier than they had been on any previous Beatles outing, particularly in Ringo Starr's stormy stutters and rolls." MacDonald describes it as "psychologically deeper than anything the Beatles had recorded before ... extraordinary for its time – massive with chiming electric guitars, weighty rhythm, and rumbling floor tom-toms", and he views the production as a signal of the band's next major change of musical direction, with "Tomorrow Never Knows" in April 1966. MacDonald also comments that, while the Kinks' "See My Friends" has been identified as the inspiration for the Beatles' use of Indian instrumentation later in 1965, the subtle drone in "Ticket to Ride" could equally have influenced the Kinks when they recorded "See My Friends".

Writing for Mojo in 2002, musician and journalist Bob Stanley said the track was "where moptop Beatlemania ends and [the Beatles]' weightless, ageless legend begins". In his song review for Blender, Johnny Black similarly described it as a "watershed" recording and attributed its relatively poor US sales to the song's "weird soup of hypnotically chiming, droning guitars, stuttering drums and contrasting vocal textures that, in the context of the 1965 charts, was far ahead of its time". Neil McCormick of The Daily Telegraph sees a darker edge to Lennon's lyric writing during the Help! period and he cites "the drone of riffing, proto-heavy-rock song Ticket to Ride" as an example of the band's more sophisticated sound, and of how the album "contains some of their greatest early songs". Writing for Rough Guides, Chris Ingham similarly views the track as "magnificently brooding" and "the most intense music The Beatles had yet recorded". In his review of Help! for BBC Music, David Quantick includes "Ticket to Ride" among the album's "flashes of brilliance" and describes it as "the song that saw The Beatles take on The Kinks, the Stones and The Who at their own, more rocky game".

"Ticket to Ride" has been included in many critics' best-song lists. Dave Marsh ranked it 29th on his 1989 list "The 1001 Greatest Singles Ever Made". The track appeared at number 17 on Rolling Stone's list of the "100 Greatest Beatles Songs" and at number 23 on a similar list compiled by Mojo. In his commentary for Mojo, John Harris said that "Ticket to Ride" was "the sound of a four-piece group hurtling way beyond the beat-pop being churned out by their peers" but also showed the band developing the same sound that the Byrds adopted on their "pivotal" debut single, "Mr. Tambourine Man". In 2009, the staff of PopMatters ranked "Ticket to Ride" at number 10 in their list of the 25 "Classic" Beatles tracks, which they defined as "not necessarily the 'best songs'" by the band, but those "through which (perhaps) we might gain the deepest appreciation for their popular genius". David Gassman said the track was most notable as an early example of the Beatles incorporating Indian sounds, anticipating "Norwegian Wood" and "Within You Without You". He also described the song as "Exhibit A that Ringo Starr is one of the greatest rock 'n' roll drummers of all time" and said it was among the band's best singles. In 2014, USA Today named it the best Beatles song, saying: "No single better reflects the ambition, tension and pure pop genius that made the Beatles unique … Ticket to Ride is perfection all the way through." The music staff of Time Out London ranked it at number 11 on their 2018 list of the best Beatles songs.

== Live performances ==
The Beatles played "Ticket to Ride" throughout their June–July 1965 European tour. A live performance from the 1 August 1965 broadcast of Blackpool Night Out was included on the Anthology 2 compilation and shown during The Beatles Anthology documentary. On 14 August, the group recorded a live performance of the song for The Ed Sullivan Show, broadcast the following month.

"Ticket to Ride" was also included in the set list for the Beatles' 1965 US tour and their UK tour at the end of the year. The 15 August performance at Shea Stadium appears in the 1966 documentary The Beatles at Shea Stadium, although the audio for the song was re-recorded in London prior to release. The group's 29 August performance at the Hollywood Bowl was chosen for the 1977 album The Beatles at the Hollywood Bowl.

== Cover versions ==
=== The Carpenters ===
"Ticket to Ride"

Single by the Carpenters

from the album Offering/Ticket to Ride
- B-side: "Your Wonderful Parade"
- Released: November 5, 1969
- Recorded: 1969
- Genre: Pop rock; soft rock; baroque pop; adult contemporary; ballad
- Length: 4:13
- Label: A&M
- Songwriter: Lennon–McCartney
- Producer: Jack Daugherty

The Carpenters singles chronology
"Looking for Love" (1966)	"Ticket to Ride" (1969)	"(They Long to Be) Close to You" (1970)

In mid-1969, the American pop-music duo the Carpenters covered "Ticket to Ride" for their debut studio album Offering. Richard Carpenter recalled: "I happened to hear [the song] being played as an oldie one day in early 1969, and upon hearing it this particular time, decided the tune would make a nice ballad." As arranged by Richard Carpenter, the song became the plaint of a castoff lover, with the opening line: "I think I'm gonna be sad", being sung repeatedly as the track fades.

The musicians on the recording were Karen Carpenter (lead and backing vocals, drums), Richard Carpenter (backing vocals, piano, Wurlitzer electric piano, orchestration), Joe Osborn (bass guitar), David Duke (French horn), Herb Alpert (shaker) and uncredited contributors on bell tree and tubular bells.

Released as the duo's first single – without the album track's introductory twelve measures – "Ticket to Ride" became the Carpenters' first charting single, peaking at number 54 on the Billboard Hot 100 in May 1970, reaching number 19 on the same magazine's Adult Contemporary chart, and number 24 on the Canadian AC chart in February. The single's success led to its parent album being reissued as Ticket to Ride. The first Carpenters' retrospective, The Singles: 1969–1973, issued in 1973, featured an amended version of "Ticket to Ride" with a new lead vocal by Karen Carpenter. Other amendments were a new drum track by Karen to replace her drumming on the original track, and the addition of guitar work by Carpenters regular sideman Tony Peluso (who had not been attached to the group in 1969).

=== Other artists ===
The song was covered by former Motown artist Mary Wells, a favourite of the Beatles, who had invited her to open their concerts during a 1964 UK tour. Wells' recording appeared on her 1965 album Love Songs to the Beatles. Brian Wilson appropriated part of the melody and vocal intonation from "Ticket to Ride" into the Beach Boys' song "Girl Don't Tell Me". Later that same year, George Martin covered "Ticket to Ride" on his album of orchestral instrumentals titled Help!, producing a version that Billboard's reviewer admired as being "worth the price of the album".

Mezzo-soprano singer Cathy Berberian opened her 1967 album Beatles Arias with a baroque interpretation of "Ticket to Ride" arranged by Luciano Berio. Late the previous year, Berberian had surprised her Carnegie Hall concert audience by performing this and two other well-known Beatles songs – a gesture that musicologist Kate Meehan cites as reflecting the band's elevated status among many classical musicians and composers from mid 1965 onwards.

English singer Alma Cogan, with whom Lennon had an extramarital affair, covered "Ticket to Ride" in the style of Dionne Warwick for her final album, Alma, released a year after her death in 1966. Vanilla Fudge recorded what Paul Collins of AllMusic describes as a "stoned-out, slowed-down" version of the track for their 1967 debut album Vanilla Fudge. The 5th Dimension included "Ticket to Ride" on The Magic Garden, an album that, according to Ken Shane of Popdose, "tells the story of a love affair from its rapturous beginning, through trials and tribulations to its end, and beyond". While Unterberger dismisses it as "a misfired cover", Shane describes the song as "a terrific version" that complements the Jimmy Webb–written song cycle that fills the rest of the album.

"Ticket to Ride" was also covered by the Bee Gees, whose version appeared on their limited-release rarities compilation Inception/Nostalgia (1970), and by the New Seekers, who combined it in a medley with "Georgy Girl" for their 1972 UK album We'd Like to Teach the World to Sing. Punk band Hüsker Dü contributed a cover of "Ticket to Ride" to NME's Big Four, an EP distributed free with the 1 February 1986 issue of NME magazine. Johnny Black paired this version with the Carpenters' hit recording as examples of how the Lennon–McCartney song continues to endure. Echo & the Bunnymen recorded "Ticket to Ride" in 2001, creating a version that Vulture.com later included among its ten best Beatles covers. That same year, Beatallica parodied the song on their A Garage Dayz Nite track "Everybody's Got a Ticket to Ride Except for Me and My Lightning".

In Pink Floyd's eighth studio album, The Dark Side of the Moon, specifically at the end of the closing track "Eclipse," a brief orchestral sample of "Ticket to Ride" can be heard faintly in the background on some releases of the album.

== Personnel ==
According to Ian MacDonald:

- John Lennon – double-tracked lead vocal, rhythm guitar
- Paul McCartney – harmony vocal, bass guitar, lead guitar
- George Harrison – lead guitar (12-string), rhythm guitar
- Ringo Starr – drums, tambourine, handclaps

== Chart performance ==
=== The Beatles version ===
Weekly charts

Chart (1965)	Peak position
Austria (Ö3 Austria Top 40)	8
Belgium (Ultratop 50 Flanders)	10
Canada Top Singles (RPM)	1
Netherlands (Single Top 100)	1
Ireland (IRMA)	1
Norway (VG-lista)	1
Finland (The Official Finnish Charts)	3
Rhodesia (Lyons Maid)	7
South Africa (Springbok)	2
Sweden (Kvällstoppen)	1
Sweden (Tio i Topp)	1
UK Singles (Official Charts)	1
US Billboard Hot 100	1
US Cash Box Top 100 Singles	1
West German Media Control Singles Chart	2

Year-end charts

Chart (1965)	Rank
South Africa	3
US Billboard	31
US Cash Box	36
UK Singles (OCC)	5

=== The Carpenters version ===
Chart (1969)	Peak position
US Billboard Hot 100	54
US Adult Contemporary (Billboard)	19
US Cashbox Radio Active Airplay Singles	10

== Certifications ==
Region	Certification	Certified units/sales
France	—	100,000
New Zealand (RMNZ)	Gold	15,000^{‡}
United Kingdom Original release	—	700,000
United Kingdom (BPI) 2010 release	Silver	200,000^{‡}
United States	—	750,000
^{‡} Sales+streaming figures based on certification alone.

== Sources ==
- Badman, Keith (2001). The Beatles Diary Volume 2: After the Break-Up 1970–2001. London: Omnibus Press. ISBN 978-0-7119-8307-6.
- Castleman, Harry; Podrazik, Walter J. (1976). All Together Now: The First Complete Beatles Discography 1961–1975. New York, NY: Ballantine Books. ISBN 0-345-25680-8.
- Everett, Walter (2001). The Beatles as Musicians: The Quarry Men through Rubber Soul. New York, NY: Oxford University Press. ISBN 0-19-514105-9.
- Everett, Walter (2009). The Foundations of Rock: From "Blue Suede Shoes" to "Suite: Judy Blue Eyes". New York, NY: Oxford University Press. ISBN 978-0-19-531024-5.
- Harry, Bill (2000). The Beatles Encyclopedia: Revised and Updated. London: Virgin Publishing. ISBN 0-7535-0481-2.
- Hertsgaard, Mark (1996). A Day in the Life: The Music and Artistry of the Beatles. London: Pan Books. ISBN 0-330-33891-9.
- Ingham, Chris (2006). The Rough Guide to the Beatles (2nd edn). London: Rough Guides/Penguin. ISBN 978-1-84836-525-4.
- Jackson, Andrew Grant (2015). 1965: The Most Revolutionary Year in Music. New York, NY: Thomas Dunne Books. ISBN 978-1-250-05962-8.
- Lewisohn, Mark (2005) [1988]. The Complete Beatles Recording Sessions: The Official Story of the Abbey Road Years 1962–1970. London: Bounty Books. ISBN 978-0-7537-2545-0.
- MacDonald, Ian (2005). Revolution in the Head: The Beatles' Records and the Sixties (Second Revised ed.). London: Pimlico (Rand). ISBN 1-84413-828-3.
- McKinney, Devin (2003). Magic Circles: The Beatles in Dream and History. Cambridge, MA: Harvard University Press. ISBN 978-0-674-01202-8.
- Meehan, Kate (2014). "Beatles Arias: Cathy Berberian Sings The Beatles". In Karantonis, Pamela; Placanica, Francesca; Sivuoja-Kauppala, Anne; Verstraete, Pieter (eds.). Cathy Berberian: Pioneer of Contemporary Vocality. Farnham, UK: Ashgate Publishing. ISBN 978-1-4094-6983-4.
- Miles, Barry (1997). Paul McCartney: Many Years From Now. New York: Henry Holt and Company. ISBN 0-8050-5249-6.
- Miles, Barry (2001). The Beatles Diary Volume 1: The Beatles Years. London: Omnibus Press. ISBN 0-7119-8308-9.
- Norman, Philip (2008). John Lennon: The Life. New York, NY: Ecco. ISBN 978-0-06-075402-0.
- Philo, Simon (2015). British Invasion: The Crosscurrents of Musical Influence. Lanham, MD: Rowman & Littlefield. ISBN 978-0-8108-8626-1.
- Ribowsky, Mark (2009). The Supremes: A Saga of Motown Dreams, Success, and Betrayal. Cambridge, MA: Da Capo Press. ISBN 978-0-3068-1586-7.
- Rodriguez, Robert (2012). Revolver: How the Beatles Reimagined Rock 'n' Roll. Milwaukee, WI: Backbeat Books. ISBN 978-1-61713-009-0.
- Romanowski, Patricia; George-Warren, Holly, eds. (1995). The New Rolling Stone Encyclopedia of Rock & Roll. New York, NY: Fireside/Rolling Stone Press. ISBN 0-684-81044-1.
- Sheff, David (2000). All We Are Saying: The Last Major Interview with John Lennon and Yoko Ono. New York: St. Martin's Press. ISBN 0-312-25464-4.
- Turner, Steve (2005). A Hard Day's Write: The Stories Behind Every Beatles Song (3rd ed.). New York: Harper Paperbacks. ISBN 0-06-084409-4.
- Wallgren, Mark (1982). The Beatles on Record. New York: Simon & Schuster. ISBN 0-671-45682-2.
- Winn, John C. (2008). Way Beyond Compare: The Beatles' Recorded Legacy, 1957–1965. New York, NY: Three Rivers Press. ISBN 978-0-307-45157-6.
- Womack, Kenneth (2014). The Beatles Encyclopedia: Everything Fab Four. Santa Barbara, CA: ABC-CLIO. ISBN 978-0-313-39171-2.
