= You've Got to Hide Your Love Away =

1965 song by the Beatles

- Sheet music cover

Song by the Beatles

from the album Help!
- Released: 6 August 1965
- Recorded: 18 February 1965
- Studio: EMI, London
- Genre: Folk rock
- Length: 2:11
- Label: Parlophone
- Songwriter: Lennon–McCartney
- Producer: George Martin

Audio sample
- file; help

"You've Got to Hide Your Love Away" is a song by the English rock band the Beatles. It was written and sung by John Lennon (though credited to Lennon–McCartney) and released on the album Help! in August 1965.

== Composition and recording ==
Lennon said of the song, "That's me in my Dylan period again. I am like a chameleon, influenced by whatever is going on. If Elvis can do it, I can do it. If the Everly Brothers can do it, me and Paul can. Same with Dylan." The song is an early example of Lennon self-reflecting in his writing, which had begun with songs such as "I'm a Loser" on the band's 1964 album Beatles for Sale. Lennon wrote the song at home, wanting another song for the film Help!. The song "is just basically John doing Dylan", Paul McCartney confirmed. The song is similar to a folkish strophic form and uses a Dylanesque acoustic guitar figure in compound duple time, normally committed to score in 6/8 or 12/8 time, with chiefly acoustic accompaniment, no backing voices and light percussion from brushed snare, tambourine and maraca. A flute, however, replaces the harmonica that Dylan typically used.

The song's lyrics are ambiguous. Potentially, Lennon could have been referring to the fact that, as a Beatle, he was expected to keep the fact he was married a secret. He could also have been writing about his inability to express his true 'loving' self in public and his feelings of isolation and paranoia related to fame. Some, such as singer Tom Robinson, have suggested that the song was written for the Beatles' manager Brian Epstein, a closeted homosexual. Lennon himself, however, never publicly discussed his inspiration for the lyrics. When the song was first written, Lennon used "two-foot tall" to rhyme with the "wall" in the first verse, but mistakenly said "two-foot small" when he sang the line to McCartney, and decided to keep it this way. Pete Shotton, Lennon's former bandmate from The Quarrymen, was present when the song was being composed, and suggested adding "Hey" to the start of the line in the refrain.

The basic rhythm track was recorded first, followed by George Harrison's overdubbed 12-string guitar and some extra percussion. John Scott recorded a tenor flute in the spaces in Lennon's vocal track and an additional alto flute part, an octave higher than the first, on the last available track of the four-track machine.

== Performance in the film ==
In the film Help!, at the opening of the song, the head of the cult, Clang (Leo McKern), appears from underneath a manhole cover in the middle of Ailsa Avenue, London, where parts of the film were shot. He stays there for the whole song, which the Beatles play in Lennon's quarters of the Beatles' shared flat. The flute part of the song is performed by George's in-house gardener (Bruce Lacey). They are watched by Ahme (Eleanor Bron), and at the end of the song, Harrison passes out after Ahme produces a giant needle for Starr, who is wearing the ring the cult is seeking.

== Personnel ==
According to John C. Winn:

The Beatles

- John Lennon – vocal, acoustic twelve-string guitar
- Paul McCartney – bass guitar, maracas
- George Harrison – Spanish acoustic guitar, twelve-string acoustic guitar
- Ringo Starr – drums (with brushes), tambourine

Additional musician

- John Scott – tenor and alto flutes

== Cover versions ==
The Silkie, a band that had been signed by Brian Epstein, recorded their version a few months after the Beatles. Lennon produced the session, while McCartney contributed guitar and Harrison tambourine. Their version, released in October 1965, peaked at No. 10 on the U.S. Billboard Hot 100 and peaked at No. 28 on the UK Singles Chart.
