= Walter Everett (musicologist) =

Music theorist specializing in popular music

Walter Everett is a music theorist specializing in popular music who teaches at the University of Michigan.

His books include The Beatles as Musicians: Revolver through the Anthology (1999, ISBN 978-0-19-512941-0), which has been called "the most important work to appear on the Beatles thus far", and its follow-up volume, The Beatles as Musicians: The Quarry Men through Rubber Soul (2001). He also wrote The Foundations of Rock: From 'Blue Suede Shoes' to 'Suite: Judy Blue Eyes' (2008, ISBN 978-0-19-531024-5) and has contributed to titles in the Cambridge Companions to Music series.

Gary Burns, editor of the journal Popular Music and Society, describes Everett's Beatles as Musicians volumes as a "monumental two-book set" that has furthered the field of musicological study begun in 1973 by Wilfrid Mellers. According to Michael Frontani, author of The Beatles: Image and the Media, the books represent a "landmark of scholarship" about the band's music.

Everett received the Kjell Meling Award for Distinction in the Arts and Humanities.

== Education ==
- BS, Gettysburg College music education, piano concentration
- MM, University of Cincinnati College-Conservatory of Music music theory
- PhD, University of Michigan, music theory

== Works ==
- Expression in Pop-Rock Music : A Collection of Critical and Analytical Essays (as editor) (1999)
- The Beatles as Musicians: Revolver through the Anthology (1999)
- The Beatles as Musicians: The Quarry Men through Rubber Soul (2001)
- The Foundations of Rock: From "Blue Suede Shoes" to "Suite: Judy Blue Eyes" (2009)
- What Goes On: The Beatles, Their Music, and Their Time (with Tim Riley) (2019)
