= List of songs in The Beatles: Rock Band =

The Beatles: Rock Band is a 2009 music video game developed by Harmonix, published by MTV Games and distributed by Electronic Arts, in association with Apple Corps. It is the third major console release in the Rock Band music video game series and is available on the PlayStation 3, Xbox 360, and Wii consoles. The game allows one to six players to simulate the performance of songs by the Beatles by providing the players with peripherals modelled after musical instruments (a guitar peripheral for lead guitar and bass gameplay, a drum peripheral, and a microphone). The gameplay mechanics of the game are similar to those found in other Rock Band games, in which players use the instrument controllers to match scrolling on-screen notes in time to the music to score points.

The 45-song selection of the Beatles' music on the game's disc was praised by critics, considering the list to be emotional, sentimental and a good cross-section of the band's catalogue. Compared to other music video games released previously, the number of tracks in The Beatles: Rock Band was considered small, and the inclusion of certain lesser-known songs, and the exclusion of more popular ones, was considered confusing. In addition to the on-disc songs, The Beatles: Rock Band featured downloadable content, in the form of both singles and full albums (excluding those songs already on disc), allowing players to play through the album in a single session, once the album has been obtained.

== On-disc track listing ==
The game disc features 45 songs chosen from the 12 original UK albums by the Beatles, the US album Magical Mystery Tour, the 2006 remix album Love and several non-album singles. Though "Sgt. Pepper's Lonely Hearts Club Band" and "With a Little Help From My Friends" are considered to be two songs, they can only be played back-to-back within the game. All songs except "The End" are playable immediately in Quickplay and other multiplayer modes, while in Career mode, players complete through the songs in a loosely historical order; upon completion of the Career mode, "The End", the mode's final song, becomes available for all other game modes. Regardless of game mode, each song is played in a specific venue. Most venues are based on a historical progression of famous Beatles' performances, including their first appearance on American television on The Ed Sullivan Show and their concert at Shea Stadium. For the Abbey Road venue, each song (except "Hey Bulldog") has a unique "Dreamscape"; the songs start with the Beatles in the studio, then dissolve into the imaginative Dreamscape inspired by the song, finally arriving back at the studio at the end of the song.

All songs by Lennon–McCartney except "Here Comes the Sun," "I Me Mine," "If I Needed Someone," "Something," "Taxman," "While My Guitar Gently Weeps" and "Within You Without You" by George Harrison; "Octopus's Garden" by Richard Starkey; "Boys" by Luther Dixon and Wes Farrell; and "Twist and Shout" by Phil Medley and Bert Berns.

The 45 songs included on the game disc are as follows, with the year the song was originally released, the album the song was published on and the game venue at which the song is performed:

| Song | Album | Year | Venue |
|---|---|---|---|
| "A Hard Day's Night" | A Hard Day's Night | 1964 | Ed Sullivan Theater |
| "And Your Bird Can Sing" | Revolver | 1966 | Budokan |
| "Back in the U.S.S.R." | The Beatles^{d} | 1968 | Abbey Road Studios '67–68 |
| "Birthday" | The Beatles^{e} | 1968 | Abbey Road Studios '68–69 |
| "Boys" | Please Please Me | 1963 | Cavern Club |
| "Can't Buy Me Love" | A Hard Day's Night | 1964 | Ed Sullivan Theater |
| "Come Together" | Abbey Road | 1969 | Abbey Road Studios '68–69 |
| "Day Tripper" | Single | 1965 | Budokan |
| "Dear Prudence" | The Beatles^{d} | 1968 | Abbey Road Studios '67–68 |
| "Dig a Pony" | Let It Be | 1970 | Rooftop Concert |
| "Do You Want to Know a Secret" | Please Please Me | 1963 | Cavern Club |
| "Don't Let Me Down" | Single | 1969 | Rooftop Concert |
| "Drive My Car" | Rubber Soul | 1965 | Budokan |
| "Eight Days a Week" | Beatles for Sale | 1964 | Shea Stadium |
| "Get Back" | Let It Be | 1970 | Rooftop Concert |
| "Getting Better" | Sgt. Pepper's Lonely Hearts Club Band | 1967 | Abbey Road Studios '66–67 |
| "Good Morning Good Morning" | Sgt. Pepper's Lonely Hearts Club Band | 1967 | Abbey Road Studios '66–67 |
| "Hello, Goodbye" | Magical Mystery Tour | 1967 | Abbey Road Studios '67–68 |
| "Helter Skelter" | The Beatles^{e} | 1968 | Abbey Road Studios '68–69 |
| "Here Comes the Sun" | Abbey Road | 1969 | Abbey Road Studios '68–69 |
| "Hey Bulldog" | Yellow Submarine | 1969 | Abbey Road Studios '67–68 |
| "I Am the Walrus" | Magical Mystery Tour | 1967 | Abbey Road Studios '67–68 |
| "I Feel Fine" | Single | 1964 | Shea Stadium |
| "I Me Mine" | Let It Be | 1970 | Rooftop Concert |
| "I Saw Her Standing There" | Please Please Me | 1963 | Cavern Club |
| "I Wanna Be Your Man" | With the Beatles | 1963 | Ed Sullivan Theater |
| "I Want to Hold Your Hand" | Single | 1963 | Ed Sullivan Theater |
| "I Want You (She's So Heavy)" | Abbey Road | 1969 | Rooftop Concert |
| "If I Needed Someone" | Rubber Soul | 1965 | Shea Stadium |
| "I'm Looking Through You" | Rubber Soul | 1965 | Shea Stadium |
| "I've Got a Feeling" | Let It Be | 1970 | Rooftop Concert |
| "Lucy in the Sky with Diamonds" | Sgt. Pepper's Lonely Hearts Club Band | 1967 | Abbey Road Studios '66–67 |
| "Octopus's Garden" | Abbey Road | 1969 | Abbey Road Studios '68–69 |
| "Paperback Writer" | Single | 1966 | Budokan |
| "Revolution" | Single | 1968 | Abbey Road Studios '68–69 |
| "Sgt. Pepper's Lonely Hearts Club Band" / "With a Little Help from My Friends"^{a} | Sgt. Pepper's Lonely Hearts Club Band | 1967 | Abbey Road Studios '66–67 |
| "Something" | Abbey Road | 1969 | Abbey Road Studios '68–69 |
| "Taxman" | Revolver | 1966 | Budokan |
| "The End"^{c} | Abbey Road | 1969 | Abbey Road Studios (Encore) |
| "Ticket to Ride" | Help! | 1965 | Shea Stadium |
| "Twist and Shout" | Please Please Me | 1963 | Cavern Club |
| "While My Guitar Gently Weeps" | The Beatles^{d} | 1968 | Abbey Road Studios '67–68 |
| "Within You Without You / Tomorrow Never Knows"^{b} | Love | 2006 | Abbey Road Studios '66–67 |
| "Yellow Submarine" | Revolver | 1966 | Abbey Road Studios '66–67 |

^aSongs are only playable back-to-back as a single track.

^bA mashup of the two songs, originally from the Love album.

^cNot initially unlocked in Quickplay, only achievable through completing Story mode.

^dListed in-game as "The Beatles [White Album] (Disc 1)".

^eListed in-game as "The Beatles [White Album] (Disc 2)".

== Downloadable songs track listing ==
In addition to on-disc songs, players could purchase additional downloadable content for The Beatles: Rock Band from their console's respective online stores. Unlike other console games in the Rock Band series, downloadable content for The Beatles: Rock Band was not playable in the other games, nor would The Beatles: Rock Band use content from the other games. Part of this was due to new Dreamscapes that have been created for the downloadable songs. In the end, one song ("All You Need Is Love") and the remaining songs from three albums that were not already on-disc were released as downloadable content; content made available depended on the sales performance of the already available downloadable tracks, as Harmonix stated the costs to produce these tracks—including travel to Abbey Road studios and their engineers' time—were more expensive than their regular Rock Band downloadable songs.

All individual songs (including the two- or three-song segments from the Abbey Road medley) were priced at $1.99 (160 Microsoft Points/200 Wii Points) and were available for download through the PlayStation Network, Xbox Live and the in-game Music Store on the Wii. The first album to be released as downloadable content, Abbey Road, was priced at $16.98 (1360 Microsoft Points) as a whole. Unique to Abbey Road, those that purchased the full album are able to play the entire medley as a single song in addition to the smaller segments offered.

The download of "All You Need Is Love" was originally exclusive to Xbox 360 at launch, with the proceeds of over $200,000 donated to the charity Doctors Without Borders/Médecins Sans Frontières. It was later released for Wii on February 16, 2010 and for PlayStation 3 on March 4, 2010.

All downloadable content for The Beatles: Rock Band was removed from sale on the respective storefronts on May 5, 2016, as the licensing contracts with the rights holder expired, though players that have already purchased this content will still be able to download the songs.

All songs by Lennon–McCartney except "Think for Yourself" and "Within You Without You" by George Harrison, and "What Goes On" by Lennon–McCartney–Starkey.

The following songs are played at Abbey Road Studios except the songs in bold from Rubber Soul which are played at Shea Stadium.

| Song | Album | Year | Release date |
|---|---|---|---|
| "All You Need Is Love" | Magical Mystery Tour | 1967 | September 9, 2009^{a} |
| "Maxwell's Silver Hammer" | Abbey Road | 1969 | October 20, 2009 |
| "Oh! Darling" | Abbey Road | 1969 | October 20, 2009 |
| "Because" | Abbey Road | 1969 | October 20, 2009 |
| "You Never Give Me Your Money"^{b} | Abbey Road | 1969 | October 20, 2009 |
| "Sun King" / "Mean Mr. Mustard"^{b} | Abbey Road | 1969 | October 20, 2009 |
| "Polythene Pam" / "She Came in Through the Bathroom Window"^{b} | Abbey Road | 1969 | October 20, 2009 |
| "Golden Slumbers" / "Carry That Weight" / "The End"^{b} | Abbey Road | 1969 | October 20, 2009 |
| "Her Majesty"^{b} | Abbey Road | 1969 | October 20, 2009 |
| "Abbey Road Medley"^{c} | Abbey Road | 1969 | October 20, 2009 |
| "Fixing a Hole" | Sgt. Pepper's Lonely Hearts Club Band | 1967 | November 17, 2009 |
| "She's Leaving Home" | Sgt. Pepper's Lonely Hearts Club Band | 1967 | November 17, 2009 |
| "Being for the Benefit of Mr. Kite!" | Sgt. Pepper's Lonely Hearts Club Band | 1967 | November 17, 2009 |
| "Within You Without You" | Sgt. Pepper's Lonely Hearts Club Band | 1967 | November 17, 2009 |
| "When I'm Sixty-Four" | Sgt. Pepper's Lonely Hearts Club Band | 1967 | November 17, 2009 |
| "Lovely Rita" | Sgt. Pepper's Lonely Hearts Club Band | 1967 | November 17, 2009 |
| "Sgt. Pepper's Lonely Hearts Club Band (Reprise)" | Sgt. Pepper's Lonely Hearts Club Band | 1967 | November 17, 2009 |
| "A Day in the Life" | Sgt. Pepper's Lonely Hearts Club Band | 1967 | November 17, 2009 |
| "Norwegian Wood (This Bird Has Flown)" | Rubber Soul | 1965 | December 15, 2009 |
| **"You Won't See Me"** | Rubber Soul | 1965 | December 15, 2009 |
| "Nowhere Man" | Rubber Soul | 1965 | December 15, 2009 |
| **"Think for Yourself"** | Rubber Soul | 1965 | December 15, 2009 |
| **"The Word"** | Rubber Soul | 1965 | December 15, 2009 |
| "Michelle" | Rubber Soul | 1965 | December 15, 2009 |
| **"What Goes On"** | Rubber Soul | 1965 | December 15, 2009 |
| "Girl" | Rubber Soul | 1965 | December 15, 2009 |
| "In My Life" | Rubber Soul | 1965 | December 15, 2009 |
| **"Wait"** | Rubber Soul | 1965 | December 15, 2009 |
| **"Run for Your Life"** | Rubber Soul | 1965 | December 15, 2009 |

^aReleased for Wii on February 16, 2010 and for PlayStation 3 on March 4, 2010.

^bSong was only available for individual purchase on Wii. PlayStation 3 and Xbox 360 users must purchase the full Abbey Road album.

^cSong was only available as part of the full Abbey Road album purchase for PlayStation 3 and Xbox 360.
