= This Bird Has Flown – A 40th Anniversary Tribute to the Beatles' Rubber Soul =

Compilation album by various artists
- Released: October 25, 2005
- Length: 42:53
- Label: Razor & Tie
- Producer: Jim Sampas

This Bird Has Flown – A 40th Anniversary Tribute to the Beatles' Rubber Soul is a tribute album by a variety of artists that commemorates the 40th anniversary of the release of the Beatles' 1965 album Rubber Soul. It was released on October 25, 2005, by Razor & Tie. It follows the track listing of the UK version of the album, although the two songs added to the American release are available as bonus tracks on iTunes Music Store.

== Reception ==
Professional ratings
Review scores
Source	Rating
AllMusic	3/5 stars
Pitchfork	5.5/10
Rolling Stone	3.5/5 stars

Writing for AllMusic, Stephen Thomas Erlewine called Sufjan Stevens's cover of "What Goes On" the "only severe misstep" of the album and call the tribute "an album filled with good, generally pleasant covers that in no way replace the original Beatles versions but do offer as a nice reminder of what great songwriters Lennon, McCartney and Harrison were." Conversely, Rob Mitchum of Pitchfork called Stevens's performance "a surprisingly gritty jam" and of the album itself "if it gets anything right about the original Rubber Soul, it's in the sense of perfectly replicating the progenitor's unevenness."

== Track listing ==
All tracks written by Lennon–McCartney, except where noted

This Bird Has Flown – A 40th Anniversary Tribute to the Beatles' Rubber Soul track listing
No.	Title	Artist	Length
1.	"Drive My Car"	The Donnas	2:44
2.	"Norwegian Wood (This Bird Has Flown)"	The Fiery Furnaces	2:57
3.	"You Won't See Me"	Dar Williams	3:34
4.	"Nowhere Man"	Low	2:54
5.	"Think for Yourself" (George Harrison)	Yonder Mountain String Band	2:15
6.	"The Word"	Mindy Smith	3:03
7.	"Michelle"	Ben Harper and the Innocent Criminals	2:56
8.	"What Goes On" (Lennon–McCartney-Richard Starkey)	Sufjan Stevens	5:50
9.	"Girl"	Rhett Miller	3:03
10.	"I'm Looking Through You"	Ted Leo	2:25
11.	"In My Life"	Ben Lee	3:12
12.	"Wait"	Ben Kweller and Albert Hammond Jr.	2:26
13.	"If I Needed Someone" (Harrison)	Nellie McKay	2:15
14.	"Run for Your Life"	Cowboy Junkies	3:07
Total length:			42:53

Bonus tracks (available on iTunes Music Store)
No.	Title	Artist	Length
15.	"I've Just Seen a Face"	Slow Runner	3:27
16.	"It's Only Love"	Sam Champion	2:14
Total length:			48:34

== See also ==
- I Am Sam
