= Think for Yourself =

1965 song by the Beatles

- Cover of the Northern Songs sheet music

Song by the Beatles

from the album Rubber Soul
- Published: Northern Songs
- Released: 3 December 1965
- Recorded: 8 November 1965
- Studio: EMI, London
- Genre: Pop rock; rock
- Length: 2:18
- Label: Parlophone
- Songwriter: George Harrison
- Producer: George Martin

"Think for Yourself" is a song by the English rock band the Beatles from their 1965 album Rubber Soul. It was written by George Harrison, the band's lead guitarist, and, together with "If I Needed Someone", marked the start of his emergence as a songwriter beside John Lennon and Paul McCartney. The song's lyrics advocate independent thinking and reflect the Beatles' move towards more sophisticated concepts in their writing at this stage of their career. The song has invited interpretation as both a political statement and a love song, as Harrison dismisses a lover or friend in a tone that some commentators liken to Bob Dylan's 1965 single "Positively 4th Street". Among musicologists, the composition has been recognised as adventurous in the degree of tonal ambiguity it employs across parallel major and minor keys and through its suggestion of multiple musical modes.

The Beatles recorded "Think for Yourself" in November 1965, towards the end of the sessions for Rubber Soul. In a departure from convention, the track includes two bass guitar parts – one standard and one played through a fuzzbox. Performed by McCartney, this fuzz bass serves as a lead guitar line throughout the song and marked the first time that a bass guitar had been recorded using a fuzzbox device, as opposed to manipulating equipment to achieve a distorted sound. The group overdubbed their harmony vocals during a lighthearted session that was also intended to provide material for their 1965 fan-club Christmas disc. A snippet from this session was used in the Beatles' 1968 animated film Yellow Submarine. The song has also appeared on the 1976 compilation The Best of George Harrison and on the 1999 Yellow Submarine Songtrack album.

== Background and inspiration ==
"Think for Yourself" must be about "somebody" from the sound of it – but all this time later, I don't quite recall who … Probably the Government.

— George Harrison, 1979

In his 1980 autobiography, I, Me, Mine, George Harrison recalls little about the inspiration behind "Think for Yourself". He said that his intention was to target narrow-minded thinking and identified the British government as a possible source. Partly as a result of the vagueness of his comments, the song has invited interpretation as both a political commentary and a statement on a failing personal relationship.

The song reflects the influence of Bob Dylan, with whom the Beatles had spent time socialising in May 1965, in London, and then in mid August, following the band's concert at Shea Stadium in New York. Just as their songs had encouraged Dylan to embrace rock music, Dylan's work inspired the Beatles, and particularly Harrison, as a nascent songwriter, to address more sophisticated concepts than the standard love song. In addition, since March that year, Harrison's outlook had been transformed by his and John Lennon's experiences with the hallucinogenic drug LSD; in a 1987 interview, he said that the drug had revealed to him the futility of the band's widespread fame. (Note: In the same interview, for Rolling Stone magazine, Harrison said that LSD "just opened up this whole other consciousness … It changed me, and there was no way back to what I was before." He added, referring to the pressures of Beatlemania: "And we still had to continue being fab, you know. Now with that added perspective.") Author George Case groups "Think for Yourself" with two Lennon–McCartney compositions from the Beatles' Rubber Soul album – "I'm Looking Through You" and "The Word" – as examples of how the band's focus had progressed "from excited songs of juvenile love to adult meditations on independence, estrangement and brotherhood". In Ringo Starr's later recollection, Rubber Soul was the Beatles' "departure record", written and recorded during a period when, largely through the influence of marijuana, "We were expanding in all areas of our lives, opening up to a lot of different attitudes."

== Composition ==
=== Musical form ===
"Think for Yourself" has a 4/4 time signature and is set to a moderate rock beat. After a two-bar introduction, the structure comprises three combinations of verse and chorus, with the final chorus being repeated in full, followed by what musicologist Alan Pollack terms a "petit-reprise of the last phrase" to close the song. The chorus sections contrast rhythmically with the verses, providing a more upbeat mood.

"Think for Yourself"
The verse contains a variety of chord changes that contribute to the song-wide ambiguity in key and musical mode.

The song's musical key is a combination of G major and G minor. Pollack comments that whereas Lennon and Paul McCartney had regularly employed a major key and its parallel minor to provide an element of contrast in their songs, Harrison's composition ensures that the two modes are "blended", so creating a form that is "neither quite really Major nor minor". In the description of musicologist Dominic Pedler, while G major appears to be the central key, the song's musical premise involves permanent tonic key ambiguity and "restless root movement" through extensive borrowing from the parallel minor key. The G7 chord over the introduction suggests a tonic key of G major and a musical mode of G Mixolydian, yet the verse opens with A minor, the ii chord in Roman numeral analysis, which suggests A Dorian mode, and the subsequent change to D minor then suggests A Aeolian mode, in which the chord represents iv. The immediate shift to a B♭ chord (♭III in G major) followed by a C chord (IV in G major) creates further ambiguity, since these chords hint at a ♭VI–♭VII rock run in D Aeolian. During the chorus, Pedler continues, the anticipated tonic-identifying V–I (D7–G7) shift is preceded by an unexpected ♭VI (E♭/B♭) chord in second inversion that undermines its tonal direction.

Where is the music going? Where does it feel it should settle? What is the key centre, and the mode? The whole point is to think for yourself!

— Musicologist Dominic Pedler, 2003

The unusual chord progression is an example of the Beatles' use of chords for added harmonic expression, a device that Harrison adopted from Lennon's approach to melody. Musicologist Walter Everett describes the composition as "a tour de force of altered scale degrees". He adds that, such is the ambiguity throughout, "its tonal quality forms the perfect conspirator with the text's and the rhythm's hesitations and unexpected turns." (Note: Pedler similarly writes that, while the song appears to defy formal compositional logic, "it is the combination of this musical uncertainty with the lyrical theme that subconsciously makes perfect sense." He considers this overlapping of major and minor harmony and restless root movement to be an intriguing characteristic of Harrison's songwriting as far back as "Don't Bother Me" in 1963.) Pollack also views the composition as musically adventurous; he identifies it as a "curious stylistic hybrid" in the pop/rock genre, comprising blues-inflected motifs within a folk-based framework.

=== Lyrics ===
The song's message recalls that of Dylan's September 1965 single "Positively 4th Street", as Harrison appears to be ending a relationship, possibly with a lover. The lyrics adopt an accusatory stance from the opening line: "I've got a word or two to say about the things that you do." Author Ian Inglis describes the song as "a withering attack" in which "Harrison's blunt 'I left you far behind' and Dylan's curt 'It's not my problem' [from 'Positively 4th Street'] could be spoken by the same voice." Harrison also incorporates Dylan-esque surrealism in his reference to "opaque" minds and in the line "the good things that we can have if we close our eyes".

According to Beatles biographer Jonathan Gould, despite Harrison having envisaged "Think for Yourself" as a form of social commentary, contemporary listeners most likely interpreted it as a love song, given the limited perception afforded the work of pop artists. As a result, Gould includes the composition among "a new genre of 'anti-love' songs", a style that was inaugurated by Dylan in 1964 and later developed by the Rolling Stones. When read as a farewell to a romantic partner, according to James Decker, an English literature academic and Henry Miller scholar, the lyrics express the view that their relationship is based on a false reality, whereby the individual is submerged within the bounds of the relationship. In the final verse, Harrison urges his partner to "try thinking more", confident that she too will come to see the emptiness in her life choices. While adhering to this particular interpretation of "Think for Yourself", Decker says that "Harrison and the Beatles have thus raised the stakes from the naïve idealism of hand-holding" that typified love songs of the period.

In the opinion of Steve LaBate of Paste magazine, the song "implores listeners to question what they're told and live a more examined, conscious life". Author and critic Kenneth Womack identifies an air of superiority in Harrison's lyrics. In his description, the song represents "the inaugural entry (with shades of 'Don't Bother Me') in Harrison's existential philosophy, later to be adumbrated by Eastern religion and thought, about the mind-numbingly automatic and insensate manner in which human beings undertake their lives in the workaday world".

== Recording ==
=== Basic track ===
The Beatles recorded "Think for Yourself" towards the end of the sessions for Rubber Soul, at which point they were under pressure to meet the deadline for completing the album. Recording for the song, which had a working title of "Won't Be There With You", took place at EMI Studios (now Abbey Road Studios) in London on 8 November 1965. The group achieved a satisfactory basic track in one take, with a line-up comprising two electric guitars, bass guitar and drums. Lennon also overdubbed a keyboard part, played on either a Vox Continental organ or an electric piano.

=== Fuzz bass part ===
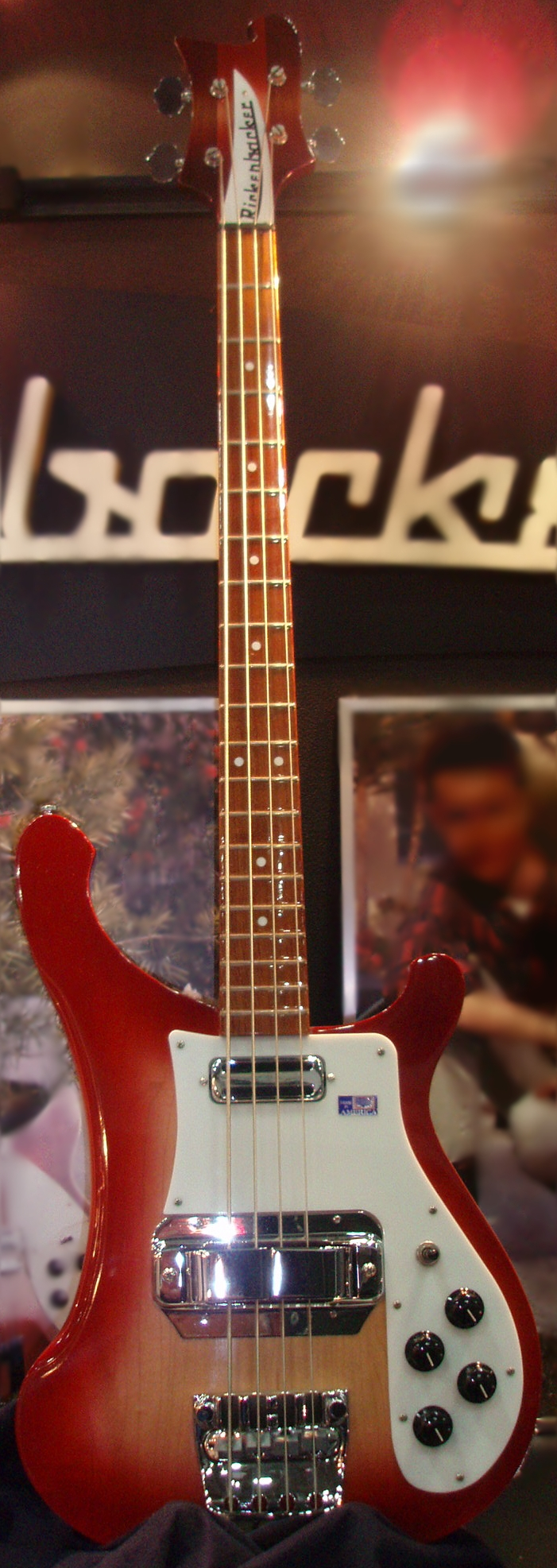
McCartney used a Rickenbacker 4001S to overdub the fuzz bass, which effectively serves as a lead guitar part.

McCartney overdubbed an additional bass part, which he played through a fuzzbox effect unit known as a Tone Bender. The recording of a bass through a fuzzbox was unprecedented at the time, as was the inclusion of both a standard bass and "fuzz bass" on a song. (Note: Fuzz bass had been approximated – that is, achieved without a formal effects unit – on recordings since the mid 1950s. In those instances, bassists removed a tube from their amplifier to give their playing an overdriven sound.) Gould and Everett consider that the Beatles' adoption of this effect was inspired by the Rolling Stones' 1965 hit "(I Can't Get No) Satisfaction", on which the distorted, fuzz-tone sound of the lead guitar riff had been a key element. However, Harrison credited Phil Spector's production of "Zip-a-Dee-Doo-Dah", by Bob B. Soxx & the Blue Jeans – a 1962 recording that, after the distorted lead guitar sound had been created accidentally in the studio, led to Gibson's invention of the first fuzzbox. (Note: Harrison had experimented with the Gibson-made Maestro Fuzz-Tone effect since 1963, beginning with the session for "She Loves You", but the Beatles had never used it on their released recordings.)

McCartney's riff-dominated part serves the role of a lead guitar throughout the track. The inclusion of fuzz bass, and its layering beside a standard bass part, typified the Beatles' willingness to experiment with sound on Rubber Soul. McCartney used a Rickenbacker 4001S, a solid-body guitar that gave his bass playing on Rubber Soul a more precise tone than he had been able to achieve with his usual Höfner "violin bass". Inglis comments that, in its dialogue with Harrison's vocal lines, the "growling" fuzz bass contributes to the song's "persistent mood of menace", while Gould describes the effect as "the snarls of an enraged schnauzer, snapping and striking at its lead".

=== Vocal overdubs ===
Typical of the group's sound on the album, the song's arrangement includes three-part harmonies sung in homorhythm. Since the band also had to have their annual fan club Christmas disc completed at this time, their producer, George Martin, instructed the studio engineers to set up a second, ambient microphone and tape the Beatles as they rehearsed and recorded their vocal parts for the track. The tapes captured the three vocalists – Harrison, Lennon and McCartney – engaging in humorous banter and often unable to remember their parts. As a rare record of the group at work in the studio, the "Think for Yourself" rehearsal tape has invited comparison with the Beatles' Let It Be documentary film, made in January 1969. Whereas that film documents a period of acrimony among the band members, the 1965 tape shows them, in author Mark Hertsgaard's description, "clearly [taking] joy in one another's company". (Note: Harrison later cited Rubber Soul as his favourite Beatles album. As well as highlighting the group's marijuana consumption throughout this period, he attributed the album's success to their "suddenly hearing sounds that we weren't able to hear before", adding: "we were being more influenced by other people's music and everything was blossoming at that time …") Once the vocals had been recorded successfully, and then double-tracked, Starr overdubbed tambourine and maracas.

Contrary to Martin's hopes, nothing from the rehearsal tape was deemed suitable for the Beatles' 1965 Christmas record. In 1968, six seconds' worth of Harrison, Lennon and McCartney's a capella singing – repeating the line "And you've got time to rectify" – was used in the soundtrack of the Yellow Submarine animated film. (Note: The excerpt appears in the scene where the Beatles return to Pepperland and awaken the Lord Mayor from the despondency instigated by the Blue Meanies.) McCartney subsequently incorporated other segments from the "Think for Yourself" rehearsal into his 2000 experimental album Liverpool Sound Collage. A fifteen-minute edit of the full tape became available unofficially in 1991 on the bootleg compilation Unsurpassed Masters, Volume 7. In 1995, a mix of the song featuring only vocals was among several tracks that were in the running for inclusion on the Anthology 2 compilation album but were ultimately passed over.

== Release and reception ==
EMI's Parlophone label released Rubber Soul on 3 December 1965 in Britain, with "Think for Yourself" sequenced as the fifth track, between "Nowhere Man" and "The Word". (Note: For the North American release, however, Capitol Records altered the content of Rubber Soul, so that "Think for Yourself" followed "You Won't See Me".) The album was a commercial and critical success, although initially some reviewers in the UK were confused by the band's more mature approach. The release also marked the start of a period when other artists, in an attempt to emulate the Beatles' achievement, sought to create albums as works of artistic merit, with a consistently high standard of original compositions and with increasingly novel sounds. Among the albums influenced by Rubber Soul was the Rolling Stones' Aftermath, which included fuzz-toned bass parts on the songs "Under My Thumb" and "Mother's Little Helper".

Author John Kruth writes that, with its vitriolic tone and an "edge" that was unfamiliar in the Beatles' work, "Think for Yourself" was "somewhat startling" to many listeners. (Note: Writing in December 2015, historian Marc Myers commented that Rubber Soul was initially "unsettling" for many American teenagers, since: "Instead of cheerleading for love, the album's songs held cryptic messages about thinking for yourself, the hypnotic power of women, something called 'getting high' and bedding down with the opposite sex. Clearly, growing up wasn't going to be easy.") In his album review for the NME, Allen Evans interpreted the song's message as "advice to someone who's going off the rails to think for himself and rectify things", and he admired the track's "good tempo and vocal sound". Record Mirror's review panel opined: "Nice song but a feeling hereabouts that there's a sameness about some of the melody-construction ideas. Maybe we'll lose it later on …" While recognising Rubber Soul as another example of the Beatles "setting trends in this world of pop", KRLA Beat highlighted the "wonderful sound effect" created by McCartney's fuzz bass and concluded: "a good, strong, driving beat will keep this one on top." Melody Maker said that "Think for Yourself" was among the album's best tracks and also admired its "double tempo" sections and "good chugging maraca beat". Michael Lydon, who interviewed Lennon and McCartney for Newsweek's laudatory feature on the Beatles in early 1966, quoted the song's chorus in the conclusion to his 1972 article for The Boston Globe, in which he reflected on the passing of the 1960s cultural revolution. He introduced the lyrics with a statement on the Beatles' impact: "Freedom to have a good time, to boogie, they showed, was a practical possibility for the average human. I'm glad I got the message."

"Think for Yourself" was one of the seven Beatles tracks that Capitol Records included on the 1976 compilation album The Best of George Harrison, released following the expiration of Harrison's contract with EMI. Coinciding with the release of the newly restored Yellow Submarine film in 1999, a new mix of the song was issued on the Beatles' Yellow Submarine Songtrack album.

== Retrospective assessment and legacy ==
George Harrison's spiritual investigations would soon initiate an entire genre of songwriting. "Think For Yourself" was the first sign that he had a voice of his own, every bit as cynical as Lennon's about the trappings of everyday life, but holding out the study of the mind and the universe as a panacea.

— Peter Doggett, The Beatles Diary, 2001

Among Beatles biographers, Tim Riley considers the track to be "a step beyond" Harrison's two contributions on Help!, with the fuzz bass providing "just the right guttural cynicism", yet he says the song lacks the "melodic sonorities and layered texture" that distinguishes the guitarist's other Rubber Soul composition, "If I Needed Someone". Riley adds that "Think for Yourself" merely serves to provide contrast with the Lennon songs either side of it on the album. (Note: In his analysis of "Think for Yourself", Alan Pollack comments on the possibility that the song is ill-served by this sequencing. He says that the track engenders a different reaction when heard after McCartney's "You Won't See Me", rather than "Nowhere Man".) Conversely, Ian MacDonald finds the song underrated and "less ingratiating but more incisive" than "If I Needed Someone". While he considers that the group's performance could have been improved on, MacDonald admires the "real fervour" in McCartney's vocal over the choruses. Richie Unterberger of AllMusic views both tracks as evidence that Harrison was "developing into a fine songwriter" on Rubber Soul, a view echoed by author Robert Rodriguez.

In his review of the song for AllMusic, Thomas Ward deems it one of Harrison's weakest compositions. He says that the track offers "a very dated, rather patronising lyric and rather bland melody", although he also recognises "an ingenious chord sequence and, typically, a great introduction". Alex Young of Consequence of Sound describes it as a "vital" inclusion on Rubber Soul, as the first track to show how "this album is truly the champion of making bitterness sound cheerful." In 2010, Rolling Stone ranked "Think for Yourself" at number 75 in its list of the "100 Greatest Beatles Songs". The magazine's editors wrote that while the Beatles created the track in obvious haste and under the influence of marijuana, these conditions worked to the song's advantage, lending it "an unchained, garage-band feel". Dominic Pedler cites "Think for Yourself" as an example of the extent to which Harrison contributed to the Beatles' legacy as writers of pioneering, original melodies. He recognises the song as "harmonically outrageous" and "a maverick blueprint for left-field pop-rock".

Writing in The Guardian on the 50th anniversary of the album's release, Bob Stanley described "Think for Yourself" as "cool but fierce". He grouped it with "Norwegian Wood" and "Girl" as songs that conveyed the Beatles' new, sophisticated outlook at the time and, decades later, evoked progressive women such as Edie Sedgwick, Maureen Cleave and Pauline Boty. He said that the same three songs were statements that ensured that Rubber Soul would remain "fresh" for another 50 years. Also writing in December 2015, Emily Mackay of the NME described the song as "acerbic" and empathetic with the confused sexual politics of "Norwegian Wood". She recognised Harrison's "assertion of independent-mindedness" as a forerunner to Lennon's 1968 song "Revolution". In his 2015 book 1965: The Most Revolutionary Year in Music, Andrew Grant Jackson identifies it as the Beatles' contribution to a "subgenre" of protest songs that emerged in 1965, in which artists railed against "oppressive conformity itself" rather than political issues. He views it as one of the musical statements that, informed by mass media, hallucinogenic drugs and the introduction of the contraceptive pill, "chronicled and propelled a social reformation as the old world forged its uneasy synthesis with the new".

Unterberger regrets that the Beatles did not attempt to play more of their material from the 1965–66 era in concert before deciding to quit touring in late 1966. He identifies "Think for Yourself" and "Drive My Car", along with some of the guitar-based tracks on their Revolver album, as songs that "would have worked well in a live setting". (Note: Although Harrison never performed it in concert, "Think for Yourself" was one of the songs he rehearsed before his 1991 Japanese tour with Eric Clapton.) Yonder Mountain String Band have performed "Think for Yourself", featuring a bluegrass arrangement that includes banjo and mandolin. They also contributed a recording of the track to This Bird Has Flown – A 40th Anniversary Tribute to the Beatles' Rubber Soul in 2005. Pete Shelley covered the song for Yellow Submarine Resurfaces, a CD issued with the July 2012 issue of Mojo magazine. Kruth describes Shelley's version as "an exhilarating punk anthem" that includes "crunchy guitar chords" in the style of the Kinks' "All Day and All of the Night".

== Personnel ==
According to Ian MacDonald except where noted:

- George Harrison – lead vocal, lead guitar
- John Lennon – harmony vocal, Vox Continental organ, rhythm guitar
- Paul McCartney – harmony vocal, bass, fuzz bass
- Ringo Starr – drums, tambourine, maracas

== Sources ==
- Allison, Dale C. Jr. (2006). The Love There That's Sleeping: The Art and Spirituality of George Harrison. New York, NY: Continuum. ISBN 978-0-8264-1917-0.
- Babiuk, Andy (2002). Beatles Gear: All the Fab Four's Instruments, from Stage to Studio. San Francisco, CA: Backbeat Books. ISBN 0-87930-731-5.
- Badman, Keith (2001). The Beatles Diary Volume 2: After the Break-Up 1970–2001. London: Omnibus Press. ISBN 978-0-7119-8307-6.
- The Beatles (2000). The Beatles Anthology. San Francisco, CA: Chronicle Books. ISBN 0-8118-2684-8.
- Case, George (2010). Out of Our Heads: Rock 'n' Roll Before the Drugs Wore Off. Milwaukee, WI: Backbeat Books. ISBN 978-0-87930-967-1.
- Clayson, Alan (2003). George Harrison. London: Sanctuary. ISBN 1-86074-489-3.
- Decker, James M. (2009). "'Try Thinking More': Rubber Soul and the transformation of pop". In Womack, Kenneth (ed.). The Cambridge Companion to the Beatles. Cambridge, UK: Cambridge University Press. ISBN 978-0-521-68976-2.
- Everett, Walter (1999). The Beatles as Musicians: Revolver Through the Anthology. New York, NY: Oxford University Press. ISBN 0-19-512941-5.
- Everett, Walter (2001). The Beatles as Musicians: The Quarry Men Through Rubber Soul. New York, NY: Oxford University Press. ISBN 0-19-514105-9.
- Everett, Walter (2006). "Painting Their Room in a Colorful Way". In Womack, Kenneth; Davis, Todd F. (eds.). Reading the Beatles: Cultural Studies, Literary Criticism, and the Fab Four. Albany, NY: State University of New York Press. ISBN 0-7914-6716-3.
- Everett, Walter (2009). The Foundations of Rock: From "Blue Suede Shoes" to "Suite: Judy Blue Eyes"'. New York, NY: Oxford University Press. ISBN 978-0-19-531024-5.
- Frontani, Michael R. (2007). The Beatles: Image and the Media. Jackson, MS: University Press of Mississippi. ISBN 978-1-57806-966-8.
- Gould, Jonathan (2007). Can't Buy Me Love: The Beatles, Britain and America. London: Piatkus. ISBN 978-0-7499-2988-6.
- Guesdon, Jean-Michel; Margotin, Philippe (2013). All the Songs: The Story Behind Every Beatles Release. New York, NY: Black Dog & Leventhal. ISBN 978-1-57912-952-1.
- Harrison, George (2002) [1980]. I, Me, Mine. San Francisco, CA: Chronicle Books. ISBN 978-0-8118-5900-4.
- Hertsgaard, Mark (1996). A Day in the Life: The Music and Artistry of the Beatles. London: Pan Books. ISBN 0-330-33891-9.
- Howard, David N. (2004). Sonic Alchemy: Visionary Music Producers and Their Maverick Recordings. Milwaukee, WI: Hal Leonard. ISBN 0-634-05560-7.
- Huntley, Elliot J. (2006). Mystical One: George Harrison – After the Break-up of the Beatles. Toronto, ON: Guernica Editions. ISBN 1-55071-197-0.
- Inglis, Ian (2010). The Words and Music of George Harrison. Santa Barbara, CA: Praeger. ISBN 978-0-313-37532-3.
- Jackson, Andrew Grant (2015). 1965: The Most Revolutionary Year in Music. New York, NY: Thomas Dunne Books. ISBN 978-1-250-05962-8.
- Kruth, John (2015). This Bird Has Flown: The Enduring Beauty of Rubber Soul, Fifty Years On. Milwaukee, WI: Backbeat Books. ISBN 978-1617135736.
- Leng, Simon (2006). While My Guitar Gently Weeps: The Music of George Harrison. Milwaukee, WI: Hal Leonard. ISBN 978-1-4234-0609-9.
- Lewisohn, Mark (2005) [1988]. The Complete Beatles Recording Sessions: The Official Story of the Abbey Road Years 1962–1970. London: Bounty Books. ISBN 978-0-7537-2545-0.
- MacDonald, Ian (2005). Revolution in the Head: The Beatles' Records and the Sixties (2nd rev. ed.). Chicago, IL: Chicago Review Press. ISBN 978-1-55652-733-3.
- Madinger, Chip; Easter, Mark (2000). Eight Arms to Hold You: The Solo Beatles Compendium. Chesterfield, MO: 44.1 Productions. ISBN 0-615-11724-4.
- Miles, Barry (2001). The Beatles Diary Volume 1: The Beatles Years. London: Omnibus Press. ISBN 0-7119-8308-9.
- Pedler, Dominic (2003). The Songwriting Secrets of the Beatles. London: Omnibus Press. ISBN 978-0-7119-8167-6.
- Riley, Tim (2002) [1988]. Tell Me Why – The Beatles: Album by Album, Song by Song, the Sixties and After. Cambridge, MA: Da Capo Press. ISBN 978-0-306-81120-3.
- Rodriguez, Robert (2012). Revolver: How the Beatles Reimagined Rock 'n' Roll. Milwaukee, WI: Backbeat Books. ISBN 978-1-61713-009-0.
- Shea, Stuart; Rodriguez, Robert (2007). Fab Four FAQ: Everything Left to Know About the Beatles ... and More!. New York, NY: Hal Leonard. ISBN 978-1-4234-2138-2.
- Smith, Chris (2009). 101 Albums That Changed Popular Music. New York, NY: Oxford University Press. ISBN 978-0-19-537371-4.
- Spitz, Bob (2005). The Beatles: The Biography. New York, NY: Little, Brown and Company. ISBN 1-84513-160-6.
- Turner, Steve (1999). A Hard Day's Write: The Stories Behind Every Beatles Song (2nd ed.). New York, NY: Carlton/HarperCollins. ISBN 0-06-273698-1.
- Turner, Steve (2016). Beatles '66: The Revolutionary Year. New York, NY: HarperLuxe. ISBN 978-0-06-249713-0.
- Unterberger, Richie (2006). The Unreleased Beatles: Music & Film. San Francisco, CA: Backbeat Books. ISBN 978-0-87930-892-6.
- Williams, Richard (2002). "Rubber Soul: Stretching the Boundaries". Mojo Special Limited Edition: 1000 Days That Shook the World (The Psychedelic Beatles – 1 April 1965 to 26 December 1967). London: Emap.
- Winn, John C. (2008). Way Beyond Compare: The Beatles' Recorded Legacy, Volume One, 1962–1965. New York, NY: Three Rivers Press. ISBN 978-0-3074-5239-9.
- Womack, Kenneth (2007). Long and Winding Roads: The Evolving Artistry of the Beatles. New York, NY: Continuum. ISBN 978-0-8264-1746-6.
- Womack, Kenneth (2014). The Beatles Encyclopedia: Everything Fab Four. Santa Barbara, CA: ABC-CLIO. ISBN 978-0-313-39171-2.
- Zolten, Jerry (2009). "The Beatles as Recording Artists". In Womack, Kenneth (ed.). The Cambridge Companion to the Beatles. Cambridge, UK: Cambridge University Press. ISBN 978-0-521-68976-2.
