= Charles Front =

British illustrator

Charles Front is a British illustrator, best known for designing the lettering on the 1965 Beatles album Rubber Soul.

He has illustrated several books, including A Child's Bible, Never Say Macbeth, The Great White Whale, The Little Dressmaker and Carbonel and Calidor. He worked on the BBC children's TV series Jackanory.

Front taught art and illustration at the Barking College Of Technology in the 1970s, and one of his students was special effects artist and animator Alan Friswell who is currently the official restorer for the Ray & Diana Harryhausen Foundation. Friswell credits Front as being an inspirational teacher and influence on his work.

He was the art editor of MANNA, the magazine of the Reform Judaism movement.

Sheila and Charles Front created children's books together. They are the parents of actress Rebecca Front.
