= What Goes On (Beatles song) =

1965 single by the Beatles

- US picture sleeve (reverse)

Single by the Beatles
- A-side: "Nowhere Man"
- Released: 3 December 1965 (UK Rubber Soul album); 21 February 1966 (US single)
- Recorded: 4 November 1965
- Studio: EMI, London
- Genre: Country and western; rockabilly
- Length: 2:50
- Label: Capitol
- Songwriter: Lennon–McCartney–Starkey
- Producer: George Martin

The Beatles US singles chronology
"We Can Work It Out" / "Day Tripper" (1965)	"Nowhere Man" / "What Goes On" (1966)	"Paperback Writer" (1966)

"What Goes On" is a song by the English rock band the Beatles, featured as the eighth track on their 1965 album Rubber Soul. The song was later released as the B-side of the US single "Nowhere Man", and then as the tenth track on the North America-only album Yesterday and Today. It is the only song by the band credited to Lennon–McCartney–Starkey and the only song on Rubber Soul that features Ringo Starr on lead vocals. The song reached number 81 on the US Billboard Hot 100 in 1966.

== Composition ==
John Lennon wrote the song in early 1959, likely at 251 Menlove Avenue. The early version of the song is heavily inspired by Buddy Holly, and differed substantially from the Rubber Soul version with only the chorus being the same.

The Beatles nearly recorded the song in March 1963, but ultimately did not do so until November 1965 for Rubber Soul. According to Lennon, "it was resurrected with a middle eight thrown in, probably with Paul [McCartney]'s help". Barry Miles also claimed that McCartney and Starr combined for the middle eight. There is no formal middle eight in the song, although one chorus and one verse are extended; Musicologist and writer Ian MacDonald believes those longer sections were written by McCartney. Starr contributed to the lyrics, his first-ever composing credit on a Beatles song. When asked about his contribution Starr jokingly responded, "[I wrote] about five words to 'What Goes On' and I haven't done a thing since." MacDonald and musicologist Walter Everett write that Starr's contribution was the lyric "Waiting for the tides of time". MacDonald calls these lines, "pseudo-Dylanesque". The first pressing of the single accidentally omitted "Starkey" in the songwriting credit.

== Recording ==
=== "From Me to You" session, 1963 ===
On 5 March 1963, during a session for "From Me To You" and "Thank You Girl", the Beatles wanted to record "What Goes On" and "One After 909" (then titled "The One After 909"). With only enough time remaining to record one more song, they opted for "The One After 909". John Lennon and Paul McCartney recorded a demo of this version in 1963, but the song was not used until 1965 as Ringo Starr's vocal piece for Rubber Soul.

=== Rubber Soul sessions, 1965 ===
Neil Aspinall recalls that McCartney made a multitrack home demo of the song in 1965: "When Paul wanted to show Ringo how 'What Goes On' sounded he made up a multi-track tape. Onto this went Paul singing, Paul playing lead guitar, Paul playing bass and Paul playing drums. Then Ringo listened to the finished tape and added his own ideas before the recording session."

The Rubber Soul version was recorded in one take, with overdubs, during a late-night session on 4 November 1965. George Martin produced, supported by engineers Norman Smith, Ken Scott and Graham Platt. Everett writes that Lennon's guitar part is in the style of Steve Cropper and his "Memphis 'chick' rhythm part." He adds that George Harrison includes "rockabilly string crossings, double-stops, and portamento neighbors." Starr likely recorded a guide vocal on the basic track, wiped over by his final vocal overdub. The original guide vocal can be heard through the drum mic during Starr's solo and during the coda. As well, during the verse before the lead break after Starr sings "tell me why," Lennon says, "We already told you why!", in reference to the Beatles' "Tell Me Why" from A Hard Day's Night.

Martin, assisted by Smith and Jerry Boys, mixed the song for mono and stereo on 9 November 1965. Harrison's Gretsch Tennessean guitar is muted during the last two bars of the mono mix. Everett suggests this likely happened because the engineer meant to mute the vocal track but forgot that Harrison's guitar was on that track as well.

== Release and reception ==
The Beatles released "What Goes On" in both mono and stereo in the U.K. on the 3 December 1965 release Rubber Soul. Capitol released the song as the B-side to the U.S. only single "Nowhere Man" on 21 February 1966. Despite being the B-side, the song entered the Billboard Hot 100 for two weeks, reaching #81. Capitol pulled the track from the North American release of Rubber Soul and instead included it on the North American-only album Yesterday and Today, released 20 June 1966.

Critics have generally been unfavourable towards the song when comparing it with the others on Rubber Soul. Beatles writer Kenneth Womack asserts that the song is "quite arguably the weakest and most incongruous track on the album." Professor of English and writer James M. Decker writes the song represents, "a retrograde achievement lyrically," then adds, "Lyrically formulaic and musically plain (though perhaps the 'country' feel is offered as an arch parody of the lyrics), 'What Goes On' anchors the Beatles in the very tradition that they are exploding during many other moments on Rubber Soul." MacDonald writes the song "has the same sloppy country-and-western ambience as "Act Naturally". For AllMusic, Richie Unterberger writes the song is an "enjoyable if lightweight" country & western-flavoured entry in the Beatles catalogue. He praises Harrison's guitar work, which "again marks him as the finest disciple of Carl Perkins." Everett describes McCartney's bass as "soulful." He further writes that after "What Goes On", the Beatles rockabilly style went "into dormancy".

== Cover versions ==
Sufjan Stevens recorded a cover of the song in 2005 for the compilation album, This Bird Has Flown – A 40th Anniversary Tribute to the Beatles' Rubber Soul. In a review for Pitchfork, Rob Mitchum writes that Stevens takes Starr's "abysmal country tune" and turns it into, "a really good Sufjan Stevens song, arranged for the full Illinoisemaker band with choral interludes, diving strings, and a surprisingly gritty jam." Barry Walters of Rolling Stone magazine writes, "Changing chords, rewriting melody, overhauling rhythms and resequencing large chunks of lyrics, the ever-ambitious Sufjan Stevens turns 'What Goes On' inside out with an intricate stop-and-start arrangement that affirms Rubber Soul's elastic strength." Stephen Thomas Erlewine of AllMusic was less favourable, describing Stevens track as, "the only severe misstep in an album filled with good, generally pleasant covers."

== Personnel ==
According to Ian MacDonald:

- Ringo Starr – lead vocal, drums
- John Lennon – harmony vocal, rhythm guitar
- Paul McCartney – harmony vocal, bass guitar
- George Harrison – lead guitar

== Charts ==
=== Weekly charts ===
Chart (1966)	Peak position
US Billboard Hot 100	81
