= Rubber Soul =

1965 studio album by the Beatles

Studio album by the Beatles
- Released: 3 December 1965
- Recorded: 12 October – 11 November 1965 (except 17 June 1965 for "Wait")
- Studios: EMI, London
- Genres: Folk rock; rock; pop
- Length: 34:59
- Labels: Parlophone; Capitol
- Producer: George Martin

The Beatles chronology
Help! (1965)	Rubber Soul (1965)	Revolver (1966)

The Beatles North American chronology
Help! (1965)	Rubber Soul (1965)	Yesterday and Today (1966)

Rubber Soul is the sixth studio album by the English rock band the Beatles. It was released on 3 December 1965 in the United Kingdom on EMI's Parlophone label, accompanied by the non-album double A-side single "We Can Work It Out" / "Day Tripper". The original North American release, issued by Capitol Records, contains ten of the fourteen songs and two tracks withheld from the band's Help! (1965) album. Rubber Soul was described as an important artistic achievement by the band, meeting a highly favourable critical response and topping sales charts in Britain and the United States for several weeks.

The recording sessions took place in London over a four-week period beginning in October 1965. For the first time in their career, the Beatles were able to record an album free of concert, radio or film commitments. Often referred to as a folk rock album, particularly in its Capitol configuration, Rubber Soul incorporates a mix of pop, soul and folk musical styles. The title derives from the colloquialism "plastic soul" and was the Beatles' way of acknowledging their lack of authenticity compared to the African-American soul artists they admired. After A Hard Day's Night (1964), it was the second Beatles LP to contain only original material.

The songs demonstrate the Beatles' increasing maturity as lyricists, and in their incorporation of brighter guitar tones and new instrumentation such as sitar, harmonium and fuzz bass, the group striving for more expressive sounds and arrangements for their music. The project marked a progression in the band's treatment of the album format as an artistic platform, an approach they continued to develop with Revolver (1966) and Sgt. Pepper's Lonely Hearts Club Band (1967). The four songs omitted by Capitol, including the February 1966 single "Nowhere Man", later appeared on the North American release Yesterday and Today (1966).

Rubber Soul was highly influential on the Beatles' peers, leading to a widespread focus away from singles and onto creating albums of consistently high-quality songs. It has been recognised by music critics as an album that opened up the possibilities of pop music in terms of lyrical and musical scope, and as a key work in the creation of styles such as psychedelia and progressive rock. Among its many appearances on critics' best-album lists, Rolling Stone ranked it fifth on the magazine's 2012 list of the "500 Greatest Albums of All Time". In 2000, it was voted at number 34 in the third edition of Colin Larkin's book All Time Top 1000 Albums. The album was certified 6× platinum by the Recording Industry Association of America (RIAA) in 1997, indicating shipments of at least six million copies in the US. In 2013, Rubber Soul was certified platinum by the British Phonographic Industry (BPI) for UK sales since 1994. An expanded reissue was released in 2026.

== Background ==
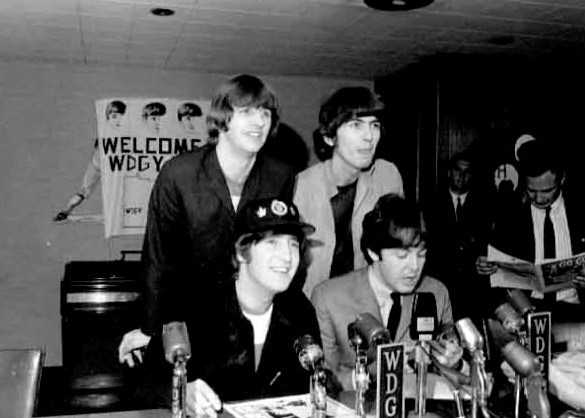
The Beatles at a press conference during their August 1965 North American tour, two months before the start of the Rubber Soul sessions

Most of the songs on Rubber Soul were composed soon after the Beatles' return to London following their August 1965 North American tour. The album reflects the influence of their month in America. They set a new attendance record when they played to over 55,000 at Shea Stadium on 15 August, met Bob Dylan in New York and their longtime hero Elvis Presley in Los Angeles. Although the Beatles had released their album Help! that same month, the requirement for a new album in time for Christmas was in keeping with the schedule established with EMI in 1963 by Brian Epstein, the group's manager, and George Martin, their record producer.

In their new songs, the Beatles drew inspiration from soul music acts signed to the Motown and Stax record labels, particularly the singles they heard on US radio that summer, and from the contemporary folk rock of Dylan and the Byrds. Author Robert Rodriguez highlights the Byrds as having achieved "special notice as an American act that had taken something from the Brits, added to it, then sent it back". In doing so, Rodriguez continues, the Byrds had joined the Beatles and Dylan in "a common pool of influence exchange, where each act gave and took from the other in equal measure". (Note: Along with the Mamas & the Papas, the Byrds started as a folk act but embraced rock as a result of the Beatles. Both of these American bands drew from George Harrison's use of the Rickenbacker 12-string electric guitar in 1964 to pioneer the folk rock style over the following year.) According to music critic Tim Riley, Rubber Soul served as a "step toward a greater synthesis" of all the elements that throughout 1965 represented a "major rock 'n' roll explosion", rather than just the emergence of folk rock. Citing Dylan and the Rolling Stones as the Beatles' artistic peers during this period, he says that on Rubber Soul these two acts "inspire rather than influence their sound".

Two years after the start of Beatlemania, the band were open to exploring new themes in their music through a combination of their tiring of playing to audiences full of screaming fans, their commercial power, a shared curiosity gained through literature and experimentation with hallucinogenic drugs, and their interest in the potential of the recording studio. According to Ringo Starr, Rubber Soul was the Beatles' "departure record", written and recorded during a period when, largely through the influence of marijuana, "We were expanding in all areas of our lives, opening up to a lot of different attitudes." The album was especially reflective of John Lennon's maturation as a songwriter, as he was encouraged to address wider-ranging issues than before through Dylan's example. George Harrison's outlook had been transformed by his and Lennon's experiences with the hallucinogenic drug LSD; he said the drug had revealed to him the futility of the band's widespread fame by "open[ing] up this whole other consciousness".

Author Mark Prendergast recognises Rubber Soul as "the first Beatles record which was noticeably drug-influenced". Lennon called it "the pot album". Marijuana appealed to the band's bohemian ideal. Paul McCartney, who was the only Beatle still living in central London, said it was typical of a move away from alcohol and into "more of a beatnik scene, like jazz".

== Production ==
=== Recording history ===
Rubber Soul was a matter of having all experienced the recording studio, having grown musically as well, but [getting] the knowledge of the place, of the studio. We were more precise about making the album, that's all, and we took over the cover and everything.

— John Lennon

Recording for Rubber Soul began on 12 October 1965 at EMI Studios (now Abbey Road Studios) in London; final production and mix down took place on 15 November. During the sessions, the Beatles typically focused on fine-tuning the musical arrangement for each song, an approach that reflected the growing division between the band as a live act and their ambitions as recording artists. The album was one of the first projects that Martin undertook after leaving EMI's staff and co-founding Associated Independent Recording (AIR). Martin later described Rubber Soul as "the first album to present a new, growing Beatles to the world", adding: "For the first time we began to think of albums as art on their own, as complete entities." It was the final Beatles album that recording engineer Norman Smith worked on before being promoted by EMI to record producer. The sessions were held over thirteen days and totalled 113 hours, with a further seventeen hours (spread over six days) allowed for mixing.

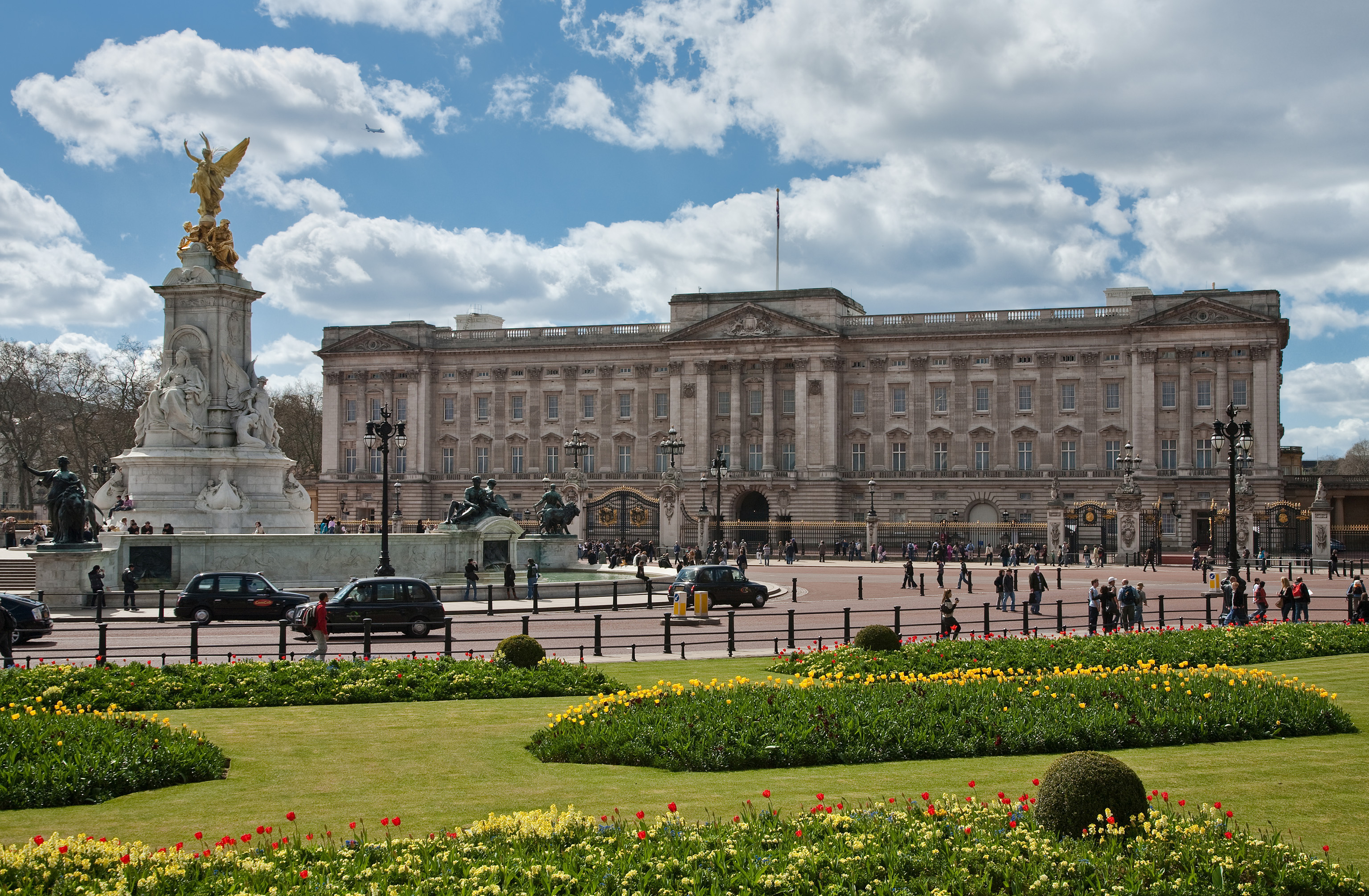
The Beatles interrupted the intensive recording for the album to receive their MBEs at Buckingham Palace.

The band were forced to work to a tight deadline to ensure the album was completed in time for a pre-Christmas release. They were nevertheless in the unfamiliar position of being able to dedicate themselves solely to a recording project, free of touring, filming and radio engagements. The Beatles ceded to two interruptions during this time. They received their MBEs at Buckingham Palace on 26 October, from Queen Elizabeth II, and on 1–2 November, the band filmed their segments for The Music of Lennon & McCartney, a Granada Television tribute to the Lennon–McCartney songwriting partnership. According to author Christopher Bray, this intensive recording made Rubber Soul not just unusual in the Beatles' career but "emphatically unlike those LPs made by other bands". From 4 November – by which point only around half the required number of songs were near completion – the Beatles' sessions were routinely booked to finish at 3 am each day.

After A Hard Day's Night in 1964, Rubber Soul was the second Beatles album to contain only original material. As the band's main writers, Lennon and McCartney struggled to complete enough songs for the project. After a session on 27 October was cancelled due to a lack of new material, Martin told a reporter that he and the group "hope to resume next week" but would not consider recording songs by any other composers. The Beatles completed "Wait" for the album, having taped its rhythm track during the sessions for Help! in June 1965. They also recorded the instrumental "12-Bar Original", a twelve-bar blues in the style of Booker T. & the M.G.'s. Credited to Lennon, McCartney, Harrison and Starr, it remained unreleased until 1996. (Note: The song appeared on the Anthology 2 outtakes compilation, edited down to under three minutes from its original length of 6:36.)

The group recorded "Day Tripper" and "We Can Work It Out" during the Rubber Soul sessions for release as a single accompanying the album. To avoid having to promote the single with numerous television appearances, the Beatles chose to produce film clips for the two songs, the first time they had done so for a single. Directed by Joe McGrath, the clips were filmed at Twickenham Film Studios in south-west London on 23 November.

=== Studio aesthetic and sounds ===
[On Rubber Soul] the Beatles demonstrated an ability to reach beyond the confines of acceptable rock and roll techniques and bring to the studio truly innovative ideas such as layering bass and fuzz-bass guitars, creating rhymes in different languages, mixing modes on a single song, utilizing tape manipulation to give instruments entirely new sounds, and introducing the sitar – a most unusual instrument for a rock band.

— Music journalist Chris Smith

Lennon recalled that Rubber Soul was the first album over which the Beatles took control in the studio and made demands rather than accept standard recording practices. According to Riley, the album reflects "a new affection for recording" over live performance. Author Philip Norman similarly writes that, with the Beatles increasingly drawn towards EMI's large cache of "exotic" musical instruments, combined with their readiness to incorporate "every possible resource of the studio itself" and Martin's skills as a classical arranger, "Implicitly, from the very start, this [music] was not stuff intended to be played live on stage."

According to Barry Miles, a leading figure in the UK underground whom Lennon and McCartney befriended at this time, Rubber Soul and its 1966 follow-up, Revolver, were "when [the Beatles] got away from George Martin, and became a creative entity unto themselves". In 1995, Harrison said that Rubber Soul was his favourite Beatles album, adding: "we certainly knew we were making a good album. We did spend more time on it and tried new things. But the most important thing about it was that we were suddenly hearing sounds that we weren't able to hear before."

During the sessions, McCartney played a solid-body Rickenbacker 4001 bass guitar, which produced a fuller sound than his hollow-body Hofner. The Rickenbacker's design allowed for greater melodic precision, a characteristic that led McCartney to contribute more intricate bass lines. For the rest of his Beatles career, the Rickenbacker would become McCartney's primary bass for studio work. Harrison used a Fender Stratocaster for the first time, such as on his lead guitar part on "Nowhere Man". The variety in guitar tones throughout the album was also aided by Harrison and Lennon's use of capos, such as in the high-register parts on "If I Needed Someone" and "Girl".

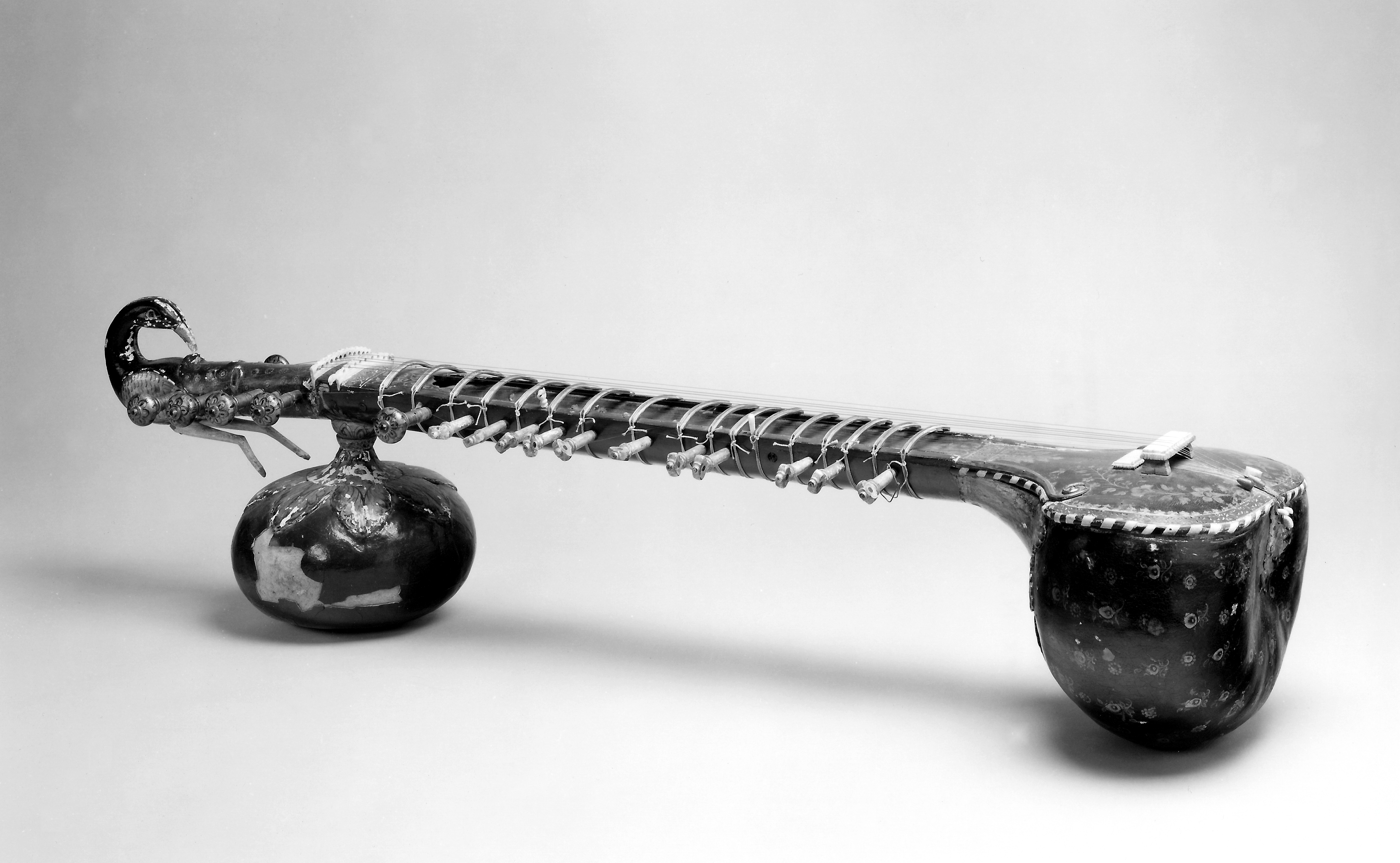
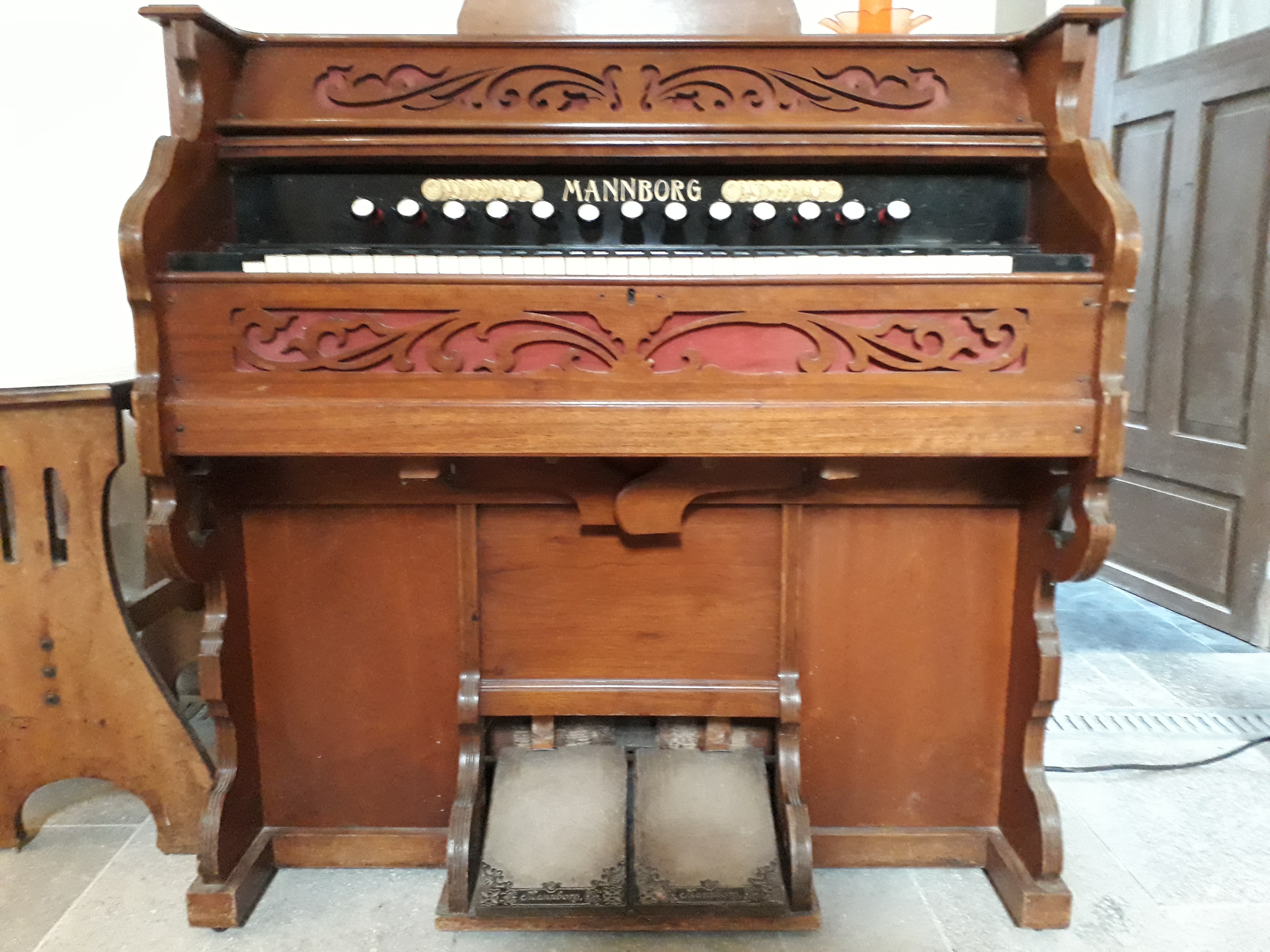
A sitar (top) and a Mannborg harmonium. Along with fuzz bass and varispeed-treated piano, these instruments were among the unusual sounds the band used for the first time during the Rubber Soul sessions.

On Rubber Soul, the Beatles departed from standard rock and roll instrumentation, particularly in Harrison's use of the Indian sitar on "Norwegian Wood". Having been introduced to the string instrument on the set of the 1965 film Help!, Harrison's interest was fuelled by fellow Indian music fans Roger McGuinn and David Crosby of the Byrds, partway through the Beatles' US tour. (Note: McGuinn later likened the exchange of ideas between British and American musicians during the mid 1960s to an "international code going back and forth through records".) Music journalist Paul Du Noyer describes the sitar part as "simply a sign of the whole band's hunger for new musical colours", but also "the pivotal moment of Rubber Soul". The Beatles also made use of harmonium during the sessions, marking that instrument's introduction into rock music.

The band's willingness to experiment with sound was further demonstrated in McCartney playing fuzz bass on "Think for Yourself" over his standard bass part, and their employing a piano made to sound like a baroque harpsichord on "In My Life". The latter effect came about when, in response to Lennon suggesting he play something "like Bach", Martin recorded the piano solo with the tape running at half-speed; when played back at normal speed, the sped-up sound gave the illusion of a harpsichord. In this way, the Beatles used the recording studio as a musical instrument, an approach that they and Martin developed further with Revolver. In Prendergast's description, "bright ethnic percussion" was among the other "great sounds" that filled the album.

Lennon, McCartney and Harrison's three-part harmony singing was another musical detail that came to typify the Rubber Soul sound. According to musicologist Walter Everett, some of the vocal arrangements feature the same "pantonal planing of three-part root-position triads" adopted by the Byrds, who had initially based their harmonies on the style used by the Beatles and other British Invasion bands. Riley says that the Beatles softened their music on Rubber Soul, yet by reverting to slower tempos they "draw attention to how much rhythm can do". Wide separation in the stereo image ensured that subtleties in the musical arrangements were heard; in Riley's description, this quality emphasised the "richly textured" arrangements over "everything being stirred together into one high-velocity mass". (Note: Everett comments on the significance of the band's interest in the harmonium, sitar and fuzz bass each occurring during the same period, pointing out that the three sounds overlap in their offering a wide vibrative quality and "more richly discordant" tones.)

McCartney said that as part of their increased involvement in the album's production, the band members attended the mixing sessions rather than let Martin work in their absence. Until late in their career, the "primary" version of the Beatles' albums was always the monophonic mix. According to Beatles historian Bruce Spizer, Martin and the EMI engineers devoted most of their time and attention to the mono mixdowns, and generally regarded stereo as a gimmick. The band were not usually present for the stereo mixing sessions.

=== Band dynamics ===
While Martin recalled the sessions as having been "a very joyful time", Smith felt "something had happened between Help! and Rubber Soul", and the family atmosphere that had once characterised the relationship between the Beatles and their production team was absent. He said the project revealed the first signs of artistic conflict between Lennon and McCartney, and friction within the band as more effort was spent on perfecting each song. (Note: McCartney began to insist that, when recording his compositions, the Beatles adhere to arrangements he had decided on in advance. Smith said that McCartney was frequently critical of Harrison's playing, foreshadowing a condescending attitude on McCartney's part that would lead to Starr temporarily leaving the band three years later.) This also manifested in a struggle over which song should be the A-side of their next single, with Lennon insisting on "Day Tripper" (of which he was the primary writer) and publicly contradicting EMI's announcement about the upcoming release.

In addition, a rift was growing between McCartney and his bandmates as he continued to abstain from taking LSD. The revelations provided by the drug had drawn Lennon and Harrison closer, and were then shared by Starr when, during the band's stay in Los Angeles that August, he agreed to try LSD for the first time.

== Songs ==
=== Overview ===
Pop historian Andrew Grant Jackson describes Rubber Soul as a "synthesis of folk, rock, soul, baroque, proto-psychedelia, and the sitar". According to author Joe Harrington, the album contained the Beatles' first "psychedelic experiments", heralding the transformational effect of LSD on many of the original British Invasion acts. Author Bernard Gendron dismisses the commonly held view that Rubber Soul is a folk rock album; he cites its incorporation of baroque and Eastern sounds as examples of the Beatles' "nascent experimentalism and eclectic power of appropriation", aspects that he says suggest an artistic approach that transcends the genre. (Note: In Gendron's view, "[The Beatles'] accreditory debt to Dylan and the folk rock movement was much less musical than it was discursive." He nevertheless sees Rubber Soul as the Beatles paying the "ultimate compliment" to the folk rock scene, which benefited from the band's "seal of approval".) According to The Encyclopedia of Country Music, building on the Beatles' 1964 track "I Don't Want to Spoil the Party", the album can be seen in retrospect as an early example of country rock, anticipating the Byrds' Sweetheart of the Rodeo album.

Further to Lennon's more introspective outlook in 1964, particularly on Beatles for Sale, the lyrics on Rubber Soul represent a pronounced development in sophistication, thoughtfulness and ambiguity. According to music critic Greil Marcus, "the Beatles were still writing about love, but this was a new kind of love: contingent, scary and vital", and so, while the music was "seduction, not assault", the "emotional touch" was tougher than before. Author James Decker considers it significant that Rubber Soul "took its narrative cues more from folk crossovers such as Bob Dylan and the Byrds than from the Beatles' pop cohorts". In particular, the relationships between the sexes moved from simpler boy-girl love songs to more nuanced and negative portrayals. In this way, Lennon and McCartney offered candid insights into their personal lives.

=== Side one ===
==== "Drive My Car" ====
"Drive My Car"
The chorus of "Drive My Car"

The album opens with a pair of lead guitar parts that are soon rendered off-metre by the arrival of McCartney's bass. "Drive My Car" is a McCartney composition but with substantial contribution by Lennon to the lyrics. Harrison, as the Beatles' most knowledgeable soul-music enthusiast, contributed heavily to the recording by suggesting they arrange the song with a dual guitar–bass riff in the style of Otis Redding's contemporary single "Respect". In their joint lead vocals, McCartney and Lennon sing dissonant harmonies, a quality that is furthered by Harrison's entrance and signifies what Everett terms a "new jazzy sophistication … in the vocal arrangement".

The lyrics convey an actress's desire to become a film star and her promise to the narrator that he can be her chauffeur. According to Riley, the song satirises the "ethics of materialism" and serves as a "parody of the Beatles' celebrity status and the status-seekers they meet". Author and critic Kenneth Womack describes the lyrics as being "loaded with sexual innuendo", and he says that the female protagonist challenged the gendered expectations of a mid-1960s pop audience, as an "everywoman" with ego and a clear agenda.

==== "Norwegian Wood (This Bird Has Flown)" ====
Lennon said he wrote "Norwegian Wood" about an extramarital affair and that he worded the narrative to hide the truth from his wife, Cynthia. The lyrics sketch a failed meeting between the singer and a mysterious girl, where she goes to bed and he sleeps in the bath; in retaliation at the girl's aloofness, the singer decides to burn down her pine-panelled home. (Note: According to music journalist Rob Sheffield, the lyrics are so cryptic that the listener is left wondering: "does he light up a joint at the end or burn the girl's house down?") Arranged in 12/8 time, and in the English folk style, the song has a Mixolydian melody that results in a drone effect in the acoustic guitars, complementing the sitar part, though switches to parallel scale of E Dorian during its middle eight. The narrative draws heavily on Dylan's style through its use of ambiguity. In author Jonathan Gould's description, the song is an "emotional black comedy", while Decker recognises it as a continuation of the "interrogation of sexual ambiguities" and "muddled sense of power" displayed in "Drive My Car".

==== "You Won't See Me" ====
Written by McCartney, "You Won't See Me" reflects the difficulties he was experiencing in his relationship with actress Jane Asher due to her refusal to put her acting career second to his needs. Gould identifies the song as the third consecutive track in which the narrative conveys miscommunication. McCartney described its music as "very Motown-flavored", with a "feel" inspired by Motown bassist James Jamerson. The verses use the same chord sequence as the Four Tops' hit "It's the Same Old Song", which was titled by its writers, the Holland–Dozier–Holland team, in acknowledgement that they had already used the same pattern in their composition "I Can't Help Myself".

==== "Nowhere Man" ====
"Nowhere Man"
Sample from "Nowhere Man"

Lennon recalled that "Nowhere Man" came to him fully formed one night at his home in Surrey, after he had struggled to write anything for several hours. The song reflects the existential concerns raised by his experiences with LSD, and, like "I'm a Loser" and "Help!", his self-loathing during a time he later called his "fat Elvis period". It was the first Beatles song to completely avoid boy–girl relationships, and through Lennon conveying his feelings of inadequacy in the third person, the first example of a literary character in the Beatles' work. Riley views the message as a precursor to the "I'd love to turn you on" theme of "A Day in the Life" and, aided by the band's performance, optimistic in tone as Lennon "sings for the unsung, the people who have shut themselves off from life".

Heavy equalisation was applied to the electric guitar parts through a series of faders, giving them a treble-rich texture that, as with the harmony vocals, recalls the Byrds' sound. In Prendergast's description, the track "burst[s] forth with all the gusto of newly discovered psychedelia", as Lennon's lead vocal "luxuriates in an opiated haze of production and Harrison's Fender Stratocaster solo fuzzes with all the right hallucinatory sparkle".

==== "Think for Yourself" ====
Harrison's lyrics to "Think for Yourself" suggest the influence of Dylan's September 1965 single "Positively 4th Street", as Harrison appears to rebuke a friend or lover. The song's accusatory message was unprecedented in the Beatles' work; Jackson identifies it as the band's contribution to a "subgenre" of protest songs that emerged in 1965, in which artists railed against "oppressive conformity itself" rather than political issues. Everett describes the composition as "a tour de force of altered scale degrees". He adds that, such is the ambiguity throughout, "its tonal quality forms the perfect conspirator with the text's and the rhythm's hesitations and unexpected turns." Gould writes that, in its dialogue with Harrison's vocal, McCartney's fuzz bass suggests "the snarls of an enraged schnauzer, snapping and striking at its lead".

==== "The Word" ====
["The Word" is] all about gettin' smart. It's the marijuana period ... it's the love-and-peace thing. The word is "love," right? It seems like the underlying theme to the universe. Everything that was worthwhile got down to this one, love, love thing.

— John Lennon

In his book 1965: The Year Modern Britain Was Born, Bray recognises "The Word" as marking the start of the Beatles' "high psychedelic period". Lennon's exhortation that "The word is love" anticipates the ethos behind the counterculture's 1967 Summer of Love. The lyrics focus on the concept of universal love as a path to spiritual enlightenment, with what Decker terms "proselytizing zeal" on the narrator's part. Author Ian MacDonald recognises the "distant influence" of Wilson Pickett's "In the Midnight Hour" and James Brown's "Papa's Got a Brand New Bag" on the song's rhythm, and highlights Starr's drumming (for its "feast of eccentric 'backwards fills'") and McCartney's dextrous bass playing. The arrangement also includes seven vocal parts and Martin playing suspended chords on harmonium.

==== "Michelle" ====
"Michelle" was conceived by McCartney in the late 1950s. During a writing session for Rubber Soul, Lennon added a new middle eight, part of which was taken from Nina Simone's recent cover of "I Put a Spell on You". MacDonald identifies the song as another example of the Beatles' "comedy song" approach, which, in a contemporary interview, McCartney had suggested was a possible new direction for the group. In Womack's view, the French phrases in the lyrics accentuate the premise whereby a language barrier separates two lovers, and the narrative conveys an acceptance that their relationship is doomed to fail, such that the singer is already looking back nostalgically at what could have been. Gould describes the performance as "sentimental … French cabaret" which, following McCartney's declaration of "I love you", leads into a guitar solo by Harrison that represents "one of Jean-Paul Sartre's existential café workers".

=== Side two ===
==== "What Goes On" ====
The Beatles had attempted to record an early version of Lennon's "What Goes On" in 1963. With little time to complete Rubber Soul, the song was reworked by Lennon and McCartney as a vocal spot for Starr, who also received his first songwriting credit, as co-composer. The song is in the country style favoured by Starr, and in its lyrics the singer laments his lover's deceit. In Everett's description, the arrangement includes Harrison's rockabilly-inflected lead guitar, played on his Gretsch Tennessean, contrasting with Lennon's "Steve Cropper-styled Memphis 'chick' rhythm part".

==== "Girl" ====
"Girl"
Sample from "Girl"

Lennon said he wrote "Girl" about an archetypal woman he had been searching for and would finally find in Yoko Ono, the Japanese artist he met in November 1966. In the lyrics, he also expresses his disdain for Christian moral values. The song was the final track recorded for the album. The composition incorporates aspects of Greek folk music, while the arrangement includes an instrumental passage set as a German two-step and an acoustic guitar part played to sound like a Greek bouzouki. (Note: According to Everett, the same bouzouki-like guitar sound was used by the Hollies in their June 1966 single "Bus Stop".) High equalisation was applied to Lennon's vocal over the choruses to capture the hissing sound as he drew breath – an effect that also suggested he was inhaling on a marijuana joint. McCartney recalled that he and Harrison sang "Tit-tit-tit" on the middle eights to capture the "innocence" of the Beach Boys singing "La-la-la" on one of their recent songs. Riley likens the musical arrangement to a "scene from the old world" and he concludes of the song: "The old-fashioned atmosphere conveys desire and deception, and Lennon sings it as much to console himself as to make sense of its bewildering proportions ('And she promises the earth to me and I believe her/After all this time I don't know why'). It's the sympathetic side of the anger in 'Norwegian Wood'."

==== "I'm Looking Through You" ====
Like "You Won't See Me" and "We Can Work It Out", "I'm Looking Through You" focuses on McCartney's troubled relationship with Asher. Gould describes it as the "disillusioned sequel" to McCartney's other 1965 songs centring on "a face-to-face (if not necessarily eye-to-eye) encounter between two lovers". Decker likens the lyrics to a less philosophical version of "Think for Yourself" in which "the narrator has grown, yet the woman has failed to keep up." The composition contrasts acoustic-based verses with harsher, R&B-style instrumental sections, suggesting a combination of the folk rock and soul styles. The Beatles had taped two versions of the song before achieving the final version, which they recorded during the last, frantic day of the Rubber Soul sessions. In its final form, the song gained a middle eight where previously there had been a twelve-bar blues jam. (Note: As released on Anthology 2, one of the earlier takes featured alternative instrumentation, such as classical guitars, and harmonium instead of Hammond organ.)

==== "In My Life" ====
"In My Life"
Sample from "In My Life", including a portion of the piano solo

Lennon credited a remark made by BBC journalist Kenneth Allsop, who had asked why his songs appeared to lack the wordplay and childhood focus evident in his 1964 book In His Own Write, as the catalyst for "In My Life". Lennon considered the song to be his "first real major piece of work". The lyrics evoke his youth in Liverpool and reflect his nostalgia for a time before the onset of international fame. McCartney recalled writing the melody on his own and said that the song's musical inspiration came from Smokey Robinson and the Miracles; according to Lennon, McCartney merely assisted in writing what he called "the middle-eight melody". In Gould's description, "In My Life" "owed a conscious debt" to the Miracles' contemporary hit "The Tracks of My Tears" and thereby served as "the most recent installment in the lively cultural exchange between Motown's Hitsville Studios and EMI's Abbey Road". (Note: Gould adds that, with "In My Life", Lennon "returned the compliment gratefully" after Robinson had based the lyrical theme of "The Tracks of My Tears" on two of his introspective songs from Beatles for Sale, "I Don't Want to Spoil the Party" and "I'm a Loser".)

Martin's Bach-inspired piano solo was overdubbed in the Beatles' absence, over a section that they had left empty. Womack says that the baroque aspect of this contribution furthers the song's nostalgic qualities, a point also made by Gould, who adds that, by revisiting the past and presenting emotional themes that are resolved in the narrative, "In My Life" serves as the album's only song that "sounds the Beatles' original ground theme of happiness-in-relationship".

==== "Wait" ====
"Wait" was a Lennon composition to which McCartney contributed a middle eight. Gould includes the song among a category of Beatles "'coming home' songs", while Riley pairs it with "It Won't Be Long" but adds that, relative to that 1963 song, in "Wait" "the lovers' reunion has more anxiety than euphoria goading the beat." The band completed the track on the final day of recording for the album, overdubbing tone-pedal lead guitar, percussion and a new vocal by McCartney onto the June 1965 rhythm track. MacDonald writes that, although Lennon and McCartney would most likely have viewed the subject matter as dated even in June, the group's performance gives the song the required "drive and character" for Rubber Soul, particularly Starr's approach to the rhythm changes between its contrasting sections.

==== "If I Needed Someone" ====
Harrison wrote "If I Needed Someone" as a love song to Pattie Boyd, the English model to whom he became engaged in December 1965 and married the following month. In the song's Rickenbacker 12-string guitar riff, the Beatles returned the compliment paid to them earlier in 1965 by the Byrds, whose jangly guitar-based sound McGuinn had sourced from Harrison's playing the previous year. In MacDonald's view, the song is influenced "far more" by Indian classical music than by the Byrds, through Harrison's partly Mixolydian melody and the presence of drone. The latter aspect is furthered by McCartney's arpeggiated bass line in A major continuing over the chord change to a ♭VII triad.

The detached, dispassionate tone in the lyrics has invited alternative interpretations. Gould refers to it as "a rueful rain check of a love song" directed to the "right person at the wrong time"; according to Jackson, "the lyrics address all the women of the world, saying that had he met them earlier [before committing to Boyd], it might have worked out, but now he was too much in love (but give me your number just in case)".

==== "Run for Your Life" ====
Lennon wrote "Run for Your Life" based on "Baby Let's Play House", which was one of Presley's early singles on the Sun record label. Lennon retained a line from the Presley track – "I'd rather see you dead, little girl, than to be with another man". The lyrical theme is jealousy, betraying an overtly misogynistic quality that Decker finds at odds with the Beatles' approach to making the album. (Note: According to Norman, at the time, the song "slipped unchallenged into a world not yet disturbed by feminism or concerns about domestic violence".) Performed in the country style, it was the first track recorded for the album and features a descending guitar riff played by Harrison and slide guitar parts.

=== North American format ===
Adhering to the company's policy for the Beatles' albums in the United States, Capitol Records altered the content of Rubber Soul for its release there. They removed "Drive My Car", "Nowhere Man", "What Goes On" and "If I Needed Someone", all of which were instead issued on the Beatles' next North American album, Yesterday and Today, in June 1966. The four songs were replaced with "I've Just Seen a Face" and "It's Only Love", which had been cut from Help! as part of Capitol's reconfiguring of that LP to serve as a true soundtrack album, consisting of Beatles songs and orchestral music from the film.

Through the mix of predominantly acoustic-based songs, according to Womack, the North American release "takes on a decidedly folk-ish orientation". Capitol sequenced "I've Just Seen a Face" as the opening track, reflecting the company's attempt to present Rubber Soul as a folk-rock album, and "It's Only Love" opened side two. (Note: Music journalist Rob Sheffield describes the Capitol version as a "folk-rock album more conceptually unified" than the Parlophone LP.) Gould writes that the omission of songs such as "Drive My Car" provided a "misleading idea" of the Beatles' musical direction and "turned the album title into an even more obscure joke", since the result was the band's least soul- or R&B-influenced album up to this point. The stereo mixes used by Capitol contained two false starts at the beginning of "I'm Looking Through You", while "The Word" also differed from the UK version due to the double-tracking of Lennon's lead vocal, the addition of an extra falsetto harmony and the panning treatment given to one of the percussion parts.

== Title and artwork ==
The album title was intended as a pun combining the falseness intrinsic to pop music and rubber-soled shoes. Lennon said the title was McCartney's idea and referred to "English soul". In a 1966 press conference, Starr said they called the album Rubber Soul to acknowledge that, in comparison to American soul artists, "we are white and haven't got what they've got", and he added that this was true of all the British acts who attempted to play soul music. McCartney recalled that he conceived the title after overhearing an American musician describing Mick Jagger's singing style as "plastic soul". (Note: McCartney used a similar phrase – "Plastic soul, man, plastic soul" – after the Beatles had completed the first take of "I'm Down", as released on the 1996 compilation Anthology 2.) In Phillip Norman's view, the title served as "a sly dig at their archrivals (and private best mates) the Rolling Stones", with the added implication that the Beatles' "variety" of soul music "at least was stamped out by a good strong northern [English] Wellington boot".

Rubber Soul was the group's first album not to feature their name on the cover, an omission that reflected the level of control they had over their releases and the extent of their international fame. (Note: Although the front cover of Beatles for Sale carried no artist credit, the band's name formed part of the album title, which was rendered in minuscule type compared with standard LP artwork of the time. The Beatles had first wanted an album cover free of any artist or title text with With the Beatles in 1963, but the idea was vetoed by EMI.) The cover photo of the Beatles was taken by photographer Robert Freeman in the garden at Lennon's house. The idea for the "stretched" effect of the image came about by accident when Freeman was projecting the photo onto an LP-size piece of cardboard for the Beatles' benefit, and the board fell slightly backwards, elongating the projected image. (Note: McCartney recalled the band's reaction: "That's it, Rubber So-o-oul, hey hey! Can you do it like that?") Harrison said the effect was appropriate since it allowed the group to lose "the 'little innocents' tag, the naivety" and it was in keeping with their emergence as "fully fledged potheads". Author Peter Doggett highlights the cover as an example of the Beatles, like Dylan and the Stones, "continu[ing] to test the limits of the portrait" in their LP designs.

The distinctive lettering was created by illustrator Charles Front, who recalled that his inspiration was the album's title: "If you tap into a rubber tree then you get a sort of globule, so I started thinking of creating a shape that represented that, starting narrow and filling out." The rounded letters used on the sleeve established a style that became ubiquitous in psychedelic designs and, according to journalist Lisa Bachelor, "a staple of poster art for the flower power generation".

== Release ==
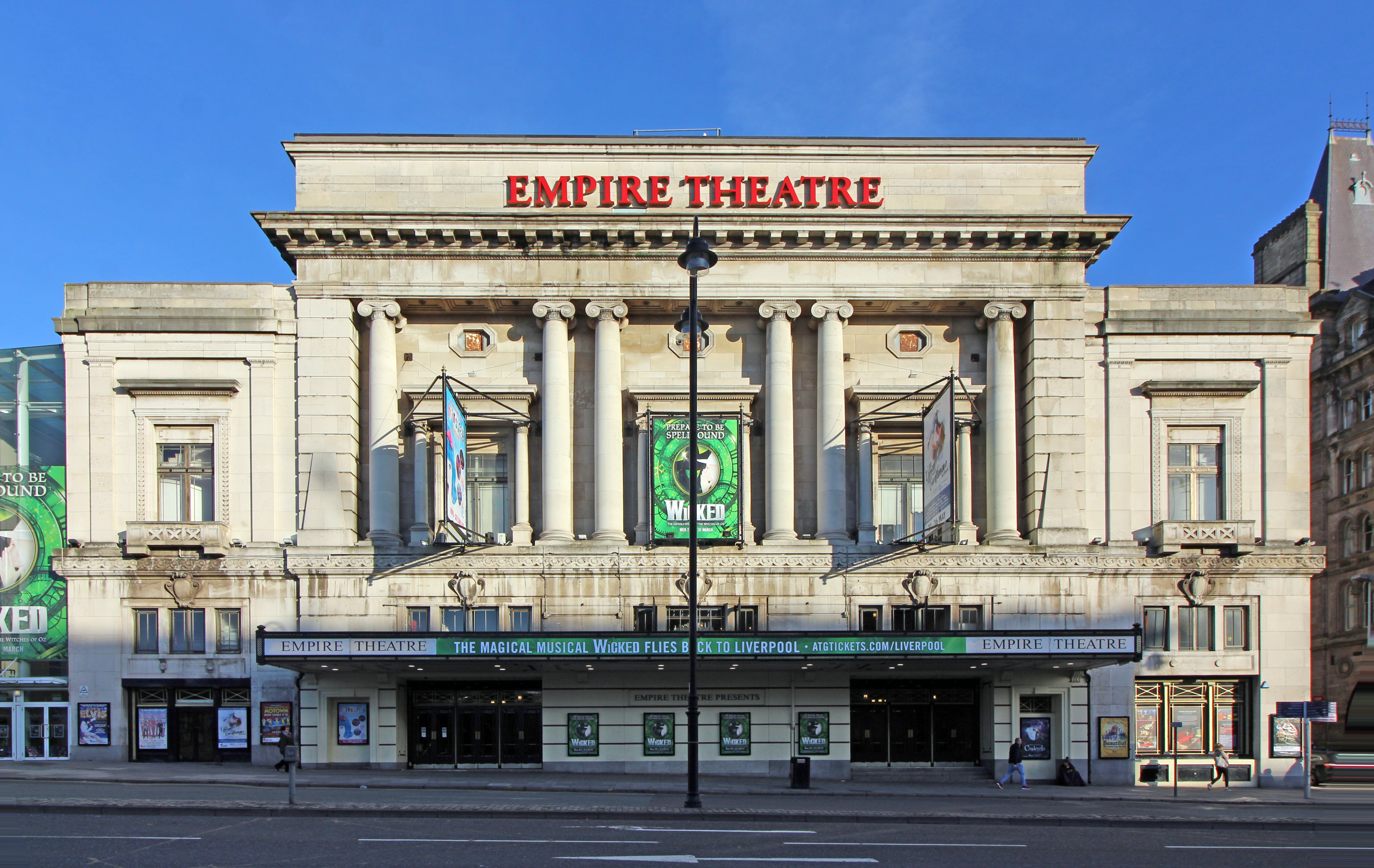
The Beatles performed at the Liverpool Empire during their December 1965 UK tour. The shows there marked the group's final concerts in their home town.

EMI's Parlophone label issued Rubber Soul on 3 December 1965. The "We Can Work It Out" / "Day Tripper" single was also released that day and was the first example of a double A-side single in Britain. EMI announced that it had pressed 750,000 copies of the LP to cater to local demand. Its advance orders of 500,000 almost equalled the total sales for the new single and were described by the Daily Mirror's show business reporter as marking a new record for pre-release orders for an LP.

On the day of the album's release, the Beatles performed at the Odeon Cinema in Glasgow, marking the start of what would be their final UK tour. Weary of Beatlemania, the group had conceded to do a short tour, although they refused to reprise their Christmas Show from the 1963–64 and 1964–65 holiday seasons. They performed both sides of the single throughout the tour, but only "If I Needed Someone" and "Nowhere Man" from the new album. In the United States, Rubber Soul was their tenth album and their first to consist entirely of original songs. The release took place there on 6 December.

For most American teens, the arrival of the Beatles' "Rubber Soul" ... was unsettling. Instead of cheerleading for love, the album's songs held cryptic messages about thinking for yourself, the hypnotic power of women, something called "getting high" and bedding down with the opposite sex. Clearly, growing up wasn't going to be easy.

— Historian Marc Myers

In an interview following the album's release, McCartney said that although people had "always wanted us to stay the same", he saw no reason for the Beatles to pander to such limitations, adding, "Rubber Soul for me is the beginning of my adult life." Lennon commented, "You don't know us if you don't know Rubber Soul."

According to Beatles biographer Nicholas Schaffner, Freeman's cover photo was viewed as "daringly surreal" and led some fans to write to the band's official fanzine, Beatles Monthly, alarmed that the image "made their heroes look like corpses". In her study of the Beatles' contemporary audience, sociologist Candy Leonard writes that some young listeners were challenged by the band's new musical direction, but "With Rubber Soul, the Beatles came to occupy a role in fans' lives and a place in their psyches that was different from any previous fan–performer relationship." Singer-songwriter Elvis Costello, who was an eleven-year-old fan at the time, later recalled thinking that the band had "lost their minds". He added: "I didn't understand a word, I didn't think it was any good, and then six weeks later you couldn't live without the record. And that's good – that's when you trust the people who make music to take you somewhere you haven't been before."

== Commercial performance ==
Rubber Soul began its 42-week run on the Record Retailer LPs chart (subsequently adopted as the UK Albums Chart) on 12 December 1965. The following week it replaced the Sound of Music soundtrack at the top of the chart, where it remained for eight weeks in total. On the national chart compiled by Melody Maker, Rubber Soul entered at number 1 and held the position for thirteen weeks; it remained in the top ten until mid July 1966. (Note: Rubber Soul returned to the UK listings in May 1987, peaking at number 60. Among several chart appearances since then, the album reached number 10 in September 2009.) In the United States, Rubber Soul topped the Billboard Top LPs chart on 8 January 1966, having sold 1.2 million copies there within nine days of release. These initial sales were unprecedented for an LP and were cited by Billboard magazine as evidence of a new market trend in the US in which pop albums started to match the numbers of singles sold. The album was number 1 for six weeks in total; it remained in the top twenty until the start of July, before leaving the chart in mid December. As the more popular of the joint A-sides, "We Can Work It Out" became the Beatles' sixth consecutive number 1 on the Billboard Hot 100 chart, all of which were achieved over a twelve-month period from January 1965. (Note: Jackson cites this run of success as evidence that the Beatles "loomed over their era like possibly no other artist has since", adding that the six hit singles captured the nation's "shifting mood" throughout 1965.)

While British albums typically avoided including previously released songs, the lack of a hit single on the North American version of Rubber Soul added to the album's identity there as a self-contained artistic statement. Everett writes that in the US the album's "hit" was "Michelle", through its popularity on radio playlists. After their inclusion on the EMI-format LP, "Norwegian Wood", "Nowhere Man" and "Michelle" were each issued as singles in various markets outside Britain and America, with "Norwegian Wood" topping the Australian chart in May 1966. "Nowhere Man"'s first release in North America was as a single A-side, backed by "What Goes On", in February, before both tracks appeared on Yesterday and Today. "Nowhere Man" topped Record World's singles chart in the US and Canada's RPM 100 chart, but peaked at number 3 on the Billboard Hot 100. (Note: With reference to the mass appeal of "Michelle", Everett comments that McCartney's song proved more popular than "Nowhere Man" on the radio playlist compiled by WABC in New York, where it outlasted the official single by a week. In reaction to a similar preference for the song from disc jockeys across America, Capitol added a yellow promotional sticker onto the LP cover saying "HEAR PAUL SING 'MICHELLE.'") In July, Parlophone released an EP titled Nowhere Man, which contained "Nowhere Man", "Michelle" and two other songs from Rubber Soul.

The album was also the source of hit songs for several other contemporary artists. "Michelle" became one of the most widely recorded of all the Beatles' songs. Cover versions of "Girl", "If I Needed Someone" and "Nowhere Man" similarly placed on UK or US singles charts in 1966.

In the UK, Rubber Soul was the third highest-selling album of 1965, behind The Sound of Music and Beatles for Sale, and the third highest-selling album of 1966, behind The Sound of Music and Revolver. The extent of its commercial success there surprised the music industry, which had sought to re-establish the LP market as the domain of adult record-buyers. From early 1966, record companies in the UK ceased their policy of promoting adult-oriented entertainers over rock acts, and embraced budget albums for their lower-selling artists to cater to the increased demand for LPs. In the US, Rubber Soul was the fourth highest-selling album of 1966, as reported in Billboard. According to figures published in 2009 by former Capitol executive David Kronemyer, further to estimates he gave in MuseWire magazine, Rubber Soul sold 1,800,376 copies in America by the end of 1965 and 2,766,862 by the close of the decade. As of 1997, it had shipped over 6 million copies there. In 2013, after the British Phonographic Industry altered its sales award protocol, the album was certified Platinum based on UK sales since 1994.

== Critical reception ==
=== Contemporary reviews ===
Critical response to Rubber Soul was highly favourable. Allen Evans of the NME wrote that the band were "still finding different ways to make us enjoy listening to them" and described the LP as "a fine piece of recording artistry and adventure in group sound". While outlining to American readers the differences in the UK-format release, KRLA Beat said Rubber Soul was an "unbelievably sensational" work on which the Beatles were "once again ... setting trends in this world of pop". Newsweek lauded the Beatles as "the Bards of Pop", saying that the album's combination of "gospel, country, baroque counterpoint and even French popular ballads" lent the band a unique style in which their songs were "as brilliantly original as any written today". Like Newsweek, The New York Times had belittled the group when they first performed in America in February 1964, but following the release of Rubber Soul, entertainment critic Jack Gould wrote an effusive tribute in the newspaper's Sunday magazine. In HiFi/Stereo Review, Morgan Ames wrote that, like other supportive professional musicians, he recognised the devices the band employed as "they tromp on the art of music", and while he viewed their formal musicality as limited, he expressed joy at its effectiveness. Having opened the review by saying, "The Beatles sound more and more like music", he concluded of the album: "Their blend is excellent, their performance smooth, and their charm, wit and excitement run high."

The writers of Record Mirror's initial review found the LP lacking some of the variety of the group's previous releases but also said: "one marvels and wonders at the constant stream of melodic ingenuity stemming from the boys, both as performers and composers. Keeping up their pace of creativeness is quite fantastic." By contrast, Richard Green wrote in the same magazine that most of the album "if recorded by anyone but the Beatles, would not be worthy of release", with many of the tracks devoid of "the old Beatles excitement and compulsiveness". Green acknowledged that his was an unpopular opinion, before stating: "Judging LPs strictly on their merits, recent albums from Manfred Mann, the Beach Boys and Jerry Lee Lewis rank high above Rubber Soul."

In another review that Richard Williams later cited as an example of the British pop press not being "quite ready" for the album, Melody Maker found the Beatles' new sound "a little subdued" and said that tracks such as "You Won't See Me" and "Nowhere Man" "almost get monotonous – an un-Beatle-like feature if ever there was one". Author Steve Turner also highlights the comments made by the Melody Maker and Record Mirror reviewers, who were typically aged over 30, as indicative of how UK pop journalists lacked "the critical vocabulary" and "the broad musical perspective" to recognise or engage with progressive music. Turner adds that Rubber Soul "may have perplexed the old guard of entertainment correspondents, but it was a beacon for fledgling rock critics (as they would soon be called)". Among the few newspaper columnists seriously reviewing rock music was Ralph J. Gleason, jazz critic for the San Francisco Chronicle, who credited Rubber Soul with "experimenting far past the style of outright imitations of Negro rhythm and blues artists" which had often characterised the Beatles' earlier work. In a February 1966 article, he contended it was "one of the most universally appealing albums ever issued", extending the band's reach beyond teenagers to "[a]ll ages, all colors, all sexes, [and] all social and economic levels".

In a September 1966 review of Revolver, KRLA Beat said that the title of Rubber Soul had "become a standard phrase used to describe a creation of exceptional excellence in the field of music", such that several highly regarded releases had since earned the description "a 'Rubber Soul in its field'". (Note: KRLA's radio documentary series Pop Chronicles, which aired from 1969, dubbed this "renaissance" in music "the Rubberization of Soul".) Writing in Esquire in 1967, Robert Christgau called it "an album that for innovation, tightness, and lyrical intelligence was about twice as good as anything they or anyone else (except maybe the Stones) had done previously".

=== Retrospective assessment ===
Professional ratings
Review scores
Source	Rating
AllMusic	5/5 stars
Blender	5/5 stars
Consequence of Sound	A+
The Daily Telegraph	5/5 stars
Encyclopedia of Popular Music	5/5 stars
MusicHound Rock	4/5
Paste	97/100
Pitchfork	10/10
Q	5/5 stars
The Rolling Stone Album Guide	5/5 stars

According to Decker, notwithstanding the band's advances in 1964, music critics generally view Rubber Soul as the Beatles' "'transitional' album ... from successful pop act to unparalleled masters of the studio". It is frequently cited by commentators as the first of their "classic" albums. Greil Marcus described it as the best of all the band's LPs. In his 1979 essay on the Beatles in The Rolling Stone Illustrated History of Rock & Roll, Marcus wrote: "Rubber Soul was an album made as an album; with the exception of 'Michelle' (which, to be fair, paid the bills for years to come), every cut was an inspiration, something new and remarkable in and of itself." (Note: Marcus also said that it was this album focus that nullified any potential argument "that the Beatles' first four LPs, in their British configurations (Please Please Me, With the Beatles, A Hard Day's Night and Beatles for Sale), were as good as Rubber Soul".)

Neil McCormick of The Daily Telegraph wrote in 2009: "this is where things start to get very interesting ... Rubber Soul is the result of their first extended period in the studio. The production is open and spacious, adorned but not yet overcrowded with new instruments and ideas. The songs themselves are like little Pop Art vignettes, where the lyrics are starting to match the quality of the melodies and arrangements." Scott Plagenhoef of Pitchfork describes the album as "the most important artistic leap in the Beatles' career – the signpost that signaled a shift away from Beatlemania and the heavy demands of teen pop, toward more introspective, adult subject matter". Paul Du Noyer wrote in his review for Blender in 2004: "Their talent was already a source of wonder, but now the songs themselves were turning mysterious. Under the influence of Bob Dylan – and, it might be said, marijuana – the Fab Four laced their tunefulness with new introspection, wordplay and social comment. University professors and newspaper columnists started taking note."

Writing in Paste, Mark Kemp says that the influence of Dylan and the Byrds seems overt at times but the album marks the start of the Beatles' peak in creativity and, in the context of 1965, offered "an unprecedented synthesis of elements from folk-rock and beyond". According to Richie Unterberger of AllMusic, the album's lyrics represented "a quantum leap in terms of thoughtfulness, maturity, and complex ambiguities", while the music was similarly progressive in its use of sounds beyond "the conventional instrumental parameters of the rock group". He adds that Rubber Soul is "full of great tunes" from Lennon and McCartney notwithstanding their divergence from a common style, and demonstrates that Harrison "was also developing into a fine songwriter". Writing in the Encyclopedia of Popular Music, Colin Larkin describes it as "not a collection of would-be hits or favourite cover versions ... but a startlingly diverse collection, ranging from the pointed satire of 'Nowhere Man' to the intensely reflective 'In My Life'." In the 2004 edition of The Rolling Stone Album Guide, Rob Sheffield recognises Help! as "the first chapter in the [Beatles'] astounding creative takeoff", after which the band "grew up with an album of bittersweet romance, singing adult love ballads that feel worldly but not jaded".

In an article coinciding with the 50th anniversary of its release, for The Guardian, Bob Stanley lamented that Rubber Soul was often overlooked in appraisals of the Beatles' recording career, whereas Revolver and The Beatles had each gained in stature to surpass Sgt. Pepper. Stanley highlighted Rubber Soul as having been "a good 18 months ahead of its time" and "the first album of the rock era that sounded like an album". Also writing in December 2015, in Rolling Stone, Sheffield especially admired the singing and the modern qualities of the female characters depicted in the lyrics. He said that the album was "way ahead of what anyone had done before" and, given the short period in which they had to record, he called it the Beatles' "accidental masterpiece".

Conversely, Jon Friedman of Esquire finds the work vastly overrated, with only the Lennon-dominated songs "Norwegian Wood", "Nowhere Man", "In My Life" and "Girl" worthy of praise, and he dismisses it as "dull" and "the Beatles' most inconsequential album". Although he considers that McCartney "comes off third-string" to Lennon and Harrison, Plagenhoef defends the album's subtle mood; highlighting the influence of cannabis on the Beatles throughout 1965, he writes: "With its patient pace and languid tones, Rubber Soul is an altogether much more mellow record than anything the Beatles had done before, or would do again. It's a fitting product from a quartet just beginning to explore their inner selves on record." In his review for Rough Guides, Chris Ingham highlights the musical arrangements, three-part harmonies and judicious use of new sounds, in addition to the band's improved musicianship and songwriting. He says that Rubber Soul usually trails the Beatles' next four albums in critics' assessments of their work, yet "it's undoubtedly their pre-acid, pre-antagonism masterpiece: beat music as high art". (Note: In 2020, when asked of which Beatles albums qualified for an A-plus grade, Christgau considered Rubber Soul as a "prime candidate" among scholars of the band, but concluded that, "while I feel and understand the artistic skill and historical momentousness ... in fact I only cream for three of its songs: 'Norwegian Wood', 'Girl', and 'In My Life'.")

== Influence and legacy ==
=== Rivals' response ===
It was the most out-there music they'd ever made, but also their warmest, friendliest and most emotionally direct. As soon as it dropped in December 1965, Rubber Soul cut the story of pop music in half – we're all living in the future this album invented. Now as then, every pop artist wants to make a Rubber Soul of their own.

— Rob Sheffield, 2015

Music historian Bill Martin says that the release of Rubber Soul was a "turning point" for pop music, in that for the first time "the album rather than the song became the basic unit of artistic production." In author David Howard's description, "pop's stakes had been raised into the stratosphere" by Rubber Soul, resulting in a shift in focus from singles to creating albums without the usual filler tracks. The release marked the start of a period when other artists, in an attempt to emulate the Beatles' achievement, sought to create albums as works of artistic merit and with increasingly novel sounds. According to Steve Turner, by galvanising the Beatles' most ambitious rivals in Britain and America, Rubber Soul launched "the pop equivalent of an arms race".

Brian Wilson of the Beach Boys described Rubber Soul as "the first album I listened to where every song was a gas" and planned his band's next project, Pet Sounds, as an attempt to surpass it. Rubber Soul similarly inspired Pete Townshend of the Who and the Kinks' Ray Davies, as well as Jagger and Keith Richards of the Rolling Stones, who issued their first album of all-original material, Aftermath, in April 1966. The album was also an influence on Bob Dylan, Stevie Wonder and the Byrds. John Cale recalled that Rubber Soul was an inspiration as he and Lou Reed developed their band the Velvet Underground. He said it was the first time "you were forced to deal with them as something other than a flash in the pan" and especially admired Harrison's introduction of Indian sounds.

In his chapter on Rubber Soul in the Cambridge Companion to Music's volume on the Beatles, James Decker credits the album with effecting the "transformation" of 1960s pop. In addition to citing it as the precedent for early experimental works by bands including the Kinks, Love and Jefferson Airplane, Decker writes that Rubber Soul presented "a variety of techniques hitherto unexplored in popular music" while encouraging listeners "to be cognizant of more flexible dimensions of pop music and to desire and expect them as well". Music historian Simon Philo also sees it as heralding the experimentation that characterised late-1960s rock. He describes it as an album-length confirmation of the "transformation of pop's range and reach" that the Beatles had first achieved when "Yesterday", McCartney's introspective and classically orchestrated ballad, topped US singles charts in late 1965. In a 1968 article on the Beach Boys, Gene Sculatti of Jazz & Pop recognised Rubber Soul as the model for Pet Sounds and Aftermath, as well as "the necessary prototype that no major rock group has been able to ignore". (Note: Du Noyer comments that the Beatles' contemporaries from their pre-fame years playing at the Cavern in Liverpool, such as the Searchers and Gerry Marsden, faded as a result of their ignoring the changes presented by Rubber Soul. He adds: "Some went cabaret and Cilla Black became the new Vera Lynn.")

=== Cultural legitimisation of pop music ===
Rubber Soul is widely viewed as the first pop album to make an artistic statement through the quality of its songs, a point that was reinforced by its artsy cover photo. The belated acceptance of the Beatles by the editors of Newsweek was indicative of the magazine's recognition of the band's popularity among American intellectuals and the cultural elite. This in turn was reflected in The Village Voice's appointment of Richard Goldstein, a recent graduate and New Journalism writer, to the new position of rock critic, in June 1966, and the Beatles' central role in achieving cultural legitimisation for pop music over 1966–67. (Note: In Gendron's description, one of two substantial early pieces by Goldstein was a laudatory assessment of Revolver that represented "the first substantial rock review devoted to one album to appear in any nonrock magazine with accreditory power". In the review, Goldstein referred to Rubber Soul as being "as important to the expansion of pop territory" as the "revolutionary" Revolver through its popularising of "baroque progression and Oriental instrumentation".) Referring to the praise afforded the band, particularly the Lennon–McCartney partnership, by Newsweek in early 1966, Michael Frontani writes: "The Beatles had a foothold in the world of art; in the months that followed, their efforts would lead to the full acceptance and legitimization of rock and roll as an art form."

Paul Williams launched Crawdaddy! in February 1966 with the aim of reflecting the sophistication brought to the genre by Rubber Soul and Dylan's Bringing It All Back Home – the two albums that, in music journalist Barney Hoskyns' description, "arguably gave birth to 'rock' as a more solid concept than 'pop'". According to Sculatti, Rubber Soul was "the definitive 'rock as art' album, revolutionary in that it was a completely successful creative endeavor integrating with precision all aspects of the creative (rock) process – composition of individual tracks done with extreme care, each track arranged appropriately to fit beside each other track, the symmetrical rock 'n' roll album". Christopher Bray describes it as "the album that proved that rock and roll could be suitable for adult audiences", "the first long-playing pop record to really merit the term 'album'" and the LP that "turned pop music into high art". Historian Marc Myers similarly credits it with "mark[ing] rock's shift from formulaic pop to studio experimentation and high art".

According to Du Noyer, through Rubber Soul's blurring of the traditionally distinct dividing line between pop and high culture, and the perceived inferiority of singles, "a rift occurred [in the UK] between pop and rock". He quotes writer Nik Cohn's complaints that the "danger signs" for pop music's loss of innocence were apparent on Rubber Soul, and poet Philip Larkin's comment that "[The Beatles'] fans stayed with them, and the nuttier intelligentsia, but they lost the typists in the Cavern." Du Noyer says the album started a process that grew to become a "gulf between albums and singles, between rock or pop" that "shape[d] British music for decades".

=== Development of subgenres ===
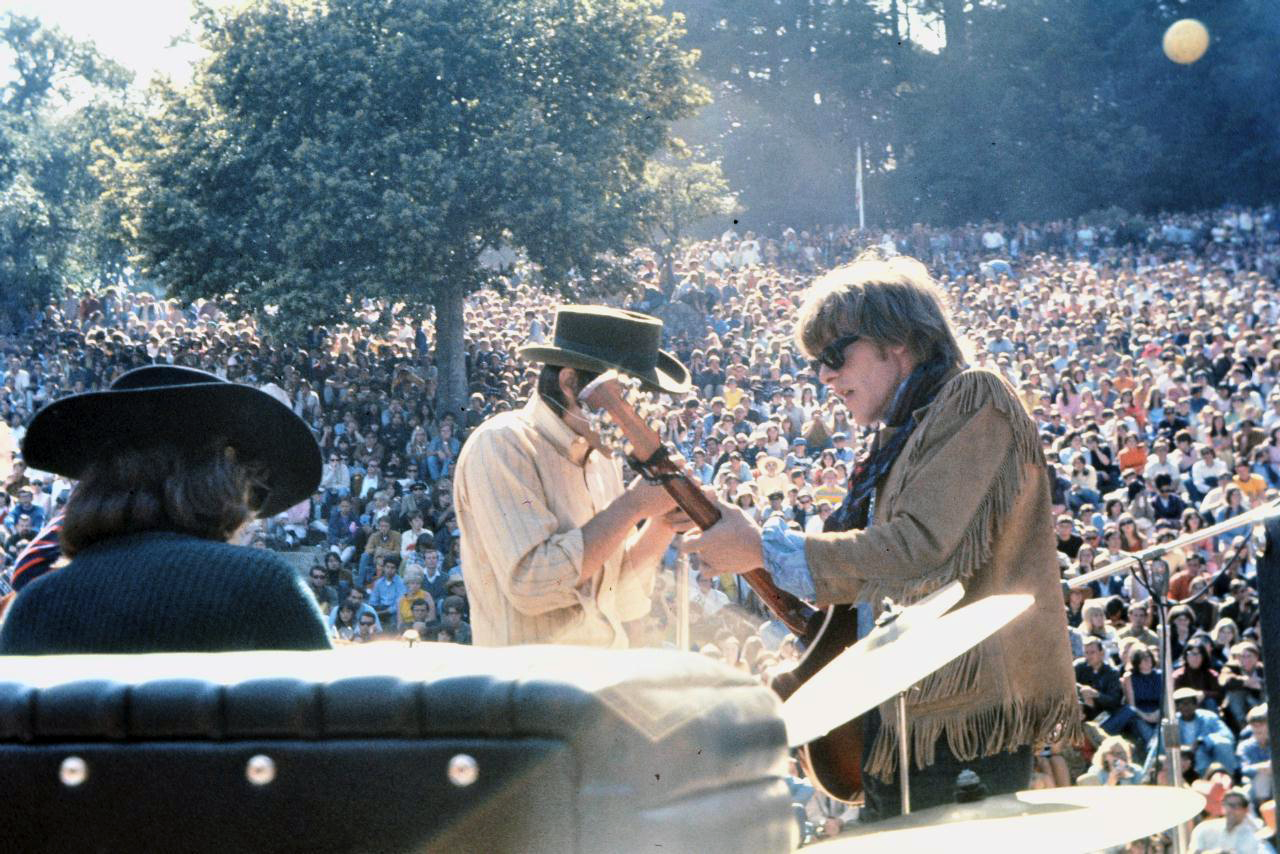
Jefferson Airplane performing in June 1967. Rubber Soul especially resonated with musicians in the emerging San Francisco scene.

The album coincided with rock 'n' roll's development into a variety of new styles, a process in which the Beatles' influence ensured them a pre-eminent role. Andrew Loog Oldham, the Rolling Stones' manager and producer at the time, has described Rubber Soul as "the album that changed the musical world we lived in then to the one we still live in today". (Note: Stevie Winwood, who formed the psychedelic rock band Traffic in 1967, sees Rubber Soul as the LP that "broke everything open", in that "It crossed music into a whole new dimension and was responsible for kicking off the sixties rock era.") "Norwegian Wood" launched what Indian classical musician Ravi Shankar called "the great sitar explosion", as the Indian string instrument became a popular feature in raga rock and for many pop artists seeking to add an exotic quality to their music. The harpsichord-like solo on "In My Life" led to a wave of baroque rock recordings. Rubber Soul was also the release that encouraged many folk-music aficionados to embrace pop. Folk singer Roy Harper recalled: "They'd come onto my turf, got there before me, and they were kings of it, overnight. We'd all been outflanked ..." (Note: Harper also said: "After a few times on the turntable, you realised that the goal posts had been moved, forever, and you really wanted to hear the next record – now. You could sense Revolver just over the horizon. You were hooked.")

Author George Case, writing in his book Out of Our Heads, identifies Rubber Soul as "the authentic beginning of the psychedelic era". Music journalist Mark Ellen similarly credits the album with having "sow[ed] the seeds of psychedelia", while Christgau says that "psychedelia starts here." (Note: According to Christgau, the album also "smashed a lot of alienation", in that "Without reneging on the group's mass cult appeal, it reached into private lives and made hundreds of thousands of secretly lonely people feel as if someone out there shared their brightest insights and most depressing discoveries.") Writing in The Sydney Morning Herald in July 1966, Lillian Roxon reported on the new trend for psychedelia-themed clubs and events in the US and said that Rubber Soul was "the classic psychedelic album now played at all the psychedelic discotheques". She attributed pop's recent embrace of psychedelia and "many of the strange new sounds now in records" to the LP's influence.

In Myers' view, the Capitol release "changed the direction of American rock". In the ongoing process of reciprocal influence between the band and US folk rock acts, the Beatles went on to inspire the San Francisco music scene. Recalling the album's popularity in the Haight-Ashbury district of San Francisco, where Jefferson Airplane were based, journalist Charles Perry said: "You could party hop all night and hear nothing but Rubber Soul." Perry also wrote that "More than ever the Beatles were the soundtrack of the Haight-Ashbury, Berkeley and the whole circuit", where pre-hippie students suspected that the album was inspired by drugs.

Citing a quantitative study of tempos in music from the 1960s, Walter Everett identifies Rubber Soul as a work that was "made more to be thought about than danced to", and an album that "began a far-reaching trend" in its slowing-down of the tempos typically used in pop and rock music. While music historians typically credit Sgt. Pepper as the birth of progressive rock, Everett and Bill Martin recognise Rubber Soul as the inspiration for many of the bands working in that genre from the early 1970s. (Note: As with Revolver, Everett sees the album as prefiguring progressive rock with its combination of "rich multipart vocals brimming with expressive dissonance treatment, a deep exploration of different guitars and the capos that produced different colors from familiar finger patterns, surprising new timbres and electronic effects, a more soulful pentatonic approach to vocal and instrumental melody tinged by frequent twelve-bar jams that accompanied the more serious recording, and a fairly consistent search for meaningful ideas in lyrics".)

=== Appearances on best-album lists and further recognition ===
Rubber Soul was voted fifth in Paul Gambaccini's 1978 book Critic's Choice: Top 200 Albums, based on submissions from a panel of 47 critics and broadcasters including Richard Williams, Christgau and Marcus. In the first edition of Colin Larkin's book All Time Top 1000 Albums, in 1994, it was ranked at number 10, and in 1998 it was voted the 39th greatest album of all time in the first "Music of the Millennium" poll, conducted by HMV and Channel 4. It was listed at number 34 in the third edition of Larkin's All Time Top 1000 Albums, published in 2000.

Since 2001, Rubber Soul has appeared in critics' best-albums-of-all-time lists compiled by VH1 (at number 6), Mojo (number 27) and Rolling Stone (number 5). It was among Time magazine's selection of the "All-Time 100 Albums" in 2006 and was favoured over Revolver in Chris Smith's book 101 Albums That Changed Popular Music three years later. In 2012, Rolling Stone again placed it at number 5 on the magazine's revised list of the "500 Greatest Albums of All Time". In September 2020, Rubber Soul was ranked at number 35 on the same publication's new list.

Rubber Soul appeared in Rolling Stone's 2014 list of the "40 Most Groundbreaking Albums of All Time", where the editors concluded: "You can say this represents 'maturity,' call it 'art' or credit it for moving rock away from singles to album-length statements – but regardless Rubber Soul accelerated popular music's creative arms race, driving competitors like the Stones, the Beach Boys and Dylan to dismantle expectations and create new ones." Three years later, Pitchfork ranked it at number 46 on the website's "200 Best Albums of the 1960s". In his commentary with the entry, Ian Cohen wrote: "Every Beatles album fundamentally shaped how pop music is understood, so Rubber Soul is one of the most important records ever made, by default ... Even in 2017, whenever a pop singer makes a serious turn, or an anointed serious band says they've learned to embrace pop, Rubber Soul can't help but enter the conversation."

In 2000, Rubber Soul was inducted into the Grammy Hall of Fame, an award bestowed by the American Recording Academy "to honor recordings of lasting qualitative or historical significance that are at least 25 years old". The album has been the subject of multi-artist tribute albums such as This Bird Has Flown and Rubber Folk. Writing in December 2015, Ilan Mochari of Inc. magazine commented on the unusual aspect of a pop album's 50th anniversary being celebrated, and added: "Over the next several years, you can bet you'll read about the 50th anniversary of many other albums – thematic volumes composed by bands or songwriters in the tradition Rubber Soul established. All of which is to say: Rubber Soul, the Beatles' sixth studio album, was the record that launched a thousand ships."

== Compact disc reissues ==
Rubber Soul was first released on compact disc on 30 April 1987, with the fourteen-song UK track line-up now the international standard. As with Help!, the album features a contemporary stereo digital remix prepared by George Martin. Martin had expressed concern to EMI over the original 1965 stereo mix, claiming it sounded "very woolly, and not at all what I thought should be a good issue". He went back to the original four-track tapes and remixed them for stereo.

A newly remastered version of Rubber Soul, again using the 1987 Martin remix, was released worldwide as part of the reissue of the entire Beatles catalogue on 9 September 2009. The album is available both as an individual CD release and as part of the Beatles (The Original Studio Recordings) box set. The accompanying Beatles in Mono box set contains two versions of the album: the original mono mix and the 1965 stereo mix.

The Capitol version was re-released in 2006, first as part of the Capitol Albums, Volume 2 box set, using original mixes of the Capitol album, and then in 2014, individually and in the box set The U.S. Albums. The album was reissued on compact disc and vinyl in both original releases as a part of the Rubber Soul: Special Edition box set, released on 2 October 2026.

== Track listing ==
=== In all markets except North America ===
All tracks are written by Lennon–McCartney except where noted.

Side one
No.	Title	Writer(s)	Lead vocals	Length
1.	"Drive My Car"		McCartney with Lennon	2:25
2.	"Norwegian Wood (This Bird Has Flown)"		Lennon	2:05
3.	"You Won't See Me"		McCartney	3:18
4.	"Nowhere Man"		Lennon	2:40
5.	"Think for Yourself"	George Harrison	Harrison	2:16
6.	"The Word"		Lennon	2:41
7.	"Michelle"		McCartney	2:40
Total length:				18:05

Side two
No.	Title	Writer(s)	Lead vocals	Length
1.	"What Goes On"	Lennon–McCartney–Richard Starkey	Starr	2:47
2.	"Girl"		Lennon	2:30
3.	"I'm Looking Through You"		McCartney	2:23
4.	"In My Life"		Lennon	2:24
5.	"Wait"		Lennon and McCartney	2:12
6.	"If I Needed Someone"	Harrison	Harrison	2:20
7.	"Run for Your Life"		Lennon	2:18
Total length:				16:54

=== Original North American release ===
Compared to the UK/worldwide release, the original North American release of Rubber Soul dropped four tracks ("Drive My Car", "Nowhere Man", "What Goes On" and "If I Needed Someone") and added two others ("I've Just Seen A Face" and "It's Only Love"). In addition, the mixes (supervised by Dave Dexter Jr.) are in some cases slightly different from the UK/worldwide versions. For example, the North American stereo version of "I'm Looking Through You" contains two false guitar starts not heard elsewhere, while "The Word" also differs from the UK version, with several different and additional vocal parts, and the panning treatment given to one of the percussion parts.

All tracks are written by Lennon–McCartney except where noted.

Side one
No.	Title	Writer(s)	Lead vocals	Length
1.	"I've Just Seen a Face"		McCartney	2:04
2.	"Norwegian Wood (This Bird Has Flown)"		Lennon	2:05
3.	"You Won't See Me"		McCartney	3:19
4.	"Think for Yourself"	Harrison	Harrison	2:19
5.	"The Word"		Lennon	2:42
6.	"Michelle"		McCartney	2:42
Total length:				15:11

Side two
No.	Title	Lead vocals	Length
1.	"It's Only Love"	Lennon	1:53
2.	"Girl"	Lennon	2:33
3.	"I'm Looking Through You"	McCartney	2:24
4.	"In My Life"	Lennon	2:24
5.	"Wait"	Lennon and McCartney	2:15
6.	"Run for Your Life"	Lennon	2:15
Total length:			13:44

== Personnel ==
According to Mark Lewisohn and Ian MacDonald, except where noted:

The Beatles

- John Lennon – lead, harmony and backing vocals; rhythm, acoustic and lead guitars; organ on "Think for Yourself"; tambourine
- Paul McCartney – lead, harmony and backing vocals; bass, acoustic and lead guitars; piano; maracas
- George Harrison – lead, harmony and backing vocals; lead, rhythm and acoustic guitars; sitar on "Norwegian Wood"; maracas, tambourine
- Ringo Starr – drums, tambourine, maracas, cowbell, bells, cymbals; Hammond organ on "I'm Looking Through You"; lead vocals on "What Goes On"

Production and additional personnel

- George Martin – production, mixing; piano on "In My Life", harmonium on "The Word" and "If I Needed Someone"
- Mal Evans – Hammond organ on "You Won't See Me"
- Norman Smith – engineering, mixing
- Robert Freeman – photography
- Charles Front – illustration

== Charts ==
=== Weekly charts ===
Original release
Chart (1965–66)	Peak position
Australian Kent Music Report	1
Canadian CHUM's Album Index	1
Finnish Albums Chart	1
Swedish Kvällstoppen Chart	20
UK Record Retailer LPs Chart	1
US Billboard Top LPs	1
US Cash Box Top 100 Albums	1
US Record World 100 Top LP's	1
West German Musikmarkt LP Hit-Parade	1

1987 reissue
Chart	Position
Dutch MegaChart Albums	53
UK Albums Chart	60
US Billboard Top Compact Disks	2

2009 reissue
Chart	Position
Australian ARIA Albums	41
Austrian Ö3 Top 40 Longplay (Albums)	53
Belgian Ultratop 200 Albums (Flanders)	26
Belgian Ultratop 200 Albums (Walloonia)	49
Danish Tracklisten Album Top-40	31
Dutch MegaChart Albums	87
Finnish Official Albums Chart	17
Italian FIMI Albums Chart	36
Japanese Oricon Albums Chart	24
New Zealand RIANZ Albums	25
Portuguese AFP Top 50 Albums	14
Spanish PROMUSICAE Top 100 Albums	59
Swedish Sverigetopplistan Albums Top 60	17
Swiss Hitparade Albums Top 100	51
UK Albums Chart	10

Chart (2020–2026)	Peak position
Croatian International Albums (HDU)	2
Greece Albums (Billboard)	2

=== Monthly charts ===
Monthly chart performance
Chart (2026)	Position
Croatian International Vinyl Albums (HDU)	6

=== Year-end charts ===
Year-end chart performance for Rubber Soul
Chart (1965)	Ranking
UK Record Retailer	3

Year-end chart performance for Rubber Soul
Chart (1966)	Ranking
UK Record Retailer	3
US Billboard	4
US Cash Box	16

=== Decade-end charts ===
Decade-end chart performance for Rubber Soul
Chart (1960s)	Ranking
UK Albums Chart	8

== Certifications ==
Certifications for Rubber Soul
Region	Certification	Certified units/sales
Argentina (CAPIF)	2× Platinum	120,000^{^}
Australia (ARIA)	Platinum	70,000^{^}
Brazil (Pro-Música Brasil)	Gold	100,000^{*}
Canada (Music Canada)	2× Platinum	200,000^{^}
Germany (BVMI)	Gold	250,000^{^}
Italy (FIMI) sales since 2009	Gold	25,000^{‡}
New Zealand (RMNZ)	Platinum	15,000^{^}
United Kingdom (BPI)	2× Platinum	600,000^{^}
United States (RIAA)	6× Platinum	6,000,000^{^}
^{*} Sales figures based on certification alone.^{^} Shipments figures based on certification alone.^{‡} Sales+streaming figures based on certification alone.

^{†} BPI certification awarded only for sales since 1994.

== See also ==
- Outline of the Beatles
- The Beatles timeline
- The Beatles albums discography
