= Drive My Car (song) =

1965 song by the Beatles

- Sheet music cover

Song by the Beatles

from the album Rubber Soul
- Released: 3 December 1965
- Recorded: 13 October 1965
- Studio: EMI, London
- Genre: Rock; R&B
- Length: 2:28
- Label: Parlophone, EMI
- Songwriter: Lennon–McCartney
- Producer: George Martin

Audio sample
- file; help

"Drive My Car" is a song by the English rock band the Beatles, written primarily by Paul McCartney, with lyrical contributions from John Lennon. It was first released on the band's 1965 album Rubber Soul as the opening track. The song later appeared in North America on the Yesterday and Today collection, again to open the record, as the track had been dropped from the American version of Rubber Soul.

== Lyrics ==
A woman tells the song's male narrator that she is going to be a famous movie star, and she offers him the opportunity to be her chauffeur, adding: "and maybe I'll love you". When he objects that his "prospects [are] good", she retorts, "Working for peanuts is all very fine/But I can show you a better time." When he agrees to her proposal, she admits, "I got no car and it's breakin' my heart/But I've found a driver and that's a start." According to McCartney, "'Drive my car' was an old blues euphemism for sex".

== Composition ==
When McCartney arrived at Lennon's Weybridge home for a writing session, he had the tune in his head, but "the lyrics were disastrous, and I knew it." The chorus began, "You can buy me diamond rings", a cliché they had used twice before, in "Can't Buy Me Love" and "I Feel Fine" (as well as in the discarded "If You've Got Trouble"). Lennon dismissed the lyrics as "crap" and "too soft". They decided to rewrite the lyrics and after some difficulty – McCartney said it was "one of the stickiest" writing sessions – they settled on the "drive my car" theme (which Bob Spitz credits to Lennon) and the rest of the lyrics flowed easily from that.

== Recording ==
"Drive My Car" was recorded on 13 October 1965 during the Beatles' first recording session to extend past midnight. McCartney worked closely with George Harrison on the basic rhythm track, the pair playing, in author Ian MacDonald's description, "similar riffing lines on bass and low guitar", respectively, as per Harrison's suggestion. Harrison had been listening to Otis Redding's "Respect" at the time and, as a result of this influence, "Drive My Car" contains more bottom end than previous Beatles recordings, mimicking the bass-heavy sound captured in Redding's Memphis studio; as Ian MacDonald points out, the bassline appears to be directly derived from the bassline of Redding's version of "Respect". Author Robert Rodriguez describes the track as an "overt R&B workout" and a rare example of the Beatles demonstrating their admiration of Stax and Motown artists on the mostly folk rock-oriented Rubber Soul.

McCartney sang the main vocal part, giving it an energetic push that journalist Richie Unterberger calls "a commanding ... hard rock vocal". The vocal rides above a simple two-chord funk riff in the verse, and a much more complex chorus containing piano-driven jazz-style key modulations. McCartney overdubbed both the piano part and the slide guitar solo. The song opens with a bluesy riff played on two electric guitars, before the bass enters. This opening section was also overdubbed onto the basic track. According to musicologist Walter Everett, it provides an ametrical and "off-balance" introduction, "with its blue notes presaging what is to come".

== Release ==
The song was not widely released as a single, although it did receive a release in a number of countries in Europe, Africa and Asia. It was also released as part of a 4-track EP. A Belgian release on Parlophone reached number one in its national chart (see below).

== Personnel ==
According to Walter Everett, except where noted:

- Paul McCartney – lead vocal, bass guitar, piano, slide guitar
- John Lennon – lead vocal, tambourine
- George Harrison – harmony vocal, lead guitar
- Ringo Starr – drums, cowbell

== Charts ==
Weekly chart performance for "Drive My Car"
Chart (1966)	Peak position
Belgium (Ultratop 50 Wallonia)	1

== Certifications ==
Region	Certification	Certified units/sales
United Kingdom (BPI)	Silver	200,000^{‡}
^{‡} Sales+streaming figures based on certification alone.

== Cover versions ==
In 1988, American acapella singer Bobby McFerrin released a cover of the song on his second studio album Simple Pleasures. The Donnas, an American rock band, released a cover of the song on This Bird Has Flown – A 40th Anniversary Tribute to the Beatles' Rubber Soul in 2005. Humble Pie included a cover on their eighth studio album Street Rats in 1975.

== Sources ==
- The Beatles (2000). The Beatles Anthology. San Francisco, CA: Chronicle Books. ISBN 978-0-8118-2684-6.
- Everett, Walter (2001). The Beatles as Musicians: The Quarry Men through Rubber Soul. New York, NY: Oxford University Press. ISBN 0-19-514105-9.
- Lewisohn, Mark (2005) [1988]. The Complete Beatles Recording Sessions: The Official Story of the Abbey Road Years 1962–1970. London: Bounty Books. ISBN 978-0-7537-2545-0.
- MacDonald, Ian (2005). Revolution in the Head: The Beatles' Records and the Sixties. Chicago, IL: Chicago Review Press. ISBN 978-1-55652-733-3.
- Miles, Barry (1997). Paul McCartney: Many Years from Now. New York, NY: Henry Holt & Company. ISBN 0-8050-5249-6.
- Riley, Tim (2002) [1988]. Tell Me Why – The Beatles: Album by Album, Song by Song, the Sixties and After. Cambridge, MA: Da Capo Press. ISBN 978-0-306-81120-3.
- Rodriguez, Robert (2012). Revolver: How the Beatles Reimagined Rock 'n' Roll. Milwaukee, WI: Backbeat Books. ISBN 978-1-61713-009-0.
- Womack, Kenneth (2007). Long and Winding Roads: The Evolving Artistry of the Beatles. New York, NY: Continuum. ISBN 978-0-8264-1746-6.
