= Wait (Beatles song) =

1965 song by the Beatles

- Sheet music cover

Song by the Beatles

from the album Rubber Soul
- Released: 3 December 1965
- Recorded: 17 June, 11 November 1965
- Studio: EMI, London
- Genre: Folk rock
- Length: 2:13
- Label: Parlophone (UK), Capitol (US)
- Songwriter(s): Lennon–McCartney
- Producer(s): George Martin

"Wait" is a song by the English rock band the Beatles from their 1965 album Rubber Soul. The song is credited to the Lennon–McCartney partnership. In the 1997 book Many Years from Now, Paul McCartney recalls it as entirely his work. In a 1970 interview with Ray Connolly, John Lennon could not remember writing it, saying, "That must be one of Paul's."

== Origin and recording ==
The song was originally recorded for Help! in June 1965, but was rejected for inclusion on the album. When Rubber Soul fell one song short for a Christmas release, the Beatles revisited "Wait". Overdubs were added to the initial recording so it would blend in better with the more recent songs on Rubber Soul.

In the view of authors Jean-Michel Guesdon and Philippe Margotin, the lyrics "probably reflected his [McCartney's] complex relationship with Jane Asher: 'I am often away, but if you really love me, wait for me'". The vocals on the verse are shared between Lennon and McCartney, and McCartney sings the two middle eight sections. For his guitar part, George Harrison uses a volume pedal, which he earlier employed on "I Need You" and "Yes It Is".

== Reception ==
Richie Unterberger of AllMusic writes that the song, while not one of the best on Rubber Soul, still fits in with the album comfortably enough. He compliments the song's "sorrowful melodies", calling them one of the most sorrowful of the Lennon–McCartney library, and notes that it's one of the few Beatles songs to be in a minor key. In his review for the 50th anniversary of Rubber Soul, Jacob Albano of Classic Rock Review writes: "'Wait' features great choruses and a decent bridge by McCartney along with a creative percussive ensemble and pedal-effected guitars", but concludes by calling it an otherwise weak song for its parent album.

== Personnel ==
According to Ian MacDonald:

- John Lennon – double tracked vocals, rhythm guitar
- Paul McCartney – double tracked vocals, bass guitar
- George Harrison – lead guitar
- Ringo Starr – drums, maracas, tambourine

== Bibliography ==
- Guesdon, Jean-Michel; Margotin, Philippe (2013). All the Songs: The Story Behind Every Beatles Release. New York City: Black Dog & Leventhal. ISBN 978-1-57912-952-1.
- MacDonald, Ian (2005). Revolution in the Head. London: Pimlico. ISBN 978-1-84413-828-9.
