= I'm Looking Through You =

1965 song by the Beatles

- Sheet music cover

Song by the Beatles

from the album Rubber Soul
- Released: 3 December 1965
- Recorded: 10–11 November 1965
- Studio: EMI, London
- Genre: Folk rock
- Length: 2:27
- Label: Parlophone
- Songwriter: Lennon–McCartney
- Producer: George Martin

"I'm Looking Through You" is a song by the English rock band the Beatles from their 1965 album Rubber Soul. It was written by Paul McCartney and credited to Lennon–McCartney. McCartney wrote the song about English actress Jane Asher, his girlfriend for much of the 1960s, and her refusal to give up her stage career and focus on his needs. The line "You don't look different, but you have changed" reflects his dissatisfaction with their relationship. The lyrics also refer to his changing emotional state: "Love has a nasty habit of disappearing overnight".

== Composition ==
"I'm Looking Through You" is in the key of A♭ major. The song primarily features McCartney's lead vocals, which is double tracked throughout, with Lennon's harmony vocals being tracked in the third phrase of each verse. The outro switches over to single-tracking, which Alan W. Pollack opines creates a "surprising last-minute sense of increased intimacy and immediacy". The primary instruments featured on the song are the acoustic guitar, electric bass, and tambourines, along with hand claps.

== Recording ==
During October and November 1965, the Beatles recorded three versions of "I'm Looking Through You". Take 1 was recorded on 24 October and was slower than the version released on Rubber Soul, having a tempo of 132 beats per minute. It had a significantly different rhythm and lacked the "Why, tell me why …" middle eight of the final version. Take 1 was eventually released in 1996 on the Anthology 2 compilation. Take 1 also featured an electric twelve-bar blues jam, and a pitch centre in the key of G.

The Beatles recorded the first remake of the track on 6 November, towards the end of the Rubber Soul sessions, but were again dissatisfied with the result. Take 4, the final version, was recorded on 10 November with overdubs on 11 November. This version is in the key of A♭ and features a bridge passage based on a descending major scale, extending a ninth from 6 down to 5. The same melodic structure was later used by McCartney in the verse of "Penny Lane", the chorus of "Maxwell's Silver Hammer", and in instrumental sections of "Hello, Goodbye" and "Lady Madonna".

The final released version features several faintly audible abnormalities such as incomplete hand clapping, stray guitar notes and tambourine hits; whether these mistakes went unnoticed during post-production or were intentionally left in remains uncertain. The North American stereo version of the song contains two false guitar starts, which were cut from the other mixes. Allegedly, the engineers at Capitol Records thought the false start was intentional, and left it in.

The album sleeve and other sources indicate that Ringo Starr played Hammond organ on this track. Starr plays quick two-note vamps in the choruses. Mark Lewisohn reported that Hammond organ was not listed on the session tape box.

== Critical reception ==
In his contemporary review of Rubber Soul for the NME, Allen Evans said that "I'm Looking Through You" sounded "like earlier Beatles numbers", adding: "A quiet, rocking song about a girl who has changed after letting her boy down. Ringo on organ!" Record Mirror's reviewer recognised Starr's unfamiliar role as an example of the album's "spirit of everybody having a go at everything". The writer admired the song's rhythm, McCartney's singing, and George Harrison's "top-notch guitar-work". Nikki Wine of KRLA Beat described the track as a "really swingin' cut" and "Wonderful fun", with an "almost-bluesy sound".

Thomas Ward of AllMusic calls "I'm Looking Through You" one of the "finest" songs on Rubber Soul and one of the "minor gems of the Beatles canon". He highlights McCartney's lyrics, describing them as one of the most "mature" of the period, and praises his lead vocal.

== Personnel ==
According to authors Jean-Michel Guesdon and Philippe Margotin except where noted:

- Paul McCartney – double-tracked vocals, bass guitar
- John Lennon – harmony vocal, acoustic guitar
- George Harrison – lead guitar, tambourine
- Ringo Starr – drums, matchbox, Hammond organ

== Sources ==
- Everett, Walter (1999). The Beatles as Musicians: Revolver Through the Anthology. New York, NY: Oxford University Press. ISBN 978-0-19-512941-0.
- Everett, Walter (2001). The Beatles as Musicians: The Quarry Men Through Rubber Soul. New York, NY: Oxford University Press. ISBN 0-19-514105-9.
- Guesdon, Jean-Michel; Margotin, Philippe (2013). All the Songs: The Story Behind Every Beatles Release. New York, NY: Black Dog & Leventhal. ISBN 978-1-57912-952-1.
- Kruth, John (2015). This Bird Has Flown: The Enduring Beauty of Rubber Soul, Fifty Years On. Milwaukee, WI: Backbeat Books. ISBN 978-1617135736.
- Lewisohn, Mark (2005) [1988]. The Complete Beatles Recording Sessions: The Official Story of the Abbey Road Years 1962–1970. London: Bounty Books. ISBN 978-0-7537-2545-0.
- MacDonald, Ian (1998). Revolution in the Head: The Beatles' Records and the Sixties. London: Pimlico. ISBN 0-7126-6697-4.
- Spitz, Bob (2005). The Beatles: The Biography. Boston, MA: Little, Brown. ISBN 0-316-80352-9.
- Unterberger, Richie (2002). Turn! Turn! Turn!: The '60s Folk-Rock Revolution. San Francisco: Backbeat Books. ISBN 0-87930-703-X.
- Winn, John C. (2008). Way Beyond Compare: The Beatles' Recorded Legacy, Volume One, 1962–1965. New York, NY: Three Rivers Press. ISBN 978-0-3074-5239-9.
- Winn, John C. (2009). That Magic Feeling: The Beatles' Recorded Legacy, Volume Two, 1966–1970. New York, NY: Three Rivers Press. ISBN 978-0-307-45239-9.
