= Girl (Beatles song) =

- Picture sleeve for the 1966 Italian single release

Song by the Beatles

from the album Rubber Soul
- Released: 3 December 1965
- Recorded: 11 November 1965
- Studio: EMI, London
- Genre: Folk rock, pop
- Length: 2:32
- Label: Parlophone
- Songwriter: Lennon–McCartney
- Producer: George Martin

Audio sample
- file; help

"Girl" is a song by the English rock band the Beatles from their 1965 album Rubber Soul. It was written by John Lennon and credited to Lennon–McCartney. "Girl" was the last complete song recorded for that album. "Girl" is considered to be one of the most melancholic and complex of the Beatles' love songs.

== Composition ==
"Girl" is real. There is no such thing as the girl, she was a dream, but the words are all right. It wasn't just a song, and it was about that girl – that turned out to be Yoko, in the end – the one that a lot of us were looking for.

— John Lennon

The song's instrumentation has specific similarities to Greek music, as with "And I Love Her" and "Michelle". As for the inspiration of the song's lyrics, Lennon stated that the "girl" was an archetype he had been searching for and would finally find in Yoko Ono. In an interview for Rolling Stone magazine in 1980, Lennon said of his song "Woman": "Reminds me of a Beatles track, but I wasn't trying to make it sound like that. I did it as I did 'Girl' many years ago. So this is the grown-up version of 'Girl'."

McCartney claimed that he contributed the lines "Was she told when she was young that pain would lead to pleasure" and "That a man must break his back to earn his day of leisure." However, in a 1970 interview with Rolling Stone, Lennon explained that he wrote these lines as a comment on Christianity, which he was "opposed to at the time". Lennon said: "I was just talking about Christianity, in that – a thing like you have to be tortured to attain heaven ... – be tortured and then it'll be alright, which seems to be a bit true but not in their concept of it. But I didn't believe in that, that you have to be tortured to attain anything, it just so happens that you were".

== Recording ==
Author Ian MacDonald describes "Girl" as "Lennon's answer to McCartney's 'Michelle': another Euro-song, replacing his partner's suave mock-French with a decadent German two-step crossed with Mikis Theodorakis's music for Zorba the Greek". Performed by Lennon and George Harrison, the acoustic guitars on the track were played with capos, lending an extra brightness to their sound. Musicologist Walter Everett comments that one of Harrison's guitar parts has the capo positioned so high up the neck and is played by him in a manner that creates a "nasal, sitar-like 'bouzouki' sound".

Lennon's lead vocals were initially overdubbed and featured a characteristic unheard before on a Beatles song. In McCartney's description: "My main memory is that John wanted to hear the breathing, wanted it to be very intimate, so George Martin put a special compressor on the voice, then John dubbed it. … I remember John saying to the engineer (Norman Smith) when we did 'Girl,' that when he draws his breath in, he wants to hear it." Following the Beatles' request, the engineer added more treble to the vocal, which, in Everett's description, matches the sound and timbre of the brushed cymbal played by Ringo Starr. In the song's middle eight sections, McCartney and Harrison sing the word "tit" repeatedly as vocal harmony. McCartney stated that this part of the vocal arrangement was influenced by the Beach Boys particularly the song "You're So Good to Me". He recalled: "The Beach Boys had a song [You're So Good to Me] out where they'd done 'la la la' and we loved the innocence of that and wanted to copy it, but not use the same phrase."

== Cancelled 1977 single release ==
In early 1966, "Girl" was issued as the B-side of "Michelle" in several European countries, reaching number one in Finland. It was also released as the A-side of a single in Italy, backed by "Nowhere Man", which reached number seven on the nation's Musica e Dischi singles chart.

In November 1977, Capitol Records scheduled the United States release of "Girl" backed with "You're Going to Lose That Girl" as a single (Capitol 4506) to accompany the release of Love Songs, a Beatles' compilation album that contains both of these songs. However, the single was cancelled before it was issued. Promotional copies, which featured "Girl" on both sides—one in stereo, the other mono, along with a picture sleeve, were issued. (All copies of this promotional single were pressed on black vinyl.)

== Personnel ==
According to Ian MacDonald, except as noted:

- John Lennon – lead vocals, acoustic guitar
- Paul McCartney – backing vocals, bass guitar
- George Harrison – backing vocals, lead acoustic guitar, 12-string guitar
- Ringo Starr – drums

== Charts ==
Weekly chart performance for "Girl"
Chart (1966–67)	Peak position
Argentina (CAPIF)	1
Belgium (Ultratop 50 Wallonia)	1
Italy (Musica e dischi)	11
Peru (La Prensa)	2
Spain (AFYVE)	5

== Cover versions ==
- The English freakbeat rock band St. Louis Union's version of "Girl" reached No. 11 in the UK Singles Chart in February 1966.
- Dalida recorded an italian version under the title "Amo", published in the album Dalida in 1966.
- Jazz Guitarist Charlie Byrd interpreted "Girl" in his 1966 album Byrdland.
- Tiny Tim sang "Girl" with Brave Combo as the title track of his final recording, the 1996 album Girl.
- Jim Sturgess sang "Girl" in the 2007 film musical Across the Universe.
