= Wall of Sound =

Production method developed by Phil Spector

Phil Spector's usual studio musicians, later dubbed "the Wrecking Crew", gathered at a Gold Star recording session in the 1960s.

The Wall of Sound is a recording approach and style of music production developed by American producer and songwriter Phil Spector at Gold Star Studios in the early 1960s. Aspiring for an aesthetic akin to the live spontaneity of 1950s rock 'n' roll records on an orchestral scale, his method involved treatment of the studio as a compositional tool alongside a rotating ensemble of about twenty-five Los Angeles-based session musicians, later known as the Wrecking Crew and sometimes credited as "the Phil Spector Wall of Sound Orchestra". From 1962 to 1966, he produced over a dozen U.S. top 40 hits, most of which were co-authored with songwriting teams such as Ellie Greenwich and Jeff Barry, and nearly all in conjunction with arranger Jack Nitzsche and engineer Larry Levine.

Spector's process combined arranging, rehearsal, and mixing simultaneously. Furthering R&B recording practices learned under Leiber and Stoller, his self-described "Wagnerian" approach quadrupled the typical four-person rock band lineup, augmented by woodwind, brass, and string sections. He mixed exclusively in mono and around extreme loudness, and prominently employed ambience and echo, reverb and compression effects unique to Gold Star's constrained layout. Sessions routinely exceeded the standard three-hour block; he devoted much of the time to diffusing instruments, a process coupling orchestral doubling with level balancing and microphone placement, which produced a chorusing or phasing effect irreplicable through electronic means.

Elements of Spector's technique spread throughout rock music and informed the development of styles including the Motown sound, psychedelia, French yé-yé, and later Philadelphia soul and Japanese popular music. By the mid-1960s, the Wall of Sound was reconfigured by producers such as Shadow Morton, Brian Wilson, Andrew Loog Oldham, and Johnny Franz; many acts, including Wizzard, ABBA, and Bruce Springsteen, enjoyed success with variants of the technique through the 1970s. By the 1980s, large-scale live ensemble recording in popular music had waned, at which time a broad indie music movement, encompassing alternative rock, shoegaze and dream pop bands, developed an offshoot of the Wall of Sound that substituted its orchestration with digital effects and loud, distorted guitars. Pioneering groups included Cocteau Twins, the Jesus and Mary Chain, and My Bloody Valentine.

== Background and early influences ==
Spector's early music interests included dance music, showtunes, top 40 radio, jazz, and blues. His musical education came largely through listening and purchasing sheet music, and he cited jazz, early rock and roll, and African-American musical traditions as his formative influences. He acquired his first guitar at age 13 and received lessons from session musicians Burdell Mathis, Howard Roberts, and Bill Pitman. After attending an Ella Fitzgerald concert in 1955 that featured guitarist Barney Kessel—whom he later called the “greatest musician I’ve ever known”—Spector met Kessel, who encouraged him to pursue rock and roll over jazz, assisted him with recordings at Wallichs Music City's demo booths, and advised him to observe Hollywood studio sessions.

By 1956, Spector was drawn to the emerging rock and roll sound typified by performers such as Elvis Presley and Buddy Holly. In addition to learning accordion and French horn, he participated in the music programs at Fairfax High School, performed locally with peers such as guitarist Marshall Leib and saxophonist Steve Douglas, and became acquainted with fellow student Michael Spencer, a classically trained pianist. He frequently visited Spencer's family household, whose audio system had large Patrician Electro-Voice speakers and an amplifier equipped with a "time-lag" feature that simulated concert hall reverberation. Using this set-up, Spector studied composers such as Jean Sibelius, George Gershwin, and Richard Wagner. According to musicologist Sean MacLeod, Wagner became the main source of inspiration for Spector in his Wall of Sound technique.

The records are built like a Wagnerian opera. They start simply and end with dynamic force, meaning and purpose…It’s in the mind. I dreamed it up. It’s like art movies. I aimed to get the record industry forward a little bit, make a sound that was universal.

— Phil Spector quoted in the London Evening Standard, January 1964

Initially, Spector's own sessions generally employed a standard rhythm section of bass, drums, piano, and two or three guitarists. By age 21, he controlled his independent label, Philles Records, exercising comprehensive authority over his productions, which he likened to art films and "little symphonies for the kids". He diverged from the prevailing minimalism of rock and roll production, then perceived as the genre's main appeal, and employed an orchestra of musicians. In 1964, he explained that his objective was to develop a sound capable of "fifteen hit records and more" even with weak material: "It was a case of augmenting, augmenting, augmenting. It all fitted like a jigsaw." Author and musician Bob Stanley later characterized the resulting sound as a "dam-busting" amplification of the production style heard on the Aquatones' 1958 record "You".

== Etymology ==
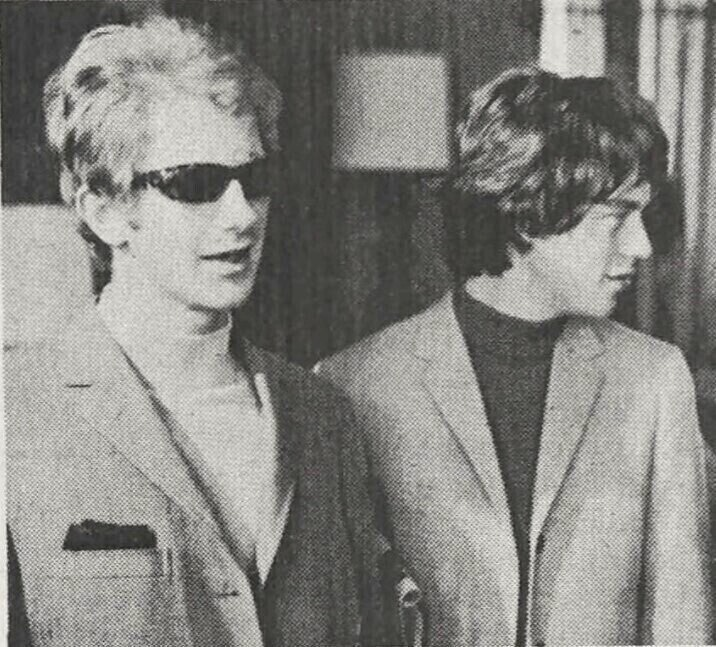
Andrew Loog Oldham (left) with Mick Jagger in 1966. Oldham popularized the term "wall of sound" to describe Spector's production style, which Oldham imitated on records produced for the Rolling Stones.

The earliest known use of the phrase "wall of sound" appeared in an 1884 New York Times report on Wagner's redesign of the Bayreuth Festival Theater, where an orchestra pit placement created the illusion of a sonic wall emanating from an unseen source. The term reemerged in the 1950s in association with Stan Kenton's big band arrangement and later applied by English producer Andrew Loog Oldham as a catch-all descriptor for Spector's production style. In the United Kingdom, producer George Martin had issued a version of "You've Lost That Lovin' Feelin'" by Cilla Black before the Righteous Brothers' original was made available. In response, Oldham placed advertisements in Melody Maker promoting the original version as a "wall of sound".

Less commonly, the term "Spector Sound" (or "Spectorsound") is used. He rejected such characterization, explaining in a 1969 interview: "I don't have a sound, a Phil Spector sound. I have a style, and my style is just a particular way of making records." Related terms later included "Spectropop" and "Gold Star single", both referencing 1960s orchestral pop records using his approach. "Wall of Sound” was also adopted for the Grateful Dead's unrelated live sound system used mainly in 1974.

== Songwriters and collaborators ==
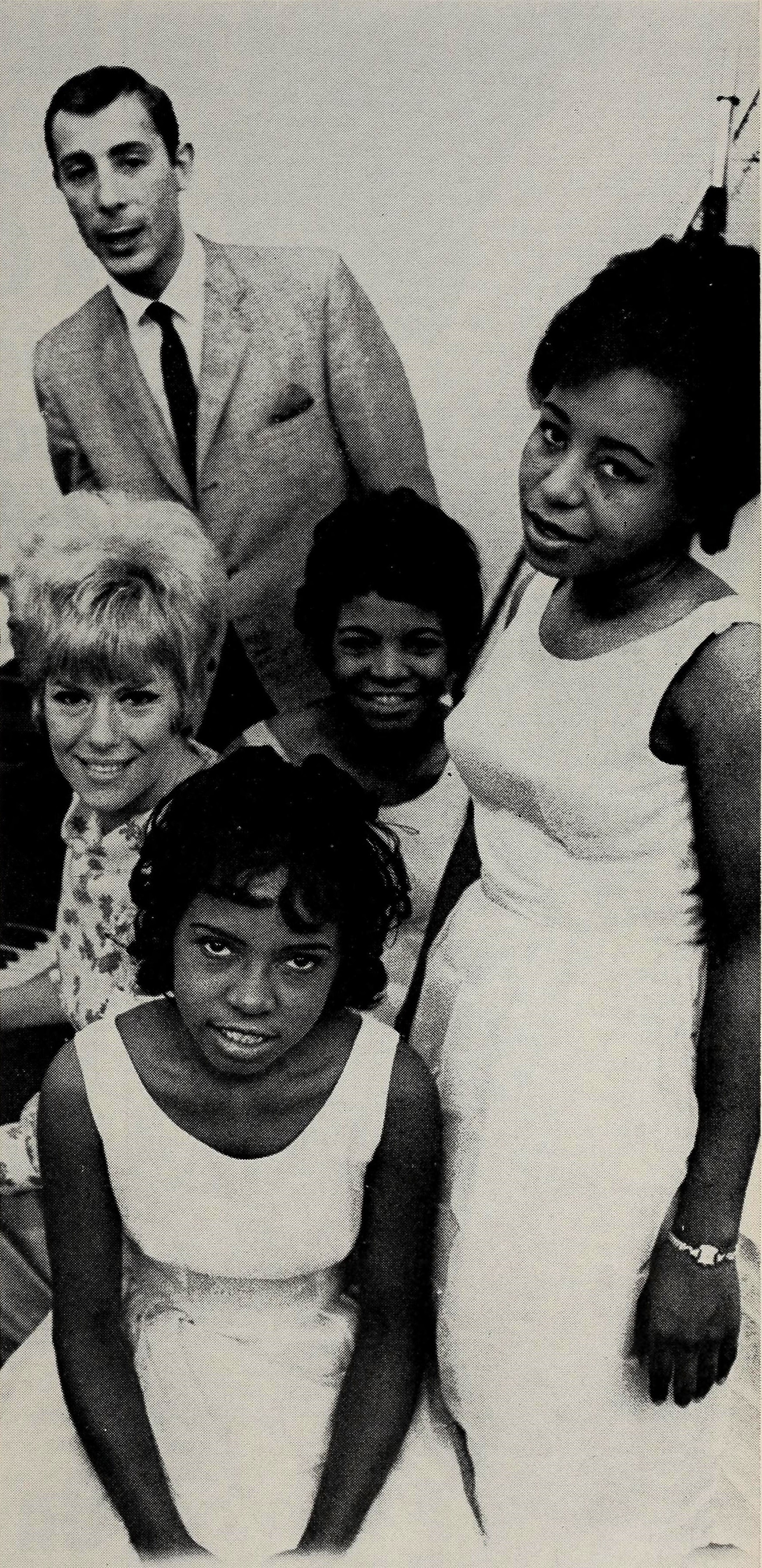
Spector's songwriting collaborators Ellie Greenwich and Jeff Barry with the Dixie Cups (1964)

Coverage of Spector's method in the 1960s sometimes excluded principal collaborators and reinforced a perception that he worked in isolation. As his industry influence grew, he regularly negotiated co-writing credit, arguing that a song was not complete until it had been produced. Many of his songwriting credits were shared with Brill Building teams such as Gerry Goffin and Carole King or Ellie Greenwich and Jeff Barry and he characterized his own collaborative role as that of "a steering wheel" guiding their musical and lyrical ideas. His most prolific songwriting partnership was with Greenwich and Barry, whose working sessions involved Greenwich on piano, Spector on guitar, and Barry on percussion. Spector considered them to be the most synchronized with his creative vision: "The others understood, but not as much as Jeff and Ellie did." (Note: Greenwich and Barry differed from Spector’s other songwriting partnerships: unlike other songwriting teams that typically divided responsibilities between lyricist and composer, both contributed across disciplines. In addition, they drew little from Broadway, jazz, or classical repertoire.)

Spector's most commercially successful period, from 1962 to 1966, consistently involved arranger Jack Nitzsche and engineer Larry Levine. He employed a rotating core group of about twenty-five studio musicians, later dubbed "the Wrecking Crew", that were drawn from the broader pool of Los Angeles session players and sometimes credited as "the Phil Spector Wall of Sound Orchestra". This group included one of his earliest collaborators, saxophonist Nino Tempo, an occasional songwriting partner who regularly participated in sessions until the late 1970s.

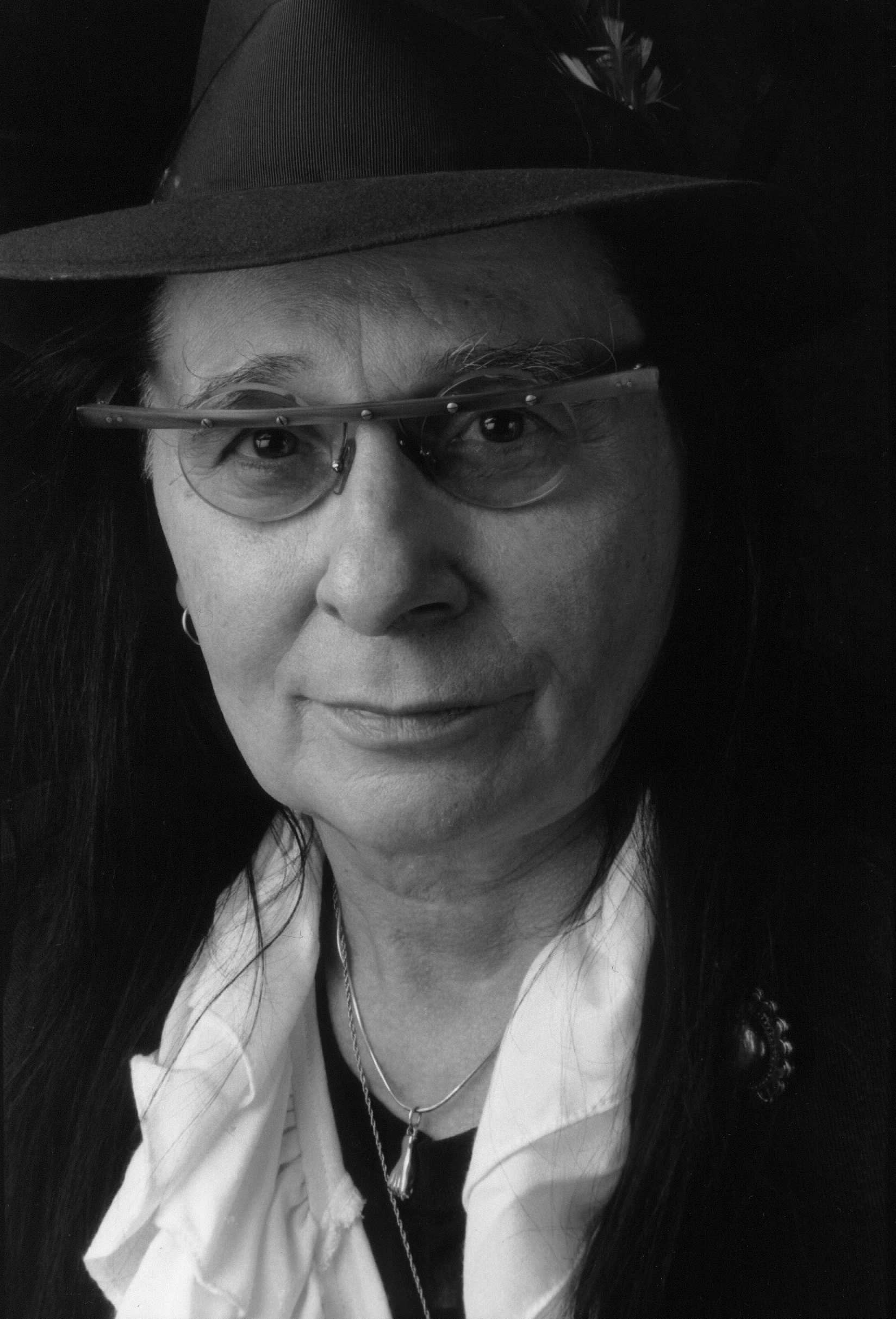
Jack Nitzsche (pictured circa 1990s) co-arranged the majority of songs produced by Spector in the 1960s

Together with Spector and his studio ensemble, Nitzsche and Levine comprised the core creative team at Philles Records. Spector constructed his arrangements from lead sheets prepared by Nitzsche, who shared his affinity for Motown and classical music, as well as his goal to expand the sonic scale of their recordings, unlike several of Spector's previous arrangers, who had left due to the lengthy recording sessions and frequent changes to musical charts. A formally trained musician, Nitzsche translated Spector's conceptual ideas into written arrangements, which they occasionally developed outside of the studio, and he often amplified Spector's suggestions beyond their initial scope.

Expounding on his own role as an arranger, Spector stated, "I write down every note, and then just had [the arranger] do the actual writing and block the chords out, so they’d know how to change it when I was at the studio. In the studio, I’d say 'Change it – make everybody a third higher' and they'd do that stuff." Jeff Barry explained that Nitzsche could typically compose what Spector wanted and design string arrangements independently, however, Nitzsche would notate specific melodic riffs or breaks conceived by Spector or the songwriters. MacLeod writes that "many felt Nitzsche was undoubtedly the architect" of Spector's vision.

Levine, relative to Nitzsche, occupied a more deferential role. He strictly followed Spector's instruction and attributed his "biggest" contribution to being Spector's "sounding board": "When we were in the control room, he would ask me endlessly ‘What do you think?’” Granted the latitude to adjust the mix as needed, according to biographer Mark Ribowsky, Levine was “the only absolute essential” among Spector's engineers. Reflecting on his role, Levine stated that Spector had "very specific" goals, differing from typical producers who "spoke in generalities", but was also "pliable" and willing to accept unexpected results, explaining that his own "contribution to it was minor. You really did have to hear what Phil heard, and nobody could."

The musicians had some input on the recordings. Bassist Ray Pohlman recalled that Spector sometimes allowed the sound to evolve with the band during sessions and "always seemed to have an idea of what he was after, but I don't know if he could always express it." Nitzsche stated that only the drummers were allowed creative liberties with their parts, whereas keyboardist Don Randi said, "There was Phil and there was stuff you did on your own. And people forget about that. And, as great as it was, we were making up parts half the time."

== Gold Star Studio A and recording atmosphere ==
Between 1958 and 1966, Spector conducted the majority of his recording sessions at Gold Star Studios in Hollywood. Originally constructed in 1950 in a former dental office, the facility was co-founded by Stan Ross and Dave Gold, who also designed and built its equipment. The recording space itself was unusually small, measured at approximately 23 by 35 feet with a ceiling height of 11.5 feet. These constraints, together with the studio's idiosyncratic layout, acoustics, and echo chambers, were central to the Wall of Sound. Guitarist Jerry Cole felt "if it wasn't for Gold Star he would never have had a 'Wall of Sound' [...] The studio and Gold Star's echo chambers was the 'Wall of Sound.'”

A Phil Spector session was a party session. Phil would have a notice on the door of the studio, "Closed Session", and anyone who stuck their head in he’d grab them and give them a tambourine or a cowbell. There’d sometimes be more percussionists than orchestra. I used to call it the Phil-harmonic.

— Drummer Hal Blaine

Sessions were often crowded, with musicians, observers, and additional personnel. Visitors were routinely invited to join the session by playing percussion instruments. The crowd added to the overall effect, according to Levine: "I found out that the more people you put in the room, the better the sound is. The bodies provide dampening." Asked if the Wall of Sound was perceptible from within the control room, Levine said it was, though it would not be immediately apparent during tracking sessions, as Spector would raise the monitor to extreme levels for visitors.

Attendees included music executives, friends, and aspiring industry figures; among them, record promoter Sonny Bono and his girlfriend Cher, who regularly contributed backing vocals and percussion, and talent scout David Geffen, later the founder of Geffen Records. (Note: At Nitzsche's urging, Bono had sought work with Spector in late 1962 and was hired as a West Coast promotion man and general assistant. He sometimes joined the backing singers or playing percussion.) Levine positioned Cher at the back of the group, away from the microphone, to prevent her from overpowering other voices.

Spector's preference for recording in Los Angeles over New York stemmed partly from lower union rates, fewer restrictions on overdubbing, and greater receptiveness to his technique. In contrast to New York session musicians, those at Gold Star generally responded to his methods with professional respect. (Note: Keyboardist Don Randi recalled that many musicians, particularly guitarists, enjoyed working with Spector because he both understood and could perform their parts himself.) He developed a reputation for extreme fastidiousness, frequently rehearsing vocalists and instrumentalists to physical exhaustion until reaching the sound he sought. According to singer LaLa Brooks, "Phil would push the musicians to the limit, but you never saw them get upset. Some musicians in New York [...] wouldn't even go to five takes! They’d be collecting their instruments and [saying] 'We’re outta here! Because he's a nut!' But at Gold Star it was a family."

== Orchestrations ==
The Ronettes – "Be My Baby" (recorded July 1963)
Excerpt from "Be My Baby" demonstrating the Wall of Sound's layered buildup and lead vocal placed forward in the mix, later described by producer Brian Eno as "like a little bee" inside an "enormous, huge sonic picture".

Spector treated the studio as a compositional tool analogous to orchestration, to an extent, author and musician Virgil Moorefield writes, "considered excessive by some at the time". Although Spector is sometimes stereotyped as producing a continuous maximum of volume, his approach did not consist solely of dense saturation. Many engineers mistakenly believed the Wall of Sound was created by maximizing fader levels, which produced only distortion (clipping). According to music journalist David Hinckley, the term itself has sometimes misled commentators to overlook Spector's use of contrast as integral to the technique; he often incorporated open spaces, achieved either through physical pauses—as in "Be My Baby" and "Baby, I Love You"—or by reducing the arrangement's density. (Note: Moorefield similarly cited "Be My Baby" as a primary illustration of the Wall of Sound, identifying its buildup, sectional contrast, and treatment of texture and spatial placement as characteristic of Spector’s "attention to detail". Marshall Leib stated, "People who tried to duplicate [the Wall of Sound] did it wrong. They were always adding to make more sound. But it wasn't a lot of sound, not a lot of people playing a lot of notes. It was more air than sound.")

The Wall of Sound incorporated an expanded rhythm section derived from R&B traditions and structured around specific patterns for guitars, drums, and bass. Instrumentation frequently included those three in addition to keyboards and several percussive instruments, augmented by woodwind, brass, and string sections. The overall texture was reinforced through doubling, a technique in which two or more instruments, sometimes contrasting in tonal character, play in unison to produce a unified instrumental color. A typical ensemble comprised a drummer, two bass players, three or four keyboard players, four guitarists, three or four reeds, two trumpets, two trombones, and additional percussionists. Multiple players were sometimes seated at the same piano. Jeff Barry described Spector's approach as "basically a formula" involving four or five gut-string guitars playing chords; two basses performing parallel fifths; strings executing arranged melodic phrases; seven horns for punctuating accents; and percussion incorporating bells, shakers, and tambourines. Nitzsche specified four keyboards (grand piano, Wurlitzer electronic piano, tack piano, and harpsichord), together with three acoustic guitars, three basses (acoustic, electric, and six-string Danelectro), an electric guitar, three or four percussionists, and a drummer.

His orchestrations were unlike later baroque pop recordings, which employed intimate string arrangements and classical-influenced melodies with reduced blues elements. Having mentored under Leiber and Stoller, Spector adopted their approach to string sections, which were deployed with a more assertive, rhythmically punctuating role than the less articulated string styles then prevalent in pop music, alongside their introduction of Latin-American rhythms, such as the baion, into rhythm and blues. He incorporated their practice of building arrangements around acoustic guitars maintaining a consistent rhythmic pattern, and of using backing vocals strictly to support the lead vocal instead of improvising. Lieber and Stoller also layered instruments such as pianos, strings, triangle, timpani, and Latin percussion, sometimes using three to five guitars along with a drummer and multiple percussionists, and incorporated elements drawn from jazz and classical idioms. However, they rejected claiming direct influence on Spector's later work and distinguished their own production style from his technique of combining parts into a "mush".

Among other core traits were a particular backbeat, normally placed on the second and fourth beats using tom-toms with no snare and an avoidance of cymbals. The snare was tuned high and tight to project through the density of the arrangement, and struck in unison with a floor tom to reinforce the backbeat. Spector regularly instructed his guitarists to play "dumb" and limit themselves to eighth-note patterns. (Note: According to Sonny Bono, Spector's use of the word "dumb" was a shorthand reference to "the simplicity of the hook".) His use of glockenspiels formed another stylistic marker for his sound. Levine stated that Spector "never wanted to hear horns as horns", preferring instead that they shift the harmonic progression while leaving the perception of movement to the listener.

== Mixing and recording process ==
=== Setup, studio effects, and monaural layering ===
The Wall of Sound was built from live ensemble performances involving a large number of musicians playing simultaneously within the confined recording space. Spector aimed to preserve the spontaneity and cohesion of a live group performance and accepted imperfections if they contributed to the desired effect. Levine explained, "You can split a sound into a thousand tracks, but the essential Wall of Sound process remains the same—it's a room of people playing live." The room's small dimensions and lack of isolation created unavoidable microphone bleed, compounded by the instruments being recorded in close quarters with limited baffling. Levine stated, "I never wanted all the bleed between instruments — I had it, but I never wanted it — and since I had to live with it, that meant manipulating other things to lessen the effect".

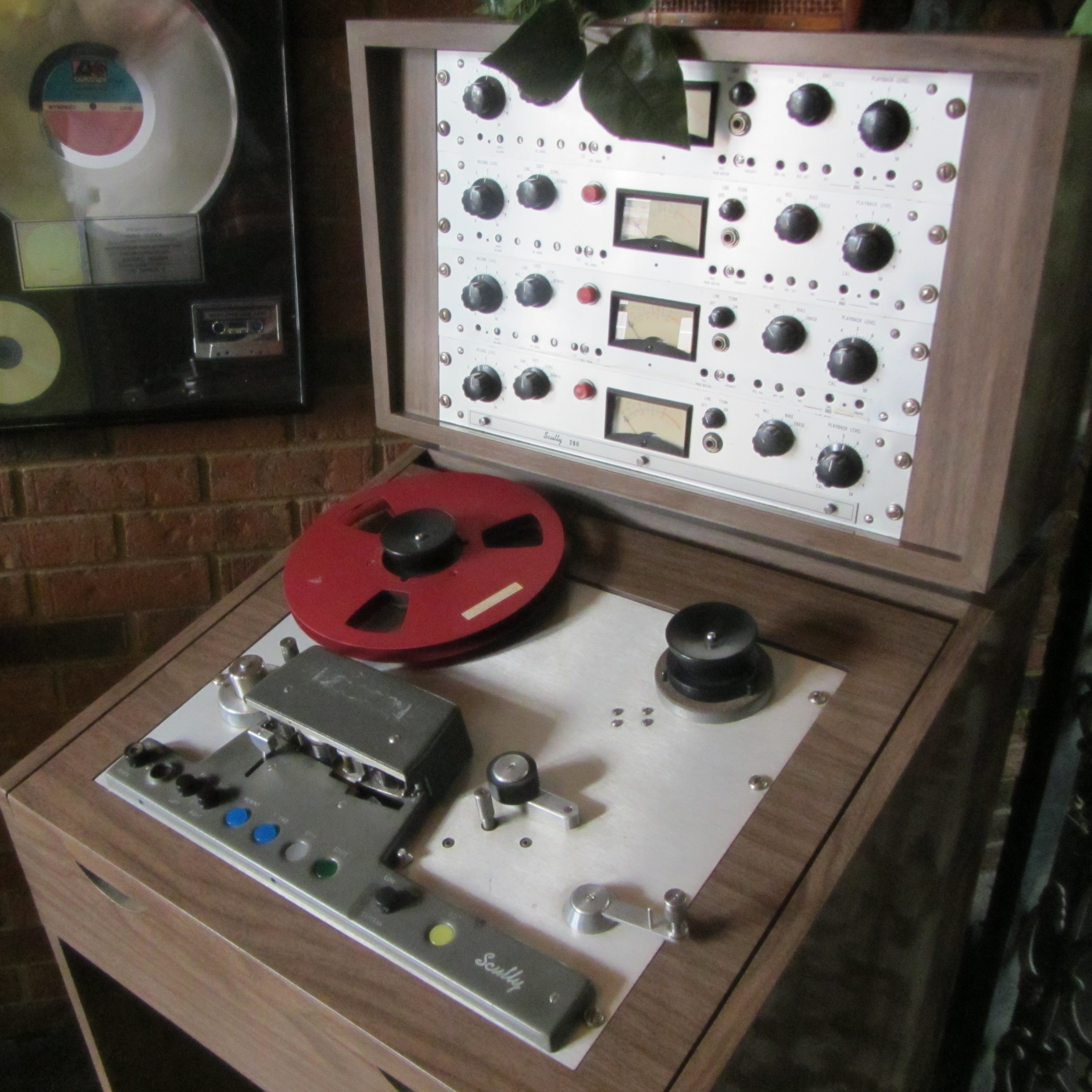
A Scully four-track 280 tape deck, similar to the model used at Gold Star after 1964.

Gold Star had a 12-input console with limited equalization capabilities. Initial sessions used only a monaural recorder and a two-track recorder. Instrumental tracks were recorded monaurally, transferred to one track of the two-track machine, with vocals recorded on the second track. These tracks were then mixed together and bounced back to the monaural recorder. By 1963, the studio had acquired an Ampex 350 three-track machine, after which the usual recording procedure involved recording basic instrumentation on the first track, vocals on the second track, and strings on the third track before mixing down to mono.

The layout of musicians within the live room remained relatively consistent across sessions: drums were positioned on the far left, pianos on the near left, percussion along the rear wall, horns on the far right, woodwinds on the center-right, and bassists near the right wall with close-miked amps. Acoustic guitars were placed in the middle of the room facing the drums.

Musically, it was terribly simple, but the way he recorded and mixed it, they’d diffuse it so that you couldn’t pick any one instrument out. Techniques like distortion and echo were not new, but Phil came along and took these to make sounds that had not been used in the past. I thought it was ingenious.

— Guitarist Barney Kessel

Spector recorded and mixed at unusually high volumes, setting the three Altec 603 monitors in the control booth to maximum playback levels, and obscured the arrangement by mixing elements into indistinct constituent parts. (Note: Levine remembered that Spector did not initially articulate his intent regarding sound combinations and offered no conceptual explanation of his technique.) He employed ambience prominently, as well as echo chamber and tape echo processing, techniques derived in part from the "Memphis sound" associated with Sun Records. (Note: Spector's use of echo was influenced directly by Lee Hazlewood, whose sessions with Duane Eddy he observed in 1959. Hazlewood had developed Eddy’s distinctive guitar sound using echo and tape delay within the studio's single-track system and improvised echo chamber.) The full mix was routed into one of two cement-lined echo chambers, accessible through a crawl hole in the rear wall of the control room, with each chamber approximately 2 by 3 feet and equipped with an 8-inch speaker and a ribbon microphone; the reverberant signal captured in the chamber was then blended back into the recording. Routing additional signal to the chamber reduced the level sent directly to the console, creating an effect distinct to Gold Star.

Both the density of players in the confined studio and the high playback volume transformed the room into an acoustic compressor, particularly for midrange frequencies. The overall effect likewise masked harmonic progression and rhythmic pulse, especially through the use of reverberation. Multiple instruments assigned the same part, with slight tuning variations, produced a chorusing or phasing effect not reproducible through electronic means.

The entire mix reduced to a single mono track further compressed the sonic image. Spector favored mono in part for its capacity to merge instrumental elements into a unified texture where the vocal line and select musical gestures were prominent within the mix. (Note: This preference stemmed in part from his admiration for Fats Domino recordings arranged by Dave Bartholomew. In the 1960s, the mono 45-rpm single was the primary format for teenage listeners and AM radio, which operated without stereo broadcasting. Although stereo technology had entered broader commercial use by 1963, it remained uncommon in early rock production. Beyond its market function, mono formed the basis of the creative assumptions of producers and musicians who had developed their practices within its constraints.) He consistently rejected stereo recording even as eight-track methods became accessible and refused to separate instrumental elements across stereo channels, stipulating that the sonic image fixed during tracking remain unchanged. (Note: An eight track recorder was available to Spector when recording at Atlantic Records in the early 1960s. According to staff producer Tom Dowd, "He had better ways available to him, but if it impaired or impeded or made him insecure, technology means nothing... You don’t make a Phil Spector a victim of technology.") Levine recalled suggesting that horns or guitars be separated, only to be told, "Absolutely not. What I hear today is what I wanna hear tomorrow, when I come back to the mix." (Note: Spector contended that the musical elements could not be reproduced in stereo with the same precision as in mono. Levine agreed: "Even today, stereo is an approximation of what’s heard in the studio. For Phil, the only sound he wanted was the sound he recorded after three hours getting everything to fit. He cared that much about it.") Due to the high playback volume, Levine would record the same performance on two tracks to reinforce the sound before erasing one for vocals.

Microphones included Electro-Voice RE15s (or "E-V 15") for pianos, percussion, and guitars; RCA 44s and E-V 15s for the horn section; and Shure SM57s for the bass amps. Drums were recorded using an RCA 77 on the kick and a Neumann U 67 as overhead. Levine used a minimal set-up on the drums due to leakage occurring in all other microphones, particularly those capturing the acoustic guitars. Due to the restricted number of inputs, he would route multiple microphones into single channels while also employing a homemade sidecar mixer. He sometimes tied the acoustic guitars, usually inaudible in the final mix, to the same input, describing them as "bricks in the wall" that did not require individual audibility. (Note: Levine recalled that at one session, after discovering that a guitar microphone was unplugged, "I said to Phil, 'You know, we're not hearing him. You may as well send him home,' and he said 'No, it sounds right. He stays.' There was no way that acoustic guitar could be heard without a microphone.")

=== Session routine ===
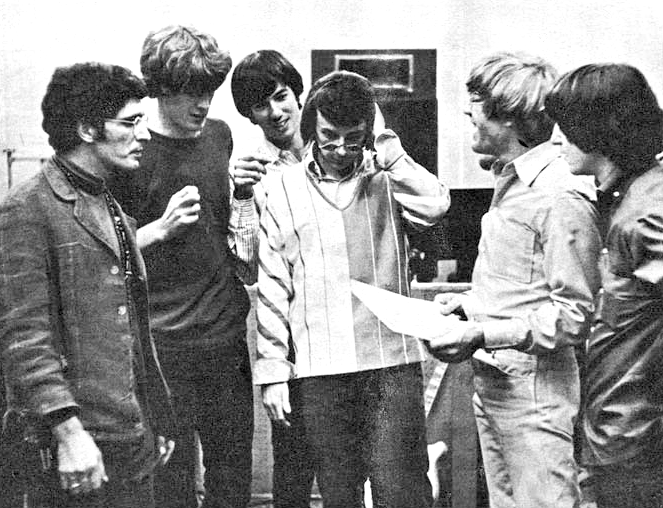
Spector (center) at Gold Star Studios with the Modern Folk Quartet (1965)

Sessions usually began late in the evening to ensure the availability of musicians who were in demand earlier in the day and to allow for extended working hours. Most of the session was spent positioning musicians, adjusting the acoustic blend, and rehearsing parts before recording began. In the absence of modern preview technologies, Spector relied on live experimentation to refine his arrangements through trial and repetition. His method combined arranging, rehearsal, and mixing; performers were required to repeat their parts for extended periods while he refined the mix. Once the musicians and microphones were set in place, he avoided giving breaks, concerned that any movement could alter the sound balance, however, breaks were occasionally permitted with the instruction not to disturb the setup.

Spector's approach reversed the standard recording practice of starting with the rhythm section of drums and bass to establish a rhythmic foundation. Instead, he began recording sessions by positioning multiple acoustic guitars in the studio to repeatedly play the foundational rhythmic figure, usually identical eighth-note chords. Requiring the guitarists to sustain their playing for hours, Howard Roberts was deterred from continued recording with Spector due to the physically demanding process and relatively simple material. He remembered, "the kind of thing Phil was into was to let all the chords ring as long as possible. You'd never take your hand off the fingerboard, just keep it down under maximum pressure. When we'd play a thing through, my hand would be about to fall off." Guitarist Dan Kessel described his own "left hand dripping blood" at the conclusion of a take.

The continuous live mixing necessitated constant attention from Spector's engineer. As new instrumental layers were added, the confined space caused difficulties in preserving the overall sonic balance, as adjusting the level of one microphone would alter the levels of others. The bass and horns were added once the guitars and pianos were cohesively integrated, followed by drums. (Note: If the combined guitars and pianos did not achieve the desired blend, he returned to refining the guitars before readjusting the pianos.) Achieving a consistent drum timbre presented a persistent challenge, with results dependent on the key being performed. Spector recalled affording "five or six hours" to the drums, and occasionally modified the bass drum resonance by using inserted objects like blankets or wood fragments. Percussive effects such as maracas, tambourines, chimes, bells, and castanets were the last instrumental layer added.

During the early 1960s, pop recordings were normally completed within a three-hour block of studio time. Spector's sessions routinely ran into overtime, particularly when tracking rhythm and horn sections, Levine speculated that Spector intentionally extended the process to induce fatigue in the musicians, believing that tired players became "subservient to the overall sound and meld together better, instead of any one or two instruments sticking out when the musicians were fresh." Once the sound balance was finalized, recording typically required no more than one or two complete takes.

Levine sometimes performed tape edits, a task Spector initially opposed due to his stated preference for "live" recording. (Note: Spector allowed tape edits following an incident in which Levine mistakenly damaged a tape segment but successfully replaced it by splicing in a duplicate passage.) Vocals were rarely recorded live with the band and instead usually followed on the second day of each session, alongside string overdubs. Levine mixed down to mono at 15 ips, with Spector absent from the control room but providing intermittent direction. (Note: Levine mixed according to his judgment, then called Spector in to critique specific adjustments before repeating the cycle.) Spector then played the recording through a small speaker approximating a car or transistor radio as a final evaluation before release.

== Development ==
=== Precursors (1958–1961) ===
We were working on the transparency of music; that was the Teddy Bears sound: you had a lot of air moving around, notes being played in the air but not directly into the mikes. Then, when we sent it all into the chamber, this air effect is what was heard—all the notes jumbled and fuzzy. This is what we recorded—not the notes. The chamber.

— Teddy Bears member Marshall Leib

In May 1958, Phil Spector, with schoolmates Marshall Leib, Harvey Goldstein, and Annette Kleinbard (later Carol Connors), recorded his songs "Don't You Worry My Little Pet" and "To Know Him Is to Love Him" at Gold Star. The group, subsequently named the Teddy Bears, released "To Know Him Is to Love Him" as a single, which topped the U.S. charts by the end of 1958. Due to Gold Star's unavailability, sessions for their first album, recorded in March 1959, occurred at Master Sound Recorders, where Spector and Leib continued experimenting with room microphone capture and, for the first time, were joined by session musicians: drummer Earl Palmer and bassist Red Callender. (Note: Howard referred to these sessions as the Wall of Sound's "construction".)

While recording the Teddy Bears album, Spector encountered Lester Sill, a prominent industry figure who managed the Coasters and co-owned multiple record labels. Sill maintained publishing partnerships with the independent producers Jerry Lieber and Mike Stoller, who had achieved success through their series of Latin-influenced R&B hits with the Coasters and the Drifters, and for their songs for Elvis Presley films. After signing Spector to a three-year contract, Sill arranged for him to observe his collaborator Lee Hazlewood’s sessions with Duane Eddy at Ramco Audio Recorders in Phoenix. Sill, who later recalled that Spector had "absorbed everything we did like a sponge", subsequently granted him autonomy to produce his own recordings. (Note: In late 1959, Spector returned to Master Sound Studios to record with session singer Ricki Page and Russ Titelman, a Fairfax High student he had mentored; the group was credited as “the Spector’s Three”. According to Mark Ribowsky, Spector’s approach for the short-lived project was "centered almost completely around the studio mixing board".)

At Sill's recommendation, he secured an apprenticeship with Leiber and Stoller, relocating to New York City in mid-1960 to contribute as a session guitarist and associate songwriter. (Note: Moorefield writes, "Spector’s first exposure to what may have inspired his famous Wall of Sound was in working for Leiber and Stoller, who pretty much ignored their charge and went about the business of making hits.") In October, Leiber delegated production duties for Ray Peterson's single "Corrina, Corrina" to Spector, whose recording session at Bell Sound Studios involved his first use of violins. Concurrently, Spector pursued songwriting collaborations with Leiber before producing tracks for additional artists and concluding his apprenticeship.

In 1961, he sought material from Don Kirshner's Aldon Music, a major publishing company whose early signings included the husband-wife teams of Gerry Goffin and Carole King alongside Barry Mann and Cynthia Weil. He acquired Goffin and King's "Every Breath I Take", which he produced for Gene Pitney at Bell Sound in June or July. (Note: Brown described the result as "Spector's most startlingly original production to date" and a leap "towards what he would later achieve with the Wall of Sound".) Another Aldon-sourced song, "I Love How You Love Me", written by Mann and Larry Kolberg, was produced by Spector for the Paris Sisters at Gold Star in July or August with the goal of surpassing his previous recordings. (Note: Brown assessed it as a spiritual successor to "To Know Him Is to Love Him", though "deeper, warmer, and more richly textured – the first true precursor to the Wall of Sound.") Released in late 1961, it reached number 5 on the Billboard charts.

=== Nitzsche, Levine, and the Wrecking Crew (1962–1966) ===
Following the dissolution of Hazlewood's partnership with Sill, Sill proposed a joint venture with Spector to establish Philles Records, enabling him with full artistic control and financial backing. By June 1962, he had recruited Jack Nitzsche, then an arranger for Hazlewood who had worked on the Paris Sisters' album, to serve as an arranger for Philles. Author David Howard writes that "Spector's penchant for grandiose sounds and excessive personnel" began in earnest with "He's a Rebel", written by Pitney and arranged by Nitzsche. The song was recorded at Gold Star on July 13 and was Larry Levine's first session under Spector. Spector enlisted the Blossoms alongside Bobby Sheen to record the song as the Crystals and recruited a rhythm section comprising eight players, double the number typically used on a rock 'n' roll session. (Note: This included guitarists Howard Roberts and Tommy Tedesco, bassists Ray Pohlman and Jimmy Bond, pianist Al DeLory, drummer Hal Blaine and saxophonist Nino Tempo. Only Roberts and Pohlman had previously recorded with Spector.)

Bob B. Soxx and the Blue Jeans – "Zip-A-Dee-Doo-Dah" (recorded August 24, 1962)
Levine considered "Zip-A-Dee-Doo-Dah" the first true Wall of Sound recording. The guitar solo was captured through bleed from room microphones rather than a direct microphone.

Impressed with the results at Gold Star, Spector returned on August 24 with an arrangement of "Zip-a-Dee-Doo-Dah", a song from the 1946 Disney film Song of the South. Levine again engineered, while the Blossoms and Sheen reteamed on vocals. This time, the personnel comprised twelve players, including three guitarists—two on acoustic, and Billy Strange on electric—three bassists, two saxophonists, a drummer, and a percussionist. (Note: The bassists included Bond on upright, Wallick Dean on Fender bass, and Carole Kaye, working at her first Spector session, on Danelectro bass. DeLory returned, joined at the same keyboard by Tempo, with Leon Russell also contributing piano. Douglas played tenor saxophone alongside baritone saxophonist Jay Migliori. The percussion was handled by Frank Capp, with Blaine limited to a bass drum.) In November, "He's a Rebel" topped the Billboard Hot 100, while "Zip-A-Dee-Doo-Dah"—the group now credited as "Bob B. Soxx and the Blue Jeans"—reached the number eight position in early 1963. From then, his working approach remained largely unchanged, and Levine was cemented as his principal engineer until 1966.

Following the Crystals' December 1962 single "He's Sure the Boy I Love", written by Mann and Weil, Spector ceased drawing material from the Brill Building until 1964. By 1963, he had become the most successful rock producer in the United States, attaining an unprecedented streak of hits with five top 10 records and five more reaching the top 40. Additional players became regular participants at sessions while he evolved the Wall of Sound over a six-month period leading to "(Today I Met) The Boy I'm Going to Marry" in March 1963. (Note: The remaining musicians who regularly joined Spector's sessions included guitarists Glen Campbell, Irv Rubin, Dennis Budimir, and Al Casey; drummer Ritchie Frost; keyboardists Don Randi, Larry Knechtel, and Mike Rubini; horn players Ollie Mitchell, Dave Wells, Lou Blackburn, and Roy Caton; and percussionists Frank Capp, Julius Wechter, Gene Estes, Victor Feldman, and Sonny Bono.) Seeking additional songwriting talent, he collaborated with Trio Music associates Ellie Greenwich and Jeff Barry, yielding their first joint effort in early 1963 with "Da Doo Ron Ron", which peaked at number three for the Crystals. (Note: Buskin proposed the song to be "[a]rguably the first really legendary 'Wall of Sound' track".) All subsequent Philles label releases carried Greenwich–Barry co-writing credits until 1964.

The Crystals – "Then He Kissed Me" (recorded July 1963)
"Then He Kissed Me" had the most prominent use of echo of any Spector recording. It was described by Mark Ribowsky as his first "truly symphonic" production, and by David Howard as the Wall of Sound reaching "full maturation".

The follow-up to "Da Doo Ron Ron", "Then He Kissed Me", was recorded in July and employed echo effects greater than on any prior Spector production. Levine recalled the particular echo effect used on the record was discovered from a technical mishap that was exploited purposely for subsequent recordings, "although I don't think we ever used more echo than on that record." Following his work with the Crystals, Spector produced the Ronettes and selected "Be My Baby", recorded that same month, for their debut with Philles. The session was his first at Gold Star that employed a full string section; upon release, the song peaked at number two. (Note: Biographer and music journalist Richard Williams wrote it "nailed the idea of the Wall of Sound to the consciousness of every teenage pop fan",. while musicologist John Covach identified “Da Doo Ron Ron”, “Then He Kissed Me”, and “Be My Baby” as "the most important Wall of Sound hits".)

Spector continued recording the Ronettes through 1964. Although his output had received greater industry attention, his commercial performance weakened amid shifting trends in popular music. (Note: According to Howard, Spector's reluctance to adapt to stereo recording had contributed to the declining chart success.) "Baby I Love You", released in January 1964, was the last Philles single co-written by Greenwich and Barry until 1966, following a dispute from Spector over their song "Chapel of Love". He subsequently partnered with the Hill & Range writing duo Vini Poncia and Peter Andreoli, whose "(The Best Part of) Breakin' Up" and "Do I Love You?" he recorded as the Ronettes' next singles. "Do I Love You?" incorporated Motown-inspired horns, which Poncia described as Spector "trying to move out, not stay confined. [...] The man was growing up."

After Spector reteamed with Mann and Weil for the Ronettes' "Walking in the Rain", they composed "You've Lost That Lovin' Feelin'" for the Righteous Brothers’ Philles debut. Recorded between August and November 1964, it exceeded Spector's prior work in length and musical ambition. Gene Page arranged due to Nitzsche's unavailability. (Note: Other changes to the personnel included Palmer replacing Blaine on drums, and Barney Kessel, unfamiliar with rock sessions and Spector's methods, performing high-register parts on six-string bass alongside Carol Kaye and Ray Pohlman.) Writer Tom Wolfe, in an article published by the New York Herald Tribune in January 1965, described Spector as "an electronic maestro [...] coming out with what is known throughout the industry as "'the Spector sound.'" By February, the single had become the longest song to top the Billboard charts. Spector later regarded the record as his finest work with Philles. Levine likewise called it "the greatest record" that he contributed to and the point when Spector first became preoccupied with “the sound” itself, rather than "what the song said, what the song needed".

Phil kept reaching to go beyond where he had been previously. I think he got to that point before the technology was able to keep up with him on "River Deep" [...]

— Engineer Larry Levine

Throughout 1965, Spector dissolved many of his professional associations while most other Philles acts sustained a decline in popularity. (Note: By mid-1965, the label's output was concentrated almost exclusively on the Righteous Brothers. The Crystals had moved to United Artists, Poncia and Andreoli transitioned to Red Bird Records, and the Blossoms largely reverted to session work. Nitzsche later recalled that by the time of the Ronettes’ follow-up recording "Born to Be Together" (1965), Spector remarked that "it's all over". Nitzsche attributed this to a number of factors, including the Beatles' emergence: "We had done it so many times. The musicians were changing. They didn't want to work overtime for a deal. Everybody. It just wasn't the same spirit anymore.") He regarded "River Deep, Mountain High" as a final attempt, following a sequence from “He's a Rebel” to “Be My Baby” to “You've Lost That Lovin’ Feelin’” in which each release leaped in scale and ambition. He conceived the single for the Ike and Tina Turner Revue as a summative statement of the Wall of Sound and returned to Barry and Greenwich to fulfill these aims. Recorded in February and March 1966 over five sessions, the production cost more than $22,000. The single charted briefly in the U.S., peaking at number 88, leading to his temporary withdrawal from the industry. Levine commented, "Phil was always looking to move on to the next plateau, until there just wasn't a plateau there to move on to." The Ike & Tine Turner sessions marked Spector's last in collaboration with Nitzsche.

=== Final Gold Star recordings (1969–1979) ===
Having left Gold Star in 1967 to become chief engineer at A&M Studios, Levine was instrumental to Spector resuming sessions there. In February 1969, Spector recorded the Ronettes' single "You Came, You Saw, You Conquered", received with poor sales; according to Brown, he struggled to recreate the earlier Gold Star Wall of Sound. Levine believed the "Wall of Sound was indigenous to Gold Star [...] Once he left Gold Star it was over."

In late 1973, Spector reassembled the Wrecking Crew for the recording of John Lennon’s album Rock ’n’ Roll, recorded at A&M, and formulated what drummer Hal Blaine termed "a new Wall of Sound". He returned to Gold Star for sessions with Cher in early 1974 and assembled more players than he typically had in the 1960s while reorienting his style toward a more plaintive musical aesthetic. Continuing in this style, he produced Dion's Born to Be with You at Gold Star in mid-1975, with Stan Ross engineering and, after a year's hiatus, Leonard Cohen's Death of a Ladies' Man, partly recorded at Gold Star with Levine engineering. His further work there with Levine and the Wrecking Crew included recordings with the Paley Brothers, left unreleased, and the Ramones, whose End of the Century (1980) incurred production costs of about $200,000 and became the band's highest-charting album.

Gold Star closed in 1983 and was destroyed by fire in 1984. In the 1990s, Spector initiated a reunion session with the Wrecking Crew at Studio 56, the former site of Gold Star competitor Radio Recorders. Dissatisfied with the results produced by the modern setup and the facility's unsuitability for large ensemble live recording, he halted the project. In Wrecking Crew biographer Kent Hartman's description: "If this studio was set up this way, then they probably all were. Good old Gold Star had been the last of its kind."

== Early usages by other producers ==
A widespread influence on subsequent rock and pop music, Spector's commercial success led to elements of the Wall of Sound becoming standard within rock sessions. The Wrecking Crew received employment on imitative productions throughout the 1960s. Dozens of records in its style were released and many producers sought to closely replicate the sound, although none adhered strictly to his method. (Note: Spector had deliberately allowed for portions of the orchestration to become inaudible, an element, Levine recalled, some imitating producers resisted.) Musicologist John Covach writes that the obfuscated arrangements rendered his songs "almost impossible to cover and added to the mystery of his technique". His impact extended to France, where Wall of Sound-inspired pop recordings formed part of the region's nascent yé-yé genre.

At Motown, early Holland-Dozier-Holland releases copied Spector's sound, including the Marvelettes’ (as the Darnells) "Too Hurt to Cry, Too Much in Love to Say Goodbye” (1963). While later releases departed from the Wall of Sound style, their Supremes material retained Spector-derived characteristics, particularly their use of strings. Berry Gordy also used the label as a brand and, like Spector, relied on recurring studio personnel: the Funk Brothers and the Andantes.

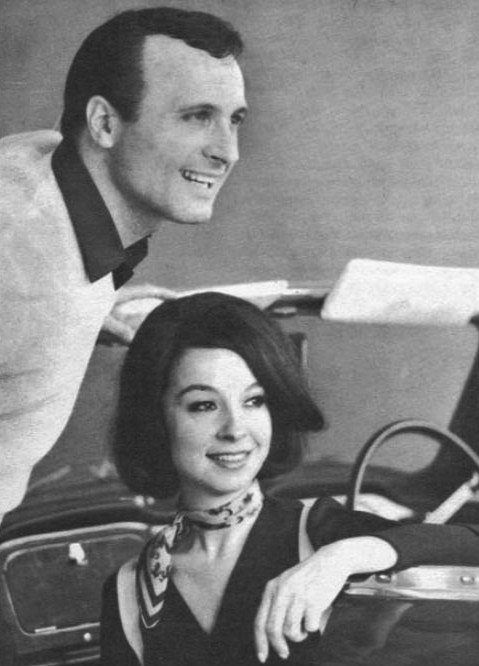
Nino Tempo and April Stevens were among Spector collaborators who had standalone success with his approach in the 1960s

Spector's other collaborators and songwriting partners, including Nino Tempo, Sonny Bono, Jack Nitzsche, Gerry Goffin, and others, adopted elements of the approach in their own projects. Jackie DeShannon's 1963 hits "Needles and Pins", co-written by Bono and Nitzsche, and "When You Walk in the Room" merged folk-rock with a Wall of Sound-style arrangement. Shadow Morton's 1964 production of "Leader of the Pack", recorded with the Shangri-Las and co-written by Greenwich and Barry, was designed as a more operatic variation of the sound. Sonny & Cher had a string of successful singles from 1965 through 1967, beginning with "I Got You Babe" (number one) and "Baby Don't Go" (number eight), recorded with Spector's players. (Note: Bono described the sound as "inspired and influenced by Phil" and stated, "I definitely ripped off his style of recording.") In 1966, Tempo, as part of a music duo with sister April Stevens, transitioned to a contemporary pop, Wall of Sound-derived approach on the top 40 hits "All Strung Out" and "I Can't Go on Livin' Baby Without You", recorded with engineer Bones Howe and the Wrecking Crew. After the Righteous Brothers' association with Spector ended, they achieved a chart-topping hit with the Mann-Weil song "(You're My) Soul and Inspiration”, a copy of his style. Nitzsche recreated the Wall of Sound for Judy Henske's late-1960s singles and for the 1967 album by the Cake.

Spector started the whole thing. He was the first one to use the studio. But I've gone beyond him now.

— Brian Wilson, c. 1966

Beach Boys leader Brian Wilson was influenced significantly by Spector's productions, considering him a primary model for his own work as a record producer. (Note: As the band's leader during their 1960s peak, he worked in Los Angeles studios with many of the same musicians used on Spector's recordings. and, unlike Spector, remained an on-record performer on the Beach Boys releases he wrote, arranged, and produced. Wilson also wrote songs for other artists, including Jan and Dean and the Honeys, the latter inspired by the Ronettes. Spector invited Wilson to sit in on his sessions and, in turn, sometimes visited Beach Boys sessions. Wilson observed Spector's recording process, later recalling, "I kind of learned everything he was doing. I think I maybe picked up more than he thought I would.") He seldom used Gold Star for his own recordings, developing a similar Wall of Sound at Western Studio with engineer Chuck Britz. By 1966, Wilson was a leading figure in the Los Angeles music scene, surpassing Spector's standing there, and produced Pet Sounds, a concept album centered on and expanding Spector's technique. (Note: Wilson later called the album’s title an homage to Spector’s initials. According to Brown, the matched initials may be coincidental, given that bandmate Mike Love has been credited with suggesting the title. Wilson scrapped the intended follow-up Smile in 1967 and his preoccupation with surpassing his own work and Spector's, combined with other factors, led to a personal and professional decline spanning decades.)

In Britain, Andrew Oldham viewed Spector as his model and inspiration, and was mentored by him during a 1963 trip to America.' Oldham first adopted the Wall of Sound on records with Cleo Sylvestre and with the Andrew Oldham Orchestra before applying it to the Rolling Stones. (Note: Bill Wyman, who thought unfavorably of Oldham's early efforts, later described the sound as a "wall of noise".) Nitzsche also applied Spector's technique into work with the band, serving as arranger, performing, and helping to produce their mid-1960s sessions at RCA Studios in Los Angeles, including the albums Aftermath (1966) and Between the Buttons (1967). The Beatles were influenced by the Wall of Sound in songs such as Lennon's "Tell Me Why" (1964) and the Paul McCartney-led outtake "That Means a Lot" and 1967 single "Hello, Goodbye".

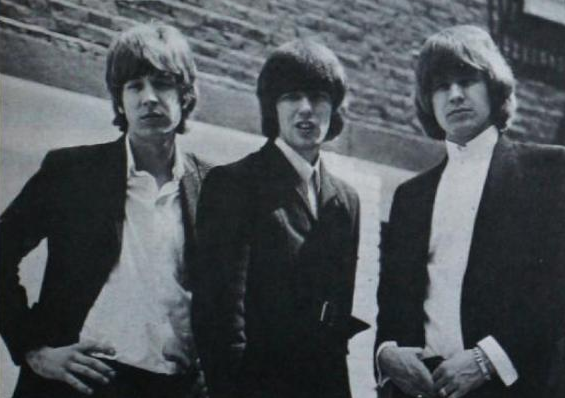
The Walker Brothers (pictured) and Dusty Springfield had series of Wall of Sound hits in the UK under producer Johnny Franz

English producer Johnny Franz supervised mid-1960s recordings for singer Dusty Springfield and American pop trio the Walker Brothers that applied the Wall of Sound. (Note: Springfield’s 1964 album Stay Awhile/I Only Want to Be with You was described by critic Richie Unterberger as Britain's "most credible approximation" of the Wall of Sound.) Influenced especially by Spector's Righteous Brothers productions, the Walker Brothers enjoyed UK chart success with "Make It Easy on Yourself" (number one, 1965), "My Ship Is Coming In" (number three, 1966), and "The Sun Ain't Gonna Shine Anymore” (number one, 1966).

A number of popular music developments after the mid-1960s drew from the Wall of Sound, including psychedelia and the Beatles' 1967 album Sgt. Pepper's Lonely Hearts Club Band. Spector and Wilson's innovations also became a key component of the production style associated with the contemporary form of soft rock later termed "sunshine pop". In 1968, English musician Billy Nicholls recorded Would You Believe, an album whose Andrew Oldham-helmed production used a partly Wall of Sound approach influenced by Pet Sounds.

== Later offshoots ==
=== Post–1960s ===
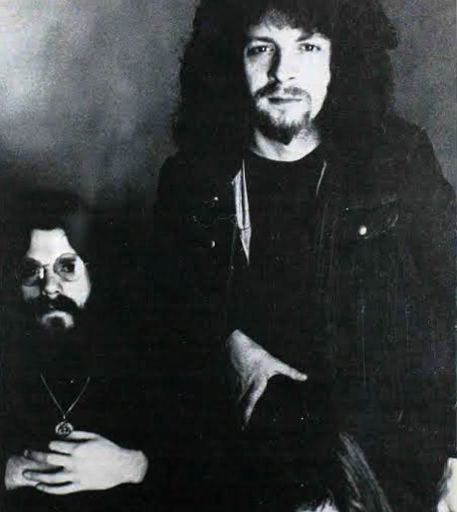
Roy Wood (left) and Jeff Lynne (right) were among producers of the 1970s who drew from Spector's techniques.

After the 1960s, it became more common for instruments to be recorded separately through overdubbing and multi-track isolation. In the early 1970s, the Philadelphia soul genre was an exception, adapting Spector's technique by recording large ensembles live with R&B-influenced orchestration. Musicologist Andrew Blake extended the "indirect" influence of the Wall of Sound on Philadelphia soul to associated "soul-pop subgenres such as the symphonic soul of the O'Jays". English group Wizzard, led by Electric Light Orchestra co-founder Roy Wood, combined rock 'n' roll with Wall of Sound pastiche on singles such as their 1972 debut record "Ball Park Incident" and a string of follow-up hits over 1973. English singer Dave Edmunds' 1973 Wall of Sound rendition of "Born to Be With You" (number five in the UK) spurred Spector to later produce his own version for Dion. Swedish producer Michael B. Tretow used the Wall of Sound as the basis for his productions with ABBA, beginning with “Ring Ring” (1973) and “Waterloo” (1974).

Among other 1970s acts who modeled their studio approach on Spector were the New York Dolls, whose first two albums were produced by Spector-influenced producers Todd Rundgren and Shadow Morton, respectively. Bruce Springsteen's 1975 album Born to Run merged various rock influences with a Wall of Sound–inspired production developed with producer Mike Appel and engineer Jimmy Iovine, the latter having worked with Spector on one occasion. Meat Loaf's 1977 album Bat Out of Hell, produced by Rundgren and engineered by Iovine, employed the technique on songs like "You Took the Words Right Out of My Mouth". In Japan, the Wall of Sound was adapted by producers and musicians such as Eiichi Ohtaki and Tatsuro Yamashita; Ohtaki developed a similar style he called the "Niagara Sound", named in reference to the Wall of Sound and exemplfiied on his 1981 album A Long Vacation.

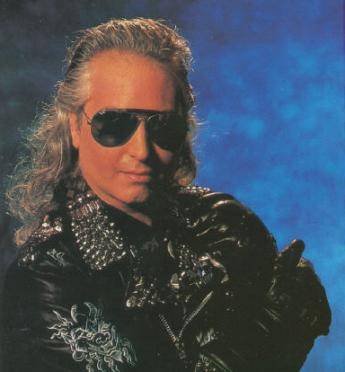
Described by Rolling Stone editors as "the Phil Spector of the Eighties and Nineties", Spector later dismissed Jim Steinman as a "bad clone of yours truly", a remark that Steinman welcomed.

By 1979, the use of compression had become common on the radio, marking the trend that led to the loudness war in the 1980s. By the 1980s, synthesizers, drum machines, and other advancements in recording technology had enabled piecemeal overdubbing by one or two players, often supplied by producers and arrangers themselves. Consequently, the practice of recording large ensembles live in one room reduced significantly. Bat Out of Hell co-writer Jim Steinman, who was influenced by Spector's "Wagnerian" approach, enjoyed further success with "an alternate-universe Wall of Sound" configured for acts such as Air Supply, the Sisters of Mercy, Bonnie Tyler, and Celine Dion throughout the 1980s and 1990s. In 1988, Irish composer Enya combined a Wall of Sound approach with layering techniques drawn from German producer-engineer Conny Plank. Working with producer-arranger Nicky Ryan, whose influences included Spector and the Beach Boys, she achieved significant commercial success with the album Watermark and lead single "Orinoco Flow".

Girl groups from the late 1990s onward, including the Spice Girls, Girls Aloud, Destiny's Child, and the Pussycat Dolls, as well as alternative groups like the Pipettes, Vivian Girls, and the Dum Dum Girls, derived their sound from 1960s girl groups and particularly the Wall of Sound. Leading groups from the Japanese Shibuya-kei movement of the 1990s also referenced the Wall of Sound among their influences, sharing a similarly elaborate production ethos.

=== Alternative/noise rock and dream pop ===
Cocteau Twins – "Musette and Drums" (1983)
In the 1980s, bands such as Cocteau Twins reconfigured the Wall of Sound using guitars and digital tools in place of a live orchestra. The Quietus contributor John Doran likened the group's "Musette and Drums" to an updating of Spector's sound.

Indie music of the 1980s was marked by a preoccupation with noise, especially white noise and volume, a tendency that author Matthew Bannister traces to the Wall of Sound, punk rock, and 1960s psychedelic drone. American indie bands R.E.M. and Hüsker Dü, together with the New Zealand Flying Nun label roster and British acts such as the Smiths, the Jesus and Mary Chain, My Bloody Valentine, and Spacemen 3, all employed reverberation to a significant extent. Bannister cites their use of jangle, drone, and reverb as a "contemporary equivalent" of the Wall of Sound that was also "historically rooted" in the "1960s psychedelic and garage rock" exemplified by the Byrds' "Eight Miles High" (1966). (Note: The Smiths' guitarist Johnny Marr cited Spector as a principal influence, drawing from Brill Building songwriters and applying Wall of Sound-derived techniques to his guitar and arrangement style. The Jesus and Mary Chain's debut album Psychocandy (1985) opened with a reference to the drum part from "Be My Baby" and the band aspired to emulate the Wall of Sound through layered guitar overdubs, adopting a DIY approach that relied on guitar feedback instead of orchestration.)

"Dream pop" and "shoegazing" were used by the British music press at the end of the 1980s as umbrella terms for local strands of post-punk. The category was broad and typified by digitally processed guitar signals, as well as an engagement with "the sheer physicality of sound", an aesthetic indebted to Spector and Wilson, among other figures, according to author Nathan Wiseman-Trowse. Cocteau Twins became the principal model for the use of layered guitar textures in dream pop, an "almost Spectoresque wall of sound" he attributed to co-founder Robin Guthrie, who acknowledged their use of deep ambience as consciously referencing Spector. (Note: Guthrie stated in a 2024 interview, "I think there was something of a Phil Spector vibe that I was trying to channel. It wasn’t that I wanted to sound like his records in the ’60s, but more that I wanted the sound of my records to give you the same kind of chill and to sound equally massive.”) Shoegaze, an alternative rock subgenre characterized by loud, distorted guitars that masked vocals, also drew from the Wall of Sound, such that Bannister paralleled My Bloody Valentine frontman Kevin Shields’ "painstaking" recording method to Spector's in both "sound and ambition". (Note: Wiseman-Trowse further places My Bloody Valentne, together with Cocteau Twins and the Jesus and Mary Chain, as influences on bands later grouped under dream pop, including Lush, Ride, Catherine Wheel, and Slowdive.)

== List of charting records ==
This is a list of charting songs described as Wall of Sound recordings or similar, excluding those produced by Spector.

Year	Artist	Song	US	UK
1963	Jackie DeShannon	"Needles and Pins"	84	—
1963	The Four Pennies	"When the Boy's Happy (The Girl's Happy Too)"	95	—
1963	The Supremes	"When the Lovelight Starts Shining Through His Eyes"	23	37
1963	Dusty Springfield	"I Only Want to Be with You"	12	4
1963	Jackie DeShannon	"When You Walk in the Room"	99	—
1964	The Supremes	"Run, Run, Run"	93	—
1964	Dusty Springfield	"Stay Awhile"	38	13
1965	The Walker Brothers	"Love Her"	—	20
1965	Sonny & Cher	"Just You"	20	—
1965	Sonny & Cher	"I Got You Babe"	1	1
1965	The Beach Boys	"Then I Kissed Her"	—	4
1965	The Walker Brothers	"Make It Easy on Yourself"	16	1
1965	Sonny & Cher	"Baby Don't Go"	8	11
1965	The Walker Brothers	"My Ship Is Coming In"	63	3
1966	The Walker Brothers	"The Sun Ain't Gonna Shine (Anymore)"	13	1
1966	The Righteous Brothers	"(You're My) Soul and Inspiration"	1	15
1966	The Beach Boys	"Wouldn't It Be Nice"	8	—
1966	Nino Tempo & April Stevens	"All Strung Out"	26	—
1966	The Beach Boys	"Good Vibrations"	1	1
1966	P. J. Proby	"I Can't Make It Alone"	—	37
1967	The Walker Brothers	"Walking in the Rain"	—	26
1973	ABBA	"Ring Ring"	—	32
1973	Wizzard	"See My Baby Jive"	—	1
1973	Dave Edmunds	"Born to Be with You"	—	5
1973	Wizzard	"Angel Fingers (A Teen Ballad)"	—	1
1973	Elton John	"Step into Christmas"	56	8
1973	Wizzard	"I Wish It Could Be Christmas Everyday"	—	4
1974	The Rubettes	"Sugar Baby Love"	37	1
1974	ABBA	"Waterloo"	6	1
1974	Lynsey de Paul	"Ooh I Do"	—	25
1975	Bay City Rollers	"Bye, Bye, Baby (Baby Goodbye)"	—	1
1975	Bruce Springsteen	"Born to Run"	23	16
1976	Billy Joel	"Say Goodbye to Hollywood"	17	39
1983	Tracey Ullman	"They Don’t Know"	8	2
1984	The Alan Parsons Project	"Don't Answer Me"	15	58
1984	Siouxsie and the Banshees	"Dazzle"	—	33
1984	Tracey Ullman	"Sun Glasses"	—	18
1994	Mariah Carey	"All I Want for Christmas Is You"	1	1
1995	McAlmont & Butler	"Yes"	—	8
2002	Rhianna	"Oh Baby"	—	18

== See also ==
- Art pop
- Artistic control
- KISS principle
- Overproduction

== Bibliography ==
- Bannister, Matthew (2007). White Boys, White Noise: Masculinities and 1980s Indie Guitar Rock. Ashgate Publishing. ISBN 978-0-7546-8803-7.
- Blake, Andrew (2009). "Recording practices and the role of the producer". In Cook, Nicholas; Clarke, Eric; Leech-Wilkinson, Daniel (eds.). The Cambridge Companion to Recorded Music. Cambridge University Press. ISBN 978-1-139-82796-6.
- Brown, Mick (2007) [2006]. Tearing Down the Wall of Sound: The Rise and Fall of Phil Spector. London: Bloomsbury. ISBN 978-1-4000-4219-7.
- Cogan, Jim; Clark, William (2003). Temples of Sound: Inside the Great Recording Studios. San Francisco: Chronicle Books. ISBN 9780811833943.
- Covach, John (2012). What's That Sound? An Introduction to Rock and Its History (3rd ed.). New York: W. W. Norton & Company. ISBN 9780393912043.
- Edmondson, Jacqueline, ed. (2013). Music in American Life: An Encyclopedia of the Songs, Styles, Stars, and Stories that Shaped our Culture. ABC-CLIO. ISBN 978-0-313-39348-8.
- Eisenberg, Evan (2005). The Recording Angel: Music, Records and Culture from Aristotle to Zappa. New Haven: Yale University Press. ISBN 9780300099041.
- Granata, Charles L. (2003). Wouldn't It Be Nice: Brian Wilson and the Making of the Beach Boys' Pet Sounds. Chicago: Chicago Review Press. ISBN 1556525079.
- Hartman, Kent (2012). The Wrecking Crew: The Inside Story of Rock and Roll's Best-Kept Secret (1st ed.). Thomas Dunne Books. ISBN 978-0312619749.
- Howard, David N. (2004). Sonic Alchemy: Visionary Music Producers and Their Maverick Recordings. Hal Leonard Corporation. ISBN 978-0-634-05560-7.
- Janovitz, Bill (2013). Rocks Off: 50 Tracks That Tell the Story of the Rolling Stones. St. Martin's Press. ISBN 978-1-250-02631-6.
- MacLeod, Sean (2017). Phil Spector: Sound of the Sixties. Lanham: Rowman & Littlefield. ISBN 978-1-4422-6705-3.
- Moorefield, Virgil (2005). The Producer as Composer: Shaping the Sounds of Popular Music. Massachusetts: MIT Press. ISBN 0262134578.
- Prendergast, Mark J. (2000). The Ambient Century: From Mahler to Trance – The Evolution of Sound in the Electronic Age. London: Bloomsbury. ISBN 0747542139.
- Ribowsky, Mark (2006) [1989]. He's a Rebel: Phil Spector – Rock and Roll's Legendary Producer. Cambridge, MA: Da Capo Press. ISBN 978-0-306-81471-6.
- Starr, Larry (2007) [2006]. American Popular Music: From Minstrelsy to MP3 (2nd ed.). New York: Oxford University Press. ISBN 9780195300536.
- Stanley, Bob (2013). Yeah Yeah Yeah: The Story of Modern Pop. London: Faber and Faber. ISBN 9780393242690.
- Thompson, Dave (2003). Wall of Pain: The Biography of Phil Spector. London: Sanctuary. ISBN 978-1-86074-543-0.
- Toop, David (1995). Ocean of Sound: Aether Talk, Ambient Sound and Imaginary Worlds. London and New York: Serpent's Tail. ISBN 978-1-85242-743-6. OCLC 1150927269.
- Warwick, Jacqueline C. (2007). Girl Groups, Girl Culture: Popular Music and Identity in the 1960s. New York: Routledge. ISBN 9780415971126.
- Williams, Richard (2003) [1972]. Phil Spector: Out of His Head (illustrated, revised ed.). London: Omnibus. ISBN 9780711998643.
- Wiseman-Trowse, Nathan (2008). Performing Class in British Popular Music. Basingstoke: Palgrave Macmillan. ISBN 978-0-230-21949-6.
- Zak, Albin J. (2001). The Poetics of Rock: Cutting Tracks, Making Records. Berkeley: University of California Press. ISBN 9780520232242.
