= Three Week Hero =

Studio album by P.J. Proby
- Released: April 8, 1969
- Recorded: September 1968
- Studios: Olympic Studios, London
- Genres: Rock, pop
- Length: 47:41
- Label: Liberty
- Producer: Steve Rowland

P.J. Proby chronology
Believe It or Not (1968)	Three Week Hero (1969)	California License (1970)

Professional ratings
Review scores
Source	Rating
Allmusic	2.5/5 stars

Three Week Hero is an album released by rock singer P.J. Proby on April 8, 1969, by Liberty Records. The album contains a mixture of dramatic pop, blues, rock, and country style songs. While it did not succeed commercially, it is best remembered today as the first time all four members of Led Zeppelin recorded together in the studio. The album was reissued on CD in 1994.

== Track listing ==
All tracks arranged by John Paul Jones; except where indicated

1. "Three Week Hero" (John Stewart) – 2:56
2. "The Day That Lorraine Came Down" (Kenny Young) – 3:15
3. "Little Friend" (Robin Gair, Peter Mason) – 4:01
4. "Empty Bottles" (Albert Hammond, Mike Hazlewood) – 2:53
5. "Reflections (Of Your Face)" (Amory Kane; arranged by Reg Tilsley) – 5:14
6. "Won't Be Long" (J. Leslie McFarland) – 3:41
7. "Sugar Mama" (Abe Woodley, Kenny Young) – 2:50
8. "I Have a Dream" (Terry Hensley, Alec Wilder) – 4:45
9. "It's Too Good to Last" (Baker, Stephens) – 3:14
10. "New Directions" (Albert Hammond, Mike Hazlewood) – 3:46
11. "Today I Killed a Man" (Roger Cook, Roger Greenaway) – 3:24
12. "Medley: It's So Hard to Be a Nigger/Jim's Blues/George Wallace is Rollin' in This Mornin'" (Mable Hillery/Traditional; arranged by Steve Rowland) – 7:38

== Personnel ==
- P.J. Proby – vocals

Additional musicians

- Stan Barrett – percussion
- John Bonham – drums, percussion, conga
- Clem Cattini – drums
- Alan Hawkshaw – keyboards
- The Jericho (The Family Dogg with Bob Henry) – backing vocals on "Won't Be Long" and "I Have a Dream"
- John Paul Jones – bass guitar, keyboards, arrangements
- Amory Kane – acoustic guitar, strings
- Dennis Lopez – percussion
- Jimmy Page – acoustic guitar, electric guitar, pedal steel
- Alan Parker – electric guitar
- Robert Plant – harmonica, tambourine, backing vocals

Technical personnel

- Spencer Leigh – liner notes
- Gustav Karl Moody – art direction, cover design
- Steve Rowland – arrangement, production
- Steve Thomas – art direction
- Anthony Lloyd-Parker – photography
- Mike Weighell and John Mackswith – engineering

== Additional notes ==
The song "Sugar Mama" recorded by Led Zeppelin at Morgan Studios in 1969, is not the same "Sugar Mama" recorded on this album.

Catalogue: Liberty 83219
