= Best of the EMI Years 1961–1972 =

2008 album featuring P.J. Proby

The Best of the EMI Years: 1961-1972

Greatest hits album by P. J. Proby
- Released: June 16, 2008
- Recorded: 1961–1972
- Genres: Pop, easy listening, rhythm and blues, soul, rock
- Length: 77:20
- Label: EMI

P. J. Proby chronology
20th Century Hits (2005)	The Best of the EMI Years: 1961-1972 (2008)

Professional ratings
Review scores
Source	Rating
Allmusic	2013

The Best of the EMI Years: 1961-1972 is a compilation album released in 2008 celebrating the career of P. J. Proby.

== Overview ==
This P. J. Proby collection is the first to be released by EMI in 10 years. The project was devised as a way of celebrating Proby's 70th birthday in November 2008. It compiles some of his biggest and best recordings released for the EMI Group between 1961 and 1972. Included are international chart hits, key album tracks, rare B-sides, fan-favourites, and 2 previously unreleased songs ("Delilah" and Jim Ford's "I’m Ahead If I Can Quit While I’m Behind").

The album includes a number of different producers and songwriters including Dick Glasser, Charles Blackwell, Jackie DeShannon, Randy Newman, Jack Nitzsche, Ron Richards, Les Reed, and Jim Ford.

== Track listing ==
1. "Try to Forget Her" (Dick Glasser)
2. "Hold Me" (Jack Little, Dave Oppenheim, Ira Schuster)
3. "Cuttin' In" (Johnny "Guitar" Watson)
4. "Somewhere" (Leonard Bernstein, Stephen Sondheim)
5. "Just Like Him" (Jackie DeShannon)
6. "Answer Me" (Gerhard Winkler, Fred Rauch, Carl Sigman)
7. "What's on Your Mind" (Nick De Caro)
8. "I Don't Want to Hear It Anymore" (Randy Newman)
9. "My Prayer" (Georges Boulanger, Jimmy Kennedy)
10. "Mission Bell" (William Michael, Jesse Hodges)
11. "If I Loved You" (Richard Rodgers, Oscar Hammerstein II)
12. "Maria" (Leonard Bernstein, Stephen Sondheim)
13. "Quando Tornera" (Gentile, Lentini)
14. "I Can’t Make It Alone" [Alternate Mono Single Version] (Gerry Goffin, Carole King)
15. "Niki Hoeky" (Pat Vegas, Lolly Vegas, Jim Ford)
16. "Mama Told Me Not To Come" (Randy Newman)
17. "Give Me Time" (Alberto Morina, Amedeo Tommasim, Peter Callander, Pietro Melfa)
18. "I’m Comin’ Home" (Les Reed, Barry Mason)
19. "And The Sun Will Shine" (The Bee Gees)
20. "Delilah" (Les Reed, Barry Mason)
21. "Today I Killed A Man (I Didn’t Know)" (Roger Cook, Roger Greenaway)
22. "Daddy's Home" (William Henry Miller, James Sheppard)
23. "I’m Ahead If I Can Quit While I’m Behind" (Jim Ford)
24. "Clown Shoes" (James Marcus Smith)
25. "We'll Meet Again" (Hughie Charles, Ross Parker)
