= Every Breath You Take =

1983 single by the Police

Single by the Police

from the album Synchronicity
- B-side: "Murder by Numbers"
- Released: 20 May 1983
- Recorded: December 1982 – February 1983
- Studio: AIR (Salem, Montserrat)
- Genre: New wave; soft rock; pop
- Length: 3:56 (single version); 4:13 (album version)
- Label: A&M (AM 117)
- Songwriter: Sting
- Producers: The Police; Hugh Padgham

The Police singles chronology
"Secret Journey" (1982)	"Every Breath You Take" (1983)	"Wrapped Around Your Finger" (1983)

Audio sample
- file; help

Music video
- "Every Breath You Take" on YouTube

"Every Breath You Take" is a song by the English rock band the Police from their fifth and final studio album Synchronicity (1983). Written by Sting, the single was the biggest American and Canadian hit of 1983, topping the Billboard Hot 100 singles chart for eight weeks (the band's only No. 1 hit on that chart), and the Canadian RPM chart for two weeks. Their fifth UK No. 1, "Every Breath You Take" topped the UK singles chart for four weeks. It also reached the top 10 in numerous other countries. In May 2019, the song was recognised by BMI as being the most played song in radio history.

"Every Breath You Take" is the Police's and Sting's signature song, and in 2010, it was estimated to generate between a quarter and a third of Sting's music publishing income. At the 26th Annual Grammy Awards, "Every Breath You Take" was nominated for three Grammy Awards, including Song of the Year, Best Pop Performance by a Duo or Group with Vocals, and Record of the Year, winning in the first two categories. For the song, Sting received the 1983 Ivor Novello Award for Best Song Musically and Lyrically from the British Academy of Songwriters, Composers and Authors (BASCA).

In the 1983 Rolling Stone critics' and readers' poll, "Every Breath You Take" was voted the "Song of the Year". In the United States, the song was the best-selling single of 1983 and the fifth-best-selling single of the decade. Billboard ranked it as the No. 1 song for 1983. "Every Breath You Take" was ranked No. 305 on the Rolling Stone list of the 500 Greatest Songs of All Time and is included in The Rock and Roll Hall of Fame's 500 Songs that Shaped Rock and Roll. It also ranked number 25 on Billboard's Hot 100 All-Time Top Songs. In 2008, Q magazine named the song among the top 10 British Songs of the 1980s. In 2015, "Every Breath You Take" was voted by the British public as The Nation's Favourite 1980s number one in a UK-wide poll for ITV.

== Origins and songwriting ==
To escape the public eye, Sting retreated to the Caribbean. He started writing the song at Ian Fleming's writing desk on the Goldeneye estate in Oracabessa Bay, Jamaica. The lyrics are the words of a possessive lover who is watching "every breath you take; every move you make". Sting recalled:

I woke up in the middle of the night with that line in my head, sat down at the piano and had written it in half an hour. The tune itself is generic, an aggregate of hundreds of others, but the words are interesting. It sounds like a comforting love song. I didn't realise at the time how sinister it is. I think I was thinking of Big Brother, surveillance and control.

When asked why he appears angry in the music video, Sting told BBC Radio 2, "I think the song is very, very sinister and ugly and people have actually misinterpreted it as being a gentle little love song, when it's quite the opposite. Hence so." Gary T. Marx, sociologist and scholar of surveillance studies, wrote in 1988 that, while the song was "a love rather than a protest song", it "nicely captures elements of the new surveillance". He compared the lines to various new technologies of surveillance, including linking "every breath you take" to breath analysers, "every step you take" to ankle monitors, and "every vow you break" to voice stress analysis.

According to the Phil Spector box-set book Back to Mono (1958–1969) (1991), "Every Breath You Take" is influenced by a Gene Pitney song titled "Every Breath I Take". The Hassles' 1967 song "Every Step I Take (Every Move I Make)," co-written by Billy Joel, also uses this rhyme. Led Zeppelin's song "D'yer Mak'er" (1973) also contains the words "every breath I take; every move I make".

In a 2000 interview, Copeland said Summers should get songwriting credit for "Every Breath You Take". In October 2023, Summers revealed that despite contributing the guitar riff that "has become a kind of immortal guitar part that all guitar players have to learn", he is still pursuing a "contentious" battle with Sting over "Every Breath You Take" songwriting credits. He said that the song was originally "going in the trash until I played on it." He also hinted at a legal battle over the song's songwriting credits. In August 2025, Copeland and Summers sued Sting and his publishing company Magnetic Publishing Limited for writing credits and lost royalties. In January 2026 Sting agreed to pay Copeland and Summers £600,000 after acknowledging underpaying royalties.

== Recording ==
The demo of the song was recorded in an eight-track suite in North London's Utopia studios and featured Sting singing over a Hammond organ. A few months later, he presented the song to the other band members when they reconvened at George Martin's AIR Studios in Montserrat to work on the Synchronicity album. The band initially tried the song in a variety of different styles and arrangements, such as reggae.

While recording, guitarist Andy Summers came up with a guitar part inspired by the Hungarian composer Béla Bartók that would later become a trademark lick, and played it straight through in one take. He was asked to put guitar onto a simple backing track of bass guitar, drums, and a single vocal, with Sting offering no directive beyond "make it your own". Summers remembered:

This was a difficult one to get, because Sting wrote a very good song, but there was no guitar on it. He had this Hammond organ thing that sounded like Billy Preston. It certainly didn't sound like the Police, with that big, rolling synthesizer part. We spent about six weeks recording just the snare drums and the bass. It was a simple, classic chord sequence, but we couldn't agree how to do it. I'd been making an album with Robert Fripp, and I was kind of experimenting with playing Bartók violin duets and had worked up a new riff. When Sting said 'go and make it your own', I went and stuck that lick on it, and immediately we knew we had something special.

The recording process was fraught with difficulties as personal tensions between the band members, particularly Sting and drummer Stewart Copeland, came to the fore. Producer Hugh Padgham claimed that by the time of the recording sessions, Sting and Copeland "hated each other", with verbal and physical fights in the studio common. The tensions almost led to the recording sessions being cancelled until a meeting involving the band and the group's manager, Miles Copeland (Stewart's brother), resulted in an agreement to continue.

The drum track was largely created through separate overdubs of each percussive instrument, with the kick drum coming from the box for the Oberheim DMX drum machine while the main backbeat was created by simultaneously playing a snare and a Tama gong drum. To give the song more liveliness, Padgham asked Copeland to record his drum part in the studio's dining room in order to achieve some "special sound effects". The room, however, was so hot that Copeland's drum sticks had to be taped to his hands to avoid slippage.

Some piano accompaniment of a single repeating note was added to complete the song's bridge. Padgham remembered that the band had "agonized over that part for a long time" and that the song "never really had a proper bridge" in its demo form. He said that Sting entered the recording studio with a few piano ideas where he "bang[ed] away on the same note". Padgham expressed his approval of the piano part, having been reminded of a single note guitar solo from his work producing XTC, and encouraged Sting to use the idea on "Every Breath You Take".

Cash Box described the song as "a subtly crafted minor key ballad" (although the song is actually in A♭ major tuned to A4=432 Hz) and commented on the effect of the "surprising, smokey smooth feel [of the vocal] above the band's patently insistent rhythmic drive."

According to Copeland in 2000:

In my humble opinion, this is Sting's best song with the worst arrangement. I think Sting could have had any other group do this song and it would have been better than our version – except for Andy's brilliant guitar part. Basically, there's an utter lack of groove. It's a totally wasted opportunity for our band. Even though we made gazillions off of it, and it's the biggest hit we ever had, when I listen to this recording, I think "God, what a bunch of assholes we were!"

== Music video ==
The Police in the black-and-white music video for "Every Breath You Take", with a silhouetted man washing a large window behind Stewart Copeland in the background. Cinematographer Daniel Pearl won the first MTV Video Music Award for Best Cinematography in a Video with this music video.

The song had a music video (directed by duo Godley & Creme) loosely based on Gjon Mili's short film Jammin' the Blues (1944). Shot in black and white with a navy blue tint, the video depicts the band, accompanied by a pianist and string section, performing the song in a darkened ballroom as a man washes the floor-to-ceiling window behind them. Sting performs his part on double bass rather than bass guitar.

The video was praised for its cinematography; MTV (1999), Rolling Stone (1993), and VH1 (2001) named it one of the best music videos ever, placing it 16th, 61st, and 33rd in their respective top 100 lists. Daniel Pearl won the first MTV Video Music Award for Best Cinematography in a Video for his work on the video. Released in the early days of MTV, "Every Breath You Take" was one of the earliest videos to enter heavy rotation, which significantly contributed to the song's popularity. American singer-songwriter Richard Marx remembers that "the first video I watched over and over was 'Every Breath You Take'. It was like seeing a Bergman film. Directors usually spelled out every word of the lyrics in a video, but this was the first video I knew that didn't do that. It was abstract." According to A&M Vice President of Marketing and Creative Services Jeff Ayeroff, "[The video for] 'Every Breath You Take' probably cost $75,000 to $100,000, and we sold over 5 million albums. With a good video, the return on your investment was phenomenal."

On 5 October 2022, Billboard released a statement confirming that the music video for "Every Breath You Take" surpassed one billion views on YouTube. As of February 2026, the video has over 1.6 billion views on YouTube.

== Commercial performance ==
"Every Breath You Take" was released as a single on 20 May 1983, with B-side "Murder by Numbers" – a composition by Summers and Sting that had been omitted from the vinyl release of Synchronicity in favour of Copeland's "Miss Gradenko" due to LP length limitations, only appearing as the final track on the CD and cassette. It reached No. 1 in the United Kingdom, the United States, Canada, Israel, Ireland, and South Africa. In Canada, it spent four weeks at No. 1 and an additional six weeks at No. 2. It also reached No. 2 in Spain, Sweden, Norway and Australia, while reaching the Top 10 in most other Western, Northern and Southern European countries.

In the 1983 Rolling Stone critics and readers poll, it was voted Song of the Year. In the US, it was the best-selling single of 1983 and fifth-best-selling single of the decade. Billboard ranked it as the No. 1 song for 1983.

The single became the biggest US and Canadian hit of 1983, topping the Billboard Hot 100 singles chart for eight weeks (the band's only No. 1 hit on that chart). It also topped the Billboard Top Tracks chart for nine weeks.

At the 26th Annual Grammy Awards, "Every Breath You Take" was nominated for three Grammy Awards, including Song of the Year, Best Pop Performance by a Duo or Group with Vocals, and Record of the Year, winning in the first two categories. Sting received the 1983 Ivor Novello Award for Best Song Musically and Lyrically from the British Academy of Songwriters, Composers and Authors (BASCA).

== Legacy ==
Two cover versions charted on the Billboard Hot Country Singles chart in 1983: Rich Landers at number 68 and Mason Dixon at number 69.

In 1999, "Every Breath You Take" was listed as one of the Top 100 Songs of the Century by BMI. In May 2019, BMI updated the list and "Every Breath You Take" was recognised as the Most Performed Song in BMI's catalogue, a distinction previously held by "You've Lost That Lovin' Feelin'" by the Righteous Brothers. In 2003, VH1 ranked the song the No. 2 greatest breakup song. As of 2003, Sting was making an average of $2,000 per day in royalties for the song.

In 2001, The Sopranos episode "Mr. Ruggerio's Neighborhood" features a mashup combining "Every Breath You Take" with Henry Mancini's 1959 song "Peter Gunn".

In October 2007, Sting was awarded a Million-Air certificate for nine million airplays of "Every Breath You Take" at the BMI Awards show in London.

"Every Breath You Take" is the Police's and Sting's signature song, and in 2010 was estimated to generate between a quarter and a third of Sting's music publishing income. In May 2019, it was recognised by BMI as being the most played song in radio history. With nearly 15 million radio plays, Sting received a BMI Award at a ceremony held at the Beverly Wilshire Hotel in Beverly Hills, California to mark it being the Most Performed Song in BMI's catalogue. BMI President and CEO Mike O'Neill stated: "For the first time in 22 years, BMI has a new top song in our repertoire with Sting's timeless hit 'Every Breath You Take', a remarkable achievement that solidifies its place in songwriting history."

In 2004, "Every Breath You Take" was ranked No. 84 on the Rolling Stone list of the 500 Greatest Songs of All Time, although it was moved down to No. 305 in their 2021 update of the list. The song is included in The Rock and Roll Hall of Fame's 500 Songs that Shaped Rock and Roll. It also ranked number 25 on Billboard's Hot 100 All-Time Top Songs. In 2008, Q magazine named "Every Breath You Take" among the top 10 British Songs of the 1980s. In 2015, the song was voted by the British public as the nation's favourite 1980s number one in a UK-wide poll for ITV.

The song is sampled in Puff Daddy and Faith Evans's 1997 hit "I'll Be Missing You", which topped the Billboard Hot 100 for 11 weeks and won a Grammy Award for Best Rap Performance by a Duo or Group; Sting ultimately participated in a performance of "I'll Be Missing You" at the 1997 MTV Video Music Awards.

The song made a comeback as it was featured in the Snow Ball dance scene in Netflix series Stranger Things season 2 in which Eleven and Mike Wheeler dance to "Every Breath You Take". The song became popular with Generation Z and it appeared in videos on TikTok. The scene also won for Best Musical Moment at the 2018 MTV Movie & TV Awards.

The song was played during the last scene of the 2019 The Blacklist season 6 episode "Lady Luck", during which the protagonist Raymond Reddington, with his friend Dembe Zuma, visit a school which he has been donating to and listens to its choir singing it. The song can be understood as a metaphor for the overall control that Reddington exerts over Elizabeth Keen's life.

The last episode of the first series of Spitting Image (1984) ends with a parody version of the song, titled "Every Bomb You Make". Sting recorded new lyrics for the song, which accompanied a video showing the Spitting Image puppets of world leaders and political figures of the day, with the figures matching the altered lyrics.

== Accolades ==
"Every Breath You Take" is listed as one of the Rock and Roll Hall of Fame's 500 Songs that Shaped Rock and Roll. On the 50th anniversary of the Billboard Hot 100 Chart, the song was ranked No. 25 on Billboard's "The All-Time Top 100 Songs" chart.

== Track listing ==
7" single: A&M / AM 117

1. "Every Breath You Take" – 3:56
2. "Murder by Numbers" – 4:31

Two-disc 7" single: A&M / AM 117 Disc one

1. "Every Breath You Take" – 4:13
2. "Murder by Numbers" – 4:31

Disc two

1. "Truth Hits Everybody" (Remix) – 3:34
2. "Man in a Suitcase" (Live) – 2:18

== Personnel ==
Credits from Richard Buskin and co-producer and engineer Hugh Padgham.

- Sting – lead, harmony, and backing vocals; bass guitars; piano; synthesisers; electric double bass
- Andy Summers – guitars, guitar synthesisers
- Stewart Copeland – drums, percussion, Oberheim DMX box

== Charts ==
=== Weekly charts ===
1983 weekly chart performance for "Every Breath You Take"
Chart (1983)	Peak position
Australia (Kent Music Report)	2
Austria (Ö3 Austria Top 40)	8
Belgium (Ultratop 50 Flanders)	9
Canada Top Singles (RPM)	1
Canada (The Record)	1
Canada (CHUM)	1
Denmark (IFPI)	9
Finland (Suomen virallinen lista)	5
Germany (GfK)	8
Ireland (IRMA)	1
Israel (IBA)	1
Italy (Musica e dischi)	3
Netherlands (Dutch Top 40)	6
Netherlands (Single Top 100)	3
New Zealand (Recorded Music NZ)	6
Norway (VG-lista)	2
South Africa (Springbok Radio Top 20)	1
Spain (AFYVE)	2
Sweden (Sverigetopplistan)	2
Switzerland (Schweizer Hitparade)	6
UK Singles (Official Charts)	1
US Billboard Hot 100	1
US Adult Contemporary (Billboard)	5
US Mainstream Rock Airplay (Billboard)	1
US Billboard Dance/Disco Top 80	26
US Cash Box Top 100	1

2007–2015 weekly chart performance for "Every Breath You Take"
Chart (2007–2015)	Peak position
CIS Airplay (TopHit)	126
Russia Airplay (TopHit)	118
Poland Airplay (ZPAV)	60
Slovenia Airplay (SloTop50)	18
Ukraine Airplay (TopHit)	139

2021–2026 weekly chart performance for "Every Breath You Take"
Chart (2021–2026)	Peak position
Argentina Hot 100 (Billboard)	70
Austria Airplay (IFPI)	44
Bolivia Airplay (Monitor Latino)	14
Brazil Hot 100 (Billboard)	72
Canada Digital Song Sales (Billboard)	31
Croatia (Billboard)	25
Czech Republic Singles Digital (ČNS IFPI)	18
Estonia Airplay (TopHit)	157
Finland (Suomen virallinen lista)	44
France (SNEP)	62
Germany Airplay (BVMI)	95
Global 200 (Billboard)	9
Greece International (IFPI) 2003 remaster	5
Israel (Mako Hitlist)	84
Italy (FIMI)	30
Kazakhstan Airplay (TopHit)	83
Latvia Streaming (LaIPA)	15
Lithuania (AGATA)	11
Luxembourg (Billboard)	16
Norway Airplay (IFPI Norge)	57
Panama Streaming (PRODUCE)	105
Philippines Hot 100 (Billboard Philippines)	42
Poland (Polish Streaming Top 100)	28
Portugal (AFP)	27
Romania Airplay (TopHit)	139
Slovakia Singles Digital (ČNS IFPI)	31
Slovenia Airplay (Radiomonitor)	16
Spain (Promusicae)	38
UK Singles (OCC)	77
US Rock Digital Songs (Billboard)	10

=== Monthly charts ===
Monthly chart performance
Chart (2026)	Peak position
Panama Streaming (PRODUCE)	132

=== Year-end charts ===
1983 year-end chart performance for "Every Breath You Take"
Chart (1983)	Rank
Australia (Kent Music Report)	10
Belgium (Ultratop 50 Flanders)	42
Canada Top Singles (RPM)	1
France (SNEP)	50
Germany (Official German Charts)	38
Netherlands (Dutch Top 40)	42
Netherlands (Single Top 100)	45
New Zealand (Recorded Music NZ)	35
South Africa (Springbok)	5
UK Singles (Official Single Charts)	16
US Billboard Hot 100	1
US Adult Contemporary (Billboard)	23
US Cash Box Top 100	2

2022 year-end chart performance for "Every Breath You Take"
Chart (2022)	Rank
Global 200 (Billboard)	170

2023 year-end chart performance for "Every Breath You Take"
Chart (2023)	Rank
Global 200 (Billboard)	155

2024 year-end chart performance for "Every Breath You Take"
Chart (2024)	Rank
Global 200 (Billboard)	94
Portugal (AFP)	131

2025 year-end chart performance for "Every Breath You Take"
Chart (2025)	Rank
Austria (Ö3 Austria Top 40)	48
Belgium (Ultratop 50 Flanders)	134
France (SNEP)	164
Global 200 (Billboard)	42
Italy (FIMI)	93
Netherlands (Single Top 100)	63
Poland (Polish Streaming Top 100)	80
Sweden (Sverigetopplistan)	81
Switzerland (Schweizer Hitparade)	47
UK Singles (OCC)	85

=== Decade-end charts ===
Decade-end chart performance for "Every Breath You Take"
Chart (1980–1989)	Rank
US Billboard Hot 100	5

=== All-time charts ===
All-time chart performance for "Every Breath You Take"
Chart (1958–2021)	Position
US Billboard Hot 100	35

=== PH Electro version ===
==== Weekly charts ====
Weekly chart performance
Chart (2011)	Peak position
CIS Airplay (TopHit)	3
Russia Airplay (TopHit)	3
Ukraine Airplay (TopHit)	32

Weekly chart performance
Chart (2012)	Peak position
CIS Airplay (TopHit)	49
Russia Airplay (TopHit)	45
Ukraine Airplay (TopHit)	192

Weekly chart performance
Chart (2013)	Peak position
CIS Airplay (TopHit)	93
Russia Airplay (TopHit)	87

Weekly chart performance
Chart (2016)	Peak position
Russia Airplay (TopHit)	198

==== Monthly charts ====
Monthly chart performance
Chart (2011)	Peak position
CIS Airplay (TopHit)	6
Russia Airplay (TopHit)	6
Ukraine Airplay (TopHit)	33

Monthly chart performance
Chart (2012)	Peak position
CIS Airplay (TopHit)	54
Russia Airplay (TopHit)	52

Monthly chart performance
Chart (2013)	Peak position
Russia Airplay (TopHit)	98

==== Year-end charts ====
Year-end chart performance
Chart (2011)	Position
CIS Airplay (TopHit)	6
Russia Airplay (TopHit)	6
Ukraine Airplay (TopHit)	110

Year-end chart performance
Chart (2012)	Position
CIS Airplay (TopHit)	101
Russia Airplay (TopHit)	84

== Certifications and sales ==
Certifications and sales for "Every Breath You Take"
Region	Certification	Certified units/sales
Brazil (Pro-Música Brasil)	Gold	30,000^{‡}
Canada	—	150,000
Denmark (IFPI Danmark)	3× Platinum	270,000^{‡}
Germany (BVMI)	3× Gold	900,000^{‡}
Italy (FIMI)	4× Platinum	400,000^{‡}
New Zealand (RMNZ)	7× Platinum	210,000^{‡}
Portugal (AFP)	5× Platinum	50,000^{‡}
Spain (Promusicae)	6× Platinum	360,000^{‡}
United Kingdom (BPI)	4× Platinum	2,400,000^{‡}
United States (RIAA)	Gold	1,000,000^{^}
Streaming
Greece (IFPI Greece)	3× Platinum	6,000,000^{†}
^{^} Shipments figures based on certification alone.^{‡} Sales+streaming figures based on certification alone.^{†} Streaming-only figures based on certification alone.

== See also ==
- List of best-selling singles in Spain
- List of number-one singles of 1983 (Canada)
- List of number-one singles of 1983 (Ireland)
- List of UK singles chart number ones of the 1980s
- List of Billboard Hot 100 number ones of 1983
- List of Billboard Mainstream Rock number-one songs of the 1980s
- Monorhyme
