= I Am P. J. Proby =

Studio album by P. J. Proby
- Released: 1964
- Genre: Rock and roll
- Length: 31:04
- Label: Liberty; EMI
- Producer: Charles Blackwell

P.J. Proby chronology
I Am P. J. Proby (1964)	P.J. Proby (1965)

Professional ratings
Review scores
Source	Rating
AllMusic	47259 2013
Encyclopedia of Popular Music	4/5 stars
Record Mirror	5/5 stars

I Am P. J. Proby is the debut studio album by P. J. Proby, released in 1964 on the Liberty label. It features versions of songs such as Doris Day's hit "Que Sera Sera/Whatever Will Be Will Be" and "Rockin' Pneumonia and the Boogie Woogie Flu". Compared to his other albums, I Am P. J. Proby is faster in beat and more influenced by rock and roll. It was produced by Charles Blackwell who also acted as the musical director. In 2005, the album was released un-mastered in mono on EMI, in a double pack with Proby's second studio album, P. J. Proby.

== Track listing ==
Side one

1. "Whatever Will Be Will Be" (Jay Livingston, Ray Evans)
2. "It's No Good for Me" (Bill Giant, Bernie Baum, Florence Kaye)
3. "Rockin' Pneumonia and the Boogie Woogie Flu" (Huey "Piano" Smith, John Vincent)
4. "The Masquerade Is Over" (Allie Wrubel, Herb Magidson)
5. "Glory of Love" (Billy Hill)
6. "I'll Go Crazy" (James Brown)

Side two

1. "Question" (Lloyd Price, Harold Logan)
2. "You Don't Love Me No More" (Charles Blackwell)
3. "Don't Worry Baby" (Brian Wilson, Roger Christian)
4. "Just Call and I'll Be There" (Charles Blackwell)
5. "Louisiana Man" (Doug Kershaw)
6. "Cuttin' In" (Johnny "Guitar" Watson)
