= 12-Bar Original =

Instrumental by the Beatles

from the album Anthology 2
- Released: 18 March 1996 (UK); 19 March 1996 (US)
- Recorded: 4 November 1965
- Studio: EMI, London
- Genre: Blues rock
- Length: 2:54
- Label: Apple
- Songwriters: John Lennon, Paul McCartney, George Harrison and Richard Starkey
- Producer: George Martin

"12-Bar Original" is an instrumental 12-bar blues by the Beatles. It was recorded in 1965, but was not commercially available until 1996 when an edited version of take 2 of the song was included on the Anthology 2 album. Prior to editing, the length of take 2 was 6:36.

It is one of the few songs credited to Lennon/McCartney/Harrison/Starkey and published by Lenono Music, Inc., MPL Communications Ltd, Harrisongs Ltd., and Startling Music Ltd. Other songs credited to all four Beatles include "Flying" from Magical Mystery Tour; "Dig It" from Let It Be; "Christmas Time (Is Here Again)", the B-side to the 1995 single "Free as a Bird"; and "Now and Then".

Of the Beatles, only John Lennon and Ringo Starr ever commented on the song. During some US radio interviews, Lennon was asked if there were any unissued Beatles recordings. He replied that all he could recall was "some lousy 12 bar". Starr told journalist Peter Palmiere: "We all wrote the track and I have an acetate of one of the versions". The quote was later used by Palmiere in a Ringo Starr cover interview/story in DISCoveries magazine in 1993 and by Jim Berkenstadt and Belmo in their book Black Market Beatles.

"12-Bar Original" was the Beatles' first instrumental after signing for EMI, and was produced by George Martin at EMI's Abbey Road Studios, London. Four other instrumentals by the group are the aforementioned "Flying", an outtake version of that song called "Aerial Tour Instrumental", "Cayenne" and "Cry for a Shadow".

== Composition and recording ==
"12-Bar Original" was recorded on 4 November 1965, the same day as "What Goes On". Beginning with a count-in by McCartney, the track consists of 17 twelve-bar choruses in the key of E major, recorded without overdubs, with drums, bass, guitar and harmonium, clocking in at 6:42. For the track's release on Anthology 2, Martin edited together certain choruses: #1–2 (0:00–0:46), #9–10 (3:04–3:50),#14 (4:59–5:22) and #16–17 (5:46–6:38). The track was the first instrumental the group recorded since "Cry for a Shadow".

== Personnel ==
- John Lennon – lead guitar
- Paul McCartney – bass
- George Harrison – lead guitar
- Ringo Starr – drums
- George Martin – harmonium

Personnel per Ian MacDonald
