= Amory Kane =

- Birth name: Jack Daniel Kane Jr.
- Born: March 28, 1946 (age 78); San Francisco, California, United States
- Genres: Rock, pop, blues
- Occupation(s): Musician, singer-songwriter, artist, writer
- Instrument(s): Vocals, guitar, piano, harmonica, bass, six-string bass
- Years active: 1960s–present
- Labels: MCA, CBS

Jack Daniel Kane Jr. (born March 28, 1946), known professionally as Amory Kane, is an American singer-songwriter, mostly known for his work in Britain in the late 1960s.

== Biography ==
He was born in San Francisco. His father was a military attaché, and as a child he lived in Britain before returning with his family to live in Texas and then back in San Francisco. He became involved in the local music scene in the mid-1960s, as a singer and guitarist, before hitchhiking around Europe and ending up in London. There, he adopted the name Amory Kane (derived from "American") and played in folk clubs. His self-penned single "Reflections (Of Your Face)", released by MCA Records in 1968, was covered by artists such as P.J. Proby.

Kane worked as a session musician in London, playing on recordings credited to bands such as The Magic Lanterns, and met David Bowie, who performed on stage with him at the Wigmore Hall in 1969. He released two solo albums: Memories of Time Unwound, released in 1968 on MCA, which featured then session musicians Jimmy Page and John Paul Jones; and Just to Be There, released in 1970 by CBS, which featured Dave Pegg of Fairport Convention on bass guitar.

Failing to achieve commercial success in Britain, Kane returned to the U.S. in 1972, and started a new career as a restaurant chef. He returned to Britain to release a new album, Fancy Free, in 2021.

== Discography ==
=== Albums ===
- Memories of Time Unwound (May 1969), MCA
- Just to Be There (1970), CBS

=== Singles ===
- "Reflections (Of Your Face)" (1968), MCA
- "You Were On My Mind" (1970), Uni
- "Him Or Me" (1970), CBS
