= Sylvia McNeill =

English musician (1947–c. 2026)

Sylvia McNeill (5 August 1947 – c. 2026) was a British pop and rock singer and songwriter.

== Life and career ==
Sylvia McNeill was born in Harrogate, North Yorkshire, England, on 5 August 1947. She began her career singing and playing bass guitar with various groups and bands. She went abroad for several years, touring American bases on the continent. In 1969, she moved to London; since then she has appeared as a soloist in cabaret through the UK and as a band with husband/guitarist Mike McNeill and son, drummer Mark McNeill.

As well as a bass player for Leapy Lee, she recorded as a solo vocalist from 1968 to 1975, including RCA, Bell, and United Artists labels. McNeill recorded such titles as "That's Alright By Me" (composer Richard Kerr), "Ugly Man" (composer Jim Ford), "Chelsea Morning" (composer Joni Mitchell), "Be My Friend" (originally by Free), "A Whiter Shade Of Pale" (originally by Procol Harum) and "I Don't Know How To Love Him" (composers Andrew Lloyd Webber and Tim Rice). The latter was released on 11 August 1972, as by Sylvie McNeill, in time for the first UK stage musical of Jesus Christ Superstar; she had performed it on The Benny Hill Show (original air date: 23 February 1972). Her producers included Kenny Young, Jack Good, Tony Hall, Tony Macaulay, and Ed Welch. She recorded and toured with the band ZAC.

In one 18-month period, McNeill made over 30 appearances on television, including The Benny Hill Show, The Dave Allen Show, The Morecambe & Wise Show, The Simon Dee Show, The Dick Emery Show, Roger Whittaker's World Of Music, The Golden Shot, Anglia Television's Glamour '70 series (the search for Miss Anglia 1970, Heat 7 - staged in Grimsby, England), Ulster TV and her own eight-week series for Grampian Television.

In addition to her own recordings, she sang on the track "Anne Boleyn/The Day Thou Gavest Lord Hath Ended" for keyboardist Rick Wakeman's 1973 album, The Six Wives of Henry VIII, and was session backing singer for Rod Stewart on his 1972 recording of "What's Made Milwaukee Famous (Has Made a Loser Out of Me)".

In 1971, she acted in Emil Dean Zoghby and Ray Pohlman's musical, Catch My Soul, at the Prince of Wales Theatre in London, England with Lance LeGault, Lon Satton, Sharon Gurney, and Malcolm Rennie in the cast. This rock musical was produced by Jack Good and directed by Braham Murray and Michael Elliott.

McNeill's death was announced in the Autumn/Winter 2026 edition of Equity magazine.
