= Harlan County (album) =

Studio album by Jim Ford
- Released: August 1969
- Genre: Country; soul; funk
- Length: 29:08
- Label: Sundown
- Producer: Jim Ford

Jim Ford chronology
Harlan County (1969)	Point of No Return (2008)

Harlan County is the debut studio album by American singer-songwriter Jim Ford. It was released on Sundown Records in 1969, and reissued on Light in the Attic Records in 2011. The album received universal acclaim from critics.

== Critical reception ==
Professional ratings
Aggregate scores
Source	Rating
Metacritic	88/100
Review scores
Source	Rating
AllMusic	4/5 stars
PopMatters	8/10 stars

At Metacritic, which assigns a weighted average score out of 100 to reviews from mainstream critics, Harlan County received an average score of 88, based on 7 reviews, indicating "universal acclaim".

Stephen Thomas Erlewine of AllMusic commented that "Harlan County is filled with unassuming, midtempo rockers and ballads, which are either songs about love or driving." He added, "Ford has a pleasant, unremarkable white soul voice that, when combined with the mannered production, tends to undersell the songs, which would have benefited from grittier, committed performances." Andrew Hultkrans of Spin wrote, "A Kentucky-born singer-songwriter once called the 'baddest white man on the planet' by Sly Stone, Jim Ford pioneered a seamless blend of country, soul, and funk on 1969's Harlan County, using a crack studio band that included Elvis guitarist James Burton and Dr. John."

== Track listing ==
All tracks are written by Jim Ford, except where indicated.

No.	Title	Writer(s)	Length
1.	"Harlan County"		3:32
2.	"I Wanna Make Her Love Me"	Henry Cosby; Lula Hardaway; Sylvia Moy; Stevie Wonder	3:10
3.	"Changin' Colors"	Suzanna Jordan	3:19
4.	"Dr. Handy"		2:36
5.	"Love on My Brain"		3:18
6.	"Long Road Ahead"	Bonnie Bramlett; Delaney Bramlett; Carl Radle	2:58
7.	"Under Construction"		1:45
8.	"Workin' My Way to L.A."	Ford; Lolly Vegas	2:47
9.	"Spoonful"	Willie Dixon	2:48
10.	"To Make My Life Beautiful"	Alex Harvey	2:57
Total length:			29:08

== Personnel ==
Credits adapted from liner notes.

- Jim Ford – arrangement (2, 6–8), production
- Lolly Vegas – arrangement (2, 6–8)
- Gene Page – arrangement (1, 3–5, 9, 10)
- Rik Pekkonen – engineering
