= If You've Got Trouble =

Song by The Beatles

from the album Anthology 2
- Released: 18 March 1996
- Recorded: 18 February 1965
- Genre: Rock
- Length: 2:49
- Label: Apple Records
- Songwriter: Lennon–McCartney
- Producer: George Martin

"If You've Got Trouble" is a song written by Lennon–McCartney and recorded by The Beatles on 18 February 1965 with Ringo Starr singing the lead vocals. The song was intended to be Starr's vocal appearance on the Help! album and the Help! film, but The Beatles were not happy with the recording, and later chose to record "Act Naturally" (not shown in the film) instead. "If You've Got Trouble" remained unreleased until Anthology 2 in 1996.

== Recording ==
"If You've Got Trouble" was recorded in a session beginning at 6:00pm on 18 February 1965, the fourth day of recording for Help!. It was one of three songs worked on that day, the others being "You've Got to Hide Your Love Away" (recorded earlier in the day) and "Tell Me What You See" (recorded in the same evening session).

The backing track for the song was recorded in a single take. Starr then overdubbed a double-tracked vocal, and Harrison added an extra guitar part.

A mono mix of "If You've Got Trouble" was prepared on 20 February 1965. A stereo mix of the song was created for Anthology 2, and this mono mix remains unreleased.

== Aborted release ==
"If You've Got Trouble" was prepared for release in 1984 for the Sessions album. Geoff Emerick edited the arrangement, swapping the verses around and knocking around 20 seconds off the running time. After the release of Sessions was blocked by the surviving Beatles, this version was subsequently widely bootlegged until the unedited version was released on Anthology 2.

== Critical reception ==
Music critic Ian MacDonald said the song was "the only unmitigated disaster in the Lennon–McCartney catalogue", and criticised its lyrics and melody. Beatles' historian Mark Lewisohn agreed, saying it was "not one of the better Lennon–McCartney numbers ... nor was it brilliantly performed." Starr's own spoken interjection before the guitar break, "Oh, rock on, anybody," is thought to be his own spontaneously-expressed unenthusiastic opinion of what he was singing. George Harrison stated that "it's the most weird song...it's got stupid words and is the naffest song. No wonder it didn't make it onto anything." AllMusic critic Richie Unterberger gave a more favourable assessment, remarking that "For all its lack of seriousness, 'If You Got Trouble' [sic] is hummable, likable, and performed with good-natured spirit."

== Cover versions ==
The song was covered by singer Fabienne Delsol with her group The Bristols, appearing on their 1999 album Introducing... The Bristols.

Although not technically a cover, the Posies' instrumental "Alison Hubbard" (included on the expanded reissue of Failure) is built around a copy of the main "If You've Got Trouble" riff.

== Personnel ==
- Ringo Starr – double-tracked vocal, drums
- John Lennon – rhythm guitar
- Paul McCartney – bass, rhythm guitar
- George Harrison – lead guitar
- George Martin – producer
- Norman Smith – engineer

== See also ==
- "That Means a Lot" – another Lennon–McCartney song recorded during the Help! sessions that was unreleased
