= Anthology 2 =

Compilation album by the Beatles
- Released: 18 March 1996
- Recorded: 16 February 1965 – 30 April 1969; c. 1980 & February 1995
- Genres: Rock, pop
- Length: 127:54
- Labels: Apple (CDP 7243 8 34448 2), Capitol
- Producers: George Martin, Jeff Lynne, John Lennon, Paul McCartney, George Harrison, Ringo Starr ("Real Love")

The Beatles chronology
Anthology 1 (1995)	Anthology 2 (1996)	Anthology 3 (1996)

Singles from Anthology 2
- 1. "Real Love" Released: 4 March 1996

Anthology 2 is a compilation album by the Beatles, released on 18 March 1996 by Apple Records as part of The Beatles Anthology series. It features rarities, outtakes and live performances from the 1965 sessions for Help! until the sessions immediately prior to their trip to India in February 1968. It is the second in a quartet of albums with Anthology 1, Anthology 3, and Anthology 4 and all of which tie in with the televised special The Beatles Anthology. The opening track is "Real Love", the second of the two recordings that reunited the Beatles for the first time since the band's break-up. Like its predecessor, the album topped the Billboard 200 album chart and has been certified 4× Platinum by the RIAA.

The Anthology albums were remastered and made available digitally on the iTunes Store on 14 June 2011, individually and as part of the Anthology Collection box set.

== Content ==
"Real Love", as with "Free as a Bird", is based on a demo made by John Lennon and given to Paul McCartney by Lennon's widow, Yoko Ono. The three surviving Beatles (McCartney, George Harrison and Ringo Starr) added guitars, bass, drums, percussion and backing vocals, but unlike with the previous song, did not re-work the lyrics or music. "Real Love" remained solely credited to Lennon, becoming the only Beatles song to have Lennon by himself in the writing credit.

Disc one contains three unreleased compositions, one being an instrumental entitled "12-Bar Original", recorded for Rubber Soul but subsequently unused. Two other songs recorded for Help!, "If You've Got Trouble" and "That Means a Lot", were abandoned and never returned to again by the band. The former was originally slated to be the usual vocal spot for Ringo Starr on Help!, and the latter was eventually given to singer P.J. Proby. The version of "Everybody's Trying to Be My Baby" from the group's famed August 1965 show at Shea Stadium but left out of the documentary about the show appears for the first time.

"I'm Down" was originally listed as Track 7 (in its correct place chronologically) but was shifted out of sequence to Track 3 at the last minute, at Paul McCartney's request. The album had already gone to press and McCartney reportedly paid the re-printing costs himself.

Disc two contains work-in-progress versions of tracks from Sgt. Pepper's Lonely Hearts Club Band and Magical Mystery Tour. The take of "Strawberry Fields Forever" that made up the first minute of the released record appears in its entirety on track three. Also included are three songs that were started during this period – "Only a Northern Song", "You Know My Name (Look Up the Number)" and "Across the Universe" – but would not see release until years later, in 1969 and 1970.

McCartney had hoped to include "Carnival of Light", an unreleased experimental piece that the Beatles recorded during the sessions for Sgt. Pepper in 1967; however, the idea was vetoed by Harrison, Starr and Ono on the grounds that the track was never intended for a Beatles release. Among the songs that were in the running for inclusion on the compilation but ultimately passed over were the following: the 1965 Shea Stadium performance of "She's a Woman"; a live version of "Nowhere Man", recorded in Tokyo in 1966; "Paperback Writer", featuring only vocals; and out-takes of "Think for Yourself" and "Love You To".

== Reception ==
Professional ratings
Review scores
Source	Rating
AllMusic	3.5/5 stars
Robert Christgau	(dud)
The Encyclopedia of Popular Music	4/5 stars
Entertainment Weekly	B
Guitarist	5/5 stars
MusicHound	3/5
NME	10/10
Q	4/5 stars
The Rolling Stone Album Guide	3/5 stars
Vox	10/10
Wall of Sound	92/100

Like its predecessor, Anthology 2 sold well. In the United States, it debuted at number one, selling 442,000 copies its first week. The next week, it fell to number two, selling 201,000 copies, being replaced by Alanis Morissette's Jagged Little Pill. The album spent two more weeks on the top 10, at number four then number eight, remaining on the Billboard 200 for 22 consecutive weeks and then re-entering the charts twice, marking a number 96 reach during the Christmas season of 1996. In all, the album spent 37 weeks on the charts (eight more than Anthology 1) and sold 1,707,000 copies. In the United Kingdom, the success was similar. The first Anthology album had debuted at number two when it was released in November 1995, but its successor reached number one, where it remained for one week. The album spent a total of 13 weeks on the UK Albums Chart.

Reviewing the compilation in March 1996, Billboard's reviewer described it as a "precious window into the most lucrative creative collaboration in the history of popular music".

== Release history ==
Country	Date	Label	Format	Catalogue
United Kingdom	1996-03-18	Apple, EMI	Triple vinyl LP	PCSP728 / 72438 34448 1 6
United Kingdom	1996-03-18	Apple, EMI	Double CD	CDPCSP728 / 7243 8 34448 2 3
United Kingdom	1996-03-18	Apple, EMI	Cassette	TCPCSP728
United States	1996-03-19	Apple, Capitol, EMI	Triple vinyl LP	CDP 7243 8 34448 1 6
United States	1996-03-19	Apple, Capitol, EMI	Double CD	CDP 7243 8 34448 2 3

== Track listing ==
All tracks in stereo, except where noted.

All tracks are written by Lennon–McCartney, except where noted.

Disc one
No.	Title	Writer(s)	Recording date and location	Length
1.	"Real Love"	John Lennon	c. July 1980 in The Dakota, New York City, New York US; February 1995 in Hogg Hill Mill, Icklesham, UK	3:54
2.	"Yes It Is" (Takes 2 & 14)		16 February 1965 in EMI Studios, London, UK	1:50
3.	"I'm Down" (Take 1)		14 June 1965 in EMI Studios	2:53
4.	"You've Got to Hide Your Love Away" (Takes 1, 2 & 5; mono)		18 February 1965 in EMI Studios	2:45
5.	"If You've Got Trouble"		18 February 1965 in EMI Studios	2:48
6.	"That Means A Lot" (Take 1)		20 February 1965 in EMI Studios	2:27
7.	"Yesterday" (Take 1)		14 June 1965 in EMI Studios	2:34
8.	"It's Only Love" (Takes 3 & 2; mono)		15 June 1965 in EMI Studios	1:59
9.	"I Feel Fine" (live on Blackpool Night Out; mono)		1 August 1965 in ABC Theatre, Blackpool, UK	2:16
10.	"Ticket to Ride" (live on Blackpool Night Out; mono)		1 August 1965 in ABC Theatre	2:45
11.	"Yesterday" (live on Blackpool Night Out; mono)		1 August 1965 in ABC Theatre	2:43
12.	"Help!" (live on Blackpool Night Out; mono)		1 August 1965 in ABC Theatre	2:55
13.	"Everybody's Trying to Be My Baby" (live at Shea Stadium; mono)	Carl Perkins	15 August 1965 in Shea Stadium, New York City	2:45
14.	"Norwegian Wood (This Bird Has Flown)" (Take 1)		12 October 1965 in EMI Studios	1:59
15.	"I'm Looking Through You" (Take 1)		24 October 1965 in EMI Studios	2:54
16.	"12-Bar Original" (Take 2 edited)	Lennon; Paul McCartney; George Harrison; Richard Starkey	4 November 1965 in EMI Studios	2:55
17.	"Tomorrow Never Knows" ("Mark 1" / Take 1)		6 April 1966 in EMI Studios	3:14
18.	"Got to Get You into My Life" (Take 5; mono)		7 April 1966 in EMI Studios	2:54
19.	"And Your Bird Can Sing" (Take 2)		20 April 1966 in EMI Studios	2:13
20.	"Taxman" (Take 11)	Harrison	21 April 1966 in EMI Studios	2:32
21.	"Eleanor Rigby (strings only)" (Take 14)		28 April 1966 in EMI Studios	2:06
22.	"I'm Only Sleeping (rehearsal)" (mono)		29 April 1966 in EMI Studios	0:41
23.	"I'm Only Sleeping (Take 1)" (mono)		29 April 1966 in EMI Studios	2:59
24.	"Rock and Roll Music" (live in Tokyo; mono)	Chuck Berry	30 June 1966 in Nippon Budokan Hall, Tokyo, Japan	1:39
25.	"She's a Woman" (live in Tokyo; mono)		30 June 1966 in Nippon Budokan Hall	2:55
Total length:				63:35

Disc two
No.	Title	Writer(s)	Recording date and location	Length
1.	"Strawberry Fields Forever (demo sequence)" (mono)		24 November 1966 in Kenwood, Weybridge, UK	1:42
2.	"Strawberry Fields Forever" (Take 1)		24 November 1966 in EMI Studios	2:35
3.	"Strawberry Fields Forever" (Take 7 and edit piece; mono)		29 November & 9 December 1966 in EMI Studios	4:14
4.	"Penny Lane" (remix)		29 December 1966 – 17 January 1967 in EMI Studios	3:13
5.	"A Day in the Life" (Takes 1, 2, 6 & orchestra)		19–20 January & 10 February 1967 in EMI Studios	5:05
6.	"Good Morning Good Morning" (Take 8)		8 & 16 February 1967 in EMI Studios	2:40
7.	"Only a Northern Song" (Takes 3 & 12)	Harrison	13–14 February & 20 April 1967 in EMI Studios	2:44
8.	"Being for the Benefit of Mr. Kite! (Takes 1 and 2)"		17 February 1967 in EMI Studios	1:05
9.	"Being for the Benefit of Mr. Kite! (Take 7)"		17 & 20 February 1967 in EMI Studios	2:34
10.	"Lucy in the Sky with Diamonds" (Takes 6, 7 & 8)		1–2 March 1967 in EMI Studios	3:06
11.	"Within You Without You (instrumental)"	Harrison	15 March – 3 April 1967 in EMI Studios	5:27
12.	"Sgt. Pepper's Lonely Hearts Club Band (Reprise)" (Take 5; mono)		1 April 1967 in EMI Studios	1:27
13.	"You Know My Name (Look Up the Number)" (extended stereo remix)		17 May & 7–8 June 1967; 30 April 1969 in EMI Studios	5:43
14.	"I Am the Walrus" (Take 16)		5 September 1967 in EMI Studios	4:02
15.	"The Fool on the Hill (demo)" (mono)		6 September 1967 in EMI Studios	2:48
16.	"Your Mother Should Know" (Take 27)		16 September 1967 in EMI Studios	3:02
17.	"The Fool on the Hill (Take 4)"		25 September 1967 in EMI Studios	3:45
18.	"Hello, Goodbye" (Take 16)		2 & 19 October 1967 in EMI Studios	3:18
19.	"Lady Madonna" (Takes 3 & 4)		3 & 6 February 1968 in EMI Studios	2:22
20.	"Across the Universe" (Take 2)		4 February 1968 in EMI Studios	3:29
Total length:				64:21

== Charts ==
=== Weekly charts ===
Weekly chart performance for Anthology 2
Chart (1996)	Peak position
Australian Albums (ARIA)	2
Austrian Albums (Ö3 Austria)	9
Belgian Albums (Ultratop Flanders)	8
Belgian Albums (Ultratop Wallonia)	7
Canadian Albums (RPM)	3
Dutch Albums (Album Top 100)	4
European Albums (Top 100)	4
Finnish Albums (Suomen virallinen lista)	5
French Albums (SNEP)	22
German Albums (Offizielle Top 100)	4
Hungarian Albums (MAHASZ)	7
Italian Albums (FIMI)	13
Japanese Albums (Oricon)	3
New Zealand Albums (RMNZ)	3
Norwegian Albums (VG-lista)	5
Scottish Albums (Official Charts)	2
Swedish Albums (Sverigetopplistan)	2
Swiss Albums (Schweizer Hitparade)	4
UK Albums (Official Charts)	1
US Billboard 200	1

=== Year-end charts ===
Year-end chart performance for Anthology 2
Chart (1996)	Position
Australian Albums (ARIA)	70
Canadian Albums (RPM)	34
Dutch Albums (Album Top 100)	71
European Albums (Top 100)	44
Japanese Albums (Oricon)	95
UK Albums (OCC)	60
US Billboard 200	39

== Certifications and sales ==
Certifications and sales for Anthology 2
Region	Certification	Certified units/sales
Argentina (CAPIF)	Gold	30,000^{^}
Australia (ARIA)	Gold	35,000^{^}
Belgium (BRMA)	Gold	25,000^{*}
Canada (Music Canada)	4× Platinum	400,000^{^}
France (SNEP)	Gold	100,000^{*}
Japan (RIAJ)	Platinum	266,000
United Kingdom (BPI)	Platinum	300,000^{^}
United States (RIAA)	4× Platinum	2,000,000^{^}
^{*} Sales figures based on certification alone.^{^} Shipments figures based on certification alone.

== Personnel ==
The Beatles

- John Lennon – vocals, rhythm guitar, piano on "Real Love", organ on "I'm Down", lead guitar on "I Feel Fine" and "12-Bar Original", electric piano on "I am the Walrus", sound effects
- Paul McCartney – vocals, bass guitar, piano, mellotron, lead guitar on "Taxman", acoustic guitar on "Yesterday"; double bass, harpsichord on "Real Love", harmonium on "Real Love" and "Your Mother Should Know", Lowrey organ on "Lucy in the Sky with Diamonds", recorder on "The Fool on the Hill"
- George Harrison – lead guitar, tambura, swarmandal, sitar, slide guitar on "Real Love", organ on "Only a Northern Song", vibraphone on "You Know My Name (Look Up the Number), vocals on "Everybody's Trying To Be My Baby", "Taxman", and "Only a Northern Song"
- Ringo Starr – drums, bongos on "You Know My Name (Look Up the Number)", vocals on "If You've Got Trouble"

Additional musicians (where credited)

- George Martin – string, brass, and orchestral arrangements, harmonium on "12-Bar Original", organ on "Got to Get You into My Life" and "Being for the Benefit of Mr. Kite"
- Mal Evans – alarm clock and counting on "A Day in the Life"
- Brian Jones – alto saxophone on "You Know My Name (Look Up the Number)"

== See also ==
- Outline of the Beatles
- The Beatles timeline
