= Every Breath I Take =

Single by Gene Pitney
- Released: 1961
- Recorded: 1961
- Studio: Bell Sound Studios, New York
- Songwriters: Gerry Goffin, Carole King
- Producer: Phil Spector

Gene Pitney singles chronology
"Louisiana Mama" (1961)	"Every Breath I Take" (1961)	"Town Without Pity" (1961)

"Every Breath I Take" is a song by American singer Gene Pitney that was written by Gerry Goffin and Carole King. It was produced by Phil Spector and released as a single in 1961, reaching number 42 on U.S. record charts.

== Background and recording ==
"Every Breath I Take" was produced by Phil Spector at Bell Sound Studios in New York in June or July 1961, with the arrangement credited to Alan Lauber. The arrangement, according to Spector biographer Mick Brown, was a "melodramatic" combination of doo-wop backing vocals, orchestral strings, and a march-like rhythmic foundation beneath Pitney’s nasal falsetto delivery.

The recording drew an unusually large crowd all packed into the small control booth, leading Pitney to later call it "the most ridiculous session ever." Pitney, battling a severe cold, sang the entire track in falsetto; additionally, he later said, "Phil wanted to experiment, [but] he didn’t have enough control – not to the extent he had later – and there were too many people at the session, making comments." Attendees included Goffin, King, music publisher Don Kirshner, Leiber and Stoller, Barry Mann, Cynthia Weil, and Burt Bacharach.

Spector's insistence on completing the entire recording in a single session, despite union musicians' fees escalating from standard scale to time-and-a-half after three hours and double scale thereafter, forced the session into overtime. Ultimately, two usable takes were made. Pitney later recalled that the recording expenses totaled $14,000 (equivalent to $147,000 in 2024), an extraordinary sum when most pop recordings cost about $500 per song ($5,000).

== Reception ==
"Every Breath I Take" peaked at number 42 on the Billboard Hot 100. Spector biographer Dave Thompson opined that the single's commercial success was hindered by the arrangement and the faded mainstream appeal of doo-wop despite "a strident orchestral backdrop punctuated by illuminating squalling strings, and a drum beat (from Gary Chester) that echoed like a mellow jackhammer." Writing in 2021, Alexis Petridis of The Guardian described the record as "one of the few early Spector productions to hint at the more-is-more Wall of Sound approach that would make him a legend."
