= Jim Ford (singer-songwriter) =

American singer-songwriter (1941–2007)

James Henry Ford (August 23, 1941 – November 18, 2007) was an American singer-songwriter originally from Johnson County, Kentucky. After living in New Orleans, Ford moved to Los Angeles, and finally settled in Fort Bragg, California. His music is a mixture of soul, country and folk. His songs and songs he co-wrote have been recorded by numerous artists, including Aretha Franklin, P.J. Proby, Bobby Womack, and the Temptations. The UK singer Sylvia McNeill recorded "Ugly Man" in 1970, the only known version, as Ford's could not be found in his archives. Nick Lowe has cited Jim Ford as his biggest musical influence, and Sly Stone once called him "the baddest white man on the planet."

His most famous song is probably "Harry Hippie", a song recorded and released by Womack in 1973.

After beating a cocaine addiction in 2004, Ford started recording again. He was a recluse at that time, but L-P Anderson of Sweden's Sonic Magazine managed to track him down in his California trailer home in April 2006.

Bear Family Records re-released his album Harlan County, originally recorded in 1969, with 15 previously unreleased songs and a 40-page booklet as The Sounds of Our Time in early 2007. The success of The Sounds of Our Time made the idea of recording new material possible. At times there was talk of using Jim Dickinson as producer, and James Burton volunteered to play guitar. A charity gig for Ford was to take place in London, England, on May 18, 2008. Nick Lowe was scheduled to perform together with Ford.

Ford was found dead early in the evening on November 18, 2007, in his trailer home, by the Mendocino County Sheriff's department. He was 66. A few months after his death, Bear Family released a compilation of previously unavailable Ford recordings, Point of No Return.

== Discography ==
=== Albums ===
- Harlan County, Sundown/White Whale Records JHS-1002, 1969
- Big Mouth USA: The Unissued Paramount Album, Bear Family Records, 2009
- The Unissued Capitol Album, Bear Family Records, 2009

=== Compilations ===
- The Sounds of Our Time: The Harlan County Album, Rare Singles and Previously Unreleased Masters, Bear Family Records, 2007
- Point of No Return: Previously Unreleased Masters, a Lost 45 & Rare Demos, Bear Family Records, 2008
- Demolition Expert: Rare Acoustic Demos, Bear Family Records, 2011

== Songs ==
- "36 Inches High" (Jim Ford), recorded by Nick Lowe, Jesus of Cool
- "American Dream" (Jim Ford, Bobby Womack), recorded by Bobby Womack, The Poet II
- "Butterfly High" (Jim Ford), recorded by P.J. Proby
- "Dr. Handy's Dandy Candy" (Jim Ford), recorded by Jim Ford, Harlan County
- "Fountains of Love" (Jim Ford, Ronnie Wood), recorded by Ronnie Wood, 1234
- "Harlan County" (Jim Ford), recorded by Jim Ford, Harlan County
- "Harry Hippie" (Jim Ford), recorded by Bobby Womack
- "I'm Ahead If I Can Quit While I'm Behind", recorded by Bobby Womack, B.W. Goes C.&W.
- "I'm Ahead If I Can Quit While I'm Behind", recorded by Brinsley Schwarz, Greasy Truckers Party
- "Ju Ju Man" (Jim Ford, Lolly Vegas), recorded by Brinsley Schwarz, Silver Pistol
- "Ju Ju Man" (Jim Ford, Lolly Vegas), recorded by Dave Edmunds, Get It
- "Love on My Brain" (Jim Ford), recorded by Jim Ford, Harlan County
- "Niki Hoeky" (Jim Ford, Lolly Vegas, Pat Vegas), recorded by P.J. Proby, 1966
- "Niki Hoeky" (Jim Ford, Lolly Vegas, Pat Vegas), recorded by Bobbie Gentry, Ode to Billie Joe, 1967
- "Niki Hoeky" (Jim Ford, Lolly Vegas, Pat Vegas), recorded by Aretha Franklin, Lady Soul, 1968
- "Niki Hoeky" (Jim Ford, Lolly Vegas, Pat Vegas), recorded by the Ventures, Swamp Rock, 1969
- "Niki Hoeke Speedway" (Jim Ford, Lolly Vegas, Pat Vegas), recorded by Brinsley Schwarz, Silver Pistol, 1972
- "Outlaws" (Jim Ford, Ronnie Wood), recorded by Bo Diddley and Ronnie Wood, Live at the Ritz
- "Outlaws" (Jim Ford, Ronnie Wood), recorded by Ronnie Wood, 1234
- "Secrets" (Jim Ford, Bobby Womack), recorded by Bobby Womack, The Poet
- "She Never Told Me" (Jim Ford, Ronnie Wood), recorded by Ronnie Wood, 1234
- "So Many Sides of You" (Jim Ford, Bobby Womack), recorded by Bobby Womack, The Poet
- "Surprise, Surprise" (Jim Ford, Bobby Womack), recorded by Bobby Womack, The Poet II
- "Sweet Baby Mine" (Jim Ford, Bobby Womack), recorded by Ronnie Wood, Now Look
- "Tell Me Why" (Jim Ford, Bobby Womack), recorded by Bobby Womack, The Poet II
- "Through the Eyes of a Child" (Jim Ford, Bobby Womack), recorded by Bobby Womack, The Poet II
- "Tryin' to Get Over You" (Jim Ford, Bobby Womack), recorded by Bobby Womack, The Poet II
- "Ugly Man" (Jim Ford), recorded by Sylvia McNeill, UK RCA 45
- "Under Construction" (Jim Ford), recorded by Jim Ford, Harlan County
- "Where Do We Go from Here" (Jim Ford, Bobby Womack), recorded by Bobby Womack, The Poet
- "Who's Foolin' Who" (Jim Ford, Bobby Womack), recorded by Bobby Womack, The Poet II
- "Working My Way to L.A." (Jim Ford, Lolly Vegas), recorded by Jim Ford, Harlan County
