= That Means a Lot =

Song composed by Lennon–McCartney

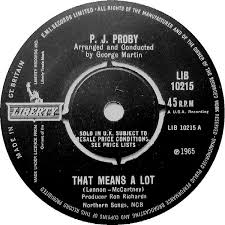
P.J. Proby single label

"That Means a Lot" is a song written mainly by Paul McCartney, and credited to Lennon–McCartney. It was released in 1965 by P.J. Proby. Proby's version reached #24 on the NME chart. Prior to the release by Proby, the Beatles recorded a version that was intended for the Help! film and soundtrack album. The Beatles were dissatisfied with the song and their version was not released until the Anthology 2 CD in 1996.

Lennon said at the time, "This song is a ballad which Paul and I wrote for the film but we found we just couldn't sing it. In fact, we made a hash of it, so we thought we'd better give it to someone who could do it well." In an interview with Mark Lewisohn in 1988, McCartney said, "There were a few songs that we were just not as keen on, or we didn't think they were quite finished. This was one of them."

== P.J. Proby version ==
Brian Epstein, the Beatles' business manager, gave the song to Proby, another of the acts he managed. Proby was introduced to Epstein by Jack Good who had created numerous television shows including Around The Beatles. Proby released "That Means a Lot" in September 1965. His version was produced by Ron Richards, arranged and conducted by George Martin.

== Beatles' version ==
"That Means a Lot"

Song by The Beatles

from the album Anthology 2
- Released: 18 March 1996
- Recorded: 20 February 1965
- Genre: Rock
- Length: 2:26
- Label: Apple
- Songwriter(s): Lennon–McCartney
- Producer(s): Ron Richards

Multiple takes of the song were recorded by the Beatles on 20 February and 30 March 1965. The three takes recorded on 30 March were markedly different from the original but not more successful.

The song is credited to Lennon–McCartney, but in his 1980 interview with Playboy, Lennon claimed the song was written by McCartney.

=== Personnel ===
- Paul McCartney – vocal, bass, piano
- John Lennon – backing vocal, acoustic guitar, maracas
- George Harrison – backing vocal, rhythm guitar, maracas
- Ringo Starr – drums

Personnel per MacDonald

== See also ==
- "If You've Got Trouble" – another Lennon–McCartney song recorded during the Help! sessions that was unreleased
