= P. J. Proby =

American singer, songwriter, and actor (born 1938)

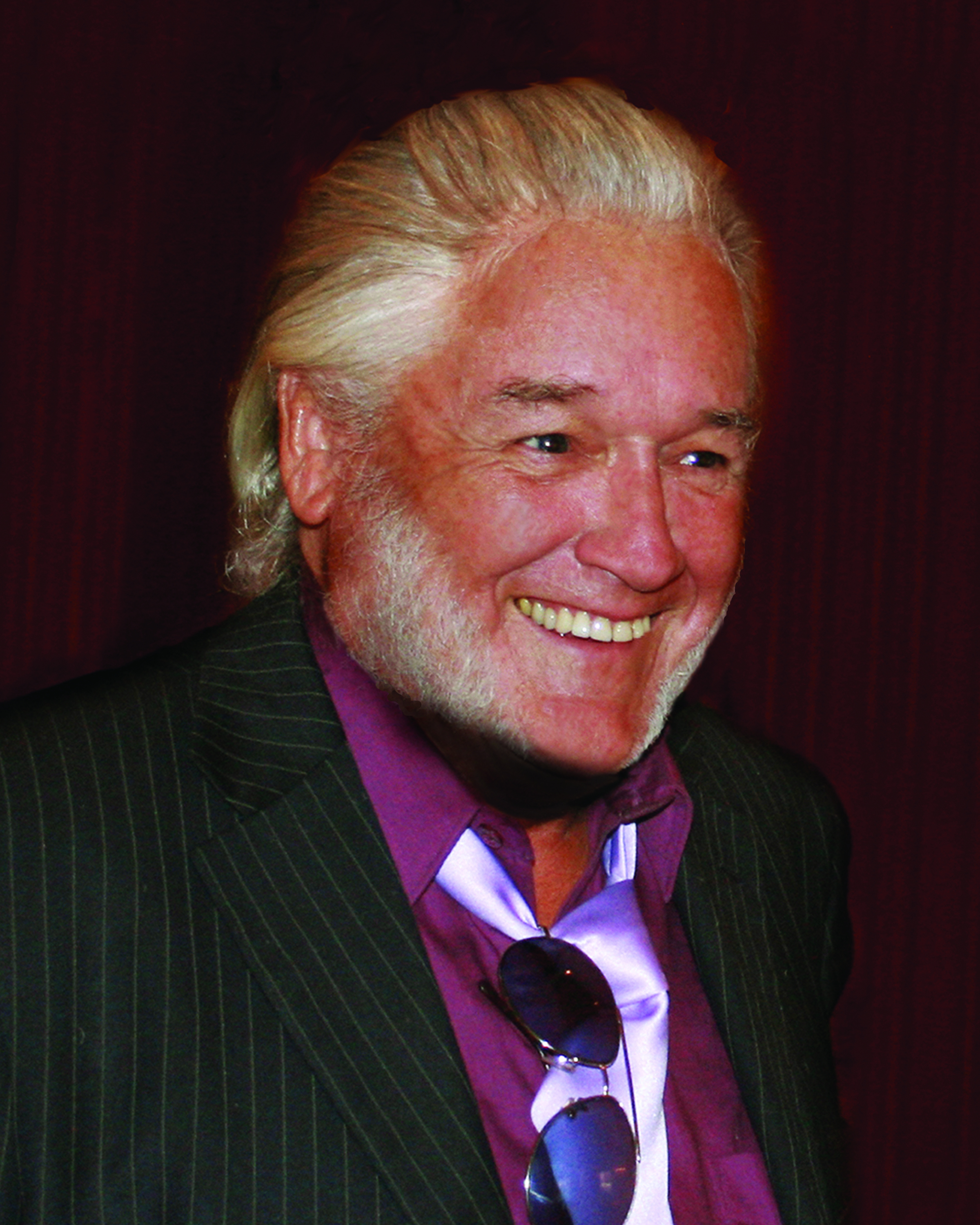
- P. J. Proby in 2007

Background information
- Born: James Marcus Smith; November 6, 1938 (age 88); Houston, Texas, US
- Genres: Pop, R&B, Soul, Rock and roll
- Occupations: Singer, songwriter, actor
- Instrument: Vocals
- Years active: 1957–present
- Labels: Decca, London, Liberty, EMI, Select
- Website: pjproby.net

P. J. Proby (born James Marcus Smith; November 6, 1938) is an American singer, songwriter, and actor.

Proby recorded the singles "Hold Me", "Somewhere", and "Maria". In 2008, EMI released the greatest hits album Best of the EMI Years 1961–1972. He still writes and records on his own independent record label, Select Records, and performs in the UK in Sixties-themed concerts.

== Early life ==
Proby was born James Marcus Smith on November 6, 1938, in Houston, Texas. He is a great-grandson of Old West outlaw John Wesley Hardin. His father was an affluent banker; at nine, his parents divorced and as part of the custody deal, Proby was sent to military school. He began at San Marcos Military Academy, and followed with stints in Culver Naval Academy and Western Military Academy.

== Career ==
=== 1960s ===
By the time Proby left school, he had already wanted a career "in the movies" and moved to California to become an actor and recording artist. Given the stage name Jett Powers by Hollywood agents Gabey, Lutz, Heller, and Loeb, he took acting and singing lessons and played small roles in films. Two singles, "Go, Girl, Go" and "Loud Perfume" appeared on two small independent record labels. In 1960, songwriter Sharon Sheeley persuaded him to adopt the stage name P. J. Proby, the name of her former boyfriend from high school, and secured Proby an audition for Dick Glasser of Liberty Records. It was a success, and Proby signed with the label and the music publisher Metric Music. After a number of unsuccessful singles, in 1962 Proby began writing songs and recording demos for artists such as Elvis Presley, Bobby Vee, and Johnny Burnette, who had his final UK chart success with the song "Clown Shoes", credited to Proby's real name.

Proby travelled to London after being introduced to Jack Good by Sheeley and Jackie DeShannon. He appeared on The Beatles' Around the Beatles television special in 1964. Under Good, Proby had UK top 10 hits in 1964 and 1965 including "Hold Me" (UK Number 3), "Together" (UK Number 8), "Somewhere" (UK Number 6), and "Maria" (UK Number 8); the last two songs were both lifted from the musical West Side Story. He also recorded the Lennon–McCartney composition "That Means a Lot", a song the Beatles recorded in 1965, but never officially released until 1996.

Proby is remembered for an incident in England in January 1965, when his trousers split across the knees during a show in Croydon, Surrey. As a result, Proby was banned in every major theatre in Britain, plus appearing on the BBC and ITV television channels. The incident scandalised the British press and public, causing Proby's career to lose momentum. Minor hits in 1966 were followed by flops, and in March 1968, "It's Your Day Today", gave Proby his last UK chart entry for nearly 30 years.

In 1967 Proby scored his only Billboard Hot 100 top forty hit with "Niki Hoeky". In September 1968, he recorded Three Week Hero, released in 1969. A collection of country-style ballads mixed with blues, it used the New Yardbirds, later to become Led Zeppelin, as the backing band. The album was produced by Steve Rowland.

=== 1970s–1980s ===
In 1971, he appeared as Cassio in a rock musical of Shakespeare's Othello, Catch My Soul. He performed in cabaret and nightclubs, singing 1960s ballads and rhythm and blues.

In 1977, he appeared as a contestant on the UK television talent show Opportunity Knocks. He wore an eye-mask and was billed as "The Masked Singer". Signing with Good again that year, he portrayed Elvis in Elvis – The Musical but was fired for ignoring the script and talking to the audience. Later in 1977, Proby agreed to record lead vocals on some tracks by Dutch progressive rock band Focus that were released on Focus con Proby, their final album before the group disbanded in the following year.

In the 1980s, writers David Britton and Michael Butterworth attempted to revive Proby's career. The pair got the singer to record covers of various songs for their label Savoy Records, including "Tainted Love" by Gloria Jones, "Love Will Tear Us Apart" by Joy Division, "Anarchy in the UK" by The Sex Pistols, "Sign o' the Times" by Prince, and "In the Air Tonight" by Phil Collins. The project failed; Britton recalled Proby "hated everything we ever did" and only wanted to sing "country stuff and ballads, the old-fashioned kitschy stuff."

In 1987, his Savoy Records single "M97002 Hardcore" credited Madonna as "Second Vocal (Special Guest)", although this was untrue.

=== 1990s ===
In the early 1990s Proby released an EP, "Stage of Fools", and an album, Thanks. They were issued by J'ace Records, distributed by BMG. Granada TV featured Proby in a documentary.

In the early 1990s, Proby reappeared on stage as himself in the musical Good Rockin' Tonight, followed by playing Roy Orbison in Only The Lonely. A year later Proby returned to a new production of Elvis – The Musical, and made the album Legend. It had songwriting and production from Marc Almond, and Neal X from Sigue Sigue Sputnik. A single, "Yesterday Has Gone", a duet with Almond, reached 58 on the UK Singles Chart at the end of 1996.

In 1997, Proby toured with The Who in the United States and Europe, performing as 'The Godfather' in the road production of Quadrophenia. After Quadrophenia, Proby played the UK, Sweden, Denmark, and Germany.

Proby collaborated with Savoy once more in 1999, this time narrating an audiobook of excerpts from David Britton's formerly banned novel Lord Horror.

=== 2000s–present ===
In 2002, Van Morrison recorded a song for his album Down the Road entitled "Whatever Happened to P. J. Proby?".

In August 2004, Proby toured in Australia. From February until May 2006, he appeared with the 'Solid Silver Sixties Show 2006' – and went through six road managers/drivers – throughout much of the UK, ending at the London Palladium.

In November 2008, Proby celebrated his 70th birthday. EMI released a 25-track retrospective, Best of the EMI Years 1961-1972. This featured his singles, eight rarities that debuted on the CD format, and two unreleased recordings (Les Reed and Barry Mason's "Delilah"; and Jim Ford's "I'm Ahead If I Can Quit While I'm Behind"). Reed wrote "Delilah" for Proby's 1968 album Believe It Or Not, but it was omitted and became a hit for Tom Jones. Proby wrote and recorded a Christmas single entitled "The Bells of Christmas Day" with guitarist and producer, Andy Crump.

In 2010, Proby toured in 'Sixties Gold' another revival series of shows.

In 2015, he performed in a duet with Van Morrison on the album Duets: Re-working the Catalogue, singing "Whatever Happened to P. J. Proby".

== Personal life ==
In 1968, Proby ran into tax problems and declared himself bankrupt. Proby was once arrested in Texas for vagrancy. In 1973, Proby was jailed for the shooting of an illegally-possessed weapon after threatening his partner Claudia Martin, daughter of Dean Martin, with a gun and firing several shots.

After years of heavy drinking, Proby became sober in 1992, after experiencing a heart attack while on a beach in Florida.

In 2011, Proby was charged with nine counts of benefit fraud, totalling over £47,000. He was cleared of all charges at Worcester Crown Court in March 2012. To celebrate, Proby recorded "I'm PJ." and "We The Jury" (which Proby wrote). Proby said: "I was not dishonest when I claimed benefits, which I needed in order to live."

Proby married and divorced several times. He had a relationship with singer Billie Davis. In a March 2019 interview, he said he had married Marianne Adams when she was 16, Judy Howard when she was 17, and Dulcie Taylor when she was 21 and said "The last lady in my life was Elizabeth Conway in 1997. She was 13 when I met her. I don’t think there’ll be another because it’s against the law. I won’t marry a girl I can’t raise from the age of 12, 13 or 14. I like that they’re young and fresh-looking and don’t come with baggage – nobody’s messed with their heart and broken it." Proby made these comments ahead of his 20-date farewell UK tour, which led to several shows being cancelled at first, followed by the whole tour.

Proby lives in Twyford, Worcestershire.

== Discography ==
=== Albums ===
- I Am P. J. Proby (1964) – UK Number 16
- P. J. Proby (1965)
- P. J. Proby in Town (1965)
- Enigma (1966)
- Phenomenon (1967)
- Believe It or Not (1968)
- Three Week Hero (1969)
- California License (1970)
- I'm Yours (1973)
- The Hero (1981), re-released as Clown Shoes in 1987
- Thanks (1991)
- The Enigma in Gold – Volume 1
- Memories (2003)
- Sentimental Journeys (2003)
- Wanted (2003)

=== Spoken word albums ===
- P. J. Proby Reads Lord Horror (1999, spoken word album with musical accompaniment)
- The Waste Land (1999, spoken word album of T. S. Eliot's poem)

=== Collaborative album ===
- Focus con Proby (1978) with Dutch band Focus

=== Compilations ===
- Somewhere (1977)
- The Savoy Sessions (1995)
- Legend (1996)
- 20th century Hits (2005)
- Best of the EMI Years 1961-1972 (2008)
- Sixties Gold 2010 (2010)
- The Real California License (2011)
- Greatest Hits from the Sixties (2011)

=== Early singles discography ===
==== Jett Powers ====
- "Go, Girl, Go"/"Teen Age Quarrel" (March 1958)
- "Loud Perfume"/"My Troubles" (September 1959)

==== P. J. Proby ====
- "Try to Forget Her"/"There Stands the One" (1961)
- "The Other Side of Town"/"Watch Me Walk Away" (1962)
- "So Do I"/"I Can't Take It Like You Can" (1963)

==== Orville Woods ====
- "Wicked Woman"/"Darlin'" (1963)

=== Selected singles discography ===
- "Hold Me" (1964) – UK Number 3, Canada Number 5, Australia Number 13, Ireland Number 10
- "Together" (1964) – UK Number 8, Australia Number 93
- "Somewhere" (1964) – UK Number 6, Canada Number 17
- "I Apologise" (1965) – UK Number 11
- "Rockin' Pneumonia (1965) – Canada Number 34
- "Mission Bell" (1965) – Australia Number 3
- "Let The Water Run Down" (1965) – UK Number 19, Canada Number 30
- "That Means a Lot" (1965) – UK Number 30
- "Maria" (1965) – UK Number 8
- "You've Come Back" (1966) – UK Number 25
- "To Make A Big Man Cry" (1966) – UK Number 34
- "I Can't Make It Alone" (1966) – UK Number 37
- "Niki Hoeky" (1967) – US Number 23, Canada Number 22
- "Butterfly High" (1967)
- "It's Your Day Today" (1968) – UK Number 32
- "The Day That Lorraine Came Down" (1968)
- "Hanging From Your Loving Tree" (1969)
- "Today I Killed A Man" (1969)
- "It's Goodbye" (1970)
- "We'll Meet Again" (1972)
- "Tainted Love" (1985)
- "Love Will Tear Us Apart" (1985)
- "Anarchy in the UK" (1987)
- "M97002 Hardcore" (1987)
- "Sign 'o' the Times" (1989)
- "In the Air Tonight" (1990)
- "Garbageman" (1990)
- "Stage of Fools" (1990) – (J'Ace Records)
- "Yesterday Has Gone" (1996) – UK Number 58 (Credited to P. J. Proby and Marc Almond featuring the My Life Story Orchestra)
- "Love Me Tender" (2004)
- "Oh My Papa" (2004)
- "The Bells of Christmas Day" (2008)
- "We The Jury" / "I'm PJ." (2012)
