= Oldies-45 =

- Parent company: Vee-Jay Records
- Founded: 1963
- Defunct: 1964
- Genre: Rock and roll, Rhythm and blues, Pop
- Country of origin: United States
- Location: Chicago, Illinois

Oldies-45 was an American subsidiary record label of Vee-Jay Records, a Chicago-based independent record label. Founded in 1963, Oldies-45 was established to reissue previously released 45 rpm singles marketed as "oldies but goodies." The label is best known for reissuing four Beatles singles in August 1964 during a period of intense legal dispute between Vee-Jay and Capitol Records over the rights to the Beatles' recordings in the United States.

== History ==
Vee-Jay Records was founded in 1953 by Vivian Carter and James Bracken in Gary, Indiana, with operations centred in Chicago, Illinois. Carter's brother Calvin Carter served as the label's A&R director. By the early 1960s, Vee-Jay had become the most successful Black-owned record label in the United States, generating approximately $3 million annually with a staff of twenty-two.

In mid-1962, EMI (through Transglobal Music Co., Inc.) offered Vee-Jay a licensing arrangement for Beatles recordings after Capitol Records had declined to release the group in the United States. Vee-Jay released "Please Please Me" (catalog number VJ 498) in late February 1963, making it the first Beatles single issued in the United States; early pressings misspelled the group's name as "BEATTLES."

In 1963, facing financial difficulties partly attributable to generous royalty terms negotiated with the Four Seasons, Vee-Jay created two reissue imprints: Oldies-45 for 45 rpm singles and a companion imprint, Oldies-33, for album-format reissues. The concept was described internally as "a new concept for merchandising 'oldies but goodies.'"

Following the surge of American interest in the Beatles in early 1964, Capitol Records obtained a court injunction on January 15, 1964, against Vee-Jay manufacturing Beatles recordings, asserting that Vee-Jay's rights had been cancelled on August 8, 1963, due to non-payment of royalties. The legal contest was prolonged and bitter. Calvin Carter later described the situation: "They would get an injunction against us on Monday, and we would get it off on Friday, then we'd press over the weekend and ship on Monday."

On April 9, 1964, Vee-Jay and Capitol reached a settlement under which Vee-Jay received a license to continue selling its existing Beatles product while paying Capitol royalties, including substantial back payments. The settlement permitted Vee-Jay to sell its previously released Beatles records until October 15, 1964, after which all rights would revert to Capitol. Carter reflected on the outcome: "We finally made something out of the court settlement, because we just couldn't afford to fight that big a company." By the time the license expired, 1.3 million copies of Introducing... the Beatles had been sold.

== Releases ==
In August 1964, as the October deadline approached, Vee-Jay reissued four Beatles singles on the Oldies-45 label. All four were released simultaneously on August 10, 1964, bearing consecutive OL-series catalog numbers:

Catalog number	A-side	B-side
OL-149	"Do You Want to Know a Secret"	"Thank You Girl"
OL-150	"Please Please Me"	"From Me to You"
OL-151	"Love Me Do"	"P.S. I Love You"
OL-152	"Twist and Shout"	"There's a Place"

The releases drew on recordings originally issued on the main Vee-Jay label or on Tollie Records, another Vee-Jay subsidiary.

Beyond the Beatles material, the Oldies-45 label reissued recordings by other Vee-Jay artists. Discographic records show releases in the lower OL-100s, including material by The Impressions featuring Jerry Butler.

== Legacy ==
Vee-Jay Records declared bankruptcy in 1966. The Oldies-45 trademark was subsequently claimed by Vee-Jay's successor organization. Betty Chiapetta, associated with that successor organization, noted that "The Oldies 45 label is still owned by Vee Jay, although a lot of other people have been using it," and announced plans to reissue original singles to counter unauthorized use of the imprint.

The masters from the Oldies-45 catalog were subsequently licensed to other labels including Springboard, Charly, and Buddah Records, indicating the catalog retained commercial value well beyond the label's operational period.

== See also ==
- Vee-Jay Records
- Tollie Records
- The Beatles discography
- Capitol Records
- Introducing... the Beatles
