= On Air – Live at the BBC Volume 2 =

Live album / compilation album by the Beatles
- Released: 11 November 2013
- Recorded: 22 January 1963 – 2 May 1966
- Genre: Rock and roll, pop, interview
- Length: 130:34
- Label: Apple, Capitol, Calderstone, Universal Music Enterprises
- Producer: Jeff Jones, Mike Heatley, Kevin Howlett

The Beatles chronology
Tomorrow Never Knows (2012)	On Air – Live at the BBC Volume 2 (2013)	The Beatles Bootleg Recordings 1963 (2013)

On Air – Live at the BBC Volume 2 is a 2013 live/compilation album featuring 40 previously unreleased tracks from the Beatles' 1963–1964 BBC Radio broadcasts (accompanied by 23 interview tracks from the associated broadcasts). It was released on 11 November 2013, along with a remastered and repackaged Live at the BBC Volume 1, which was originally released in 1994. The album is available as a two-CD set and a three-LP set. An exclusive limited edition lithographic print is also available from the Beatles online store.

== Content ==
Most of the songs performed live on the album are taken from the Beatles' first four LPs Please Please Me, With the Beatles, A Hard Day's Night and Beatles for Sale. Many of the other songs performed are the band's covers of early rock and roll classics by American artists such as Little Richard, Chuck Berry and Buddy Holly, many of which were never recorded in a studio or released on a Beatles album during the group's time together. "I'm Talking About You" had appeared on various releases, of dubious legality, from 1977 onwards featuring material recorded in December 1962 at the Star Club in Hamburg, Germany. "Beautiful Dreamer" had never been on a previous Beatles release, leaving only "Dream Baby (How Long Must I Dream)" and "A Picture of You", both low fidelity recordings with Pete Best from 1962, as the only songs from the Beatles' BBC performances that have never been issued in any version.

There are several witty and irreverent moments among the 23 speech tracks of in-studio conversation and banter with Brian Matthew, presenter of radio's 'Saturday Club' and 'Easy Beat'. "A Hard Job Writing Them", for example, includes the moment where Ringo describes the trouble he had writing songs for A Hard Day's Night and Paul launches the ship "Top Gear" in an unusual voice.

== Reception ==
Professional ratings
Aggregate scores
Source	Rating
Metacritic	82/100
Review scores
Source	Rating
AllMusic	4/5 stars
Classic Rock	4/5 stars
Clash	9/10
The Independent	5/5 stars
Mojo	4/5 stars
Pitchfork	7.2/10
Q	4/5 stars
Rolling Stone	4/5 stars
Spin	8/10
Uncut	8/10

The album received very positive reviews upon release. Damian Fanelli from Guitar World said the album is "an exceedingly satisfying release, yet another example of how talented, charming and generally 'different' the Beatles were. In terms of George Harrison's guitar playing, we get to hear the good (his whammy-bar-laced guitar solo on 'Till There Was You'), the not so good (his solo on 'Lucille') and the intriguing (His better-than-the-EMI-version solo on 'I Saw Her Standing There' inspires a few 'What ifs?')."

Mojo music writer Jon Savage reviewed the album, giving it four stars and stated, "There are several surprises: a tough version of Chuck Berry's 'I'm Talking About You', an early 'Words of Love', covers of 'Lend Me Your Comb' and 'Beautiful Dreamer'."

== Track listing ==
Speech tracks are in italics.

All tracks are written by Lennon–McCartney, except where noted (and excluding all spoken word tracks).

Side one
No.	Title	Writer(s)	Lead vocals	Length
1.	"And Here We Are Again" (Pop Go the Beatles, 23 July 1963)			0:15
2.	"Words of Love" (Pop Go the Beatles, 20 August 1963)	Buddy Holly	John Lennon, Paul McCartney	1:56
3.	"How About It, Gorgeous?" (Pop Go the Beatles, 30 July 1963)			0:27
4.	"Do You Want to Know a Secret" (Pop Go the Beatles, 30 July 1963)		George Harrison	1:48
5.	"Lucille" (Pop Go the Beatles, 17 September 1963)	Al Collins, Little Richard	McCartney	2:29
6.	"Hey, Paul..." (Pop Go the Beatles, 25 June 1963)			0:21
7.	"Anna (Go to Him)" (Pop Go the Beatles, 27 August 1963)	Arthur Alexander	Lennon	2:50
8.	"Hello!" (Pop Go the Beatles, 25 June 1963)			0:19
9.	"Please Please Me" (Pop Go the Beatles, 13 August 1963)		Lennon, McCartney	1:56
10.	"Misery" (Here We Go, 12 March 1963)		Lennon, McCartney	1:50
11.	"I'm Talking About You" (Saturday Club, 16 March 1963)	Chuck Berry	Lennon	1:52
12.	"A Real Treat" (Pop Go the Beatles, 25 June 1963)			0:37
13.	"Boys" (Pop Go the Beatles, 25 June 1963)	Luther Dixon, Wes Farrell	Ringo Starr	2:29
14.	"Absolutely Fab" (Pop Go the Beatles, 25 June 1963)			0:27
15.	"Chains" (Pop Go the Beatles, 25 June 1963)	Gerry Goffin, Carole King	Harrison	2:15
16.	"Ask Me Why" (Pop Go the Beatles, 24 September 1963)		Lennon	1:54

Side two
No.	Title	Writer(s)	Lead vocals	Length
17.	"Till There Was You" (Pop Go the Beatles, 30 July 1963)	Meredith Willson	McCartney	2:16
18.	"Lend Me Your Comb" (Pop Go the Beatles, 16 July 1963)	Kay Twomey, Fred Wise, Ben Weisman	Lennon, McCartney	1:46
19.	"Lower 5E" (Pop Go the Beatles, 10 September 1963)			0:23
20.	"Hippy Hippy Shake" (Pop Go the Beatles, 10 September 1963)	Chan Romero	McCartney	1:46
21.	"Roll Over Beethoven" (Pop Go the Beatles, 3 September 1963)	Berry	Harrison	2:22
22.	"There's a Place" (Pop Go the Beatles, 3 September 1963)		Lennon, McCartney	1:49
23.	"Bumper Bundle" (Pop Go the Beatles, 25 June 1963)			0:49
24.	"P.S. I Love You" (Pop Go the Beatles, 25 June 1963)		McCartney	1:59
25.	"Please Mr. Postman" (Pop Go the Beatles, 30 July 1963)	Georgia Dobbins, William Garrett, Freddie Gorman, Brian Holland, Robert Bateman	Lennon	2:17
26.	"Beautiful Dreamer" (Saturday Club, 26 January 1963)	Stephen Foster, Gerry Goffin, Jack Keller	McCartney	1:46
27.	"Devil in Her Heart" (Pop Go the Beatles, 24 September 1963)	Richard Drapkin	Harrison	2:22
28.	"The 49 Weeks" (Pop Go the Beatles, 24 September 1963)			0:17
29.	"Sure to Fall (in Love with You)" (Pop Go the Beatles, 24 September 1963)	Carl Perkins, Bill Cantrell, Quinton Claunch	McCartney	2:21
30.	"Never Mind, Eh?" (Pop Go the Beatles, 24 September 1963)			0:34
31.	"Twist and Shout" (Pop Go the Beatles, 6 August 1963)	Phil Medley, Bert Berns	Lennon	2:25
32.	"Bye, Bye" (Pop Go the Beatles, 24 September 1963)			0:24

Side five
No.	Title	Length
33.	"John – Pop Profile" (BBC Transcription Service, 30 November 1965)	8:22
34.	"George – Pop Profile" (BBC Transcription Service, 30 November 1965)	8:06
Total length:		1:05:49

Side three
No.	Title	Writer(s)	Lead vocals	Length
1.	"I Saw Her Standing There" (Saturday Club, 5 October 1963)		McCartney	2:36
2.	"Glad All Over" (Saturday Club, 24 August 1963)	Aaron Schroeder, Sid Tepper, Roy Bennett	Harrison	1:53
3.	"Lift Lid Again" (Saturday Club, 24 August 1963)			0:37
4.	"I'll Get You" (Saturday Club, 5 October 1963)		Lennon, McCartney	2:02
5.	"She Loves You" (Saturday Club, 5 October 1963)		Lennon, McCartney	2:15
6.	"Memphis, Tennessee" (Saturday Club, 5 October 1963)	Berry	Lennon	2:15
7.	"Happy Birthday Dear Saturday Club" (Saturday Club, 5 October 1963)	Mildred J. Hill, Patty Hill, arr. John Lennon, Paul McCartney, George Harrison, Richard Starkey	Lennon, McCartney, Harrison, Starr	0:33
8.	"Now Hush, Hush" (Easy Beat, 20 October 1963)			0:25
9.	"From Me to You" (Easy Beat, 20 October 1963)		Lennon, McCartney	1:51
10.	"Money (That's What I Want)" (From Us to You, 26 December 1963)	Janie Bradford, Berry Gordy	Lennon	2:43
11.	"I Want to Hold Your Hand" (From Us to You, 26 December 1963)		Lennon, McCartney	2:23
12.	"Brian Bathtubes" (Saturday Club, 21 December 1963)			0:59
13.	"This Boy" (Saturday Club, 21 December 1963)		Lennon, McCartney, Harrison	2:16
14.	"If I Wasn't in America" (Saturday Club, 15 February 1964)			0:45

Side four
No.	Title	Writer(s)	Lead vocals	Length
15.	"I Got A Woman" (Saturday Club, 4 April 1964)	Ray Charles, Renald Richard	Lennon	2:36
16.	"Long Tall Sally" (Top Gear, 16 July 1964)	Enotris Johnson, Robert Blackwell, Richard Penniman	McCartney	1:58
17.	"If I Fell" (Top Gear, 16 July 1964)		Lennon, McCartney	2:09
18.	"A Hard Job Writing Them" (Top Gear, 16 July 1964)			1:20
19.	"And I Love Her" (Top Gear, 16 July 1964)		McCartney	2:20
20.	"Oh, Can't We? Yes We Can" (From Us to You, 30 March 1964)			0:20
21.	"You Can't Do That" (Top Gear, 16 July 1964)		Lennon	2:32
22.	"Honey Don't" (Top Gear, 26 November 1964)	Perkins	Starr	2:24
23.	"I'll Follow the Sun" (Top Gear, 26 November 1964)		McCartney	1:51
24.	"Green with Black Shutters" (Top of the Pops BBC Transcription Service, May/June 1965)			0:59
25.	"Kansas City / Hey-Hey-Hey-Hey!" (Saturday Club, 26 December 1964)	Jerry Leiber, Mike Stoller / Penniman	McCartney	2:43
26.	"That's What We're Here For" (Top Gear, 26 November 1964)			0:24
27.	"I Feel Fine" (Top Gear outtake)		Lennon	3:29

Side six
No.	Title	Length
28.	"Paul – Pop Profile" (BBC Transcription Service, 2 May 1966)	7:50
29.	"Ringo – Pop Profile" (BBC Transcription Service, 2 May 1966)	8:04
Total length:		1:04:32

== Source programmes ==
The show's title and original broadcast date for each track, with the recording date in parentheses:

Saturday Club, 26 January 1963 (22 January 1963)

Disc 1

26. "Beautiful Dreamer"

Here We Go, 12 March 1963 (6 March 1963)

Disc 1

10. "Misery"

Saturday Club, 16 March 1963 (transmitted live)

Disc 1

11. "I'm Talking About You"

Pop Go the Beatles (4), 25 June 1963 (17 June 1963)

Disc 1

6. "Hey, Paul..."
8. "Hello!"
12. "A Real Treat"
13. "Boys"
14. "Absolutely Fab"
15. "Chains"
23. "Bumper Bundle"
24. "P.S. I Love You"

Pop Go the Beatles (5), 16 July 1963 (2 July 1963)

Disc 1

18. "Lend Me Your Comb"

Pop Go the Beatles (6), 23 July 1963 (10 July 1963)

Disc 1

1. "And Here We Are Again"

Pop Go the Beatles (7), 30 July 1963 (10 July 1963)

Disc 1

3. "How About It, Gorgeous?"
4. "Do You Want to Know a Secret"
17. "Till There Was You"
25. "Please Mr. Postman"

Pop Go the Beatles (8), 6 August 1963 (16 July 1963)

Disc 1

31. "Twist and Shout"

Pop Go the Beatles (9), 13 August 1963 (16 July 1963)

Disc 1

9. "Please Please Me"

Pop Go the Beatles (10), 20 August 1963 (16 July 1963)

Disc 1

2. "Words of Love"

Saturday Club, 24 August 1963 (30 July 1963)

Disc 2

2. "Glad All Over"
3. "Lift Lid Again"

Pop Go the Beatles (11), 27 August 1963 (1 August 1963)

Disc 1

7. "Anna (Go to Him)"

Pop Go the Beatles (12), 3 September 1963 (1 August 1963)

Disc 1

21. "Roll Over Beethoven"
22. "There's a Place"

Pop Go the Beatles (13), 10 September 1963 (3 September 1963)

Disc 1

19. "Lower 5E"
20. "Hippy Hippy Shake"

Pop Go the Beatles (14), 17 September 1963 (3 September 1963)

Disc 1

5. "Lucille"

Pop Go the Beatles (15), 24 September 1963 (3 September 1963)

Disc 1

16. "Ask Me Why"
27. "Devil in Her Heart"
28. "The 49 Weeks"
29. "Sure to Fall (In Love with You)"
30. "Never Mind, Eh?"
32. "Bye, Bye"

Saturday Club, 5 October 1963 (7 September 1963)

Disc 2

1. "I Saw Her Standing There"
4. "I'll Get You"
5. "She Loves You"
6. "Memphis, Tennessee"
7. "Happy Birthday Dear Saturday Club"

Easy Beat, 20 October 1963 (16 October 1963)

Disc 2

8. "Now Hush, Hush"
9. "From Me to You"

Saturday Club, 21 December 1963 (17 December 1963)

Disc 2

12. "Brian Bathtubes"
13. "This Boy"

From Us to You (1), 26 December 1963 (18 December 1963)

Disc 2

10. "Money (That's What I Want)"
11. "I Want to Hold Your Hand"

Saturday Club, 15 February 1964 (7 January 1964)

Disc 2

14. "If I Wasn't in America"

From Us to You (2), 30 March 1964 (28 February 1964)

Disc 2

20. "Oh, Can't We? Yes We Can"

Saturday Club, 4 April 1964 (31 March 1964)

Disc 2

15. "I Got a Woman"

Top Gear, 16 July 1964 (14 July 1964)

Disc 2

16. "Long Tall Sally"
17. "If I Fell"
18. "A Hard Job Writing Them"
19. "And I Love Her"
21. "You Can't Do That"

Top Gear, 26 November 1964 (17 November 1964)

Disc 2

22. "Honey Don't"
23. "I'll Follow the Sun"
26. "That's What We're Here For"
27. "I Feel Fine" (unaired)

Saturday Club, 26 December 1964 (25 November 1964)

Disc 2

25. "Kansas City / Hey-Hey-Hey-Hey!"

Top of the Pops BBC Transcription Service, May or June 1965

Disc 2

24. "Green with Black Shutters"

BBC Transcription Service, 30 November 1965

Disc 1

33. "John – Pop Profile"
34. "George – Pop Profile"

BBC Transcription Service, 2 May 1966

Disc 2

28. "Paul – Pop Profile"
29. "Ringo – Pop Profile"

== Personnel ==
- John Lennon – vocals, rhythm guitar, harmonica
- Paul McCartney – vocals, bass guitar, guitar
- George Harrison – lead guitar, vocals
- Ringo Starr – drums, percussion, vocals

== Charts and certifications ==
=== Weekly charts ===
Chart (2013)	Peak position
Australian Albums (ARIA)	28
Austrian Albums (Ö3 Austria)	7
Belgian Albums (Ultratop Flanders)	17
Belgian Albums (Ultratop Wallonia)	27
Canadian Albums (Billboard)	7
Czech Albums (ČNS IFPI)	31
Danish Albums (Hitlisten)	26
Dutch Albums (Album Top 100)	6
Finnish Albums (Suomen virallinen lista)	18
French Albums (SNEP)	26
German Albums (Offizielle Top 100)	8
Greek Albums (IFPI)	11
Irish Albums (IRMA)	19
Italian Albums (FIMI)	26
New Zealand Albums (RMNZ)	31
Norwegian Albums (VG-lista)	9
Portuguese Albums (AFP)	30
Spanish Albums (Promusicae)	16
Swedish Albums (Sverigetopplistan)	36
Swiss Albums (Schweizer Hitparade)	19
UK Albums (OCC)	12
US Billboard 200	7
US Top Rock Albums (Billboard)	1

=== Year-end charts ===
Chart (2013)	Position
Dutch Albums (Album Top 100)	72
UK Albums (OCC)	166
Chart (2014)	Position
US Top Rock Albums (Billboard)	56

=== Certifications ===
Region	Certification	Certified units/sales
Canada (Music Canada)	Platinum	80,000^{^}
United Kingdom (BPI)	Silver	60,000^{*}
^{*} Sales figures based on certification alone.^{^} Shipments figures based on certification alone.

== See also ==
- Outline of the Beatles
- The Beatles timeline
