= The Early Beatles =

Studio album by the Beatles
- Released: 22 March 1965
- Recorded: 11 September 1962 – 20 February 1963
- Studio: EMI, London
- Genre: Rock and roll
- Length: 26:26
- Label: Capitol
- Producer: George Martin
- Compiler: Dave Dexter Jr.

The Beatles North American chronology
| Beatles '65 (1964) | The Early Beatles (1965) | Beatles VI (1965) |

Professional ratings
Review scores
| Source | Rating |
|---|---|
| AllMusic | 3.5/5 stars |
| The Encyclopedia of Popular Music | 2/5 stars |
| The Rolling Stone Record Guide | 5/5 stars |

The Early Beatles is the Beatles' sixth album released on Capitol Records, and their eighth album overall for the American market. All eleven tracks on this album were previously issued on the Vee-Jay Records release Introducing... The Beatles, released in January, 1964. The front cover photo for this album features the same back cover photo for the British LP Beatles for Sale.

The album is included in Robert Christgau's "Basic Record Library" of 1950s and 1960s recordings, published in Christgau's Record Guide: Rock Albums of the Seventies (1981).

== Background ==
Vee-Jay Records had gained American distribution rights to the tracks on this album before the Beatles became popular in America (Capitol Records, the US subsidiary of EMI which owned the Beatles' record label Parlophone, had declined to release the group's records in America), and their releases had initially failed to chart. But after the group became famous, Vee-Jay, still holding the rights to the early material, was able to reissue them in America and this time the records sold in the millions. Capitol filed a lawsuit attempting to stop Vee Jay from distributing the tracks, but was unsuccessful. In October 1964, Vee-Jay's license to distribute the Beatles recordings it possessed expired, thus giving Capitol the distribution rights for the tracks on the album.

== Release and reception ==
Although Vee-Jay (and subsidiary, Tollie Records) had compiled four albums, ten singles and one EP in the space of just fifteen months from these Beatles tracks, when issued by Capitol, The Early Beatles sold well, but its highest position on the Billboard chart was only number 43, making it the only original Beatles album issued by Capitol or United Artists Records not to reach numbers 1 or 2 in America (with the exception of the Capitol documentary album, The Beatles' Story, which peaked at number 7). Capitol did little to promote The Early Beatles since the label merely viewed it as a replacement for Introducing...The Beatles, rather than a "new" Beatles album. The Early Beatles was certified Gold ($1 million in sales) on 8 January 1974 and Platinum (1 million copies sold) on 10 January 1997 by the RIAA. The album was released in both mono and stereo versions. As no stereo masters of "Love Me Do" and "P.S. I Love You" exist, Capitol used duophonic mixes of both songs. The mono pressing of the album was made with a two-to-one fold-down of the stereo tapes, as evidenced by John and Paul's vocal collision and chuckle heard in the third verse of "Please Please Me". The original mix on the UK mono issue of the Please Please Me album uses an edit to correct the mistake, while the stereo version of the same album does not. So the existence of the vocal error in a mono mix is unique to The Early Beatles as well as a short-lived Capitol Starline 45 rpm single released in October, 1965 and deleted only two months later.

=== Compact disc ===
The Early Beatles is available on compact disc as part of The Capitol Albums, Volume 2 boxed set (catalogue number CDP 0946 3 57498 2 3), in both its original stereo and mono fold-down Capitol mixes. In 2014, a second CD version of The Early Beatles containing the 2009 remastered UK stereo and mono mixes, was issued individually and as part of the Beatles The U.S. Albums boxed set.

=== Vinyl reissue ===
In 2024, the album was reissued on vinyl as part of The Beatles: 1964 U.S. Albums in Mono, using the original Capitol master tapes rather than the UK mixes.

== Personnel ==
- John Lennon – rhythm guitar, acoustic guitar, harmonica, vocals
- Paul McCartney – bass guitar, vocals
- George Harrison – lead guitar, acoustic guitar, vocals
- Ringo Starr – drums, tambourine, maracas, vocals
- Andy White – drums on Love Me Do and P.S. I Love You
- George Martin – celesta on Baby It's You

== Track listing ==
The album consists of eleven of the fourteen tracks from the Beatles' first American album Introducing...The Beatles as well as their first British LP Please Please Me. All songs written by Lennon-McCartney except where noted.

Side one
| No. | Title | Writer(s) | Length |
|---|---|---|---|
| 1. | "Love Me Do" | | 2:23 |
| 2. | "Twist and Shout" | Phil Medley; Bert Russell | 2:33 |
| 3. | "Anna (Go to Him)" | Arthur Alexander | 3:00 |
| 4. | "Chains" | Gerry Goffin; Carole King | 2:27 |
| 5. | "Boys" | Luther Dixon; Wes Farrell | 2:25 |
| 6. | "Ask Me Why" | | 2:28 |
| Total length: | | | 15:16 |

Side two
| No. | Title | Writer(s) | Length |
|---|---|---|---|
| 1. | "Please Please Me" | | 2:00 |
| 2. | "P.S. I Love You" | | 2:05 |
| 3. | "Baby It's You" | Burt Bacharach; Mack David; Luther Dixon | 2:38 |
| 4. | "A Taste of Honey" | Ric Marlow; Bobby Scott | 2:04 |
| 5. | "Do You Want to Know a Secret" | | 1:59 |
| Total length: | | | 10:46 |

=== Remaining Vee-Jay tracks issued on LP by Capitol in the US ===
| Title | Single | Album |
|---|---|---|
| "I Saw Her Standing There" | Capitol 5112–1964 (released prior to The Early Beatles) | Meet the Beatles!—1964 (released prior to The Early Beatles) |
| "Thank You Girl" | Capitol Starline 6064–1965 | The Beatles' Second Album—1964 (released prior to The Early Beatles) |
| "From Me to You" | Capitol Starline 6063–1965 | 1962–1966—1973 |
| "Misery" | Capitol Starline 6066–1965 | Rarities—1980 |
| "There's a Place" | Capitol Starline 6061–1965 | Rarities—1980 |

8-track editions of this album include "Roll Over Beethoven" written by Chuck Berry

== Charts and certifications ==
=== Chart performance ===
| Chart (1965) | Peak position |
|---|---|
| US Billboard Top LPs | 43 |

| Chart (2025) | Peak position |
|---|---|
| Greek Albums (IFPI) | 44 |

=== Certifications ===
| Region | Certification | Certified units/sales |
|---|---|---|
| Canada (Music Canada) | Platinum | 100,000^{^} |
| United States (RIAA) | Platinum | 1,000,000^{^} |
^{^} Shipments figures based on certification alone.
