= Off the Beatle Track =

Studio album by George Martin & His Orchestra
- Released: 10 July 1964
- Recorded: June–July 1964
- Studios: EMI, London
- Genre: Easy listening
- Length: 26:17
- Labels: United Artists (US); Parlophone (UK)
- Producer: George Martin

George Martin & His Orchestra chronology
| Off the Beatle Track (1964) | By Popular Demand, A Hard Day's Night (1964) |

Professional ratings
Review scores
| Source | Rating |
|---|---|
| Allmusic | 3/5 stars |

Off the Beatle Track is a 1964 album by George Martin & His Orchestra, released 10 July by United Artists Records in the United States and 3 August by Parlophone in the United Kingdom.

It is the first of a series of albums by Martin featuring instrumental arrangements of songs by The Beatles, for whom he served as producer, arranger, and occasional accompanying musician. It is also the first LP that Martin released under his own name. This album was later issued on CD by One Way Records. Later that same year, four of these recordings were reused for the album By Popular Demand, A Hard Day's Night.

Despite its "Beatles" association — the album's title was originally suggested for the Beatles' debut album and the liner notes are even written by John Lennon — and being released at the height of Beatlemania in both the UK and USA, the album did not sell in large quantities. As a result, it is now a collector's item, with copies selling for in excess of £100.

== Track listing ==
Tracks 1, 3, 6 and 8 are included on Martin's soundtrack album By Popular Demand, A Hard Day's Night.

All tracks are written by Lennon–McCartney, except where noted

Side one
| No. | Title | Length |
|---|---|---|
| 1. | "She Loves You" | 2:20 |
| 2. | "Can't Buy Me Love" | 2:08 |
| 3. | "Don't Bother Me" (George Harrison) | 2:58 |
| 4. | "All I've Got to Do" | 2:08 |
| 5. | "I Saw Her Standing There" | 2:11 |
| 6. | "All My Loving" | 2:46 |

Side two
| No. | Title | Length |
|---|---|---|
| 7. | "Please Please Me" | 2:00 |
| 8. | "I Want to Hold Your Hand" | 2:17 |
| 9. | "From Me to You" | 1:48 |
| 10. | "Little Child" | 1:50 |
| 11. | "This Boy" | 2:17 |
| 12. | "There's a Place" | 2:00 |
