= Introducing... The Beatles =

Studio album by the Beatles
- Released: 10 January 1964
- Recorded: 11 September 1962 – 11 February 1963
- Studios: EMI, London
- Genres: Merseybeat; rock and roll; pop
- Length: 27:39
- Label: Vee-Jay
- Producer: George Martin

The Beatles North American chronology
| Beatlemania! With the Beatles (1963) | Introducing... The Beatles (1964) | Meet the Beatles! (1964) |

The Beatles United States chronology
| Introducing... The Beatles (1964) | Meet the Beatles! (1964) |

Singles from Introducing... The Beatles
- 1. "Please Please Me" Released: 25 February 1963; 2. "Twist and Shout" Released: 2 March 1964; 3. "Do You Want to Know a Secret" Released: 23 March 1964; 4. "Love Me Do" Released: 27 April 1964

Professional ratings
Review scores
| Source | Rating |
|---|---|
| AllMusic | 3/5 stars |
| The Encyclopedia of Popular Music | 3/5 stars |

Introducing... The Beatles is the first studio album released by the English rock band the Beatles in the United States. Originally scheduled for a July 1963 release, the LP came out on 10 January 1964, on Vee-Jay Records, ten days before Capitol's Meet the Beatles! The latter album, however, entered the U.S. album chart one week before the former. Consequently, when Meet The Beatles! peaked at No. 1 for eleven consecutive weeks, Introducing...The Beatles stalled at No. 2 where it remained for nine consecutive weeks. It was the subject of much legal dispute, but ultimately, Vee-Jay was permitted to sell the album until late 1964, by which time it had sold more than 1.3 million copies. On 24 July 2014 the album was certified gold and platinum by the RIAA.

== Initial non-release ==
The Beatles' recording contract that began May 1962 with Parlophone in the United Kingdom gave the parent corporation EMI rights to offer any of the group's recordings to the various labels EMI owned in many countries of the world. However, EMI's United States subsidiary, Capitol Records, declined to release the "Please Please Me" single. Following this, Transglobal, an EMI affiliate that worked to place foreign masters with US record companies, negotiated with several labels before Vee-Jay Records signed a licensing agreement giving it the right of first refusal on Beatles' records for five years. As part of that agreement, even after its singles releases of "Please Please Me" and "From Me to You" failed to chart above No. 116 on the Billboard Hot 100, Vee-Jay planned to release the Please Please Me album in the US, and received copies of the mono and stereo master tapes in late April or early May 1963.

Originally, Vee-Jay considered releasing the Please Please Me LP unaltered, as it appeared in the UK. A surviving acetate made by Universal Recording Corporation of Chicago, probably in May 1963, contains all 14 songs in the same order as on the UK album, with the title still listed as Please Please Me. But in keeping with the American norm of a 12-song album, Vee-Jay chose instead to omit "Please Please Me" and "Ask Me Why" (which had comprised the first single release) and change the album's title to Introducing... The Beatles. Also, the engineer at Universal in Chicago thought that Paul McCartney's count-in at the start of "I Saw Her Standing There" was extraneous rather than intentionally placed there, so he snipped the "one, two, three" (leaving the "four") from Vee-Jay's mono and stereo masters. Except for those omissions, the order and contents of the album were untouched, resulting in a US album that bore the closest resemblance to a British Beatles LP until Sgt. Pepper's Lonely Hearts Club Band in 1967.

Preparations for the LP's release continued in late June and early July 1963, including the manufacturing of masters and metal parts and the printing of 6,000 front covers. But, despite the claims of many older Beatles books and discographies that Introducing... The Beatles was first released on 22 July 1963, no documentation exists to confirm that the album was released at any time in 1963.

A management shake-up at Vee-Jay, which included the resignation of the label's president Ewart Abner after he used company money to cover personal gambling debts, resulted in the cancellation of the release of Introducing... The Beatles and albums by Frank Ifield, Alma Cogan and a Jewish cantor.

== Version one ==
Vee-Jay's financial problems forced it to take care of its most pressing debt first. Because the Beatles and Ifield were low priorities, the label chose not to report royalties on their sales. As a result, Transglobal declared its contract with Vee-Jay null and void on 8 August 1963. The next single, "She Loves You", was licensed by Transglobal to the Swan label of Philadelphia.

On 14 December 1963, Billboard magazine mentioned that Capitol Records planned an all-out promotional campaign for the Beatles in the United States. Following that, the single "I Want to Hold Your Hand" was rush released on 26 December. On 7 January 1964, Vee-Jay's board of directors met for the first time since the single was released, and it discussed the Beatles' material it had in the vault. Desperate for cash, the board decided to release Introducing... The Beatles, even if it meant legal trouble in the future.

Metal parts were already at Vee-Jay's three primary pressing plants, and 6,000 front covers were already printed. But it had no back cover prepared. So, as a stopgap, the label used a back cover slick made from one side of its standard inner sleeve, consisting of full-colour reproductions of the covers of 25 "other fine albums of significant interest". This cover is known by collectors as the "Ad Back" version and is highly sought. A second stopgap back cover was used when the "Ad Back" slicks were exhausted; because it is all-white with no printing at all, it is known by collectors as the "Blank Back" edition and is also very rare. Finally, third editions contain Vee-Jay's official back cover, with Introducing The Beatles near the top and the song titles in two columns underneath. All of these were available on the market within days of the 10 January release date. Also in January, "Please Please Me" was reissued as a single, this time with "From Me to You" as the B-side.

But on 16 January 1964, less than a week after Introducing... The Beatles was released, Vee-Jay was served with a restraining order stopping further distribution. Beechwood Music, Inc., Capitol Records' publishing subsidiary, owned the American publishing rights to "Love Me Do" and "P.S. I Love You", and because the two songs had not yet been officially released in the US, Beechwood refused to issue a license for Vee-Jay to release them. Approximately 80,000 copies of Introducing... The Beatles had been released with the two songs on them, with only 2,000 or so in stereo.

== Version two ==
To circumvent the restraining order, Vee-Jay quickly reconfigured Introducing... The Beatles. It removed "Love Me Do" and "P.S. I Love You" and replaced them with the previously omitted "Ask Me Why" and "Please Please Me", though some pressings of the album did not alter the track list. The new versions were prepared in late January and began appearing in stores around 10 February 1964.

Because of the initial restraining order, version two of Introducing... The Beatles did not enter the Billboard charts until three weeks after Capitol's Meet the Beatles! album. Once it did, it quickly rose to the number two spot, where it stayed for nine straight weeks. It also peaked at number two in Cash Box, and it got to number one in Record World magazine. This success inspired a host of other Vee-Jay releases. First came the album Jolly What! England's Greatest Recording Stars: The Beatles and Frank Ifield on Stage issued on 26 February, containing the Beatles tracks "Please Please Me", "From Me to You", "Ask Me Why" and "Thank You Girl" from the 1963 singles and Introducing..., and other tracks from Frank Ifield. The rereleased single "Please Please Me" rose to number three on the Hot 100, Cash Box and Record World. Soon after, "Twist and Shout" was released 2 March on the subsidiary Tollie label with "There's a Place" as the B-side, and "Do You Want to Know a Secret", with "Thank You Girl" on the B-side, was issued on 23 March. Both singles went up to number two on the Hot 100, with "Twist and Shout" reaching number one on both Cash Box and Record World. Also a Beatles EP titled Souvenir of Their Visit to America was released by Vee-Jay on 23 March, featuring "Misery", "A Taste of Honey", "Ask Me Why", and "Anna".

Even with the replacement of the two Beechwood Music songs, Vee-Jay and Capitol battled in court throughout the early part of 1964. Injunctions against Vee-Jay's album were issued, lifted and restored more than once. Because the album was often pressed quickly between restraining orders, there are almost two dozen different label variations, including mono and stereo copies, manufactured at numerous pressing plants. Finally, on 9 April 1964, the two labels settled. Vee-Jay was granted a license giving it the right to issue the 16 Beatles' songs it controlled, in any way it saw fit, until 15 October 1964. At that time, its license expired, and all rights would revert to Capitol. During the time Introducing... The Beatles was available, it sold approximately 1,300,000 mono copies and approximately 41,000 stereo copies. Because only 3.1 percent of all of the LPs were in stereo, true stereo copies are rare.

After the settlement, the Beechwood songs were issued by Vee-Jay as a single, on 27 April on Tollie. "Love Me Do"/"P.S. I Love You" rose to become the Beatles' fourth number one single on Billboard and their fifth on both Cash Box and Record World.

== Other versions ==
Twice before its license expired, Vee-Jay repackaged Introducing... The Beatles. Although neither album contained any new music, both of them made the Billboard album charts.

=== Songs, Pictures and Stories of the Fabulous Beatles ===
One of these was Songs, Pictures and Stories of the Fabulous Beatles (Vee-Jay VJLP(S)-1092), which featured a three-quarters gatefold cover, portrait paintings of the four musicians and the text:

"Look inside. Complete story of their favourite male and female singer, their favourite foods, types of girls, sport, hobby, songs, colours, real name, birthplace, birthdays, height, education, color of hair & eyes."

The inside cover text describes Paul as the "Nut Beatle" or "Beatle Nut", John as "nearsighted" and the "Chief Beatle", George as the "quietest" and the "one with the deadpan face" and Ringo as the "shortest Beatle" who "will send his steak back if it is not blood red". The back sleeve shows outlines of hearts below each Beatle-photo and holds instructions of how to fill the hearts with personal photos.

The record inside the cover did not even contain the new name; it still stated Introducing... The Beatles on the label. Songs, Pictures and Stories was released either in late July 1964 or 12 October 1964, with the latter the more likely date, because it entered the Billboard album chart on 31 October. It eventually peaked at number 63.

=== The Beatles vs the Four Seasons ===
The other repackaging was the two-record set The Beatles vs the Four Seasons, which contained copies of Introducing... The Beatles in one pocket of the gatefold cover and Golden Hits of the Four Seasons (VJLP 1065), a compilation album featuring Vee-Jay's other marquee artist The Four Seasons, in the other. This Vee-Jay creation spent three weeks on the Billboard chart in October 1964 and peaked at number 142. The cover artwork for this version was later parodied for the bootleg release The Beatles vs the Third Reich, featuring the band's 1962 Star-Club recordings.

Though Vee-Jay could not manufacture or distribute any Beatles product after 15 October 1964, it took a long time for the records to vanish from retail stores. Both Introducing... The Beatles and Songs, Pictures and Stories of the Fabulous Beatles remained on the Billboard LP chart until 9 January 1965.

=== After Vee Jay license expired: The Early Beatles, Rarities ===
From the start of Beatlemania in the United States until the October 1964 expiration of its rights to Beatles music, Vee-Jay issued four LP albums, four singles, and an EP out of the 16 tracks it gained from its 1963 license period. On 22 March 1965, Capitol issued The Early Beatles, which contains 11 of the 14 tracks that had previously been issued on Introducing... The Beatles. "Misery" and "There's a Place", two of the other three songs, would not make their Capitol Records LP debut until 1980, on the US version of Rarities. The other Introducing... song was "I Saw Her Standing There", first released in the UK on the Please Please Me LP. The song appeared in the US on both the Vee-Jay album as well as Capitol's Meet The Beatles! LP. These two albums marked the only time that two different Beatles' albums, each from a different record label, were released in the same month with one song appearing on both albums. There is a difference between the two tracks in that Paul's count-off is cut short on the Vee-Jay release by three numbers leaving only "four!" on the intro. Later, in the summer of 1964, Capitol would release Something New in the United States with five songs that had already appeared on the American A Hard Day's Night soundtrack album released by United Artists Records about one month earlier.

Introducing... The Beatles has never been officially released on compact disc, although several unauthorized CD reproductions have circulated in both mono and stereo versions, mostly with the version two line-up (with "Please Please Me" and "Ask Me Why").

== Counterfeits ==
A counterfeit Introducing... The Beatles label with the group's name and album title separated by the centre spindle hole

Starting in the late 1960s and continuing through the 1990s, Introducing... The Beatles was frequently counterfeited. These counterfeits can be identified by the cover printing and quality, the label, or the sound quality.

Counterfeits have some significant differences from the commercial issue. Some of the more common variations include:

- Labels with the title of the album and the group's name separated by the center spindle hole (as shown in the photo to the right)
- Labels with color bands that are off-center and/or missing the color green (as shown in the photo to the right)
- Labels with large white "brackets" (no color band)
- Album covers with dark brown borders
- Dating from the late 1970s, George Harrison's shadow is not visible on the right side of the cover. (However, all legitimate copies of the album and even most counterfeits include his shadow.)
- Hype stickers that read "Featuring Twist and Shout" and "P.S. I Love You" (Legitimate hype stickers show "Twist and Shout" and "Please, Please Me")

Nearly all fakes claim to be in stereo (though the actual sound of the record is often in mono). As legitimate stereo copies of Introducing... The Beatles are rare, the majority of copies with "stereo" or "stereophonic" printed on the cover are counterfeits.

There are also known fake versions of Songs, Pictures, and Stories of the Fabulous Beatles. These counterfeits often omit "Stories" from the album title, since they are circulated without the gatefold cover and the text inside, renaming it Songs and Pictures of the Fabulous Beatles. These versions have three songs not on the original album. "From Me To You" (in place of "Anna"), "Love Me Do" (in place of "Ask Me Why") and "P.S I Love You", which opens side 2 rather than "Please Please Me" (The song is rather placed on side 1, track 3).

== Track listing ==
=== Version one ===
All tracks are written by Lennon–McCartney, except where noted.

Side one
| No. | Title | Lead vocals | Length |
|---|---|---|---|
| 1. | "I Saw Her Standing There (Note: McCartney counting "one, two, three" is omitted; recording starts with "four")" | McCartney | 2:50 |
| 2. | "Misery" | Lennon with McCartney | 1:48 |
| 3. | "Anna (Go to Him)" (Arthur Alexander) | Lennon | 3:00 |
| 4. | "Chains" (Gerry Goffin, Carole King) | Harrison | 2:25 |
| 5. | "Boys" (Luther Dixon, Wes Farrell) | Starr | 2:28 |
| 6. | "Love Me Do" | McCartney with Lennon | 2:19 |
| Total length: | | | 14:50 |

Side two
| No. | Title | Writer(s) | Lead vocals | Length |
|---|---|---|---|---|
| 1. | "P.S. I Love You" | | McCartney | 2:04 |
| 2. | "Baby It's You" (Burt Bacharach, Mack David, Luther Dixon alias Barney Williams) | | Lennon | 2:41 |
| 3. | "Do You Want to Know a Secret" | | Harrison | 1:59 |
| 4. | "A Taste of Honey" | Ric Marlow, Bobby Scott | McCartney | 2:05 |
| 5. | "There's a Place" | | Lennon and McCartney | 1:53 |
| 6. | "Twist and Shout" (Phil Medley, Bert Russell) | | Lennon | 2:33 |
| Total length: | | | | 13:15 |

=== Version two ===
All tracks are written by Lennon–McCartney, except where noted.

Side one
| No. | Title | Lead vocals | Length |
|---|---|---|---|
| 1. | "I Saw Her Standing There" | McCartney | 2:50 |
| 2. | "Misery" | Lennon with McCartney | 1:48 |
| 3. | "Anna (Go to Him)" (Arthur Alexander) | Lennon | 3:00 |
| 4. | "Chains" (Gerry Goffin, Carole King) | Harrison | 2:25 |
| 5. | "Boys" (Luther Dixon, Wes Farrell) | Starr | 2:28 |
| 6. | "Ask Me Why" | Lennon | 2:24 |
| Total length: | | | 14:55 |

Side two
| No. | Title | Lead vocals | Length |
|---|---|---|---|
| 1. | "Please Please Me" | Lennon with McCartney | 2:00 |
| 2. | "Baby It's You" (Burt Bacharach, Mack David, Barney Williams) | Lennon | 2:41 |
| 3. | "Do You Want to Know a Secret" | Harrison | 1:59 |
| 4. | "A Taste of Honey" (Ric Marlow, Bobby Scott) | McCartney | 2:05 |
| 5. | "There's a Place" | Lennon and McCartney | 1:53 |
| 6. | "Twist and Shout" (Phil Medley, Bert Russell) | Lennon | 2:33 |
| Total length: | | | 13:11 |

== Personnel ==
Personnel per MacDonald

The Beatles

- John Lennon – rhythm guitar, harmonica, vocals
- Paul McCartney – bass guitar, vocals
- George Harrison – lead guitar, backing vocals, lead vocals on "Chains" and "Do You Want to Know a Secret"
- Ringo Starr – drums, lead vocals on "Boys", tambourine on "Love Me Do", maracas on "P.S. I Love You"

Additional and production

- Andy White – drums on "Love Me Do" and "P.S. I Love You"
- George Martin – producer, piano on "Misery", celesta on "Baby It's You"

== Charts and certifications ==
=== Chart performance ===
| Chart (1964) | Peak position |
|---|---|
| US Billboard Top LPs | 2 |

=== Certifications ===
| Region | Certification | Certified units/sales |
|---|---|---|
| United States (RIAA) | Platinum | 1,000,000^{^} |
^{^} Shipments figures based on certification alone.

== See also ==
- Outline of the Beatles
- The Beatles timeline

== Notes ==
- Whitburn, Joel (2010), Joel Whitburn Presents Top Pop Albums, Seventh Edition, Record Research Inc., ISBN 978-0-89820-183-3
