= List of number-one singles in 1964 (New Zealand) =

This is a list of Number 1 hit singles in 1964 in New Zealand from the Lever Hit Parade.

== Chart ==
Week	Artist	Title
2 January 1964	The Beatles	"I Want to Hold Your Hand"
9 January 1964	The Beatles	"I Want to Hold Your Hand"
16 January 1964	The Beatles	"I Want to Hold Your Hand"
23 January 1964	The Impressions	"It's All Right"
30 January 1964	The Impressions	"It's All Right"
6 February 1964	Bobby Vinton	"There! I've Said It Again"
13 February 1964	The Beatles	"I Saw Her Standing There"
20 February 1964	The Dave Clark Five	"Glad All Over"
27 February 1964	The Dave Clark Five	"Glad All Over"
5 March 1964	The Dave Clark Five	"Glad All Over"
12 March 1964	The Beatles	"I Saw Her Standing There"
19 March 1964	The Beatles	"I Saw Her Standing There"
26 March 1964	The Searchers	"Needles And Pins"
2 April 1964	The Searchers	"Needles And Pins"
9 April 1964	Dionne Warwick	"Anyone Who Had a Heart"
16 April 1964	Cilla Black	"Anyone Who Had a Heart"
23 April 1964	The Beatles	"Twist & Shout"
30 April 1964	Billy J Kramer	"Little Children"
7 May 1964	Billy J Kramer	"Little Children"
14 May 1964	The Beatles	"Can't Buy Me Love"
21 May 1964	The Bachelors	"I Believe"
28 May 1964	Peter and Gordon	"A World Without Love"
4 June 1964	The Beatles	"Love Me Do"
11 June 1964	The Searchers	"Don't Throw Your Love Away"
18 June 1964	The Searchers	"Don't Throw Your Love Away"
25 June 1964	Mary Wells	"My Guy"
2 July 1964	Louis Armstrong	"Hello, Dolly!"
9 July 1964	Louis Armstrong	"Hello, Dolly!"
16 July 1964	Louis Armstrong	"Hello, Dolly!"
23 July 1964	Roy Orbison	"It's Over"
30 July 1964	The Four Pennies	"Juliet"
6 August 1964	The Dixie Cups	"Chapel Of Love"
13 August 1964	The Dixie Cups	"Chapel Of Love"
20 August 1964	The Beatles	"A Hard Day's Night"
27 August 1964	Dean Martin	"Everybody Loves Somebody"
3 September 1964	The Beatles	"A Hard Day's Night"
10 September 1964	The Beatles	"A Hard Day's Night"
17 September 1964	The Supremes	"Where Did Our Love Go"
24 September 1964	Manfred Mann	"Do Wah Diddy Diddy"
1 October 1964	The Honeycombs	"Have I the Right?"
8 October 1964	The Honeycombs	"Have I the Right?"
15 October 1964	The Honeycombs	"Have I the Right?"
22 October 1964	Roy Orbison	"Oh Pretty Woman"
29 October 1964	Roy Orbison	"Oh Pretty Woman"
5 November 1964	Gale Garnett	"We'll Sing in the Sunshine"
12 November 1964	Herman's Hermits	"I'm into Something Good"
19 November 1964	J. Frank Wilson and the Cavaliers	"Last Kiss"
26 November 1964	Sandie Shaw	"(There's) Always Something There to Remind Me"
3 December 1964	The Shangri-Las	"Leader of the Pack"
10 December 1964	The Supremes	"Baby Love"
17 December 1964	The Rolling Stones	"Little Red Rooster"
24 December 1964	The Beatles	"I Feel Fine"
31 December 1964	The Zombies	"She's Not There"
