= There's a Place =

1963 song by the Beatles

- B-side label of US single "Twist and Shout"

Song by the Beatles

from the album Please Please Me
- Released: 22 March 1963
- Recorded: 11 February 1963
- Studio: EMI, London
- Genre: Pop; beat; rock and roll
- Length: 1:49
- Label: Parlophone
- Songwriter: McCartney–Lennon
- Producer: George Martin

The Beatles US chronology
| "Please Please Me" (1964) | "Twist and Shout" / "There's a Place" (1964) | "Can't Buy Me Love" (1964) |

"There's a Place" is a song by the English rock band the Beatles from their debut album, Please Please Me, released in March 1963. It was written primarily by John Lennon and credited to McCartney–Lennon. In the United States, the song was released in July 1963 on the group's first US LP, Introducing... The Beatles, later reissued in January 1964 as Beatlemania surged there. It was also issued as a non-album single in the US, in March 1964, as the B-side to "Twist and Shout", reaching number 74 in the Billboard Hot 100.

Lennon said that "There's a Place" was his attempt at writing a song in the Motown style. According to Paul McCartney, the song's title phrase originated from "There's a Place for Us", from the soundtrack album to the 1961 film West Side Story. The song's lyrics relate to the singer's ability to overcome his loneliness by retreating into the haven of his mind.

"There's a Place" has received a favourable response from several music critics. Some reviewers admire its harmonies and recognise the lyrics as exhibiting a depth not found in contemporaneous pop songs.

== Background ==
"There's a Place" was my attempt at a sort of Motown, black thing. It says the usual Lennon things: "In my mind there's no sorrow ..." It's all in your mind.

— John Lennon, 1980

Among Beatles biographers and historians, Mark Lewisohn, Walter Everett, Tim Riley and Mark Hertsgaard credit John Lennon as the main writer of "There's a Place". In a 1971 interview, Lennon identifies the song as having been written by himself. He recalled in 1980 that he was attempting to write a "Motown, black thing", with the lyrics saying "the usual Lennon things". Music critic Ian MacDonald speculates that he was referring to the Isley Brothers, but comments that this influence is not readily apparent on the final recording. Everett also does not consider the song to be especially Motown-influenced, but draws a comparison between soul singer Arthur Alexander and the Marvelettes' 1961 version of "I Want a Guy".

In his 1997 authorised biography, Many Years from Now, Paul McCartney instead recalls co-writing the song with Lennon in the front room of his childhood home, 20 Forthlin Road, "but with a bias towards being [his] original idea". Explaining that he owned a copy of the soundtrack album to the 1961 film West Side Story, composed by Leonard Bernstein and Stephen Sondheim, McCartney says that he drew the phrase "There's a Place" from the soundtrack's song "There's a Place for Us". The songs diverged in that while "There's a Place for Us" refers to a place "round the back of the stairs for a kiss and a cuddle", the Beatles' song refers to "the mind".

== Composition ==
"There's a Place" is in the key of E major and in 4/4 time. Unusually short for the Beatles, the song features only one bridge. Everett writes that it borrows aspects from the band's earlier songs. For example, he writes it takes "two-bar groupings that embellish I with an alternating IV" from the chorus of "Love Me Do" and adds it to the song's first verse. From "Please Please Me", it uses the same octave spanning lines of George Harrison on guitar and Lennon on harmonica. The song's opening bass note, hitting a natural B, is "nearly identical" to that of "Please Please Me". Like many of the band's early singles, the song features a harmonica, playing with the vocals of the bridge like is heard on "Ask Me Why". (Note: One or both sides of the Beatles' first four UK singles feature a harmonica, including: "Love Me Do", "Please Please Me", "From Me To You", "Thank You Girl" and "I'll Get You".)

We both sang it. I took the high harmony, John took the lower harmony or melody. This was a nice thing because we didn't actually have to decide where the melody was till later when they boringly had to write it down for sheet music.

— Paul McCartney, 1997

Lennon and McCartney sing the song as a two-part harmony in fourths and fifths, with Lennon singing the low part and McCartney the high. McCartney's high vocal stops at the end of the first and third verses, leaving Lennon momentarily alone on lead vocal, adding what musicologist Alan W. Pollack calls "trill-like ornaments". George Harrison provides a backing vocal, singing with McCartney while Lennon sings the lead during the variant verse following the first verse.

The song's lyrics are written in the form of a first-person narrative. The singer declares his self-sufficiency, being able to transcend loneliness by retreating into his mind. Rather than having different verses, the lyrics repeat the verse line, serving to emphasise the song's theme. Pollack describes the song as "paradoxically quite tense", with the confident message of the lyrics playing against the "hard-hitting, unique sonority of the E-Major seventh chord". Everett similarly describes the song as "an unusual mix of happiness and melancholia". Riley writes that its fadeout provides a liberating effect through its major key, suggesting the singer has achieved respite, though the "rhythmic tension" hints at "an uneasiness below the surface that remains unresolved".

== Recording ==
"There's a Place"
The characteristic bounce from McCartney's bass and Lennon's rhythm guitar is not present on early takes of the song, being added while working in the studio.

The Beatles recorded most of their debut LP Please Please Me on 11 February 1963, split across three sessions in twelve hours and forty-five minutes. Recorded in EMI's Studio Two, George Martin produced, supported by balance engineer Norman Smith. Throughout the sessions, Lennon and McCartney are heard sniffling and coughing, with Lennon faring a heavy cold. The band began with ten takes of "There's a Place", reworking the rhythm and bass guitar parts between attempts. After their lunch break, Lennon finished the song by overdubbing a harmonica onto take ten. His three attempts, two complete and one a false start, were marked as takes eleven through thirteen, with take thirteen marked "best".

On 25 February, Martin, again assisted by Smith, returned to EMI to edit and mix the album in Studio One. They mixed "There's a Place" for mono and stereo from take thirteen, adding heavy reverberation to Lennon's harmonica overdub. As was typical for the time, none of the Beatles were present for mixing.

== Release and reception ==
EMI's Parlophone label released Please Please Me in the UK on 22 March 1963, with "There's a Place" sequenced as the penultimate track, between "A Taste of Honey" and "Twist and Shout". The song is credited to McCartney–Lennon, since the Lennon–McCartney designation was not used until August that year. In a contemporary review of the album for the Record Mirror, Norman Jopling describes the song as "wistful" with "a definite beat on the backing." He concludes it is "a typical number ... [n]ot a standout track but one with plenty of appeal." Vee-Jay released the first US Beatles album, Introducing... The Beatles, on 22 July 1963, with "There's a Place" sequenced as the twelfth track between "A Taste of Honey" and "Twist and Shout". The initial US release attracted little attention, Beatlemania not reaching America until December 1963. As the Beatles' popularity surged, record labels rushed to re-release material, with Vee-Jay reissuing the album on 27 January 1964. (Note: The reissue includes an altered track listing, although the sequencing of "There's a Place" remains the same.) Tollie released "There's a Place" in the US as the B-side to "Twist and Shout" on 2 March 1964. (Note: Lewisohn, Everett and Kenneth Womack provide the 2 March 1964 release date. John C. Winn, however, writes it was 20 February 1964.) "Twist and Shout" peaked at number two on the US Billboard Hot 100 in April 1964, while "There's a Place" made it on the chart for one week, reaching number 74.

Author Greil Marcus writes that "There's a Place" is "incandescent", with an arrangement built around drumming from Ringo Starr that "could take your breath away". He asserts that its musical qualities and lyricism provided a template for the success of the Beatles' later music. Howard Kramer of the Rock and Roll Hall of Fame writes that the song illustrates the band's earliest influences, joining Everly Brothers-style harmonies with Brill Building-type songwriting. Hertsgaard recognises "There's a Place" and "Misery" as the two "sleeping beauties" of Please Please Me that are often overlooked. Riley offers similar sentiments, writing that the song exhibits more maturity than "teenybopper" tracks like "Ask Me Why" or "Do You Want to Know a Secret". Hertsgaard, Chris Ingham and Ian Marshall each write that the song's lyrics are deeper than those of the album's other tracks and that they anticipate the more introspective compositions of the later Beatles, especially Lennon. Kevin Howlett and Lewisohn write the song shows Lennon's "early fascination with self-discovery and the fulfilment such knowledge can bring". Hertsgaard contends that the song's "free-thinking sensibility" was later expanded upon in Lennon's 1966 songs "I'm Only Sleeping" and "Tomorrow Never Knows". In his 2007 book Can't Buy Me Love, Jonathan Gould dismisses the track as an awkward rewrite of "Please Please Me". He views the lyrics as "dreadful" and says that those who see the song as anticipating the later introspection of the Beatles' lyrics are being overly generous.

Several writers have compared "There's a Place" to the Beach Boys' 1963 song "In My Room". Riley considers the Beatles' song "much better", as do critics Robert Christgau and John Piccarella, who say that "Lennon has better places to go but his room, and better ways to get there than Brian Wilson." Comparing the Beatles' harmonies to the Beach Boys', Riley writes that Lennon and McCartney "[double] the effect" of any similar attempt by the Beach Boys. Hertsgaard similarly praises the vocals, calling the harmonies in the song's opening "sublime". Less impressed, Ian MacDonald says that the two-part harmony shows "that Lennon had a heavy cold", although he adds that Lennon and McCartney's passionate singing "cuts through".

== Personnel ==
According to Ian MacDonald:

- John Lennon – vocal, harmonica, rhythm guitar
- Paul McCartney – vocal, bass
- George Harrison – backing vocal, lead guitar
- Ringo Starr – drums

== Chart performance ==
=== Weekly charts ===
1964 weekly chart performance
| Chart (1964) | Peak position |
|---|---|
| US Billboard Hot 100 | 74 |
