= P.S. I Love You (Beatles song) =

1962 single by The Beatles

- US picture sleeve

Single by the Beatles

from the album Please Please Me
- A-side: "Love Me Do"
- Released: 5 October 1962 (UK); 27 April 1964 (US)
- Recorded: 11 September 1962
- Studio: EMI, London
- Genre: Merseybeat; pop
- Length: 2:04
- Label: Parlophone (UK); Tollie (US)
- Songwriter: Lennon–McCartney
- Producer: George Martin

The Beatles UK singles chronology
"Love Me Do" / "P.S. I Love You" (1962)	"Please Please Me" (1963)

The Beatles US singles chronology
"Do You Want to Know a Secret" (1964)	"Love Me Do" / "P.S. I Love You" (1964)	"A Hard Day's Night" (1964)

"P.S. I Love You" is a song recorded by English rock band the Beatles in 1962. It was composed principally by Paul McCartney (credited to Lennon–McCartney), and produced by Ron Richards. The song was released in the UK on 5 October 1962 as the B-side of their debut single "Love Me Do" and is also included on their debut album Please Please Me (1963). It was later included on the American album Introducing... The Beatles (1964) released by Vee-Jay Records. After Vee-Jay's licence to distribute the Beatles' recordings expired, Capitol Records included it on The Early Beatles (1965). Capitol also included it on the Beatles compilation album Love Songs (1977).

== Recording ==
The version featured on the single and album was recorded in ten takes on 11 September 1962 at EMI's Abbey Road Studios, London. Producer George Martin had booked session drummer Andy White as a replacement for Pete Best, whom he considered not technically good enough for recording purposes; Martin had been unaware that the other Beatles had already replaced Pete Best with Ringo Starr, who attended the session and plays maracas on the song. White was a freelance show band and session drummer, and gave the recording a lightweight cha cha treatment.

Martin was not present at the session and it was run by Ron Richards. Richards told the group that the song could not be the A-side of their single because of an earlier song with the same title: "I was originally a music publishing man, a plugger, so I knew someone had done a record with that title. I said to Paul, 'You can have it as B-side, but not an A-side.'"

With Starr playing drums, the Beatles recorded the song at the BBC on 25 October 1962, 27 November 1962 and 17 June 1963 for subsequent broadcast on the BBC radio programmes Here We Go, Talent Spot and Pop Go the Beatles, respectively. The 17 June 1963 recording was officially published on the On Air – Live at the BBC Volume 2 album (2013).

== Composition ==
Written in spring 1962, while Paul McCartney was in Hamburg, this song is sometimes considered to be a dedication to his then-girlfriend Dot Rhone. However, McCartney denies this:

It's just an idea for a song really, a theme song based on a letter, like the Paperback Writer idea. It was pretty much mine. I don't think John had much of a hand in it. There are certain themes that are easier than others to hang a song on, and a letter is one of them... The letter is a popular theme and it's just my attempt at one of those. It's not based in reality, nor did I write it to my girlfriend from Hamburg, which some people think.

John Lennon commented:

That's Paul's song. He was trying to write a "Soldier Boy" like the Shirelles. He wrote that in Germany, or when we were going to and from Hamburg. I might have contributed something. I can't remember anything in particular. It was mainly his song.

Melodically typical of McCartney's later writing style, the song demonstrates two notable exceptions to the contemporaneous model: during the opening chorus the chord D♭7 is placed incongruously between G and D (on write), and during the song's title phrase a sudden shift to B♭ occurs underneath "P.S. I love you" which Ian MacDonald described as "a dark sidestep". Lennon contributes a single note harmony emphasising the beginning of each stanza. Lyrically constructed with their female audience in mind, the Beatles included it as part of their Cavern Club song set.

== Releases ==
On 1 January 2013, recordings of "P.S. I Love You" published in 1962 entered the public domain in Europe.

On its 20th anniversary, Parlophone re-issued "P.S. I Love You" as a picture disc, and shortly afterwards as a 12-inch disc.

== Personnel ==
- Paul McCartney – lead vocals, bass
- John Lennon – acoustic guitar, backing vocals
- George Harrison – acoustic guitar, backing vocals
- Ringo Starr – maracas
- Andy White – drums

Engineered by Norman Smith

Personnel per Ian MacDonald except where noted

For the Beatles' BBC session recorded 17 June 1963 and released on the album On Air – Live at the BBC Volume 2 (2013), Starr plays drums.

== Charts ==
=== Weekly charts ===
Weekly chart performance for "P.S. I Love You"
Chart (1962–64)	Peak position
Italy (Musica e Dischi)	14
US Billboard Hot 100	10

=== Year-end charts ===
Year-end chart performance for "P.S. I Love You"
Chart (1964)	Rank
U.S. (Joel Whitburn's Pop Annual)	107
