= Anna (Go to Him) =

1962 song by Arthur Alexander

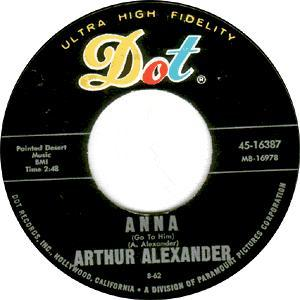

Single by Arthur Alexander
- B-side: "I Hang My Head and Cry"
- Released: September 17, 1962
- Recorded: May 1962
- Genre: Soul
- Length: 2:48
- Label: Dot
- Songwriter: Arthur Alexander
- Producer: Noel Ball

Arthur Alexander singles chronology
"Soldier of Love (Lay Down Your Arms)" (1962)	"Anna (Go to Him)" (1962)	"Go Home Girl" (1962)

"Anna (Go to Him)", or simply "Anna", is a song written and originally recorded by Arthur Alexander. His version was released as a single by Dot Records on September 17, 1962. A cover version was performed by the Beatles and included on their 1963 debut album Please Please Me. A Spanish-language cover version was performed by Grupo Pegasso and included on their 1984 album Amor Vendido, Vol. 4, followed by a re-recorded version as well as an English version in 2019.

== Background and lyrics ==
Alexander based the song's lyrics on the early days of his relationship with his girlfriend (and later wife) Ann, and how her former boyfriend, who hailed from a wealthy family, attempted to win her back. Alexander's biographer, Richard Younger, notes that, "Though it was surely Arthur who had been unfaithful in his marriage vows, in the song he puts himself in the role of the abandoned lover." According to Younger, Alexander stated that, though his wife had indeed not been unfaithful to him, he believed that she had begun to regret not taking back her former boyfriend, who had since "moved on". Alexander's marriage to Ann would ultimately end in divorce.

Despite the song's title, throughout the song the lyric is "go with him" rather than "go to him". Regarding the additional syllable added to Ann's name in the song, Alexander said, "it just fit better than Ann."

== Release and reception ==
According to Richie Unterberger, music critic for AllMusic:

"Anna" was one of the great early soul ballads, even if its loping groove was closer to a mid-tempo song than a slow ballad. Like several of Alexander's songs, it would come to be more famous in its cover version than through its original release. And it was actually a small hit when it first came out in 1962, getting to #68 in the pop charts and #10 in the R&B listings.

Critic Dave Marsh rates Alexander's "Anna (Go to Him)" as one of the top 1001 singles of all time. He praises the "gently swinging rhythm," the tough, syncopated drumming (by Nashville drummer Kenny Buttrey), and Alexander's vocal, particularly at the beginning of the refrain, suggesting that Beatles member John Lennon may have learned to sing ballads like "In My Life" by listening to Alexander's performance.

The song plays a prominent role in the Married... with Children episode "Oldies But Young 'Uns". In the episode, the song becomes an earworm for Al Bundy, who desperately wants to know the title.

== The Beatles' version ==
"Anna (Go to Him)"
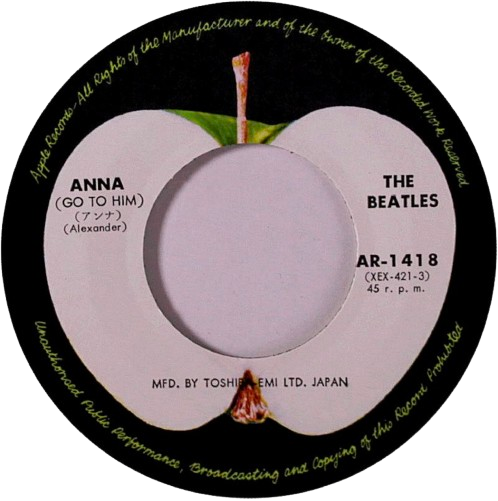
- B-side label from the 1969 Japanese single, with "Dizzy, Miss Lizzy" as the A-side

Song by the Beatles

from the album Please Please Me
- Released: March 22, 1963
- Recorded: February 11, 1963
- Studio: EMI, London
- Genre: R&B
- Length: 2:54
- Label: Parlophone
- Songwriter: Arthur Alexander
- Producer: George Martin

A personal favorite of John Lennon, it became part of the Beatles' early repertoire and was consequently recorded by them for their 1963 debut album, Please Please Me.

In the U.S., Vee Jay Records released it on Introducing... The Beatles (January 10, 1964) and Capitol Records re-released it on The Early Beatles (March 22, 1965). Vee Jay also released "Anna (Go to Him)" on the EP Souvenir of Their Visit: The Beatles in the US.

=== Recording ===
The band recorded the song on February 11, 1963, in three takes; Take 3 was the master. It was remixed on February 25. George Harrison played the distinctive phrase on guitar; Floyd Cramer played it on piano for the original.

They recorded "Anna (Go to Him)" on June 17, 1963, for the BBC radio show Pop Go the Beatles. The show was broadcast on June 25.

=== Reception ===
Unterberger praised the Beatles' version in his review:

Ringo Starr faithfully [replicates] the unusual drum rhythm and hi-hat crunches. Lennon's vocal, however, added a tortured pain not present in Alexander's model, particularly when he wailed in his upper register at the conclusion of the bridges. The Beatles' backup harmony vocals, in addition, were superb, and more effective [than on Alexander's version].

Music critic Ian MacDonald had a different view of Lennon's vocal delivery, saying it sounded like "a passionate youth grappling with a man's song". As noted in many references including Mark Lewisohn's The Beatles Recording Sessions, Lennon had a bad cold on the day of recording which had an adverse effect on his voice.

=== Personnel ===
From Ian MacDonald:

- John Lennon – vocals, acoustic rhythm guitar
- Paul McCartney – bass, backing vocals
- George Harrison – lead guitar, backing vocals
- Ringo Starr – drums

Engineered by Norman Smith

== Bibliography ==
- Younger, Richard (2000). Get a Shot of Rhythm and Blues: The Arthur Alexander Story. University of Alabama Press. ISBN 978-0817310240.
