= Love Me Do =

1962 single by the Beatles

- US picture sleeve

Single by the Beatles

from the album Please Please Me
- B-side: "P.S. I Love You"
- Released: 5 October 1962 (UK); 27 April 1964 (US)
- Recorded: 4 September 1962 (UK single version); 11 September 1962 (album/US single version)
- Studio: EMI, London
- Genre: Merseybeat; pop; rock and roll
- Length: 2:22
- Label: Parlophone (UK); Tollie (US)
- Songwriter: Lennon–McCartney
- Producer: George Martin

The Beatles UK singles chronology
"My Bonnie" (1962)	"Love Me Do" (1962)	"Please Please Me" (1963)

The Beatles US singles chronology
"Do You Want to Know a Secret" (1964)	"Love Me Do" (1964)	"Sie liebt dich" (1964)

"Love Me Do" is the debut single by the English rock band the Beatles, backed by "P.S. I Love You". When the single was originally released in the United Kingdom on 5 October 1962, it peaked at number 17. It was released in the United States in 1964 and topped the nation's song chart. Re-released in 1982 as part of EMI's Beatles 20th anniversary, it re-entered the UK charts and peaked at number 4. "Love Me Do" also topped the charts in Australia and New Zealand.

The song was written several years before being recorded, and prior to the existence of the Beatles. It features John Lennon's prominent harmonica playing and duet vocals by him and Paul McCartney. Three recorded versions of the song by the Beatles have been released, each with a different drummer. The first attempted recording from June 1962 featured Pete Best on drums, but was not officially released until the Anthology 1 compilation in 1995. A second version was recorded three months later with Best's replacement Ringo Starr, and this was used for the original Parlophone single first pressing. A third version, featuring session drummer Andy White in place of Starr, was used for the second pressing and also included on the band's Please Please Me album and on the 1964 Tollie single in the US. It was also included on the American LPs Introducing... The Beatles and The Early Beatles.

== Composition ==
"Love Me Do" was written by John Lennon and Paul McCartney, with McCartney writing the verse and chorus and Lennon contributing the middle eight (or "bridge"). Lennon said: "'Love Me Do' is Paul's song – ... I do know he had the song around, in Hamburg, even, way, way before we were songwriters."

McCartney said:

"Love Me Do" was completely co-written ... It was just Lennon and McCartney sitting down without either of us having a particularly original idea. We loved doing it, it was a very interesting thing to try and learn to do, to become songwriters. I think why we eventually got so strong was we wrote so much through our formative period. "Love Me Do" was our first hit, which ironically is one of the two songs that we control, because when we first signed to EMI they had a music publishing company called Ardmore and Beechwood which took the two songs, "Love Me Do" and "P.S. I Love You", and in doing a deal somewhere along the way we were able to get them back.

Their practice at the time was to scribble songs in a school notebook, dreaming of stardom, always writing "Another Lennon–McCartney Original" at the top of the page. "Love Me Do" is a song based around three simple chords: G7 and C, before moving to D for its middle eight. It begins with Lennon playing a bluesy dry "dockside harmonica" riff, then features Lennon and McCartney on joint lead vocals, including Everly Brothers-style harmonising during the beseeching "please" before McCartney sings the unaccompanied vocal line on the song's title phrase.

Lennon had previously sung the title sections, but this change in arrangement was made in the studio under the direction of producer George Martin when he realised that the harmonica part encroached on the vocal. Lennon needed to begin playing the harmonica again on the same beat as the "do" of "love me do". However, when a similar situation later occurred on the "Please Please Me" single session, the harmonica was superimposed afterwards using tape-to-tape overdubbing.

Described by Ian MacDonald as "standing out like a bare brick wall in a suburban sitting-room, 'Love Me Do', [with its] blunt working class northerness, rang the first faint chime of a revolutionary bell" compared to the standard Tin Pan Alley productions occupying the charts at the time.

== Recordings and releases ==
"Love Me Do" was recorded by the Beatles on three occasions, each with a different drummer, at EMI Studios at 3 Abbey Road in London:

- The Beatles' first recording session, on 6 June 1962, with Pete Best on drums. This version (previously thought to be lost) is available on Anthology 1.
- Second recording session, 4 September 1962. In August, Best had been replaced with Ringo Starr, after producer George Martin did not approve of Best's drumming for studio work. The Beatles with Starr recorded a version in 15 takes. This version with Starr is available on Past Masters, as well as on the 2023 expanded edition of the compilation album 1962–1966 and the flip side of the "Now and Then" single.
- Third recording session, 11 September 1962. A week later, The Beatles recorded "Love Me Do" with session drummer Andy White on drums. Starr was relegated to playing tambourine. As tambourine is not present on 4 September recording, this is the easiest way to distinguish between the Starr and White recordings. The Andy White version is available on Please Please Me.

First issues of the single, released on Parlophone in the UK on 5 October 1962, featured the Ringo Starr version, prompting Mark Lewisohn to later write: "Clearly, the 11 September version was not regarded as having been a significant improvement after all".

The Andy White version of the track was included on the Beatles' debut UK album, Please Please Me, The Beatles' Hits EP, and subsequent album releases on which "Love Me Do" was included (except as noted below), as well as on the first US single release in April 1964. For the 1976 single re-issue and the 1982 "20th Anniversary" re-issue, as well as various compilation albums including the original release of 1962–1966 and 1, the Andy White version was again used. The Ringo Starr version was included on the albums Rarities (US version), Past Masters and Mono Masters. It was also included on Record 1 of From Liverpool The Beatles Box (1980 8LP). The CD single issued on 2 October 1992 contains both versions. The Pete Best version remained unreleased until 1995, when it was included on the Anthology 1 album.

Capitol Records Canada pressed 170 singles which were released on 4 February 1963 with catalogue number 72076. This pressing was dubbed from the original UK single and featured Starr on drums.

"Love Me Do", featuring Starr drumming, was also recorded eight times at the BBC and played on the BBC Radio programmes Here We Go, Talent Spot, Saturday Club, Side by Side, Pop Go the Beatles and Easy Beat between October 1962 and October 1963. The version of "Love Me Do" recorded on 10 July 1963 at the BBC and broadcast on 23 July 1963 Pop Go the Beatles programme can be heard on the group's Live at the BBC compilation. The Beatles also performed the song live on 20 February 1963 Parade of the Pops BBC Radio broadcast.

In 1969, during the Get Back sessions, The Beatles played the song in a slower, more bluesy form than they had in earlier recordings. This version of "Love Me Do" is one of many recordings made during these sessions and subsequently appeared on some bootlegs. The song featured no harmonica by Lennon, and McCartney sang the majority of the song in the same vocal style he used for "Lady Madonna".

In 1989, McCartney blended the two songs from the Beatles' first single into a medley called "P.S. Love Me Do" for some dates of his 1989/90 World Tour. A little-known studio version of the medley first became available on a Special Package (1990 Japanese tour edition) of his solo album Flowers in the Dirt. The song became more widely known when a live version was released as a bonus track on the 12-inch single and CD single of "Birthday" from the double live album Tripping the Live Fantastic. Music videos for both "Birthday" and "P.S. Love Me Do" were released.

On 1 January 2013, recordings of "Love Me Do" published in 1962 entered the public domain in Europe.

The original 1962 single version of the song, with Ringo Starr on drums, received a new stereo mix by Giles Martin with the help of de-mixing technology developed by Peter Jackson's WingNut Films and was released on 2 November 2023 as the flip side on the double A-side single of "Now and Then", finally making number one in the UK. It was also included in the expanded edition of the 1962–1966 compilation released on 10 November 2023.

== Background ==
=== First recording session and use of harmonica ===
The Beatles' first recording session under contract to EMI was on 6 June 1962. They first attempted "Love Me Do", as well as three other songs, at this session. George Martin, originally absent from the session, arrived during the recording of "Love Me Do" and altered the arrangement so that McCartney sang the words "love me do" instead of Lennon, enabling Lennon to play the harmonica starting on the word "do". McCartney recalled:

George Martin said, "Wait a minute, there's a crossover there. Someone else has got to sing 'love me do' because you're going to have a song called Love Me Waahhh. So, Paul, will you sing 'love me do'?" God, I got the screaming heebie-jeebies. ... I can still hear the shake in my voice when I listen to it.

This version of "Love Me Do" also featured a change in drum rhythm during the middle-eight, moving to a skip beat that Beatles historian Mark Lewisohn deemed "disastrous". Both Martin and Ron Richards agreed that Pete Best's drumming was unsuitable for future recording.

On 4 September 1962, Brian Epstein paid for the Beatles—along with their new drummer, Ringo Starr—to fly down from Liverpool to London for their next session. After first checking into their Chelsea hotel, they arrived at EMI Studios early in the afternoon where they set up their equipment in Studio 3 and began rehearsing six songs including: "Please Please Me", "Love Me Do" and a song originally composed for Adam Faith by Mitch Murray titled "How Do You Do It?", which George Martin "was insisting, in the apparent absence of any stronger original material, would be the group's first single". Lennon and McCartney had yet to impress Martin with their songwriting ability, and the Beatles had been signed as recording artists on the basis of their charismatic appeal: "It wasn't a question of what they could do [as] they hadn't written anything great at that time." "But what impressed me most was their personalities. Sparks flew off them when you talked to them." During the course of an evening session that then followed (7:00 pm to 10:00 pm in Studio 2) they recorded "How Do You Do It" and "Love Me Do". An attempt at "Please Please Me" was made, but at this stage it was quite different from its eventual treatment and it was dropped by Martin. This disappointed the group, for they had hoped the song would be the B-side to "Love Me Do".

The Beatles were keen to record their own material, something which was almost unheard of at that time, and it is generally accepted as being to Martin's credit that they were allowed to float their own ideas. But Martin insisted that unless they could write something as commercial as "How Do You Do It?" then the Tin Pan Alley practice of having the group record songs by professional songwriters (which was standard procedure then, and is still common today) would be followed. MacDonald points out, however: "It's almost certainly true that there was no other producer on either side of the Atlantic then capable of handling the Beatles without damaging them—let alone of cultivating and catering to them with the gracious, open-minded adeptness for which George Martin is universally respected in the British pop industry." Martin rejects, however, the view that he was the "genius" behind the group: "I was purely an interpreter. The genius was theirs: no doubt about that."

It was on 4 September session that, according to McCartney, Martin suggested using a harmonica. However, Lennon's harmonica part was present on the Anthology 1 version of the song recorded during the 6 June audition with Pete Best on drums. Also, Martin's own recollection of this is different, saying: "I picked up on 'Love Me Do' because of the harmonica sound", adding: "I loved wailing harmonica—it reminded me of the records I used to issue of Sonny Terry and Brownie McGhee. I felt it had a definite appeal."

Lennon had learned to play a chromatic harmonica that his uncle George (late husband of his Aunt Mimi) had given to him as a child. But the instrument being used at this time was one stolen by Lennon from a music shop in Arnhem, the Netherlands, in 1960, as the Beatles first journeyed to Hamburg by road. Lennon would have had this with him at the EMI audition on 6 June as Bruce Channel's "Hey! Baby", with its harmonica intro, and a hit in the UK in March 1962, was one of the thirty-three songs the Beatles had prepared (although only four were recorded: "Bésame Mucho"; "Love Me Do"; "P.S. I Love You" and "Ask Me Why", of which only "Bésame Mucho" and "Love Me Do" survive and appear on Anthology 1). Brian Epstein had also booked the American Bruce Channel to top a NEMS Enterprises promotion at New Brighton's Tower Ballroom, in Wallasey on 21 June 1962, just a few weeks after "Hey! Baby" had charted, and placed the Beatles a prestigious second on the bill. Lennon was so impressed that night with Channel's harmonica player, Delbert McClinton, that he later approached him for advice on how to play the instrument. Lennon makes reference also to Frank Ifield's "I Remember You" and its harmonica intro, a huge number one hit in the UK July 1962, saying: "The gimmick was the harmonica. There was a terrible thing called "I Remember You", and we did those numbers; and we started using it on "Love Me Do" just for arrangements". The harmonica was to become a feature of the Beatles' early hits such as "Love Me Do", "Please Please Me" and "From Me to You" as well as various album tracks. Paul McCartney recalled, "John expected to be in jail one day and he'd be the guy who played the harmonica."

Martin came very close to issuing "How Do You Do It?" as the Beatles' first single (it would also re-appear as a contender for their second single) before settling instead on "Love Me Do", as a mastered version of it was made ready for release and which still exists in EMI's archives. Martin commented later: "I looked very hard at 'How Do You Do It?', but in the end I went with 'Love Me Do', it was quite a good record." McCartney would remark: "We knew that the peer pressure back in Liverpool would not allow us to do 'How Do You Do It'." Martin nearly issued the record, but was stymied by pressure from EMI's publishing arm, Ardmore & Beechwood, who requested that a Lennon–McCartney song be the Beatles' first A-side single. Additionally, "How Do You Do It" songwriter Mitch Murray disliked the Beatles' version of the song.

=== Remake and Andy White ===
Martin then decided that as "Love Me Do" was going to be the group's debut release it needed to be re-recorded with a different drummer as he was unhappy with the 4 September drum sound (Abbey Road's Ken Townsend also recalls McCartney being dissatisfied with Starr's timing, due probably to his being under-rehearsed; Starr had joined the group only two weeks before the 4 September session.) Record producers at that time were used to hearing the bass drum "lock in" with the bass guitar as opposed to the much looser R&B feel that was just beginning to emerge, and so professional show band drummers were often used for recordings.

Ron Richards, placed in charge of the 11 September re-recording session in George Martin's absence, booked Andy White whom he had used in the past. Starr was expecting to play, and was very disappointed to be dropped for only his second Beatles recording session: Richards remembers "He just sat there quietly in the control box next to me. Then I asked him to play maracas on 'P.S. I Love You'. Ringo is lovely—always easy going". Starr recalled:

On my first visit in September we just ran through some tracks for George Martin. We even did "Please Please Me". I remember that, because while we were recording it I was playing the bass drum with a maraca in one hand and a tambourine in the other. I think it's because of that that George Martin used Andy White, the "professional", when we went down a week later to record "Love Me Do". The guy was previously booked, anyway, because of Pete Best. George didn't want to take any more chances and I was caught in the middle. I was devastated that George Martin had his doubts about me. I came down ready to roll and heard, "We've got a professional drummer." He has apologised several times since, has old George, but it was devastating—I hated the bugger for years; I still don't let him off the hook!

Paul McCartney: "George got his way and Ringo didn't drum on the first single. He only played tambourine. I don't think Ringo ever got over that. He had to go back up to Liverpool and everyone asked, 'How did it go in the Smoke?' We'd say, 'B-side's good,' but Ringo couldn't admit to liking the A-side, not being on it" (from Anthology). "Love Me Do" was recorded with White playing drums and Starr on tambourine, but whether using a session drummer solved the problem is unclear, as session engineer Norman Smith was to comment: "It was a real headache trying to get a [good] drum sound, and when you listen to the record now you can hardly hear the drums at all." Ringo Starr's version was mixed "bottom-light" to hide Starr's bass drum.

Early pressings of the single (issued with a red Parlophone label) are the 4 September version—minus tambourine—with Starr playing drums. But later pressings of the single (on a black Parlophone label), and the version used for the Please Please Me album, are the 11 September re-record with Andy White on drums and Starr on tambourine. This difference has become fundamental in telling the two recordings of "Love Me Do" apart. Regarding the editing sessions that then followed all these various takes, Ron Richards remembers the whole thing being a bit fraught, saying: "Quite honestly, by the time it came out I was pretty sick of it. I didn't think it would do anything."

=== Ron Richards ===
There are major discrepancies regarding the White session, and who produced it. In his book Summer of Love, Martin concedes that his version of events differs from some accounts, saying: "On the 6 June Beatles session (audition) I decided that Pete Best had to go [and said to Epstein] I don't care what you do with Pete Best; but he's not playing on any more recording sessions: I'm getting a session drummer in." When Starr turned up with the group for their first proper recording session on 4 September, Martin says that he was totally unaware that the Beatles had fired Best; and, not knowing "how good, bad or indifferent" Starr was, was not prepared to "waste precious studio time finding out." Martin, therefore, appears to have this as the Andy White session in which Martin was present, and not 11 September. This contradicts Mark Lewisohn's account, as in his book The Complete Beatles Recording Sessions, he has Starr on drums on 4 September and White for the 11 September re-make. Lewisohn also says that Richards was in charge on 11 September, which means, if accurate, that Richards was sole producer of the White version of "Love Me Do". Martin says, "My diary shows that I did not oversee any Beatles recording sessions on 11 September—only the one on 4 September." But, if Lewisohn's account is correct and "the 4 September session really hadn't proved good enough to satisfy George Martin", it might seem odd that Martin was not then present to oversee the 11 September remake.

In his memoirs, assistant engineer Geoff Emerick supports the Lewisohn version, recounting that Starr played drums at the 4 September session (Emerick's second day at EMI) and that Martin, Smith, and McCartney were all dissatisfied with (the underrehearsed) Starr's timekeeping. Emerick places White firmly at the second session, and describes the reactions of Mal Evans and Starr to the substitution. Emerick also noted that Martin only came in very late for the 11 September session, after work on "Love Me Do" was complete.

Andy White confirms that he was booked by Ron Richards for the 11 September session, not by George Martin, who he says "could not make the session, could not get there till the end, so he had Ron Richards handle it". White also says that he recognises his own drumming on the released version of "Please Please Me", recorded that same session with him on drums.

== Chart performance ==
"Love Me Do" was released on 5 October 1962, and reached no. 17 in the UK charts in November, to the surprise of Martin, who doubted the song's commercial appeal. After the Beatles became famous, it was released in other countries. In Australia, it was released in 1964, and reached no. 1 on 14 February that year. It reached no. 1 in New Zealand on 4 June 1964. At first, US copies of "Love Me Do" were imported from Canada, which included Starr on drums. On 27 April 1964, Vee-Jay Records released the single on the Tollie label with White on drums.

The song was the fourth of six songs by the Beatles to hit the US number one spot in a one-year period; an all-time record for the US charts. In order, these were "I Want to Hold Your Hand", "She Loves You", "Can't Buy Me Love", "Love Me Do", "A Hard Day's Night", and "I Feel Fine". It was also the fourth of seven songs written by Lennon–McCartney to hit number one in 1964 (the other being "A World Without Love", recorded by Peter and Gordon).

=== Charts ===
Chart (1962–64)	Peak position
Australian (Kent Music Report)	1
Canada CHUM Chart	8
New Zealand (Lever Hit Parade)	1
UK Singles Chart	17
US Billboard Hot 100	1
US Cash Box Top 100	1

Chart (1982)	Peak position
Belgium (Ultratop 50 Flanders)	37
Ireland (IRMA)	4
Netherlands (Single Top 100)	32
UK Singles Chart	4

Chart (2012)	Peak position
Japan (Japan Hot 100)	48

== Certifications ==
Region	Certification	Certified units/sales
New Zealand (RMNZ)	Gold	15,000^{‡}
United Kingdom (BPI)	Gold	400,000^{‡}
United States (RIAA)	Platinum	1,000,000^{‡}
^{‡} Sales+streaming figures based on certification alone.

== 50th anniversary mix-up and release ==
EMI released a 50th anniversary limited-edition replica of the original single, featuring "Love Me Do" backed with "P.S. I Love You", in October 2012. The 7-inch disc was originally scheduled to hit stores on 5 October, but was recalled when it was discovered that the pressings contained the Andy White version instead of the Ringo Starr version as intended. The White version was recalled, and the correct version with Ringo Starr on drums was issued on 22 October 2012.

== Personnel ==
According to Ian MacDonald, except where noted:

The Beatles

- Paul McCartney – vocals, bass
- John Lennon – vocals, acoustic guitar, harmonica
- George Harrison – acoustic guitar
- Ringo Starr – drums (1962 single); tambourine (album and later singles)
- Pete Best – drums (1962 demo/audition – formally released on Anthology 1 in 1995)

Additional musician

- Andy White – drums (album and later singles)

== Recording and mixing details ==
- 6 June 1962: an unknown number of takes recorded for what was most likely an artist test.
- 4 September 1962: an unknown number of takes recorded. Mono mixing of the song from an unknown take number.
- 11 September 1962: 18 takes recorded with Andy White on drums. Take 18 used as master.

== Cover versions ==
- David Bowie performed a medley of "Love Me Do" and "The Jean Genie" on 3 July 1973 at the Hammersmith Odeon featuring Jeff Beck on guitar. The song was not included in the film of the concert, Ziggy Stardust and the Spiders from Mars by documentary filmmaker D. A. Pennebaker. The performance was later included in the documentary Moonage Daydream by Brett Morgen and on its soundtrack.

== See also ==
- List of Billboard Hot 100 chart achievements and milestones

== Sources ==
- Gambaccini, Paul (1989). British Hit Singles. London: Guinness Publishing. ISBN 0-85112-941-2.
- Badman, Keith. The Beatles Off The Record.
- The Beatles (2000). The Beatles Anthology. San Francisco: Chronicle Books. ISBN 0-8118-2684-8.
- "Cash Box Top 100 Singles". Cash Box. 25 April 1964. Archived from the original on 10 October 2012.
- Emerick, Geoff; Massey, Howard (2006). Here, There and Everywhere: My Life Recording the Music of the Beatles. New York: Penguin Books. ISBN 1-59240-179-1.
- Everett, Walter (2001). The Beatles as Musicians: The Quarry Men through Rubber Soul. New York: Oxford University Press. ISBN 978-0-19-514105-4.
- Hall, Ron (1990). The CHUM Chart Book: A Complete Listing of Every Record to Make the "CHUM Chart" from Its Beginning on 27 May 1957 Through 14 June 1986. Rexdale (Toronto): Stardust Productions. ISBN 0-920325-15-7.
- Harry, Bill (1992). The Ultimate Beatles Encyclopedia. London: Virgin Books. ISBN 0-86369-681-3.
- Krewen, Nick (18 February 2013). "How The Beatles got their start in Canada". The Toronto Star. Archived from the original on 15 March 2013.
- Lewisohn, Mark. "1000 Days Of Beatlemania". Mojo Magazine (Special Limited Edition).
- Lewisohn, Mark (1988). The Beatles Recording Sessions. New York: Harmony Books. ISBN 0-517-57066-1.
- Lewisohn, Mark (2013). Tune In: The Beatles: All These Years. Crown. ISBN 978-0-8041-3934-2.
- MacDonald, Ian (1998). Revolution in the Head: The Beatles' Records and the Sixties. London: Pimlico (Rand). ISBN 0-7126-6697-4.
- MacDonald, Ian (2005). Revolution in the Head: The Beatles' Records and the Sixties (Second Revised ed.). London: Pimlico (Rand). ISBN 1-84413-828-3.
- Martin, George; Pearson, William (1995). Summer of Love.
- Marsden, Gerry. "Beatles Special". Q Magazine.
- Miles, Barry (1997). Paul McCartney: Many Years From Now. New York: Henry Holt and Company. ISBN 0-8050-5249-6.
- Norman, Philip (1993). Shout!. London: Penguin Books. ISBN 0-14-017410-9.
- Pollack, Alan W. (2000) [1990]. "Love Me Do". Notes On ... Series.
- Salewicz, Chris (1986). McCartney-The Biography. London: Queen Anne Press. ISBN 0-356-12454-1.
- Southall, Brian (1982). Abbey Road. The Story of the World's Most Famous Recording Studios. London: Patrick Stephens. ISBN 0-85059-810-9.
