= Ask Me Why =

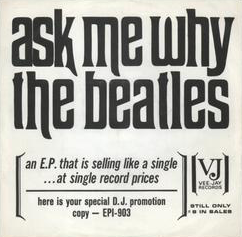
- US promotional single sleeve

Single by the Beatles

from the album Please Please Me
- A-side: "Please Please Me"
- Released: 11 January 1963 (UK); 25 February 1963 (US)
- Recorded: 26 November 1962
- Studio: EMI, London
- Genre: Pop
- Length: 2:24
- Label: Parlophone (UK); Vee-Jay (US)
- Songwriter: Lennon–McCartney
- Producer: George Martin

The Beatles UK singles chronology
"Love Me Do" (1962)	"Please Please Me" / "Ask Me Why" (1963)	"From Me to You" (1963)

The Beatles US singles chronology
"Please Please Me" / "Ask Me Why" (1963)	"From Me to You" (1963)

Alternative cover
- B-side label of UK single

"Ask Me Why" is a song by the English rock band the Beatles originally released in the United Kingdom as the B-side of their single "Please Please Me". It was also included on their 1963 debut album Please Please Me. It was written primarily by John Lennon and credited to the Lennon–McCartney partnership.

== Composition ==
Written in early 1962, "Ask Me Why" is principally a John Lennon composition, but was credited to Lennon and Paul McCartney, as were all other Lennon–McCartney originals on the first pressings of Please Please Me album. McCartney said, "It was John's original idea and we both sat down and wrote it together, just did a job on it. It was mostly John's." It was part of their live act prior to their recording contract, and was one of the songs performed at their first Parlophone recording session in EMI's Abbey Road studio two on 6 June 1962. The song emulates the style of The Miracles, by whom Lennon was influenced, and draws its opening guitar phrase from the Miracles' "What's So Good About Goodbye" (1961).

=== Structure ===
The song is in the key of E major, with some leaning to its relative minor of C♯ minor, and is in 4/4 time. Structurally, the song is complex and, as Alan Pollack states, contains three different variants of the verse. The song also contains "jazzy parallel sevenths" in most of the chords, and has a live ending.

== Recording ==
"Ask Me Why" was originally recorded at Abbey Road studios on 6 June 1962 with drummer Pete Best. As the session was a 'commercial test', none of the performances recorded that day were deemed suitable for release, and the two quarter-inch tape reels from that session are presumed to have been destroyed by EMI. However, two songs survived; "Besame Mucho" and "Love Me Do" were later discovered on acetate discs. The group also performed "Ask Me Why" for the BBC Light Programme's Teenager's Turn – Here We Go; the performance, recorded at the BBC Playhouse in Hulme, Manchester, was broadcast nine days after the EMI session.

The song was recorded again, along with "Please Please Me", on 26 November 1962 with Ringo Starr on drums. The Beatles also rehearsed "Tip of My Tongue", another Lennon and McCartney song which was also being considered for the B-side of the "Please Please Me" single. However, producer George Martin felt that "Tip of My Tongue" still needed some work, and it was eventually given to Tommy Quickly to record.

== Other releases ==
- Capitol Records, EMI's American counterpart to Parlophone, initially refused to distribute Beatle music in the US and so the "Please Please Me"/"Ask Me Why" single was released by Vee-Jay Records on 25 February 1963.
- Vee-Jay included "Ask Me Why" on version 2 of Introducing... The Beatles.
- Capitol eventually released "Ask Me Why" in 1965 on The Early Beatles when Vee-Jay's rights expired.
- A live version from December 1962 was released on the German/UK version of Live! at the Star-Club in Hamburg, Germany; 1962 album in 1977, but was left off the initial US version.
- A version was recorded for the BBC on 3 September 1963. It was released on On Air – Live at the BBC Volume 2 in 2013.

== Cover versions ==
The song was covered by the Smithereens on their 2008 album B-Sides The Beatles.

== Personnel ==
- John Lennon – vocals, acoustic rhythm guitar
- Paul McCartney – bass, backing vocals
- George Harrison – lead guitar, backing vocals
- Ringo Starr – drums

Engineered by Norman Smith

Personnel per Ian MacDonald
