= Misery (Beatles song) =

- The German single release of the song, backed with "Ask Me Why"

Single by the Beatles

from the album Please Please Me
- B-side: "Ask Me Why"
- Released: 22 March 1963
- Recorded: 11 and 20 February 1963
- Studio: EMI, London
- Genre: Merseybeat
- Length: 1:47
- Label: Parlophone
- Songwriter: McCartney-Lennon
- Producer: George Martin

"Misery" is a song by the English rock band the Beatles from their 1963 debut album Please Please Me. It was co-written by John Lennon and Paul McCartney. According to Lennon, "It was kind of a John song more than a Paul song, but it was written together." McCartney was to say: "I don't think either one of us dominated on that one, it was just a hacking job."

A 1963 single by Kenny Lynch made "Misery" the first Beatles' song to be covered by another artist.

== Background ==
In February 1963, Helen Shapiro was Britain's most successful female singer (having first achieved chart success two years earlier at the age of 14), and The Beatles were fifth on the bill as part of her nationwide tour of the United Kingdom. Her artist and repertoire manager, Norrie Paramor, was looking for new material for a country and western album she planned to record in Nashville, Tennessee and suggested that the Beatles compose a song especially for her. "Misery" was started backstage before The Beatles' performance at the King's Hall, Stoke-on-Trent, on 26 January 1963, and later completed at Paul McCartney's Forthlin Road home. At the time, McCartney commented: "We've called it 'Misery', but it isn't as slow as it sounds, it moves along at quite a pace, and we think Helen will make a pretty good job of it." But Paramor considered it unsuitable, and so British singer and entertainer Kenny Lynch, who was on the same tour, recorded it instead (His Master's Voice Pop 1136), thus becoming the first artist to cover a Lennon–McCartney composition although he failed to enter the charts with it. In 1973, Lynch appeared in the cover photograph for McCartney's album, Band on the Run.

When the Beatles needed original material for their Please Please Me LP, they recorded it themselves, giving its treatment, according to writer Ian MacDonald, "a droll portrait of adolescent self-pity". It was credited to McCartney and Lennon in that order, as were all other Lennon & McCartney originals on the Please Please Me album. The songwriting credit was changed to what would become the more familiar "Lennon–McCartney" for their second album, With the Beatles. McCartney: "It was our first stab at a ballad and had a little spoken preface. It was co-written. I don't think either of us dominated on that one, it was just a job, you could have called us hacks, hacking out a song for someone." (Barry Miles. Paul McCartney: Many Years From Now).

The Beatles recorded "Misery" on 11 February 1963 (marathon session) in 11 takes. Norman Smith was the engineer.

George Martin played the piano solo, which was added at a later date, and preferred recording this onto the recorded track at half speed an octave below, which would then sound correct at normal speed.

== Release ==
- British LP: Please Please Me
- American LP: Introducing... The Beatles
- British EP: The Beatles (No. 1)

== Personnel ==
- John Lennon – lead vocals, acoustic rhythm guitar
- Paul McCartney – lead vocals, bass guitar
- George Harrison – lead guitar
- Ringo Starr – drums
- George Martin – piano, producer

Personnel per MacDonald

== Cover versions ==
Year	Artist	Release
1963	Kenny Lynch	
1976	The Flamin' Groovies	Shake Some Action
1993	Eva Braun	Unplugged

== Charts ==
Weekly chart performance for "Misery"
Chart (1964)	Peak
Italy (Musica e Dischi)	9
