= Tollie Records =

US record label; imprint of Vee Jay Records

- Parent company: Vee Jay Records
- Founded: 1964
- Status: Defunct
- Distributor: Vee Jay Records
- Genre: Jazz, folk, pop
- Country of origin: United States

Tollie Records was a record label formed in February 1964, as a subsidiary label of Vee-Jay Records. It closed in May 1965.

== Background ==
The label distributed two of the Beatles' singles in the United States before Capitol Records eventually took over. The first single was "Twist and Shout" b/w "There's a Place" (Tollie 9001), which was released in February 1964, amid the flurry of Beatlemania that was sweeping the United States at that time. This single version of their recording reached the number 2 position on Billboard's Top 40 singles chart, with its B-side "There's a Place" reaching number 74.

The second single released by Tollie was "Love Me Do" b/w "P.S. I Love You" (Tollie 9008), in April 1964. It went all the way to number 1 in Billboard, while its B-side "PS I Love You" reached number 10. Although the label released a total of 48 singles before it ceased operation in 1965, the Beatles records were its only million-sellers. The label's second release was the Dowlands' cover of the Beatles "All My Loving" b/w "Hey Sally" (Tollie 9002). The Dowlands had a UK number 24 hit with the track, which was produced by Joe Meek. Their recording is an almost exact copy of George Martin's Beatles production.

Previous releases of some early Beatles songs on the Vee-Jay label in the summer of 1963 failed to chart in America. "From Me to You" reached no higher than No. 47 on one American Northwest Chart (KISN Radio in Portland, Oregon), in late August 1963.

== History ==
Don Cole and Alleyne recorded the songs, "Something's Got a Hold of Me and "Gotta' Find My Baby" which were released on single, Tollie 4186 in 1964.

A group called The Angelos had recorded "Backfield in Motion" (no connection to a later song of the same name by Mel & Tim) which was released in 1964 on Tollie 9003. It was advertised in the 7 March 1964 issue of Cash Box. It was a Cash Box Newcomer Pick for the week of 14 March 1964. The single did have some potential, and the reviewer in the 14 March issue of Cash Box said it could be flying high in the weeks to come. It did get airplay in Philadelphia and for the week of 1 August, it was one of the seven singles in the Billboard Requests and Good Programming section of the "Analysis of Philadelphia Market" list by Georgie Woods and Jimmy Bishop of WDAS. The song was later covered by Joe South and the Believers, and issued on the Columbia label. Interestingly, Joe South's other group, The Chips had recorded for the Tollie label.

It was reported in the 14 November 1964 issue of Cash Box that Tollie Records had ventured into country music, and they had released four singles in the previous week. The new artists were, Ray Smith, Ray Godfrey, Eddie McDuff, and Peanut Montgomery II. They all joined Tollie executives, Steve Clark and Ray Harris for the 39th annual Grand Ole Opry birthday, an event sponsored by Nashville radio station WSM. Clark who oversaw the running of Tollie was also the vice-president of the parent company, Vee-Jay Records. According to him, the venture into country music was to broaden the growth picture of Tollie so it could be a major competitor of the parent co. They were also planning to release some country albums. Also in that week period, Tollie artist, Terry Black's single, "Unless You Care" had made its debut at no. 93 in the Cash Box Top 100 Singles chart. Joey Paige who was another Tollie artist had just released "Going Back to Tennessee" on Tollie 9025 which was described by Cash Box as a Chuck Berry-styled rocker. The magazine gave it a B+ and noted its teen appeal.

An advertisement appeared in the 5 December issue of Billboard for two releases. A single by Jimmy Hughes, "I'm Getting Better" bw "I Want Justice" was released on the fame label. Tollie Records was the exclusive distributor for that release. Ray Smith also had a release. "Here Comes My Baby Back Again" bw "Did We Have a Party" was released on Tollie 9029.

It was reported by Cash Box in the magazine's 19 December issue that Steve Clark of Tollie Records had gotten hold of Dallas singer Eddie McDuff's masters. They were "Toy Heart and "Hello Lonesome". McDuff's recording was getting some airplay.

== See also ==
- List of record labels
