= Please Please Me =

1963 studio album by the Beatles

Studio album by the Beatles
- Released: 22 March 1963
- Recorded: 11 September 1962 – 20 February 1963
- Studios: EMI, London
- Genres: Merseybeat; rock and roll; pop
- Length: 31:59
- Label: Parlophone
- Producer: George Martin

The Beatles chronology
Please Please Me (1963)	With the Beatles (1963)

Singles from Please Please Me
- 1. "Love Me Do" / "P.S. I Love You" Released: 5 October 1962; 2. "Please Please Me" / "Ask Me Why" Released: 11 January 1963

Please Please Me is the debut studio album by English rock band the Beatles. Produced by George Martin, it was released in the United Kingdom on EMI's Parlophone label on 22 March 1963. The album's 14 tracks include cover songs and original material written by the partnership of band members John Lennon and Paul McCartney.

The Beatles had signed with EMI in May 1962 and been assigned to the Parlophone label run by Martin. They released their debut single "Love Me Do" in October, which surprised Martin by reaching number 17 on what would become the official UK singles chart. Impressed, Martin suggested they record a live album and helped arrange their next single, "Please Please Me", which topped the NME singles chart. Finding the Cavern Club, the band's venue in their native Liverpool, unsuitable for recording, Martin switched to a simple studio album. The Beatles recorded Please Please Me in one day at EMI Studios on 11 February 1963, with Martin adding overdubs to "Misery" and "Baby It's You" nine days later. The four songs from their two previously released singles were added to the album, although a different version of "Love Me Do" was used for the album.

The album was well received in Britain, where it remained in the Top 10 for over a year, a record for a debut album that stood for half a century. The presence of several songs written by band members Lennon–McCartney (credited as "McCartney–Lennon" at the time) was unusual and marked the emergence of a "self-contained rock band". On the other hand, the album was not released in the US, where the band sold poorly for most of 1963; after the stateside emergence of Beatlemania, Vee-Jay Records released a mild abridgment of the album as Introducing... The Beatles in early 1964, while EMI's American label Capitol Records divided the material from Please Please Me across multiple albums. Other countries also received different versions of the album, which continued until 1987, when the entirety of the Beatles catalogue was brought to CD and internationally standardised to the UK albums. Please Please Me remains critically acclaimed; it was voted 39th on Rolling Stone's list of the "500 Greatest Albums of All Time" in 2012, and number 622 in the third edition of Colin Larkin's All Time Top 1000 Albums in 2000.

== Background ==
The Beatles originated in the skiffle scene of Liverpool in the late 1950s as the Quarrymen, and by 1961 had solidified their lineup with John Lennon on rhythm guitar, Paul McCartney on bass, George Harrison on lead guitar, and Pete Best on drums. The band mostly played cover songs, although Lennon and McCartney had a budding songwriting partnership that also contributed material. After a stint in Hamburg backing English singer Tony Sheridan and releasing a single with Sheridan, "My Bonnie", on which they were credited as "The Beat Brothers", they returned to Liverpool in late 1961. Shortly after their return they were approached by Brian Epstein, a music store manager who recognized the group's local popularity and became the group's new manager. After a failed audition at Decca Records at the beginning of 1962, Epstein was eventually able to sign the group to EMI that May.

EMI offered the Beatles a recording contract on its Parlophone label run by George Martin. Though Martin was drawn to the Beatles' personalities and charisma, he was initially unconvinced that they could write hit songs. Their first session, on 6 June, with Best on drums, resulted in no recordings suitable for release. Martin reacted negatively to Best's presence and insisted on the use of a session drummer in his stead; although this was standard procedure at the time, the band took this as a cue to drop Best in favour of Rory Storm and the Hurricanes drummer Ringo Starr. Their second session, on 4 September and now with Starr on drums, produced "Love Me Do", which became their first single several weeks later, and an early version of "Please Please Me". On 11 September, the band re-recorded "Love Me Do" with session drummer Andy White and recorded "P.S. I Love You", which became the B-side to "Love Me Do". They also recorded a sped-up version of "Please Please Me", which Martin believed had hit potential but required more work.

Martin doubted the commercial appeal of "Love Me Do" and was surprised when it reached No. 17 on the British charts in November. Now convinced that the Beatles could write hits, Martin met the Beatles on 16 November and made two suggestions for their upcoming work. First, he suggested that they re-record "Please Please Me" and issue it as the Beatles' second single. Next, he proposed that they record a full album—a recommendation Beatles historian Mark Lewisohn deemed "genuinely mind-boggling" because the Beatles were so new to the music scene and because the album market was dominated by adult buyers, not teenagers. On 26 November, the Beatles held another session for "Please Please Me" (to be backed with "Ask Me Why"), after which Martin predicted that they had just made their first number one record.

As the Beatles had extensive stage experience and a large following of local fans in Liverpool, Martin proposed the band could record a live album, primarily of Lennon–McCartney songs at their resident venue, the Cavern Club, in December. Martin planned to attend the Beatles' 18 November Cavern concert to gauge its suitability for recording, though he postponed this visit until 12 December. Upon his visit to the Cavern, Martin decided the acoustics would be unsuitable and decided to record a traditional studio album in February 1963; as the Beatles had already recorded four songs for release, they would record another ten to complete the album. In the meantime, Martin also solicited the Beatles' input for album names; McCartney suggested Off the Beatle Track.

The single "Please Please Me" was released on 11 January 1963 and reached number one on the NME, Melody Maker, and Disc charts. In early February, the group undertook their first national tour, and they planned to record their album during a break in the tour on 11 February.

== Recording ==
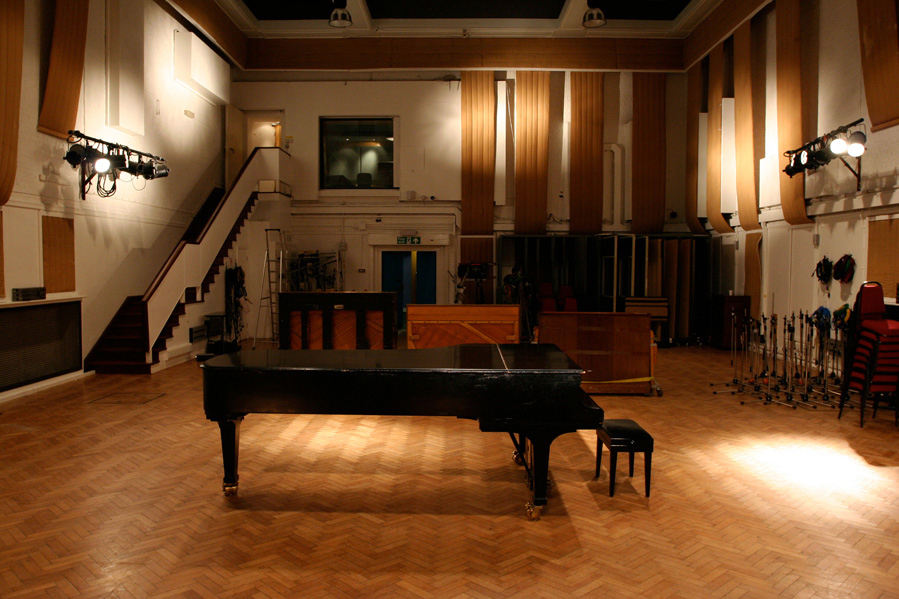
Studio 2 at EMI Studios, where the Beatles recorded the entirety of Please Please Me

Martin asked the band if they had any songs that they could record quickly. According to Martin, "It was a straightforward performance of their stage repertoire – a broadcast, more or less." Initially, a morning and afternoon session only were booked; the evening session was added later. Mark Lewisohn later wrote: "There can scarcely have been 585 more productive minutes in the history of recorded music". Martin oversaw each session on the day, with Norman Smith as first engineer and Richard Langham as second engineer.

We didn't rehearse our first album. In my head, it was done "live". We did the songs through first, so they could get some sort of sound on each one; then we had to just run, run them down.

— Ringo Starr

On 11 February 1963, the Beatles arrived with John Lennon suffering from a bad cold, which he attempted to treat with a steady supply of throat lozenges. They began their morning session at 10 am with "There's a Place" and "Seventeen" (the working title of what became "I Saw Her Standing There"). The band rehearsed during their lunch break and then proceeded with their afternoon session. In that session, Paul McCartney recorded a double-tracked vocal for "A Taste of Honey" (a standard later covered by renowned soul artists such as The Supremes, Four Tops, and Mel Carter), George Harrison sang lead on "Do You Want to Know a Secret", and Lennon and McCartney sang co-lead on "Misery". During the evening session, the band recorded covers of "Anna (Go to Him)", "Boys" (Ringo Starr's sole vocal), "Chains" and "Baby It's You". The song "Hold Me Tight" was also recorded during the evening session, but proved "surplus to requirements" and was not included on the album. (Note: It was later re-recorded and released on With the Beatles.)

At 10 pm, with the studios set to close soon, the day ended with a cover of "Twist and Shout". The song was picked after a discussion in the studio canteen in which numerous songs were suggested before "Twist and Shout" was chosen. The performance, caught on the first take, prompted Martin to say: "I don't know how they do it. We've been recording all day but the longer we go on the better they get." Lennon later remarked, "The last song nearly killed me. My voice wasn't the same for a long time after; every time I swallowed, it was like sandpaper."

At the end of the evening session at 10:30 pm, the Beatles attended a full tape playback in the studio control room. Lennon reflected, "Waiting to hear that LP played back was one of our most worrying experiences. ... As it happens, we were very happy with the result. The Beatles were not present during an overdub session on 20 February, during which Martin overdubbed piano on "Misery" and celesta on "Baby It's You".

The day of recording cost approximately £400 (equivalent to £7,300 in 2025). Martin said: "There wasn't a lot of money at Parlophone. I was working to an annual budget of £55,000." This budget had to cover all of the artists on Martin's roster. Individually, under a contract with the Musicians' Union, each Beatle collected a session fee of £7 10s (£7.50; equivalent to £137 in 2025) for each three-hour session (10:00 am – 1:00 pm / 2:30 pm – 5:30 pm / 7:30 pm – 10:30 pm).

Before deciding on the title Please Please Me, Martin considered calling the album Off the Beatle Track, a title he would later use for his own orchestral album of Beatles songs. The album was recorded on a two-track BTR tape machine with most of the instruments on one track and the vocals on the other, allowing Martin to better balance the two in the final mono mix. A stereo mix was also made with one track on the left channel and the other on the right, as well as an added layer of reverb to better blend the two tracks together. The two tracks generally divided the instrumental track from the vocals, with the exception of "Boys", in which the close proximity of Ringo's drums to his vocal microphone placed the drums (but not the other instruments) on the vocal channel.

Two tracks, "Love Me Do" and "P.S. I Love You", were only mixed for mono for the single's release and no stereo versions were made, so, for the stereo version of the album, during the mixing sessions on 25 February 1963, Martin created "mock stereo" versions by emphasising low frequencies on one side and high frequencies on the other. These versions would continue to be made available via compilation albums (such as 1962–1966), and on Mobile Fidelity Sound Labs' half-speed mastered vinyl releases (catalogue number MFSL-1-101) sourced from EMI's original stereo master tapes, until the Beatles' catalogue was standardised and issued on compact disc in 1987, starting with the first four UK albums being issued in their mono versions. However, when Capitol Records issued the second volume of American Beatles albums on compact disc (The Capitol Albums, Volume 2) in 2006, the same mock stereo versions that appeared on The Early Beatles were included. When the entire catalogue was remastered for release in 2009, the mono mixes were chosen for inclusion on the stereo reissues, and appear on all releases since, including newer compilations and variations.

== Artwork and packaging ==
George Martin was an honorary fellow of the Zoological Society of London, which owns London Zoo, and he thought that it might be good publicity for the zoo to have the Beatles pose outside the insect house for the cover photography of the album. However, the society turned down Martin's request, and instead, Angus McBean was asked to take the distinctive colour photograph of the group looking down over the stairwell inside EMI's London headquarters in Manchester Square. Martin was to write later: "We rang up the legendary theatre photographer Angus McBean, and bingo, he came round and did it there and then. It was done in an almighty rush, like the music. Thereafter, though, the Beatles' own creativity came bursting to the fore." In 1969, the Beatles asked McBean to recreate this shot. Although the 1969 photograph was originally intended for the then-planned Get Back album, it was not used when that project saw eventual release in 1970 as Let It Be. Instead, the 1969 photograph, along with an unused photograph from the 1963 photo shoot, was used in 1973 for the Beatles' retrospective albums 1962–1966 and 1967–1970. Another unused photograph from the 1963 photo shoot was used for The Beatles (No. 1) (EP released 1 November 1963).

The Beatles' press officer Tony Barrow wrote extensive sleeve notes, which included a brief mention of their early 1960s rivals the Shadows.

== Release ==
This album was one of the main ambitions in our lives. We felt that it would be a showcase for the group, and it was tremendously important for us that it sounded bang on the button. As it happened, we were pleased. If not, sore throats or not, we'd have done it all over again. That was the mood we were in. It was break or bust for us.

— Paul McCartney

Parlophone released Please Please Me in the UK on 22 March 1963. As was typical for the time, the LP was initially released in mono, with a stereo release following on 26 April. (Note: Before 1968, stereo was a small proportion of the music market. The album mixing process focused on the mono version, while the stereo version was comparatively rudimentary, displaying a major left-right separation between the rhythm and vocal tracks.) Singles remained the dominant format for pop music, made up mostly of teenage buyers, while more expensive LPs were typically reserved for genres like classical music and jazz, whose listeners could more easily afford the format. Author Barry Miles suggested the album's cover design, promising "Please Please Me", "Love Me Do" and "12 Other Songs", indicated EMI's desire to promote the album towards "die-hard supporters" excited by the two earlier singles.

Please Please Me hit the top of the UK album charts in May 1963 and remained there for 30 weeks before being replaced by With the Beatles. This was an unprecedented achievement for a pop album. At the time, the UK album charts tended to be dominated by film soundtracks and easy listening vocalists. Please Please Me was the first non-soundtrack album to spend more than one year (62 weeks) consecutively inside the top ten of what became the Official UK Albums Chart. This record run of consecutive weeks in the top ten for a debut album stood until April 2013, when Emeli Sandé's Our Version of Events achieved a 63rd consecutive week.

In the 30 March 1963 issue of Record Mirror, Norman Jopling reviewed the album in depth, providing track-by-track reviews for the ten songs that had not been previously released. He concludes that, for a debut, the LP is "surprisingly good and up to standard", and contained many tracks that could have been released as singles, such as "I Saw Her Standing There" and "Misery". Jopling further highlighted the LP's packaging, writing that its cover image and sleeve notes provided extra value. Author Jonathan Gould suggests in retrospect that the album's packaging majorly contributed to its success, promising fans "glossy cover art" and a greater companion to the music than the plain paper packaging then offered by singles.

=== International and CD releases ===
In addition to the UK, Please Please Me was released, un- or lightly modified, in India, continental Europe, Australia, and New Zealand. In New Zealand, the album first appeared only in mono on the black Parlophone label. The following year (1964) EMI (NZ) changed from black to a blue Parlophone label and the album was again available only in mono. Due to constant demand, it was finally made available in stereo, first through the World Record Club on their Young World label in both mono and stereo, and finally on the blue Parlophone label. The album was released in Japan in 1969 with a different cover and a significantly shuffled tracklist.

EMI's American subsidiary Capitol Records had been offered the opportunity to release Beatles material since the 1962 release of "Love Me Do", but turned it down. Vee-Jay Records, a smaller label unaffiliated with EMI, took the initiative of bringing the Beatles to the United States, releasing the "Please Please Me" single on 25 February 1963. Despite its success in Britain, "Please Please Me" failed to chart in the US, and the May release of "From Me to You" was similarly lacklustre, leading Vee-Jay to lose interest in the Beatles. Originally planning on releasing the Please Please Me album unaltered in July, it ended up trimming "Please Please Me" and "Ask Me Why" to fit the standard American album length and releasing it as Introducing... The Beatles in January 1964. Capitol remained unimpressed with the group until the rapid success of "I Want to Hold Your Hand" in Christmas 1963. Buoyed by the resultant Beatlemania and aware of their previous rejection of the Beatles, Capitol released a modified version of the group's second album With the Beatles, coming out with Meet the Beatles! shortly after Vee-Jay had released Introducing... The Beatles. Meet the Beatles! contains "I Saw Her Standing There", which Capitol released as the American B-side of "I Want to Hold Your Hand". Finally acquiring the rights to early Beatles recordings back from Vee-Jay in late 1964, Capitol released most of the other tracks from Please Please Me on The Early Beatles in March 1965, although "Misery" and "There's a Place" remained unreleased by Capitol until 1980's Rarities.

In Canada, the majority of the album's songs were included upon the Canadian-exclusive release Twist and Shout, which featured "From Me to You" and "She Loves You" in place of "I Saw Her Standing There" and "Misery".

The album was released on CD on 26 February 1987, in mono, as were their three subsequent albums, With the Beatles, A Hard Day's Night and Beatles for Sale. It was not released on vinyl or tape in the US until five months later when it was issued for the first time in the US on LP and cassette on 21 July 1987.

Please Please Me was remastered and re-released on CD in stereo, along with all the other original UK studio albums, on 9 September 2009. The 2009 remasters replaced the 1987 remasters. A remastered mono CD was also available as part of The Beatles in Mono box set.

== Critical reception ==
Professional ratings
Review scores
Source	Rating
AllMusic	5/5 stars
The A.V. Club	A
Consequence of Sound	A−
The Daily Telegraph	4/5 stars
Encyclopedia of Popular Music	4/5 stars
MusicHound	3/5 stars
Paste	92/100
Pitchfork	9.5/10
The Rolling Stone Album Guide	5/5 stars
Sputnikmusic	4/5

In a 1987 review coinciding with the album's CD reissue, Rolling Stone magazine's Steve Pond recommended Please Please Me "for the Beatles' unfettered joy at making music". Senior AllMusic editor Stephen Thomas Erlewine summarised, "Decades after its release, the album still sounds fresh", serving as an effective encapsulation of the band's early influences, further finding the covers "impressive" and the originals "astonishing".

Rolling Stone magazine cited Lennon–McCartney's original compositions as early evidence of the Beatles' "[invention of] the idea of the self-contained rock band, writing their own hits and playing their own instruments".

The album's 2009 remaster attracted a number of reviewers. Pitchfork's Tom Ewing described the album as "a raw, high-energy run-through of their early live set" that acts as "the sound of rock'n'roll finding a suddenly large, new audience." He praised the album's cohesiveness, where the "evening with the band" mood sets it apart from the band's other cover-heavy works, creating a non-filler track experience with great covers and originals and, above all, great vocal performances. The same year, Mark Kemp was positive reviewing the band's entire remastered catalogue for Paste, commending the band for infusing African American musical styles with "chirpy harmonies" from girl groups like the Shirelles to create "a sound the pop world had never heard". The Telegraph writer Neil McCormick praised the band's performances throughout the record, contending that "the sheer accomplishment of their tight, syncopated playing and perfect harmony singing is astonishing to behold." Alex Young described the album as a dance masterpiece in Consequence of Sound, finding the remaster an improvement over the original mix.

Writing for BBC Music in 2010, Mike Diver contended that although not regarded as their most critically acclaimed release, Please Please Me stands as a "vital moment" in the band's history, as it "set in motion the wheels that would carry them to the very peak of public recognition, and subsequently into realms of sonic experimentation that would create a template for so much rock and pop music since." Diver further argued that the album's long reign at the top of the UK charts provided a rebuttal to Decca Records' stance that guitar groups were "on the way out". The writers of Rolling Stone agreed in The Rolling Stone Album Guide, writing that Please Please Me acted as a blueprint for "everything the Beatles would ever do".

In Ultimate Classic Rock, Michael Gallucci praised Please Please Me as a cohesive debut album that established a rough blueprint in the Beatles' working methods over the next few years, despite finding some tracks did not work as well as others, concluding: "Please Please Me proved that the music that everyone was ignoring was uniformly great." Gallucci had assessed one year earlier that the album was "the sound of rock 'n' roll at the crossroads." He explained: "On one hand, many of its songs are rooted in the '50s (and earlier) music the group revered. On the other hand, this is the '60s taking shape."

Reflecting on the album in 2016, the NME's Hamish MacBain found it imperfect, but commended the ensemble for creating a record of excellent covers and originals that displayed "flashes of brilliance". MacBain acknowledged the band would make better records, but concluded that "the resulting, snapshot nature" of their debut outing "is exactly what makes it so great".

=== Rankings ===
Please Please Me has made appearances on several best-of lists. In 2012, it was voted 39th on Rolling Stone's list of the 500 Greatest Albums of All Time. It was ranked first among the Beatles' early albums, and sixth of all of the Beatles' albums, with Sgt. Pepper's Lonely Hearts Club Band, Revolver, Rubber Soul, The Beatles (also known as "The White Album") and Abbey Road ranked higher. English writer Colin Larkin listed Please Please Me at number 622 in the third edition of his book All Time Top 1000 Albums (2000). Rolling Stone also placed two songs from the album on its 2004 edition of the "500 Greatest Songs of All Time": "I Saw Her Standing There" at number 140, and "Please Please Me" at number 186.

Several publications, including NME, have named Please Please Me one of the best debut albums of all time, with Rolling Stone and Uncut both ranking it number 17. In 2015, Ultimate Classic Rock ranked it the Beatles' eighth best album and included it in their list of the top 100 rock albums from the 1960s.

=== 50th anniversary ===
In 2013, the album's 50th anniversary was celebrated by modern artists re-recording the album in just one day, as the Beatles recorded it 50 years earlier. Stereophonics recorded a cover of the album's opening track, "I Saw Her Standing There". This and the other recordings were broadcast on BBC Radio 2, and a documentary about the re-recording of the Beatles' debut album was broadcast on BBC Television.

== Track listing ==
All songs written by McCartney–Lennon, except where noted. Track lengths per Jean-Michel Guesdon and Philippe Margotin and lead vocals per Ian MacDonald.

Side one
No.	Title	Writer(s)	Lead vocals	Length
1.	"I Saw Her Standing There"		McCartney	2:52
2.	"Misery"		Lennon and McCartney	1:47
3.	"Anna (Go to Him)"	Arthur Alexander	Lennon	2:54
4.	"Chains"	Gerry Goffin; Carole King	Harrison	2:23
5.	"Boys"	Luther Dixon; Wes Farrell	Starr	2:24
6.	"Ask Me Why"		Lennon	2:24
7.	"Please Please Me"		Lennon and McCartney	2:00
Total length:				16:44

Side two
No.	Title	Writer(s)	Lead vocals	Length
1.	"Love Me Do"		McCartney and Lennon	2:19
2.	"P.S. I Love You"		McCartney	2:02
3.	"Baby It's You"	Mack David; Barney Williams; Burt Bacharach	Lennon	2:35
4.	"Do You Want to Know a Secret"		Harrison	1:56
5.	"A Taste of Honey"	Bobby Scott; Ric Marlow	McCartney	2:01
6.	"There's a Place"		Lennon and McCartney	1:49
7.	"Twist and Shout"	Phil Medley; Bert Russell	Lennon	2:33
Total length:				15:15

== Personnel ==
According to Ian MacDonald and Mark Lewisohn:

The Beatles

- John Lennon – lead, harmony and background vocals; acoustic and electric rhythm guitars; harmonica ("Chains", "Please Please Me", "Love Me Do", "There's a Place"), hand claps ("I Saw Her Standing There")
- Paul McCartney – lead, harmony and background vocals; bass guitar; hand claps ("I Saw Her Standing There")
- George Harrison – harmony and background vocals; lead and acoustic guitars; lead vocals ("Chains" and "Do You Want to Know a Secret"); hand claps ("I Saw Her Standing There")
- Ringo Starr – drums; tambourine ("Love Me Do"); maracas ("P.S. I Love You"); brushes ("A Taste of Honey"); hand claps ("I Saw Her Standing There"); lead vocals ("Boys")

Additional musicians and production

- Stuart Eltham – balance engineer (20 February 1963)
- George Martin – producer, mixer; piano ("Misery"), celesta ("Baby It's You")
- Norman Smith – balance engineer, mixer
- Andy White – drums ("Love Me Do" and "P.S. I Love You")

== Charts ==
=== Weekly charts ===
Original release
Chart (1963–64)	Peak position
UK (Melody Maker)	1
UK (New Musical Express)	1
UK (Record Mirror)	1
UK (Record Retailer)	1
West Germany (Musikmarkt)	4

1987 reissue
Chart	Peak position
Dutch Albums (Album Top 100)	24
UK Albums (Official Charts)	32
US Billboard Top Compact Disks	2

2009 reissue
Chart	Peak position
Austrian Albums (Ö3 Austria)	75
Belgian Albums (Ultratop Flanders)	76
Belgian Albums (Ultratop Wallonia)	78
Dutch Albums (Album Top 100)	89
Finnish Albums (Suomen virallinen lista)	25
Italian Albums (FIMI)	64
New Zealand Albums (RMNZ)	32
Portuguese Albums (AFP)	29
Spanish Albums (Promusicae)	53
Swedish Albums (Sverigetopplistan)	27
Swiss Albums (Schweizer Hitparade)	74

2010 iTunes release
Chart	Peak position
US Billboard 200	155

=== Year-end charts ===
Year-end chart performance for Please Please Me
Chart (1963)	Ranking
UK Record Retailer	2
Chart (1964)	Ranking
UK Record Retailer	6

== Certifications and sales ==
Certifications and sales for Please Please Me
Region	Certification	Certified units/sales
Argentina (CAPIF)	Platinum	60,000^{^}
Australia (ARIA)	Gold	35,000^{^}
Canada (Music Canada)	Gold	50,000^{^}
Denmark (IFPI Danmark)	Platinum	20,000^{‡}
New Zealand (RMNZ) Reissue	Gold	7,500^{^}
United Kingdom Original release	—	500,000
United Kingdom (BPI) sales since 2009	Platinum	300,000^{‡}
United States (RIAA)	Platinum	1,000,000^{^}
^{^} Shipments figures based on certification alone.^{‡} Sales+streaming figures based on certification alone.

^{†} BPI certification awarded only for sales since 1994.

== See also ==
- Outline of the Beatles
- The Beatles timeline
- The Beatles albums discography
