= Please Please Me (song) =

1963 song by the Beatles

- US picture sleeve (Vee-Jay 1964)

Single by the Beatles

from the album Please Please Me
- B-side: "Ask Me Why" (UK & US 1st release) "From Me to You" (US re-release)
- Released: 11 January 1963 (UK); 25 February 1963 (US); 3 January 1964 (US re-release)
- Recorded: 26 November 1962
- Studio: EMI, London
- Genre: Merseybeat; rock and roll
- Length: 2:00
- Label: Parlophone (UK); Vee-Jay (US)
- Songwriter: McCartney–Lennon
- Producer: George Martin

The Beatles UK singles chronology
"Love Me Do" (1962)	"Please Please Me" (1963)	"From Me to You" (1963)

The Beatles US singles chronology
"Please Please Me" (1963)	"From Me to You" (1963)

"Please Please Me" is a song by the English rock band the Beatles. It was their second single in the United Kingdom, and their first in the United States. It is also the title track of their first LP, which was recorded to capitalise on the success of the single. It is a John Lennon composition (credited to McCartney–Lennon), although its ultimate form was significantly influenced by producer George Martin.

The single was released in the UK on 11 January 1963 and reached No. 1 on the New Musical Express and Melody Maker charts. However, it only reached No. 2 on the Record Retailer chart, which subsequently evolved into the UK singles chart. Because of this, it was not included on the Beatles' number ones compilation, 1.

The single, as initially released with "Ask Me Why" on the B-side, failed to make much impact in the US in February 1963, but when re-released there on 3 January 1964 (this time with "From Me to You" on the B-side), it reached No. 3 on the Billboard Hot 100. The song was also re-released on 6 December 1982 by Parlophone in the UK.

== Writing ==
"Please Please Me" sample

John Lennon composed "Please Please Me" in Liverpool in June 1962 alone. Lennon first conceived it as a bluesy, slow tempo song. Lennon recalled: "I remember the day I wrote it, I heard Roy Orbison doing 'Only the Lonely', or something. And I was also always intrigued by the words to a Bing Crosby song that went, 'Please lend a little ear to my pleas'. The double use of the word 'please'. So it was a combination of Roy Orbison and Bing Crosby". Originally it was vocally sparse, did not contain any harmonies or responses, nor did it have the scaled harmonica intro. Lennon later stated: "Please Please Me is my song completely. It was my attempt at writing a Roy Orbison song, would you believe it? I wrote it in the bedroom in my house at Menlove Avenue, which was my auntie's place".

By late 1962, the Beatles had accomplished a modest debut success with "Love Me Do", but outside of Liverpool and Hamburg they were still practically unknown. Part of the problem was that the group were committed to begin what was to be their final Hamburg season just as "Love Me Do" entered the British charts and so were unable to actively promote it on their home soil. Nonetheless, their producer, George Martin, felt it was a promising start and decided to go ahead with a second single. George Martin has stated that the original version of "Please Please Me" was "rather dreary" and too slow, and consequently had little prospect of being the big hit the band were looking for. Martin said, "I was still thinking that we should release their [earlier] recording of 'How Do You Do It?'", a previously taped Mitch Murray song that Martin insisted the Beatles record which he had seriously considered as an alternative debut single instead of "Love Me Do". The group replied that they were only interested in recording their own material. McCartney said: "It was symptomatic of our group that we turned down 'How Do You Do It?'." Ringo Starr commented: "I remember us all being ready to stand up for the principle of, 'We have written these songs and we want to do them'". George Martin was ultimately sympathetic to their appeals, but said later: "[I] would still have issued "How Do You Do It?" had they not persuaded me to listen to another version of "Please Please Me". "How Do You Do It?" was later a number one hit for Gerry & the Pacemakers.

== Recording ==
The Beatles first presented "Please Please Me" to George Martin at their 4 September 1962 session. Ringo Starr in Anthology stated: "On my first visit in September we just ran through some tracks for George Martin. We even did 'Please Please Me'. I remember that, because while we were recording it I was playing the bass drum with a maraca in one hand and a tambourine in the other." John Lennon is quoted in Anthology as saying: "We'd had a top 30 entry with 'Love Me Do' and we really thought we were on top of the world. Then came 'Please Please Me'—and wham! We tried to make it as simple as possible. Some of the stuff we've written in the past has been a bit way-out, but we aimed this one straight at the hit parade ... We almost abandoned it as the B-side of 'Love Me Do'. We changed our minds only because we were so tired the night we did 'Love Me Do'. We'd been going over it a few times and when we came to the question of the flipside, we intended using 'Please Please Me'. Our recording manager, George Martin, thought our arrangement was fussy, so we tried to make it simpler. We were getting very tired, though, and we just couldn't seem to get it right. We are conscientious about our work and we don't like to rush things."

In the opinion of George Martin, "At that stage 'Please Please Me' was a very dreary song. It was like a Roy Orbison number, very slow, bluesy vocals. It was obvious to me that it badly needed pepping up. I told them to bring it in next time and we'd have another go at it." He asked the Beatles to consider making major changes to it, including increasing its tempo. Paul McCartney in Anthology stated: "We sang it and George Martin said, 'Can we change the tempo?' We said, 'What's that?' He said, 'Make it a bit faster. Let me try it.' And he did. We thought, 'Oh, that's all right, yes.' Actually, we were a bit embarrassed that he had found a better tempo than we had."

A faster-tempo version without harmonica was recorded at Abbey Road on 11 September, the only session in which session drummer Andy White was present. The up-tempo track, No. 24 on Anthology 1, was believed to have been wiped until its rediscovery in 1994 during the Anthology production, with Anthology notes seeming to indicate that it features drummer Andy White rather than Ringo Starr. The point is not addressed in the Mark Lewisohn-researched Anthology notes, although author Lewisohn's 1988 The Beatles Recording Sessions quotes session engineer Ron Richards as saying, "Ringo didn't play drums at all that evening." However, recording technician Geoff Emerick later wrote that, following White's departure, he witnessed Beatles roadie Mal Evans set up Starr's kit and the group record "Please Please Me" with Starr on drums. In a 2012 BBC interview, Andy White claimed that the drumming on the hit single was his:

From the drum sound I can tell that I was on it, because it was a vastly different sound to Ringo's drumset at that time. This was before he got the Ludwig kit. Each drummer gets an individual sound, first of all by the way they tune the drums and then by the way they play the drums.

White, however, was not at the studio for the final recording on 26 November and was only hired for the 11 September session. As recorded on 26 November, Lennon's harmonica playing features prominently and, similar to other early Beatles' compositions such as "Love Me Do" and "From Me to You", opens the song. McCartney and Lennon initially share the vocals with McCartney holding a high note while Lennon drops down through the scale, a ploy they learned from the Everly Brothers UK hit song "Cathy's Clown" (April 1960). McCartney said: "I did the trick of remaining on the high note while the melody cascaded down from it". Ringo Starr asserts himself, exorcising any lingering doubts from the "Love Me Do" sessions regarding his ability. Where "Love Me Do" had been arguably parochial, relying to a large extent on their existing home fans for support, "Please Please Me" would be groundbreaking, especially as the Beatles were now back in the UK and able to appear on influential national television shows such as Thank Your Lucky Stars.

By the time it was brought back into the studio on 26 November 1962, its arrangement had been radically altered, and it took 18 takes to record what George Martin immediately predicted would be their first major hit.

A new mix was created for the stereo version of the album, and on 25 February 1963, Martin made one created from original takes 16, 17 and 18. This stereo version has Lennon fluffing the final verse, causing him to sing 'come on' with a slight chuckle in his voice. Also different in the stereo mix is Harrison's lead guitar line before the final verse; rather than duplicating the overdubbed harmonica exactly as he had earlier in the song, Harrison drops down a fourth for the third note, rather than continuing down by stepwise motion.

The song was credited to "McCartney–Lennon", as were all other Lennon–McCartney originals on the Please Please Me album. The songwriting credit was changed to the more familiar "Lennon–McCartney" sequence for their second album, With the Beatles.

== Publishing ==
According to Ray Coleman's biography, Brian Epstein: The Man Who Made the Beatles, Epstein had been dissatisfied with EMI's promotional efforts for "Love Me Do" (published by EMI's subsidiary Ardmore & Beechwood) and asked George Martin if he could suggest a publisher who would push the single more effectively. Martin suggested three candidates, one of whom was Dick James. Epstein made an appointment to meet with him for 11 a.m. the following day, as well as an appointment with another EMI subsidiary at 10 a.m. Arriving on time for the first meeting, Epstein was informed that the executive he was due to meet had not arrived yet. Still waiting at 10:25, he decided that he was not prepared to do business with an organisation that could not keep a scheduled appointment, and left.

Arriving at James' office 20 minutes early, he apologised to the receptionist and said he was happy to wait until the appointed time. The receptionist nevertheless phoned James, who promptly came out of his office, welcomed Epstein and quickly got down to business. Epstein played the single and James remarked that it was a number one record. Epstein replied that if James could achieve that then he would be prepared to offer him a long-term publishing deal. James phoned Philip Jones, producer of ITV television show Thank Your Lucky Stars, played the song for him over the telephone, and gained the Beatles a slot on the next edition of the programme. The two then shook hands on a deal that would make them, and the Beatles, extremely wealthy.

== UK release ==
The new single was released in the UK on 11 January 1963 during one of the worst winters in British history. On 19 January much of the population was snowed-in at home watching the Beatles perform the song on the Saturday night TV show, Thank Your Lucky Stars. The national exposure of the song, as well as the band's unusual appearance and hair style, generated a lot of attention, and they were booked by promoter Arthur Howes for a series of national tours. The first tour was as a support band for Helen Shapiro in February, for Tommy Roe and Chris Montez in March, and for Roy Orbison in May. During breaks in the touring schedule, the Beatles performed the song on a number of BBC national radio programmes. The touring and TV appearances, along with extensive press coverage, propelled the single to the top of most of the British charts and the Beatles, much to their embarrassment, were moved to the top of the bill on the Tommy Roe and Roy Orbison tours.

== Original US release ==
Capitol Records, EMI's United States label, was offered the right to release "Please Please Me" in the US, but turned it down. Instead, it was placed with Transglobal, an EMI affiliate that worked to place foreign masters with US record labels. It was told to find an American outlet for the record as quickly as possible, in order to appease Martin and Beatles manager Brian Epstein. "Please Please Me" was then offered to Atlantic, which also rejected it. Finally, Vee-Jay, which had released the top-five hit "I Remember You" by Frank Ifield in 1962 (another record that Capitol had turned down), was offered the right to issue "Please Please Me" in the States, and chose to do so. The exact date of the US issue was lost for decades, but research published in 2004 showed that the single, "Please Please Me"/"Ask Me Why", was released by Vee-Jay on 7 February 1963.

Dick Biondi, a disc jockey on WLS in Chicago and a friend of Vee-Jay executive Ewart Abner, played the song on the radio from February 1963, perhaps as early as 8 February 1963, thus becoming the first DJ to play a Beatles record in the US. Art Roberts, a legendary DJ and music director at the time, tells how the record came to be played first at the station:

Let me tell you the story of 'Please Please Me'. The record was released on the Vee-Jay label. It was a local Chicago recording company. The owner, Ewart Abner, brought a copy of the record to WLS. I was the music director at the time and listened to his story about a group, and looked at pictures in teen magazines he brought back from England. I figured, what if this group would get as popular in the United States as they were in England and Europe. So I added the record to the list.

On WLS, "Please Please Me" peaked at No. 35 on 15 March on the second of its two weeks on the "Silver Dollar Survey", in addition to its two airplay weeks. However, the song did not chart on any other major national American survey until 1964.

The first pressings of the Vee-Jay single, which was assigned the catalog number 498, featured a typographical error: the band's name was spelled "The Beattles" with two "t"s. WLS used this spelling on its Silver Dollar Surveys in 1963. Later copies of the single corrected this misspelling. However, the same spelling was also on the Silver Dollar Surveys for the first two weeks of "I Want to Hold Your Hand" in 1964. Also, the composers on the Vee-Jay edition were credited on both sides as "J. Lennon-P. McCartney", unlike on the UK Parlophone edition (which listed the names in the reverse order). However, with the exception of Chicago, the record was a failure as it sold approximately 7,310 copies. Today, copies of Vee-Jay 498—whether with the incorrect or correct spelling of the Beatles on the label—are valuable collector's items.

== Second US release ==
In the wake of the rush-release of "I Want to Hold Your Hand" in the United States, Vee-Jay reissued "Please Please Me" on or about 3 January 1964, the day that film footage of the Beatles appeared on a prime time episode of The Jack Paar Program on NBC Television. Playing it safe, the label chose to put "From Me to You" on the B-side, as Del Shannon's version had been a minor hit in 1963. The new single was issued with the catalog number 581.

This time, "Please Please Me" was a massive hit, eventually peaking at No. 3 on the Billboard Hot 100 chart for the week ending 14 March 1964, trailing only "I Want to Hold Your Hand" and "She Loves You". "Please Please Me" was at No. 5 on the Hot 100 on 4 April 1964, the date on which the Beatles held the top five spots.

Because Vee-Jay wanted to get as many copies of the record pressed as quickly as possible, it did not insist on uniformity from one pressing plant to another. As a result, a dizzying number of label variations exist. Some of these added a comma to the song title, rendering it as "Please, Please Me". Additionally, some copies of the record were issued with a picture sleeve. Early promotional copies had a special sleeve proclaiming "Please Please Me" as "The Record That Started Beatlemania". The text on the sleeve noted that the Beatles had just appeared on Paar's program and were scheduled to appear on The Ed Sullivan Show in February. This sleeve is considered to be extremely rare.

At least 1.1 million copies of the reissue were sold. If Vee-Jay had been a member of the RIAA, the single would have been certified gold.

== Critical reception ==
Rolling Stone ranked the song at No. 184 on its list of the 500 Greatest Songs of All Time, placing it 15th among Beatles songs on that list.

"Please Please Me" was chosen for The Beatles' first national UK television appearance, on Thank Your Lucky Stars on 19 January 1963.

== Covers ==
- In 1963, Fausto Leali released an Italian language version (translated by Dante "Danpa" Panzuti) as a single (Jolly Hi-Fi Records, J 20209). The single was also included on Leali's eponymous 1964 album (Jolly Hi-Fi Records, LPJ 5038).

== Personnel ==
Personnel per Ian MacDonald:

- John Lennon – lead vocals, rhythm guitar, harmonica
- Paul McCartney – harmony vocals, bass
- George Harrison – backing vocals, lead guitar
- Ringo Starr – drums

Production staff

- George Martin – producer
- Norman Smith – engineer

== Charts and certifications ==
=== Weekly charts ===
Chart (1963–64)	Peak position
Australian (Kent Music Report)	36
Canada	5
Ireland (IRMA)	10
Finland (The Official Finnish Charts)	32
Italy (Musica e Dischi)	4
New Zealand (Lever)	2
Sweden (Kvällstoppen)	16
Sweden (Tio i Topp)	7
UK Singles (Official Charts)	2
UK NME	1
UK Melody Maker	1
UK Disc	1
US Billboard Hot 100	3
US Cash Box Top 100	3
West German Media Control	20
WLS-AM survey (Chicago)	2

=== Year-end charts ===
Chart (1964)	Rank
US Billboard Hot 100	16
US Cash Box Top 100	37

=== Certifications ===
Region	Certification	Certified units/sales
United States (RIAA)	Platinum	1,000,000^{‡}
^{‡} Sales+streaming figures based on certification alone.
