= The Beatles timeline =

The Beatles were a rock group from Liverpool, England. This timeline chronicles their activities.

Contents
Pre-1940 · 1940s · 1950s · 1960 · 1961 · 1962 · 1963 · 1964 · 1965 · 1966 · 1967 · 1968 · 1969 · 1970s · 1980s · 1990s · 2000s · 2010s · 2020s
Album and single releases · References · Sources

== Codes ==
Type codes
T	Event type
B	Changes to band line-up/name/business affairs
L	Life events (including births, deaths, weddings and divorces.)
PA	Performance: audition
PC	Performance: concert
PR	Performance: radio broadcast
PT	Performance: TV broadcast
RA	Record release: album
RE	Record release: EP
RF	Film or video release
RG	Video game release
RS	Record release: single
RB	Book release
S	Recording music for record release
SR	Recording music for radio broadcast
V	Recording video (film, TV, video)
O	Other events

Location codes
Event location	L
Canada	CAN
Germany / West Germany	GER
United Kingdom	UK
United States	US
Other	O

== Pre-1940 ==
Date			T	Event	L
1926	Jan	03	L	George Martin is born in Highbury, London.	UK
1933	Feb	18	L	Yoko Ono is born in Tokyo, Japan.	O
1934	Sep	19	L	Brian Epstein is born in Liverpool.	UK
1935	May	27	L	Mal Evans is born in Liverpool.	UK
1938	Apr	29	L	Klaus Voormann is born in Berlin.	GER
1938	May	20	L	Astrid Kirchherr is born in Hamburg.	GER
1939	Sep	10	L	Cynthia Powell (later Lennon) is born in Blackpool.	UK

== 1940s ==
Date			T	Event	L
1940	Jun	23	L	Stuart Sutcliffe is born in Edinburgh, Scotland.	UK
1940	Jul	07	L	Richard Starkey, later known as Ringo Starr, is born at 9 Madryn Street, Dingle, Liverpool.	UK
1940	Oct	09	L	John Lennon is born in the Oxford Street Maternity Hospital, Liverpool.	UK
1941	Sep	24	L	Linda Eastman (later McCartney) is born in New York City.	US
1941	Oct	13	L	Neil Aspinall is born in Prestatyn, Wales.	UK
1941	Nov	24	L	Pete Best is born in Madras, India.	O
1942	Jun	18	L	Paul McCartney is born in the Walton Hospital, Liverpool.	UK
1943	Feb	25	L	George Harrison is born at 12 Arnold Grove, Wavertree, Liverpool.	UK
1944	Mar	17	L	Pattie Boyd (later Harrison) is born in Taunton, Somerset.	UK
1946	Apr	05	L	Jane Asher is born in north-west London.	UK
1946	Aug	04	L	Maureen Cox (later Starkey) is born in Liverpool.	UK
1947	Aug	27	L	Barbara Bach (later Starkey) is born in New York City.	US
1948	May	18	L	Olivia Trinidad Arias (later Harrison) is born in Los Angeles, California.	US

== 1950s ==
Date			T	Event	L
1956	Oct	31	L	McCartney's mother, Mary, dies of breast cancer.	UK
1956	Nov		B	Lennon forms a skiffle group called the Black Jacks with Pete Shotton. The band is later renamed the Quarrymen.	UK
1957	Jun	09	PA	The Quarrymen audition for Carroll Levis's TV Star Search at the Empire Theatre, Liverpool, but do not qualify.	UK
1957	Jul	06	PC	The Quarrymen play at the St Peter's Church garden fête in Liverpool. McCartney and Lennon meet for the first time after being introduced to each other by Ivan Vaughan.	UK
1957	Jul	20	B	McCartney is invited to join the Quarrymen.	UK
1957	Aug	07	PC	The Quarrymen perform at The Cavern Club for the first time.	UK
1957	Oct	18	PC	McCartney's first performance with the Quarrymen at the New Clubmoor Hall, Liverpool.	UK
1958	Feb	06	B	Harrison meets the Quarrymen, and is invited to join despite being younger than the others.	UK
1958	Jul	09	S	The Quarrymen pay 17 shillings and 6 pence to record two songs at a local recording studio in Liverpool, namely "That'll Be the Day" by Buddy Holly and "In Spite of All the Danger" by Harrison and McCartney.	UK
1958	Jul	07	L	Starr celebrates 18th birthday.	UK
1958	Jul	15	L	Lennon's mother, Julia Lennon, is run over and killed by a car driven by an off-duty policeman.	UK
1958	Oct	09	L	Lennon celebrates 18th birthday.	UK
1959	Mar	25	B	Richard "Richie" Starkey is hired as the drummer for "Al Caldwell and his Raving Texans" after being spotted on the Six-Five Special talent TV show. Band members adopt western-sounding stage names, and Starkey becomes Ringo Starr. The band will shortly change its name to Rory Storm and the Hurricanes.	UK
1959	Aug	29	PC	The Quarrymen play at the opening night of the Casbah Club, owned by Best's mother, Mona. The band consists of Lennon, McCartney, Harrison, and Ken Brown, with no drummer.	UK
1959	Oct	10	B	Ken Brown leaves the Quarrymen.	UK
1959	Nov	15	PA	As Johnny and the Moondogs, Lennon, McCartney and Harrison reach the final audition stage of Carroll Levis's TV Star Search at the Empire Theatre, Liverpool. Rory Storm and the Hurricanes with Starr finish 2nd out of 150 acts.	UK

== 1960 ==
Date			T	Event	L
1960	Jan	21	B	Stuart Sutcliffe buys a bass guitar in order to join the Quarrymen.	UK
1960	Apr	23	PC	Lennon and McCartney play McCartney's cousin's pub, The Fox and Hounds, in Caversham, Reading as The Nerk Twins.	UK
1960	May	05	B	The Quarrymen change their name to the Silver Beetles.	UK
1960	May	10	PC	The Silver Beetles audition for Larry Parnes to support Billy Fury on his next tour. They are unsuccessful, but are offered the chance to support Johnny Gentle on a tour of Scotland.	UK
1960	May	14	PC	The Silver Beetles play the Lathom Hall in Liverpool.	UK
1960	May	20	PC	Johnny Gentle's tour, with the Silver Beetles as his backing band, begins at the town hall in Alloa, Scotland.	UK
1960	May	20	B	The Silver Beetles adopt aliases for the duration of the tour: Long John, Paul Ramon, Carl Harrison and Stuart de Staël. Stuart Sutcliffe plays bass and Tommy Moore plays drums.	UK
1960	May	21	PC	The tour continues at the Rescue Hall in Aberdeen.	UK
1960	May	21	PC	The tour continues to the Northern Meeting Ballroom in Inverness.	UK
1960	May	23	PC	The next date is the Dalrymple Hall in Fraserburgh, Aberdeen.	UK
1960	May	25	PC	The tour continues to St Thomas's Hall, Banffshire.	UK
1960	May	26	PC	The next tour date is the town hall in Forres.	UK
1960	May	27	PC	The tour continues at the Regal Ballroom, Nairn.	UK
1960	May	30	PC	The Silver Beetles play at the Jacaranda coffee bar.	UK
1960	Jun	02	PC	The Silver Beetles play the Institute, Neston, Wirral.	UK
1960	Jun	06	PC	The Silver Beetles play at the Grosvenor Ballroom, Liscard, Wirral with Gerry & the Pacemakers.	UK
1960	Jun	11	PC	The Silver Beetles play at the Grosvenor Ballroom, Liscard, Wirral with Gerry & the Pacemakers every Saturday until July 30th.	UK
1960	Jun	13	B	Tommy Moore leaves the Silver Beetles.	UK
1960	Jun	13	PC	The Silver Beetles play the Jacaranda again.	UK
1960	Jun	18	L	McCartney celebrates 18th birthday.	UK
1960	Jun		B	Drummer Norman Chapman is recruited but soon leaves the group, being called up for national service.	UK
1960	Jul	02	PC	The Silver Beetles continue their engagement at the Grosvenor Ballroom. Johnny Gentle joins them for a surprise performance of their Scottish tour repertoire.	UK
1960	Jul	30	PC	The Silver Beetles play at the Grosvenor Ballroom, Liscard, Wirral with Gerry & the Pacemakers for the last time. Further shows at the venue are cancelled due to complaints by locals about noise pollution.	UK
1960	Aug	12	B	Best is hired as drummer for the Silver Beetles.	UK
1960	Aug	17	B	The Silver Beetles change their name to the Beatles.	UK
1960	Aug	17	PC	The Beatles play at the Indra Club in Hamburg for the first time. They play here for the next 48 days.	GER
1960	Oct	04	PC	The Beatles are moved to the Kaiserkeller after complaints about the noise at the Indra Club. They play here, alongside Rory Storm and the Hurricanes, for the next 58 days.	GER
1960	Oct	15	S	At the Akustic Studio in Hamburg, McCartney, Lennon and Harrison perform on a demonstration tape for Lu Walters of Rory Storm and the Hurricanes. Hurricanes' drummer Starr plays for this session, the first time the final line-up of the Beatles record together. "Summertime" is taped and possibly "Fever" and "September Song". None of the recordings are known to have survived.	GER
1960	Nov	21	O	Harrison is deported from Hamburg for being under 18 and lacking a work permit. The Beatles continue without him.	GER
1960	Dec	01	O	McCartney and Best are deported from Hamburg after being accused of arson.	GER
1960	Dec	10	O	Lennon returns from Hamburg.	GER
1960	Dec	27	PC	The Beatles play at Litherland Town Hall, Liverpool with Chas Newby temporarily replacing Stuart Sutcliffe.	UK
1960	Dec	31	PC	The Beatles give a New Year's Eve performance at the Casbah Club.	UK

== 1961 ==
Date			T	Event	L
1961	Jan	05	PC	The Beatles perform at the Town Hall in Litherland, Liverpool. They play various local venues over the next three months.	UK
1961	Feb	09	PC	The Beatles' first lunchtime performance at the Cavern Club.	UK
1961	Feb	25	L	Harrison celebrates 18th birthday.	UK
1961	Mar	11	PC	The "Beatles Farewell Show" takes place at the Aintree Institute, Liverpool. The show goes on all night, concluding at 8 am, and features performances from other Liverpool bands such as Gerry & the Pacemakers and Rory Storm and the Hurricanes.	UK
1961	Apr	01	PC	Another series of shows in Hamburg begins, with the Beatles playing at the Top Ten Club. The band plays every night until 1 July, making a total of 92 appearances at the club. For a portion of this stay in Hamburg, they share the bill with Rory Storm and the Hurricanes.	GER
1961	Jun	22	S	The Beatles, credited as "The Beat Brothers", provide backing music and vocals for the two tracks of Tony Sheridan's My Bonnie single. Three other songs, plus two more by the group alone, are also recorded, all produced by Bert Kaempfert.	GER
1961	Jul	01	O	The Beatles 1-year contract with Kaempfert, signed a few days earlier, starts on this day.	GER
1961	Jul	01	PC	The Beatles' final performance at the Top Ten Club.	GER
1961	Jul	01	B	Stuart Sutcliffe leaves the Beatles. He remains in West Germany and gets engaged to Astrid Kirchherr.	GER
1961	Jul	03	O	The Beatles return to Liverpool.	UK
1961	Jul	06	O	The first edition of Mersey Beat is published, and includes an essay by Lennon about the Beatles.	UK
1961	Jul	07	L	Starr celebrates 21st birthday.	UK
1961	Jul	13	PC	The Beatles' first performance back in England, at St John's Hall, Tuebrook, Liverpool.	UK
1961	Jul	14	PC	The Beatles make another appearance at the Cavern Club, to play both the lunchtime and evening slots. The band plays many local gigs—predominately at the Cavern—in the following months.	UK
1961	Jul	20	O	The Beatles make the front page of Mersey Beat with a story about their contract with Kaempfert.	UK
1961	Jul	26	PC	The Beatles are supported at the Cavern Club by Priscilla White, who would later become Cilla Black.	UK
1961	Aug	31	O	Local DJ Bob Wooler writes an article on the Beatles for Mersey Beat.	UK
1961	Oct	09	L	Lennon celebrates 21st birthday. He and McCartney celebrate by buying bowler hats and hitchhiking to Paris.	UK
1961	Oct	15	PC	The Beatles play a St John Ambulance benefit concert at The Albany, Maghull.	UK
1961	Oct	17	PC	The Beatles' first fan club performance, at the David Lewis Club in Liverpool.	UK
1961	Oct	23	RS	The single "My Bonnie" / "The Saints" released in West Germany.	GER
1961	Oct	28	O	A customer called Raymond Jones enquires about the Beatles' "My Bonnie" single at Epstein's NEMS store, despite the record only being released in West Germany. Epstein promises to find it. Alistair Taylor (Epstein's assistant) later erroneously declared that he used Jones' name to order copies of the record himself.	UK
1961	Oct	30	O	Two more girls enquire about the record which prompts Epstein to order 200 copies of the disc.	UK
1961	Nov	08	O	Epstein books a ticket to see the Beatles at the Cavern Club, citing an "important visit".	UK
1961	Nov	09	PC	Epstein and his assistant Alistair Taylor watch the Beatles perform a lunchtime show at the Cavern Club.	UK
1961	Dec	01	O	The Beatles and Epstein travel to London to meet Colin Borland and Beecher Stevens from Decca Records in the hope of negotiating a recording contract.	UK
1961	Dec	03	O	The Beatles and Bob Wooler meet Epstein at his NEMS store.	UK
1961	Dec	04	O	Deutsche Grammophone representatives meet Epstein in Liverpool to discuss the possibility of releasing "My Bonnie" in the UK.	UK
1961	Dec	06	O	The Beatles meet Epstein at his shop again.	UK
1961	Dec	08	O	Epstein contacts Ron White of EMI in the hope of getting the Beatles a record contract.	UK
1961	Dec	09	O	The Beatles, described as Liverpool's No.1 Rock Outfit Direct from Their German Tour, play The Palais Ballroom, Aldershot, in an advertised Liverpool v London Battle of the Bands, but Ivor Jay & the Jaywalkers do not turn up to the audience of 18.	UK
1961	Dec	10	O	The Beatles and Epstein meet again, this time at the Casbah Coffee Club.	UK
1961	Dec	13	PC	Dick Rowe, head of A&R at Decca, sends Mike Smith to watch the Beatles at the Cavern Club. Smith recommends that Decca set up an audition for the group.	UK
1961	Dec	18	O	Ron White writes to Epstein to inform him that EMI have rejected the Beatles.	UK
1961	Dec	26	PC	The Beatles, wrongly billed as the "Beetles", play at the "Big Beat Ball" at the Tower Ballroom in New Brighton, Merseyside.	UK¸
1961	Dec	27	O	The Beatles organise a Christmas concert at the Cavern Club that features for the first time Starr replacing a sick Pete Best.	UK
1961	Dec	31	O	The Beatles travel to London for an audition with Decca the next day.	UK

== 1962 ==
Date			T	Event	L
1962	Jan	01	PA	The Beatles record 15 songs for an audition at Decca's studio in West Hampstead.	UK
1962	Jan	04	O	The Beatles come out top of the first Mersey Beat poll to find the most popular group, in an issue devoted mainly to them.	UK
1962	Jan	05	RS	"My Bonnie" / "The Saints" released in UK credited to Tony Sheridan and the Beatles, the first time the group's name appear on a record.	UK
1962	Jan	24	O	The Beatles sign a contract to make Epstein their manager.	UK
1962	Jan	26	RE	Polydor France releases "Mister Twist", Tony Sheridan's "My Bonnie" single as an EP, which includes "Cry for a Shadow", the first Beatles original recording ever released.	O
1962	Feb	01	O	The Beatles' management contract (signed on 24 January) officially begins.	UK
1962	Feb	01	PC	Epstein books the Beatles to play at the Thistle Café in West Kirby, Cheshire.	UK
1962	Feb	05	B	For two performances (noon at The Cavern; evening at the Kingsway Club in Southport) Starr fills in as the Beatles' drummer while Best is ill.	UK
1962	Feb	06	O	Epstein meets Dick Rowe and Beecher Stevens of Decca, who inform him that the Beatles were rejected in favour of Brian Poole & the Tremeloes.	UK
1962	Feb	20	O	Epstein writes to Bert Kaempfert, asking him to release the Beatles from the Polydor contract they entered when they recorded with Tony Sheridan.	UK
1962	Mar	07	SR	The Beatles record their appearance on the BBC Light Programme's Teenager's Turn (Here We Go).	UK
1962	Mar	08	PR	The Teenager's Turn (Here We Go) episode the Beatles recorded the previous day is broadcast, the band's radio debut.	UK
1962	Apr	10	L	Stuart Sutcliffe dies of a brain haemorrhage at the age of 21.	GER
1962	Apr	13	PC	The Beatles return to West Germany to play 48 dates at Hamburg's Star-Club.	GER
1962	Apr	23	RS	The "My Bonnie" single is released in the US credited to Tony Sheridan and the Beat Brothers.	US
1962	May	08	O	Epstein visits the HMV store in Oxford Street, where he meets Ted Huntley, who refers him to Ardmore & Beechwood. General manager Sidney Coleman arranges a meeting with EMI producer Martin.	UK
1962	May	09	O	Epstein meets Martin at Abbey Road Studios, and immediately sends a telegram to the Beatles in Hamburg confirming that they have been accepted.	UK
1962	May	24	S	The Beatles, with Roy Young on piano, record "Sweet Georgia Brown" and "Swanee River" still as back up band for Tony Sheridan, not present that day. This is again produced by Bert Kaempfert in order to end their contractual obligations with Polydor Records. "Sweet Georgia Brown" is released in October on a German EP, and the recording of "Swanee River" is lost.	GER
1962	Jun	02	O	The Beatles return to England at the conclusion of their Hamburg contract.	UK
1962	Jun	06	O	The Beatles sign a recording contract with EMI's Parlophone record label, with Martin as their producer. predated 04 June.	UK
1962	Jun	06	S	The Beatles go to Abbey Road Studios for the first time, to make a recording test for Parlophone. They record "Bésame Mucho", "Love Me Do", "P.S. I Love You" and "Ask Me Why". Martin informs Epstein that for future recordings he will use a session drummer in place of Best.	UK
1962	Jun	09	PC	The Beatles play at the Cavern Club again—their first performance there since they last departed for West Germany.	UK
1962	Jun	26	O	Epstein officially forms NEMS Enterprises.	UK
1962	Jun		RA	Tony Sheridan's album "My Bonnie" is released in West Germany which includes the Beatles' recordings of the title song and "The Saints". Credited to their name in small print, it is the first time their name appear on an LP record.	GER
1962	Jul	26	PC	The Beatles support Joe Brown and the Bruvvers at Cambridge Hall, Southport. The concert is promoted by Epstein.	UK
1962	Aug	14	B	Epstein asks Starr to join the band permanently.	UK
1962	Aug	15	PC	Best performs his last show with the Beatles, at the Cavern Club.	UK
1962	Aug	16	B	Lennon, McCartney and Harrison instruct Epstein to inform Best he is no longer in the band. Johnny Hutchinson of The Big Three fills in for him.	UK
1962	Aug	16	PC	The Beatles play at the Riverpark Ballroom in Chester.	UK
1962	Aug	18	B	Starr officially joins the Beatles.	UK
1962	Aug	18	PC	The Beatles play a gig at the Port Sunlight Horticultural Society's annual show in Birkenhead.	UK
1962	Aug	19	O	After Starr's appearance at the Cavern Club, Best fans, upset by his termination, hold vigils outside his house and at the club shouting "Pete forever! Ringo never!" Harrison receives a black eye from one of the upset fans and Epstein temporarily hires a bodyguard to ensure his safety.	UK
1962	Aug	22	V	Granada Television films the Beatles performing at the Cavern Club.	UK
1962	Aug	23	L	Lennon marries Cynthia Powell at the Mount Pleasant Register office in Liverpool.	UK
1962	Sep	04	S	The Beatles' second recording session at Abbey Road Studios, this time Ringo Starr is auditioned by Martin. They record "Love Me Do" and a demo of "How Do You Do It?". This recording of "Love Me Do" is published as the A-side for the original UK single release.	UK
1962	Sep	10	O	Lennon and Harrison buy new guitars from Rushworth and Dreaper's in Liverpool.	UK
1962	Sep	11	B	Andy White plays drums while Starr plays percussion accompaniments on third EMI recording session. This is the only occasion on which a session drummer is used on Beatles recordings.	UK
1962	Sep	11	S	The Beatles record "P.S. I Love You" and "Love Me Do". This recording of the latter will be included on the album. "Please Please Me" is also performed, in a slower tempo, but not recorded; Martin suggests it be reworked.	UK
1962	Oct	01	O	The Beatles sign a new contract with Epstein.	UK
1962	Oct	05	RS	"Love Me Do" / "P.S. I Love You" released, and played on Radio Luxembourg.	UK
1962	Oct	06	O	The Beatles sign copies of their new single at Dawson's Music Shop in Widnes, Cheshire—the first of many such public appearances.	UK
1962	Oct	08	SR	The Beatles make a recording for Radio Luxembourg's The Friday Spectacular at EMI House.	UK
1962	Oct	09	O	The Beatles visit the offices of the Record Mirror in Shaftesbury Avenue, London.	UK
1962	Oct	11	O	"Love Me Do" appears in the listings of favourite songs in Record Retailer.	UK
1962	Oct	12	PC	The Beatles are a support act for Little Richard at the Tower Ballroom in New Brighton.	UK
1962	Oct	17	PT	The Beatles make their television debut on Granada's People and Places.	UK
1962	Oct	25	PR	The Beatles are interviewed for the Cleaver and Clatterbridge Hospital radio station.	UK
1962	Oct	25	SR	The Beatles record their next appearance on the BBC's Here We Go radio programme at the Playhouse Theatre, Manchester.	UK
1962	Oct	26	O	"Love Me Do" enters the UK Singles Chart.	UK
1962	Oct	26	PR	Here We Go is broadcast at 5pm.	UK
1962	Oct	28	PC	The Beatles make their first appearance at the Liverpool Empire Theatre, again supporting Little Richard.	UK
1962	Oct		RE	Polydor Germany releases an EP titled "Ya Ya" credited to Tony Sheridan and the Beat Brothers which includes the song "Sweet Georgia Brown" recorded with the Beatles on their second and last recording session with Bert Kaempfert.	GER
1962	Nov	01	PC	The Beatles begin a 2-week run at Hamburg's Star-Club.	GER
1962	Nov	07	PR	The Beatles appear in another episode of Granada's People and Places.	UK
1962	Nov	15	O	The Beatles return to England.	UK
1962	Nov	16	O	The Beatles visit the offices of Disc, a music paper.	UK
1962	Nov	16	SR	The Beatles record a piece for The Friday Spectacular on Radio Luxembourg.	UK
1962	Nov	17	V	The Beatles make another recording for People and Places.	UK
1962	Nov	26	S	The Beatles record their second single, "Please Please Me" / "Ask Me Why".	UK
1962	Nov	30	S	The Beatles attend another recording session to finish the "Please Please Me" single.	UK
1962	Dec	02	SR	The Beatles record an appearance on BBC Light Programme's The Talent Spot.	UK
1962	Dec	04	PR	The Talent Spot is broadcast at 5pm.	UK
1962	Dec	04	PR	The Beatles appear live on Associated-Rediffusion's Tuesday Rendezvous from the Wembley television studios.	UK
1962	Dec	13	PR	The Beatles' appearance on People and Places is broadcast.	UK
1962	Dec	17	PC	Epstein takes producer Martin to watch one of the Beatles' regular shows at the Cavern Club.	UK
1962	Dec	18	PC	Due to an existing contract, the Beatles travel to Hamburg to play 12 more dates at the Star-Club. A bootleg recording of one of those evenings is released in 1977 under the title "Live! at the Star-Club in Hamburg, Germany; 1962".	GER
1962	Dec	31	L	Heather See is born in Tucson, Arizona, to Linda and Joseph See. In 1969, she will be adopted by Paul McCartney following his marriage to her mother.	US

== 1963 ==
Date			T	Event	L
1963	Jan	11	RS	"Please Please Me" / "Ask Me Why" released in Europe.	UK
1963	Feb	07	RS	"Please Please Me" / "Ask Me Why" released in the U.S.A. by Vee-Jay Records.	US
1963	Feb	11	S	The Beatles record the 10 remaining tracks for their first album Please Please Me.	UK
1963	Feb	18	RS	"Love Me Do" (with Starr on drums) / "P.S. I Love You" released in Canada. Only 170 copies are sold.	CAN
1963	Mar	22	RA	The Please Please Me album released.	UK
1963	Mar	31	PC	The Beatles perform at the De Montfort Hall, Leicester.	UK
1963	Apr	08	L	Julian Lennon is born in Liverpool to John and Cynthia Lennon.	UK
1963	Apr	11	RS	"From Me to You" / "Thank You Girl" released.	UK
1963	Apr	18	PR	The Beatles play at the BBC Light Programme concert "Swinging Sounds 63" at the Royal Albert Hall in London.	UK
1963	Apr	27	RS	"Love Me Do" / "P.S. I Love You" released on Tollie records.	US
1963	May	27	RS	"From Me to You" / "Thank You Girl" released by Vee-Jay Records.	US
1963	Jun	18	L	McCartney celebrates 21st birthday.	UK
1963	Jul	12	RE	Twist and Shout released.	UK
1963	Jul	12	RE	Tony Sheridan With The Beatles – My Bonnie released by Polydor.	GER
1963	Aug	03	L	Kyoko Chan Cox is born in Japan to Yoko Ono and Anthony Cox.	O
1963	Aug	23	RS	"She Loves You" / "I'll Get You" released.	UK
1963	Sep	06	RE	The Beatles' Hits released.	UK
1963	Sep	16	RS	"She Loves You" / "I'll Get You" released by Swan Records.	US
1963	Oct	13	PT	The Beatles' performance on ITV's weekly televised musical variety show Val Parnell's Sunday Night at the London Palladium launches Beatlemania for Beatle publicist Tony Barrow.	UK
1963	Oct	23	O	The Beatles fly to Sweden for a seven-day tour to five cities, their first international tour as a famous group.	O
1963	Oct	24	PR	The Beatles do a live radio recording with audience at Karlaplansstudion in Stockholm, Sweden for Sveriges Radio.	O
1963	Oct	25	PC	The Beatles do two 25-minute shows at Sundsta Läroverk in Karlstad, Sweden.	O
1963	Oct	26	PC	The Beatles do two 25-minute shows at Kungliga tennishallen in Stockholm, Sweden.	O
1963	Oct	27	PC	The Beatles do three 25-minute shows at Lorensbergs Cirkus in Gothenburg, Sweden.	O
1963	Oct	28	PC	The Beatles do a single 25-minute show at Boråshallen in Borås, Sweden.	O
1963	Oct	29	PC	The Beatles do a single 25-minute show at Sporthallen in Eskilstuna, Sweden.	O
1963	Oct	30	PT	The Beatles do their first international TV performance in the SVT music show Drop In in Stockholm, Sweden.	O
1963	Oct	31	O	The Beatles fly back to London from Sweden and are met at London Airport by 10,000 fans.	O
1963	Nov	01	RE	The Beatles (No. 1) released.	UK
1963	Nov	04	PC	The Beatles play a Royal Command Performance at the Prince of Wales Theatre in London, in the presence of The Queen Mother, Princess Margaret and Lord Snowdon.	UK
1963	Nov	22	RA	With the Beatles released.	UK
1963	Nov	25	RA	Beatlemania! With the Beatles released by Capitol Records of Canada, the first Beatles album published in North America.	CAN
1963	Nov	29	RS	"I Want to Hold Your Hand" / "This Boy" released.	UK
1963	Dec	01	PC	Beatles perform for the 2nd time at the De Montfort Hall, Leicester.	UK
1963	Dec	09	RS	"Roll Over Beethoven" / "Please Mister Postman" released.	CAN
1963	Dec	26	RS	"I Want to Hold Your Hand" / "I Saw Her Standing There" released by Capitol Records.	US

== 1964 ==
Date			T	Event	L
1964	Jan	03	RS	"Please Please Me" / "From Me to You" released.	US
1964	Jan	10	RA	Introducing... The Beatles released by Vee-Jay Records.	US
1964	Jan	16	PC	The Beatles start an 18-day residency at the Olympia in Paris which ends on February 4th.	O
1964	Jan	20	RA	Meet the Beatles! released.	US
1964	Jan	29	S	The Beatles record in Paris the German single "Komm, gib mir deine Hand / Sie liebt dich" and "Can't Buy Me Love", their only recording session outside of England for EMI.	O
1964	Feb	01	O	I Want To Hold Your Hand reaches #1 on the Billboard charts.	US
1964	Feb	03	RA	Twist and Shout released.	CAN
1964	Feb	03	RA	The Beatles with Tony Sheridan & Guests released by MGM Records.	US
1964	Feb	07	RE	All My Loving released.	UK
1964	Feb	07	O	The Beatles arrive at John F. Kennedy International Airport in New York.	US
1964	Feb	09	PT	The Beatles make their first appearance on The Ed Sullivan Show.	US
1964	Feb	11	PC	The Beatles make their first US live performance at the Washington Coliseum.	US
1964	Feb	12	PC	The Beatles perform at Carnegie Hall in New York.	US
1964	Feb	16	PT	The Beatles make their second appearance on The Ed Sullivan Show from Miami.	US
1964	Feb	23	PT	The Beatles make their third appearance on The Ed Sullivan Show prerecorded the week before.	US
1964	Feb	25	L	Harrison celebrates 21st birthday.	UK
1964	Feb	28	RS	"Why" / "Cry for a Shadow" released by Polydor Records.	UK
1964	Mar	02	RS	"Twist and Shout" / "There's a Place" released.	US
1964	Mar	02	V	A Hard Day's Night begins filming.	UK
1964	Mar	05	RS	"Komm, gib mir deine Hand / Sie liebt dich" released in West Germany by EMI's Odeon Records.	GER
1964	Mar	09	RS	"All My Loving" / "This Boy" released.	CAN
1964	Mar	16	RS	"Can't Buy Me Love" / "You Can't Do That" released.	US
1964	Mar	23	RE	Souvenir of Their Visit to America released by Vee-Jay Records.	US
1964	Mar	23	RS	"Do You Want to Know a Secret" / "Thank You Girl" released.	US
1964	Apr		RA	The Beatles' First! released by Polydor Records.	GER
1964	Apr	10	RA	The Beatles' Second Album released.	US
1964	Apr	19	PT	Around the Beatles is aired.	UK
1964	Apr	27	RS	"Love Me Do" / "P.S. I Love You" released.	US
1964	May	11	RA	The Beatles' Long Tall Sally released.	CAN
1964	May	11	RE	Four by the Beatles released.	US
1964	May	21	RS	"Sie Liebt Dich" / "I'll Get You" released by Swan Records.	US
1964	May	29	RS	"Ain't She Sweet" / "If You Love Me, Baby" released by Atco Records.	UK
1964	Jun	01	RS	"Sweet Georgia Brown" / "Take Out Some Insurance on Me, Baby" released by Atco.	US
1964	Jun	3	B	After a photoshoot, Ringo Starr is taken to the hospital, suffering from tonsillitis.	UK
1964	Jun	4	B	Drummer Jimmie Nicol is hired to replace Starr for a tour that starts this day in Copenhagen, Denmark and will pass through Australasia before continuing in Europe.	UK
1964	Jun	14	B	Ringo Starr returns behind his drum kit in Melbourne, Australia.	O
1964	Jun	19	RE	Long Tall Sally released.	UK
1964	Jun	26	RA	A Hard Day's Night released by United Artists Records.	US
1964	Jul	06	RF	A Hard Day's Night released.	UK
1964	Jul	06	RS	"Ain't She Sweet" / "Nobody's Child" released by Polydor.	UK
1964	Jul	10	RA	A Hard Day's Night released.	UK
1964	Jul	10	RS	"A Hard Day's Night" / "Things We Said Today" released.	UK
1964	Jul	13	RS	"A Hard Day's Night" / "I Should Have Known Better" released.	US
1964	Jul	20	RA	Something New released.	US
1964	Jul	20	RS	"And I Love Her" / "If I Fell" released.	US
1964	Aug	19	PC	The Beatles start first full-length North American tour at the Cow Palace in San Francisco.	US
1964	Aug	20	RS	"I'll Cry Instead" / "I'm Happy Just to Dance with You" released.	UK
1964	Aug	24	RS	"Matchbox" / "Slow Down" released.	UK
1964	Oct	05	RA	Ain't She Sweet released by Atco.	US
1964	Oct	10	PC	Beatles perform for the 3rd and last time at the De Montfort Hall, Leicester.	UK
1964	Nov	04	RE	Extracts from the Film A Hard Day's Night released.	UK
1964	Nov	06	RE	Extracts from the Album A Hard Day's Night released.	UK
1964	Nov	23	RA	The Beatles' Story released.	US
1964	Nov	23	RS	"I Feel Fine" / "She's a Woman" released.	US
1964	Nov	27	RS	"I Feel Fine" / "She's a Woman" released.	UK
1964	Dec	04	RA	Beatles for Sale released.	UK
1964	Dec	04	RS	"If I Fell" / "Tell Me Why" released.	UK
1964	Dec	15	RA	Beatles '65 released.	US

== 1965 ==
Date			T	Event	L
1965	Jan	31	RS	"Sweet Georgia Brown" / "Nobody's Child" (Sheridan's solo version) released by Polydor Records.	GER
1965	Feb	01	RE	4-by the Beatles released.	US
1965	Feb	11	L	Starr and Cox marry.	UK
1965	Feb	15	RS	"Eight Days a Week" / "I Don't Want to Spoil the Party" released.	US
1965	Mar	22	RA	The Early Beatles released.	US
1965	Apr	06	RE	Beatles for Sale (EP) released.	UK
1965	Apr	09	RS	"Ticket to Ride" / "Yes It Is" released.	UK
1965	Jun	04	RE	Beatles for Sale No. 2 released.	UK
1965	Jun	14	RA	Beatles VI released.	US
1965	Jul	23	RS	"Help!" / "I'm Down" released.	UK
1965	Jul	29	RF	Help! the film released.	UK
1965	Aug	06	RA	Help! the album released.	UK
1965	Aug	13	RA	Help! the album released.	US
1965	Aug	15	PC	The Beatles perform at Shea Stadium to a record-breaking crowd.	US
1965	Sep	13	RS	"Yesterday" / "Act Naturally" released.	US
1965	Sep	13	L	Zak Starkey is born to Ringo Starr and Maureen Starkey.	UK
1965	Sep	25	RF	"The Beatles" cartoon series premieres on ABC.	US
1965	Oct	11	RS	"Roll Over Beethoven" / "Misery" released.	UK
1965	Oct	11	RS	"Boys" / Medley: "Kansas City"/"Hey, Hey, Hey, Hey" released.	UK
1965	Oct	26	L	The Beatles receive MBE.	UK
1965	Dec	03	RA	Rubber Soul released.	UK
1965	Dec	03	RS	"We Can Work It Out" / "Day Tripper" released.	UK
1965	Dec	06	RE	The Beatles' Million Sellers released.	UK

== 1966 ==
Date			T	Event	L
1966	Jan	21	L	Harrison marries Pattie Boyd at the Leatherhead and Esher Registry Office, with McCartney and Epstein as best men.	UK
1966	Feb	15	RS	"Nowhere Man" / "What Goes On" released.	US
1966	Mar	04	RE	Yesterday released.	UK
1966	Apr	06	S	The Beatles start recording sessions for their album Revolver and "Paperback Writer" / "Rain" single. These sessions end on 22 June 1966.	UK
1966	May	01	RF	The Beatles at Shea Stadium released.	UK
1966	May	16	RA	The Beach Boys' Pet Sounds released.	US
1966	May	27	V	Lennon and Bob Dylan film the limousine scene for Dylan's film Eat the Document.	UK
1966	May	30	RS	"Paperback Writer" / "Rain" released.	US
1966	Jun	10	RS	"Paperback Writer" / "Rain" released.	UK
1966	Jun	15	RA	Yesterday and Today released.	US
1966	Jun	27	RA	The Beach Boys' Pet Sounds released.	UK
1966	Jul	08	RE	Nowhere Man released.	UK
1966	Jul	15	O	More popular than Jesus remark sparks wild reactions in southeast US.	US
1966	Aug	05	RA	Revolver released.	UK
1966	Aug	05	RS	"Yellow Submarine" / "Eleanor Rigby" released.	UK
1966	Aug	08	RA	Revolver released.	US
1966	Aug	29	PC	The Beatles play their final paid concert at Candlestick Park in San Francisco.	US
1966	Nov	09	L	John Lennon meets Yoko Ono at the Indica Gallery	UK
1966	Nov	24	S	The Beatles start recording sessions for their album Sgt. Pepper's Lonely Hearts Club Band and "Strawberry Fields Forever" / "Penny Lane" single. These sessions end on 21 April 1967.	UK
1966	Dec	09	RA	A Collection of Beatles Oldies released.	UK

== 1967 ==
Date			T	Event	L
1967	Jan	26	B	Without a contract since June 3, 1966, Beatles sign a new nine year contract with Parlophone.	UK
1967	Feb	13	RS	"Strawberry Fields Forever" / "Penny Lane" released.	US
1967	Feb	17	RS	"Strawberry Fields Forever" / "Penny Lane" released.	UK
1967	Apr	19	B	Apple Corps is formed.	UK
1967	May	26	RA	Sgt. Pepper's Lonely Hearts Club Band released.	UK
1967	Jun	25	PT	Live taping of "All You Need Is Love" for Our World global broadcast.	UK
1967	Jul	07	RS	"All You Need Is Love" / "Baby, You're a Rich Man" released.	UK
1967	Aug	04	RA	The Beatles' First released.	UK
1967	Aug	19	L	Jason Starkey is born to Ringo Starr and Maureen Starkey.	UK
1967	Aug	25	L	The Beatles and their wives go to Bangor, Wales to attend a seminar by the Maharishi Mahesh Yogi.	UK
1967	Aug	27	L	Epstein found dead in his London home. After hearing the news, the Beatles leave the seminar.	UK
1967	Nov	24	RS	"Hello, Goodbye" / "I Am the Walrus" released.	UK
1967	Nov	27	RA	Magical Mystery Tour (album) released.	US
1967	Dec	08	RE	Magical Mystery Tour (EP) released.	UK
1967	Dec	26	RF	Magical Mystery Tour broadcast.	UK

== 1968 ==
Date			T	Event	L
1968	Jan	12	L	Heather Mills is born in Aldershot, Hampshire.	UK
1968	Feb	15	O	The Harrisons and Lennons leave London on their way to Rishikesh, India, for a retreat with the Maharishi.	O
1968	Feb	19	O	McCartney, Asher, and the Starrs fly from London to Rishikesh.	O
1968	Mar	1	O	The Starrs leave the Rishikesh retreat much earlier than expected; they miss their children and Ringo is unhappy with the food.	O
1968	Mar	15	RS	"Lady Madonna" / "The Inner Light" released.	UK
1968	Mar	mid	O	McCartney and Asher leave the Rishikesh retreat.	O
1968	Apr	12	O	The Harrisons and Lennons leave the Rishikesh retreat amid a controversy about the behaviour of the Maharishi.	O
1968	May	11	O	McCartney and Lennon begin a four-day trip to New York for the public unveiling of the Beatles new business venture, Apple Corps.	US
1968	May	28	S	The Beatles begin a two-day recording session, the so-called Kinfauns demos, at George Harrison's house in preparation for their next album.	UK
1968	May	30	S	The Beatles start recording sessions for their self-titled double album, also known as the "White Album", and the "Hey Jude" / "Revolution" single. These recording sessions end on 14 October.	UK
1968	Jun	08	O	John Lennon meets Harry Nilsson at Kenwood.	UK
1968	Jul	17	RF	The Yellow Submarine movie is released.	UK
1968	Jul	28	O	"Mad Day Out" photo shoot.	UK
1968	Jul	31	B	The Apple Boutique closes down.	UK
1968	Aug	17	RB	The Beatles: The Authorised Biography by Hunter Davies published	UK
1968	Aug	22	B	Ringo Starr quits the group but returns two weeks later.	UK
1968	Aug	26	RS	"Hey Jude" / "Revolution" released.	US
1968	Aug	30	RS	"Hey Jude" / "Revolution" released.	UK
1968	Nov	08	L	John and Cynthia Lennon's divorce is completed with the granting of their decree nisi.	UK
1968	Nov	22	RA	The Beatles is released.	UK

== 1969 ==
Date			T	Event	L
1969	Jan	02	S	The Beatles start the sessions for "Let It Be", their last album to be issued. They are filmed and recorded by Michael Lindsay-Hogg for a documentary. The bulk of these recording sessions end on the 31.	UK
1969	Jan	10	B	George Harrison quits the group but returns a few days later.	UK
1969	Jan	13	RA	Yellow Submarine released.	UK
1969	Jan	22	B	Billy Preston is invited to join the group as a temporary keyboard player.	UK
1969	Jan	30	PC	The Beatles give their final public performance on the rooftop of the Apple offices on Savile Row. Joined by Billy Preston, they play nine songs in forty-two minutes, including repeats of three songs.	UK
1969	Mar	12	L	McCartney marries Linda Eastman at the Marylebone Registry Office.	UK
1969	Mar	20	L	Lennon marries Yoko Ono in Gibraltar.	O
1969	Apr	11	RS	"Get Back" / "Don't Let Me Down" released.	UK
1969	Apr	14	S	Lennon and McCartney record "The Ballad of John and Yoko" while Harrison and Starr are absent.	UK
1969	Apr	16	S	Recording Harrison's "Old Brown Shoe" which is completed two days later.	UK
1969	Apr	30	S	Recording new guitar solo for the single version of "Let It Be" then vocals and sound effects for "You Know My Name (Look Up The Number)".	UK
1969	May	30	RS	"The Ballad of John and Yoko" / "Old Brown Shoe" released.	UK
1969	Jul	01	S	The Beatles officially start the sessions for Abbey Road, their last album to be recorded. These recording sessions end on 19 August.	UK
1969	Jul	01	O	John Lennon, Yoko Ono and their children Julian and Kyoko are in a car accident in Golspie, north Scotland.	UK
1969	Jul	09	S	John Lennon returns to the studio after his recuperation period from his accident.	UK
1969	Aug	20	S	Final time the four Beatles are in the studio together, mixing and editing "I Want You (She's So Heavy)".	UK
1969	Aug	22	O	The Beatles' final photo shoot at Tittenhurst Park, John Lennon's estate.	UK
1969	Aug	28	L	Mary McCartney is born in London to Paul and Linda McCartney.	UK
1969	Sep	01	B	Allen Klein negotiates a new contract with Parlophone.	UK
1969	Sep	13	PC	After last-minute arrangements, the Plastic Ono Band performs at the Toronto Rock and Roll Revival. This version of the band includes Lennon, Ono, Eric Clapton, Klaus Voormann, and Alan White. The performance is recorded and later released as Live Peace in Toronto 1969.	CAN
1969	Sep	20	B	In a meeting to sign a new recording contract negotiated by Allen Klein, Lennon tells McCartney and Starr (Harrison was not present) that he is leaving the Beatles.	UK
1969	Sep	26	RA	Abbey Road released.	UK
1969	Oct	31	RS	"Something" / "Come Together" released.	UK
1969	Nov	04	RA	Very Together released.	CAN
1969	Nov	06	O	Lennon shaved off his beard at Yoko's request.	UK
1969	Dec	12	RA	No One's Gonna Change Our World released with "Across the Universe" as the opening track.	UK

== 1970s ==
Date			T	Event	L
1970	Jan	03	S	"I Me Mine" is recorded by Harrison, McCartney and Starr.	UK
1970	Jan	04	S	To complete the recording of "Let It Be", extra drums by Starr, a more rock-sounding guitar solo by Harrison and new backup vocals by him, McCartney and his wife Linda are dubbed. An orchestral score by George Martin is also recorded during this last group session, albeit without Lennon.	UK
1970	Jan	08	S	George Harrison records a new vocal track for "For You Blue" at Olympic Studios.	UK
1970	Feb	04	O	John Lennon and Yoko Ono donate a bag of their hair to Michael X.	UK
1970	Feb	26	RA	Hey Jude compilation album is released.	US
1970	Feb		RA	Nilsson's Nilsson Sings Newman album released.	US
1970	Mar	06	RS	"Let It Be" / "You Know My Name (Look Up the Number)" released.	UK
1970	Mar	12	L	George and Pattie Harrison move out of Kinfauns into their new home, Friar Park.	UK
1970	Mar	17	L	Ringo and Maureen, Paul and Linda, John and Yoko attend Pattie Harrison’s birthday party	UK
1970	Mar	27	RA	Sentimental Journey is released.	UK
1970	Apr	01	S	Orchestral overdubs by Phil Spector for "Across The Universe", "The Long And Winding Road" and "I Me Mine" are recorded while Starr sits in to redo his drum parts. This is the last time new recordings are made for the group until the mid 1990s.	UK
1970	Apr	10	B	In a press release, McCartney announces he is leaving the Beatles.	UK
1970	Apr	17	RA	McCartney is released.	UK
1970	May	04	RA	In the Beginning (Circa 1960) is released.	US
1970	May	08	RA	Let It Be album is released.	UK
1970	May	11	RS	"The Long and Winding Road" / "For You Blue" is released.	US
1970	May	20	RF	Let It Be film is released.	UK
1970	Sep	25	RA	Beaucoups of Blues is released.	UK
1970	Nov	17	L	Lee Starkey is born to Ringo Starr and Maureen Starkey.	UK
1970	Nov	27	RA	All Things Must Pass released.	UK
1970	Dec	11	RA	John Lennon/Plastic Ono Band and Yoko Ono/Plastic Ono Band is released.	UK
1970	Dec	18	RA	From Then to You is released.	UK
1970	Dec	18	RA	The Beatles' Christmas Album is released.	US
1970	Dec	24	B	John Lennon gives a deposition in the "Come Together" lawsuit.	UK
1970	Dec	26	O	"My Sweet Lord" / "Isn't It a Pity" reach No. 1 on the Billboard Hot 100, making George the first member of the band to do so.	US
1970	Dec	31	B	McCartney files suit to dissolve the Beatles partnership.	UK
1970	Dec		RA	Nilsson's The Point! album released.	US
1971	Feb		S	Paul and Linda McCartney recorded the Ram song "Too Many People", the song was aimed at John Lennon and Yoko Ono, George Harrison.	US
1971	Mar	18	B	Bright Tunes Music Corp. sued Harrisongs Music, Ltd. due to the similarity of Harrison's "My Sweet Lord" to the Chiffons' "He's So Fine".	US
1971	May	12	L	Paul and Linda McCartney, as well as Ringo Starr and Maureen Starkey, attend the wedding of Mick Jagger and Bianca Pérez-Mora Macías.	UK
1971	Jul	16	V	John Lennon and Yoko Ono film material for their feature film, Imagine.	UK
1971	May	15	O	Lennon and Ono attended the Cannes Film Festival.	O
1971	May	17	RA	The McCartney's Ram released.	UK
1971	May	26	S	John Lennon records the Imagine song "How Do You Sleep?"; the song was aimed at McCartney with a slide guitar solo by Harrison.	UK
1971	Jun	06	O	John Lennon and Yoko Ono meet the musician David Peel in New York City.	US
1971	Jun	06	O	John Lennon and Yoko Ono meet Andy Warhol.	US
1971	Jun	07	PC	Lennon and Ono perform with Frank Zappa and the Mothers of Invention.	US
1971	Jun		RA	Nilsson's Aerial Pandemonium Ballet album released.	US
1971	Jul		B	Paul and Linda form the band Wings with Denny Laine and Denny Seiwell.	UK
1971	Aug	12	O	John Lennon and Yoko Ono flew from London to New York City; Lennon will stay in New York up until his death in 1980.	US
1971	Sep	08	V	John Lennon and Yoko Ono appeared on The Dick Cavett Show.	US
1971	Sep	09	RA	Imagine released.	US
1971	Sep	12	V	John Lennon and Yoko Ono finish filming material for their feature film, Imagine.	US
1971	Sep	13	L	Stella McCartney is born in London to Paul and Linda McCartney.	UK
1971	Sep	21	RA	Yoko's Fly released.	UK
1971	Sep	29	RA	Yoko's "Mrs. Lennon" / "Midsummer New York" single is released.	UK
1971	Oct	08	RA	Imagine is released.	UK
1971	Oct	16	S	Paul records the Wild Life song "Dear Friend"; the song was reconciliatory gesture towards John.	UK
1971	Nov	11	RA	Nilsson's Nilsson Schmilsson album released.	US
1971	Dec	01	RS	"Happy Xmas (War Is Over)" / "Listen, the Snow Is Falling" single is released.	UK
1971	Dec	10	PC	Lennon and Ono perform at the John Sinclair Freedom Rally, held at the Crisler Arena in Ann Arbor, Michigan.	US
1972	Jan	06	B	John Lennon and Yoko Ono register the company Joko Films Ltd.	UK
1972	Jan	24	B	Henry McCullough joins Wings.	UK
1972	Mar	06	B	John Lennon and Yoko Ono receive a notice of deportation from the United States	US
1972	Mar	17	RS	"Back Off Boogaloo" single is released.	UK
1972	Apr	18	B	John Lennon and Yoko Ono attend their first US Immigration hearing	US
1972	Apr	24	RS	"Woman Is the Nigger of the World" single is released.	US
1972	May	01	B	John Lennon deportation from the United States is halted.	US
1972	May	02	B	John Lennon is granted permission to apply for permanent residency in the United States.	US
1972	May	03	V	John Lennon and Yoko Ono appear on The Dick Cavett Show, performed their forthcoming single, "Woman Is the Nigger of the World", as well as "We're All Water", backed by "Elephant's Memory".	US
1972	May	12	B	John Lennon and Yoko Ono attend their second US Immigration hearing.	US
1972	May	17	B	John Lennon and Yoko Ono attend their third US Immigration hearing.	US
1972	Jun	12	RA	The Lennons' Some Time in New York City released.	US
1972	Jul	10	RA	Nilsson's Son of Schmilsson album released.	US
1972	Jul	28	RA	Nilsson's Son of Schmilsson album released.	UK
1972	Nov	08	O	John Lennon and Yoko Ono attended a US election party at the apartment of Jerry Rubin.	US
1972	Nov	13	RA	Yoko's "Now or Never" / "Move on Fast" single is released	UK
1972	Nov	24	RS	The "Happy Xmas (War Is Over)" / "Listen, the Snow Is Falling" single is released	UK
1972	Dec	23	RF	The Imagine film has its US première.	US
1973	Jan		O	John Lennon and Yoko Ono attended a post-election party at the apartment of Jerry Rubin.	US
1973	Jan	08	RA	Yoko's Approximately Infinite Universe is released.	US
1973	Feb	10	B	Lennon and McCartney's songwriting contract with music publishers Northern Songs expires.	US
1973	Mar	05	S	McCartney recorded additional vocals, including a kazoo-like solo in Apple Studios for Starr's Ringo album to record "You're Sixteen".	US
1973	Mar	13	S	Three ex-Beatles are in Sunset Sound in Hollywood for Starr's Ringo album to record "I'm the Greatest" written by Lennon. Klaus Voormann plays bass and Billy Preston is on keyboards.	US
1973	Mar	23	B	Lennon was ordered to leave the United States within 60 days.	US
1973	Mar	28	S	Paul and Linda McCartney are in Apple Studios for Starr's Ringo album to record "Six O’Clock" written by The McCartneys.	US
1973	Mar	30	B	John Lennon lodge an appeal against his deportment from the United States.	US
1973	Mar	31	B	Lennon, Harrison, and Starr end their management contract with Allen Klein.	US
1973	Apr	09	O	Lennon, Ono, Harrison and Starr attend Capitol Records party.	US
1973	Apr	19	RA	Greatest hits double albums 1962–1966 and 1967–1970 are released.	UK
1973	Jun		RA	Nilsson's A Little Touch of Schmilsson in the Night album released.	US
1973	Jun		L	At the suggestion of Yoko Ono, Lennon starts a relationship with his 22-year-old Chinese American assistant, May Pang.	UK
1973	Jun	22	O	"My Love" reached No. 1 on the Billboard Hot 100 for four weeks, making Paul the second member of the band to do so.	US
1973	Jul	03	B	A lawsuit against John Lennon was served by Allen Klein's company ABKCO.	US
1973	Aug		B	Henry McCullough and Denny Seiwell leave Wings.	UK
1973	Sep	18	O	John Lennon and May fly from New York City to Los Angeles.	US
1973	Oct	12	B	John Lennon's lawsuit with Big Seven Music Corp is formally settled.	US
1973	Oct	24	V	A promotional film for John Lennon's Mind Games album is filmed.	US
1973	Oct	29	RA	Mind Games is released.	US
1973	Oct	29	RS	"Mind Games" single is released.	US
1973	Nov	01	B	John Lennon, George Harrison, and Ringo Starr launched a lawsuit against Allen Klein and his ABKCO company in London’s High Court.	US
1973	Nov	02	RA	Feeling the Space is released, being Yoko's last album to be released on Apple Records.	US
1973	Nov	02	RA	Ringo is released	US
1973	Nov	08	B	Lennon, Harrison, and Starr are countersued by Klein, included Ono and various Beatles-related companies as defendants.	US
1973	Nov	16	RA	Mind Games released.	UK
1973	Nov	16	RS	"Mind Games" single is released.	UK
1973	Nov	24	O	"Photograph" reached No. 1 on the Billboard Hot 100, making Ringo the third member of the band to do so.	US
1973	Nov	30	RA	Band on the Run released, being Paul McCartney and/or Wings' last album to be released on Apple Records.	US
1973	Dec	03	RS	"You're Sixteen" single is released.	US
1974	Jan	30	PC	John and Yoko watch Bob Dylan perform at Madison Square Garden, his first for eight years. Also in attendance are Paul Simon, Jack Nicholson, Allen Ginsberg, and David Geffen.	US
1973	Feb	08	RS	"You're Sixteen" single is released.	US
1973	Feb	18	RS	"Oh My My" single is released.	US
1974	Mar	03	O	John Lennon and Ringo Starr jam at the Record Plant; this was a meeting of the drinking group known as the Jim Keltner Fan Club.	US
1974	Mar	21	O	John Lennon attended the musical "The Rocky Horror Show" in Los Angeles.	US
1974	Mar	24	O	John Lennon and the Rolling Stones' Mick Jagger jam at the Record Plant; this was a meeting of the Jim Keltner Fan Club.	US
1974	Mar	27	O	John and May move into a Santa Monica beach house.	US
1974	Mar	28	S	John and Paul reunite in Burbank Studios during the first night of Harry Nilsson's Pussy Cats album sessions for an impromptu jam session, also a meeting as the Jim Keltner Fan Club.	US
1974	Mar	29	L	Paul and Linda pay a visit to the Santa Monica house rented by John Lennon.	US
1974	Apr	01	RA	Nilsson's Son of Dracula soundtrack album is released.	US
1974	Apr	06	B	Paul, Linda, and Ringo visit John Lennon in Santa Monica; they discuss various matters related to Beatles and Apple Corps.	US
1974	Apr	19	O	Ringo Starr and Harry Nilsson attend the premiere of the film Son Of Dracula in Atlanta, Georgia.	US
1974	Apr	28	O	John Lennon and Harry Nilsson attend a "The March of Dimes Walkathon" protest rally in New York City.	US
1974	May		B	George Harrison forms his own record label, Dark Horse Records.	US
1974	May		B	Ringo Starr forms his own record label, Ring O' Records.	US
1974	May	24	RA	Nilsson's Son of Dracula soundtrack album is released.	UK
1974	Jul	03	L	Harrison and Pattie Boyd split up.	UK
1974	Jul	17	B	Lennon is ordered to leave the United States within 60 days; Leon Wildes lodges an appeal on his behalf.	US
1974	Aug	06	S	John Lennon records three songs for Starr's Goodnight Vienna album to record "It's All Down To) Goodnight Vienna" and its Reprise written by Lennon, and a Lennon-suggested cover of "Only You".	US
1974	Aug	10	PC	Yoko starts her solo first full-length concert tour in Japan.	O
1974	Aug	19	RA	Nilsson's Pussy Cats album released.	US
1974	Aug	23	O	Lennon and May Pang se an unidentified flying object over New York City.	US
1974	Aug	26	B	Lennon attends US immigration hearing.	US
1974	Aug	31	S	Elton John joins the Walls and Bridges studio sessions, added an organ part and sang vocals with Lennon for "Whatever Gets You Thru The Night". Elton bets if the song makes it to number one, Lennon will join him on stage to perform it at a Thanksgiving concert.	US
1974	Sep	07	O	The first Beatlefest opens in New York City.	US
1974	Sep	20	O	Lennon meets David Bowie at a party.	US
1974	Sep	23	RS	"Whatever Gets You Thru the Night" single is released.	US
1974	Sep	26	RA	Walls and Bridges is released.	US
1974	Oct	04	RS	"Whatever Gets You Thru the Night" single is released.	UK
1974	Oct	08	B	John Lennon discusses Big Seven lawsuit with Maurice Levy.	US
1974	Oct	17	V	Footage is filmed for a promotional clip for John Lennon's single "Whatever Gets You Thru the Night".	US
1974	Oct	18	B	John Lennon discusses Roots album with Maurice Levy.	US
1974	Oct	24	O	John Lennon visits "Hell's Kitchen" for a photoshoot in New York City.	US
1974	Nov	9	V	Ringo begins filming his commercial for Goodnight Vienna and the promotional video for "Only You" at Capitol Records in Los Angeles with Harry Nilsson.	US
1974	Nov	11	RS	"Only You (And You Alone)" single is released.	US
1974	Nov	15	RS	"Only You (And You Alone)" single is released.	UK
1974	Nov	15	RA	Goodnight Vienna is released.	US
1974	Nov	16	O	"Whatever Gets You Thru the Night" reached No. 1 on the Billboard Hot 100, making John the last member of the band to do so.	US
1974	Nov	17	O	John and May attended the premiere of the stage play Sgt. Pepper's Lonely Hearts Club Band on the Road in New York City.	US
1974	Nov	17	O	John and May go to afterparty of the stage play Sgt. Pepper's Lonely Hearts Club Band on the Road. Also in attendance were Ronnie Spector, Alice Cooper and Peter Bennett at Hippopotamus Club.	US
1974	Nov	28	PC	John makes a surprise appearance at Elton John's concert at New York's Madison Square Garden; it is Lennon's last appearance before a paying audience.	US
1974	Dec	09	V	John Lennon makes an appearance on ABC-TV's Monday Night Football.	US
1974	Dec	19	B	Paul and George meet to dissolve the Beatles' partnership in New York; John fails to attend.	US
1974	Dec	20	PC	The final known photo of John and George together is taken at Hippopotamus Club.	US
1974	Dec	20	PC	Paul and Linda McCartney secretly attend a George Harrison Dark Horse concert in New York.	US
1974	Dec	29	B	Lennon signs documents to dissolve the Beatles' partnership at Disneyland.	US
1975	Jan	9	B	The Beatles' partnership is officially dissolved by London's High Court of Justice.	UK
1975	Jan	15	S	Paul and Linda visited John and May in their New York apartment; Lennon had intended to record with the McCartneys in New Orleans, but he reconciled his relationship with Yoko.	US
1975	Jan	27	RS	"No No Song" single is released.	US
1975	Jan	30	S	Lennon records "Across The Universe" and "Fame" with David Bowie.	US
1975	Feb		L	Lennon ends his relationship with May Pang.	UK
1975	Feb	07	RA	Roots: John Lennon Sings the Great Rock & Roll Hits released via mail-order.	US
1975	Feb	17	RA	Rock 'n' Roll released, being John's last "newly recorded" album to be released on Apple Records.	US
1975	Feb	19	B	Music publisher Morris Levy sue John Lennon due to the similarity of the Beatles' "Come Together" to Chuck Berry's "You Can't Catch Me".	US
1975	Feb	21	RS	"Snookeroo" single is released.	UK
1975	Mar	01	V	Lennon and Ono attend the 17th Annual Grammy Awards ceremony.	US
1975	Mar		RA	Nilsson's Duit on Mon Dei album released	US
1975	Apr	04	B	John Lennon settles his lawsuit with Allen Klein's ABKCO.	US
1975	Apr	18	V	John Lennon appears on the television special Salute To Sir Lew; it is Lennon's last television appearance.	US
1975	May	02	B	Apple Corps' headquarters at 3 Savile Row is closed down.	UK
1975	May	16	O	John Lennon takes part in the WFIL-AM "Helping Hand Marathon" charity fundraiser on in Philadelphia.	US
1975	May	27	RA	Venus and Mars is released.	US
1975	Jun	02	RS	"(It's All Down to) Goodnight Vienna" single is released.	US
1975	Jun	16	B	Lennon files a lawsuit against the United States Immigration and Justice Department.	US
1975	Jul	17	L	Ringo Starr and Maureen Starkey's divorce is finalised on the grounds of Starr's affair with American model Nancy Lee Andrews.	UK
1975	Aug	26	B	John Lennon files an affidavit affirming the information compiled at the request of the US Immigration and Naturalization Service.	US
1975	Sep	22	RA	Extra Texture (Read All About It) is released, being George's last album to be released on Apple Records.	US
1975	Oct	07	B	The US Court of Appeals for the Second Circuit rules in favour of John Lennon's appeal to have his deportation ruling overturned.	US
1975	Oct	09	L	Sean Lennon is born in New York City to John Lennon and Yoko Ono, on his father's 35th birthday.	US
1975	Oct	20	RA	Shaved Fish is released, being John's last album to be released on Apple Records.	US
1975	Nov	20	RA	Blast from Your Past is released, being Ringo's last album to be released on Apple Records.	US
1975	Dec	13	L	Paul and Linda McCartney pay a visit to John Lennon and Yoko Ono in New York City.	US
1975	Dec	20	L	John Lennon and Yoko Ono have dinner with Paul and Linda McCartney at Elaine’s restaurant and bar.	US
1976	Jan		RA	Nilsson's Sandman album released	US
1976	Jan	03	B	Mal Evans writes his last will and testament.	US
1976	Jan	04	L	Mal Evans is shot and killed by police in Los Angeles.	US
1976	Jan	09	RS	"Oh My My" single is released.	UK
1976	Jan	26	B	The former Beatles' nine-year recording contract with EMI / Parlophone officially expires.	US
1976	Feb	19	B	Maurice Levy loses his lawsuit against John Lennon.	US
1976	Mar	08	RS	"Yesterday" / "I Should Have Known Better" released.	UK
1976	Mar	25	RA	Wings at the Speed of Sound released.	US
1976	May	27	S	John records his piano part in Cherokee Studios in Los Angeles for Starr's Ringo’s Rotogravure album to record "Cookin' (In the Kitchen of Love)" written by Lennon.	US
1976	May	31	RS	"Got to Get You into My Life" / "Helter Skelter" is released.	US
1976	Jun		RA	Nilsson's ...That's the Way It Is album released	US
1976	Jun	07	RA	Rock 'n' Roll Music is released.	UK
1976	Jun	20	L	Paul and Linda attended Brian Wilson’s 34th birthday party in Los Angeles.	US
1976	Jun	29	RS	"Back in the U.S.S.R." / "Twist and Shout" is released.	UK
1976	Jul	27	L	John Lennon is awarded permanent residence in the United States.	US
1976	Sep	17	RA	Ringo's Rotogravure is released.	US
1976	Oct		B	Apple Corps sells the 3 Savile Row building.	UK
1976	Nov	08	RS	"Ob-La-Di, Ob-La-Da" / "Julia" is released.	UK
1976	Nov	15	RS	"This Song" / "Learning How to Love You" is released.	US
1976	Nov	19	RA	Thirty Three & 1/ॐ is released.	US
1976	Dec	25	O	John and Yoko attend a Christmas Day party thrown by Mick and Bianca Jagger.	US
1977			RA	Nilsson's Knnillssonn album released, being Harry's last album to be released on RCA Records.	US
1977	Jan	08	B	Apple Corps ends its legal dispute with Allen Klein's ABKCO.	US
1977	Jan	24	RS	"Crackerbox Palace" / "Learning How to Love You" is released.	US
1977	Feb	18	RS	"True Love" / "Pure Smokey" is released.	UK
1977	Feb	19	V	Ringo attends the 19th Annual Grammy Awards ceremony.	US
1977	Apr	04	B	Apple Corps launch legal action to attempt to prevent the release of Live! at the Star-Club in Hamburg, Germany; 1962.	UK
1977	Apr	06	B	Apple Corps loses their legal action to attempt to prevent the release of "Live! at the Star-Club".	UK
1977	Apr	08	RA	Live! at the Star-Club in Hamburg, Germany; 1962 is released.	UK
1977	May	04	RA	The Beatles at the Hollywood Bowl is released.	UK
1977	Jun	09	L	George and Pattie Harrison divorce.	UK
1977	Jun	17	RS	"It's What You Value" / "Woman Don't You Cry for Me" is released.	US
1977	Aug	25	RS	"Wings" is released.	US
1977	Sep	12	L	James McCartney is born in London to Paul and Linda McCartney.	UK
1977	Sep	16	RS	"Drowning in the Sea of Love" is released.	US
1977	Sep	20	RA	Ringo the 4th is released.	US
1977	Oct		RA	John Lennon records a demo of "Real Love".	US
1977	Oct	21	RA	Love Songs is released.	UK
1977	Oct	21	L	John Lennon is best man at the wedding of American actor Peter Boyle and journalist Loraine Alterman.	US
1977	Nov	18	B	Ringo Starr resigns from the board of directors at Apple Corps.	US
1978	Mar	22	RF	All You Need Is Cash premieres on NBC.	US
1978	Mar	27	RF	All You Need Is Cash premieres on BBC2.	UK
1978	Mar	31	RA	London Town is released.	US
1978	Apr	21	RA	Bad Boy is released.	US
1978	Apr	26	RF	Ringo premieres on NBC.	US
1978	Aug	01	L	Dhani Harrison is born in Windsor, Berkshire, to George and Olivia Trinidad Arias.	UK
1978	Aug	14	RS	"Sgt. Pepper's Lonely Hearts Club Band", "With a Little Help from My Friends" / "A Day in the Life" is released.	UK
1978	Sep	02	L	Harrison marries Olivia Trinidad Arias at the Henley-on-Thames Register Office, England.	UK
1978	Nov	02	RA	The Beatles Collection is released.	UK
1978	Dec	02	RA	Rarities is released.	UK
1978	Dec		B	Ring O' Records is defuncted.	US
1979	Feb	14	RA	George Harrison is released.	US
1979	Jun	08	RA	Back to the Egg is released.	US
1979	Nov	12	B	John Lennon signs his last will and testament.	US

== 1980s ==
Date			T	Event	L
1980			RA	Nilsson's Flash Harry is released, being Nilsson's last album recorded in his lifetime.	US
1980	Mar	24	RA	Rarities is released.	US
1980	Apr	11	RS	The single "Coming Up" / Coming Up (Live at Glasgow) / "Lunch Box/Odd Sox" is released.	US
1980	Apr	11	S	John records a video demo of the song, "Dear Yoko" at his Cold Spring Habor Home.	US
1980	May	16	B	McCartney II is released.	US
1980	Jun	13	RS	The single "Waterfalls" / "Check My Machine" is released.	US
1980	Aug	07	S	John Lennon and Yoko Ono begin secret recording sessions at New York City's famed Hit Factory.	US
1980	Sep		RS	Nilsson's single "I Don't Need You" / "It's So Easy" is released.	US
1980	Sep	19	RS	The single "Temporary Secretary" / "Secret Friend" is released.	US
1980	Oct		B	Lennon and Ono signed a contract with Geffen Records.	US
1980	Oct	13	RA	The Beatles Ballads is released.	UK
1980	Oct	17	RS	Nilsson's single "Rain" / "Bright Side of Life" is released.	US
1980	Oct	23	RS	The single "(Just Like) Starting Over" / "Kiss Kiss Kiss" is released.	US
1980	Nov	03	RA	The Beatles Box is released.	UK
1980	Nov	15	O	John and Yoko visit Ringo at The Plaza Hotel in New York City for five hours catching up, being last time Ringo saw John in his lifetime.	US
1980	Nov	17	RA	The Lennon's Double Fantasy is released, being John's last album recorded in his lifetime.	US
1980	Nov	26	V	Lennon and Ono were filmed in several Manhattan locations.	US
1980	Dec	08	L	Lennon is shot and killed outside his New York City apartment building.	US
1980	Dec	14	L	Ono requests 10 minutes of silence around the world.	US
1980			L	Nilsson joins the Coalition to Stop Gun Violence and overcomes his preference for privacy to make appearances for gun control fundraising.	US
1981	Apr	27	L	Starr marries Barbara Bach, whom he met on the set of Caveman. All surviving Beatles are present.	UK
1981	May	11	RS	"All Those Years Ago" is released as a personal tribute to Lennon.	US
1981	Jun	01	RA	Somewhere in England is released.	US
1981	Jun	03	RA	Yoko's Season of Glass is released.	US
1981	Jul	20	RS	"Teardrops" is released.	US
1981	Aug		RS	"No, No, No" is released.	US
1981	Oct		RS	"Goodbye Sadness" is released.	US
1981	Oct	27	RA	Stop and Smell the Roses is released.	US
1981	Oct	27	RS	"Wrack My Brain" is released.	US
1981	Nov	13	RS	"Wrack My Brain" is released.	UK
1982			RS	Nilsson releases an exclusive limited-edition single called "With a Bullet" at Beatlefest to raise money for gun control.	US
1982	Mar	22	RA	Reel Music is released.	UK
1982	Mar	22	RS	"The Beatles Movie Medley" / "I'm Happy Just to Dance with You" is released.	UK
1982	Oct	11	RA	20 Greatest Hits is released.	US
1982	Oct	18	RA	20 Greatest Hits is released.	UK
1984			L	Jimmie Nicol participates in a Beatles convention in Amsterdam.	US
1984	Jan	06	RS	"Nobody Told Me" / "O' Sanity" is released.	UK
1984	Jan	27	RA	The Lennon's Milk and Honey is released.	US
1984	Feb	01	RF	The Compleat Beatles is released.	UK
1984	Mar	09	RS	"Borrowed Time" / "Your Hands" is released.	UK
1984	Mar	15	RS	"I'm Stepping Out" / "Sleepless Night" is released.	US
1984	Dec	10	RA	The Early Tapes of the Beatles is released.	UK
1988	Mar	07	RA	Past Masters is released.	UK
1988	Nov	15	RA	The Beatles Box Set released.	UK

== 1990s ==
Date			T	Event	L
1991	Nov	13	RF	The Beatles: The First U.S. Visit is released.	UK
1994	Jan	15	L	Harry Nilsson dies of a heart attack in his Agoura Hills, California, home at the age of 52.	US
1994	Jan	19	O	At Lennon's induction into the Rock and Roll Hall of Fame, McCartney receives from Yoko Ono tapes of her late husband's demo recordings.	US
1994	Feb	11	S	McCartney, Harrison and Starr record overdubs on Lennon's demo of "Free as a Bird" with former Beatles engineer Geoff Emerick and producer Jeff Lynne.	UK
1994	Nov	30	RA	Live at the BBC is released.	UK
1994	Dec	30	L	Maureen Starkey dies of complications related to leukaemia treatment in Seattle, Washington.	US
1995	Feb	1	S	McCartney, Harrison and Starr start recording sessions for Lennon's demo of "Now and Then" with sound engineer Marc Mann and producer Jeff Lynne but abandon the work because of the poor sound quality.	UK
1995	Feb	10	S	Remaining Beatles start recording sessions for Lennon's demo of "Real Love".	UK
1995	Mar	20	RS	"Baby It's You" / "I'll Follow the Sun" / "Devil in Her Heart" / "Boys" (CD maxi-single) is released.	UK
1995	May	09	RA	For The Love of Harry: Everybody Sings Nilsson is released.	US
1995	Nov	19	RF	The Beatles Anthology series premieres on ABC.	US
1995	Nov	21	RA	Anthology 1 is released.	UK
1995	Nov	26	RF	The Beatles Anthology series premieres on ITV.	UK
1995	Dec	04	RS	"Free as a Bird" / "Christmas Time (Is Here Again)" is released.	UK
1996	Mar	04	RS	"Real Love" / "Baby's in Black" (live) is released.	UK
1996	Mar	18	RA	Anthology 2 is released.	UK
1996	Oct	28	RA	Anthology 3 is released.	UK
1997	Mar	11	L	Paul McCartney is knighted.	UK
1998	Apr	17	L	Linda McCartney dies of breast cancer in Tucson, Arizona.	US
1998			L	Shortly after Linda's death, Yoko writes a tribute to Linda as a letter to Rolling Stone magazine.	US
1999	Sep	13	RA	Yellow Submarine Songtrack is released.	UK
1999	Dec	14	PC	McCartney and his band perform live at Cavern Club, being McCartney's first appearance at the Cavern since the Beatles' final show there.	UK
1999	Dec	30	L	George Harrison is attacked in his home and is seriously injured.	UK

== 2000s ==
Date			T	Event	L
2000	Oct	5	RB	The Beatles Anthology book is published.	UK
2000	Nov	13	RA	1 is released.	UK
2001	Jul	02	O	Liverpool's Speke Airport is renamed Liverpool John Lennon Airport.	UK
2001	Nov	12	L	Paul and Ringo meet George for the last time at his hotel in New York.	US
2001	Nov	29	L	Harrison dies of cancer in Los Angeles.	US
2002	Jun	11	L	McCartney marries Heather Mills at Castle Leslie in County Monaghan, Ireland.	O
2003	Mar	31	RF	The Beatles Anthology is released on DVD.	UK
2003	Oct	28	L	Beatrice McCartney is born to Paul and Heather Mills McCartney.	UK
2003	Nov	17	RA	Let It Be... Naked is released.	UK
2004	Nov	16	RA	The Capitol Albums, Volume 1 is released.	UK
2006	Apr	11	RA	The Capitol Albums, Volume 2 is released.	UK
2006	Jun	30	O	Premiere of Cirque du Soleil's Love in Las Vegas.	US
2006	Nov	20	RA	Love is released.	UK
2008	Feb	18	L	Divorce proceedings between Paul and Heather Mills McCartney conclude in court 34 of the Royal Courts of Justice, on The Strand, in the City of Westminster, London.	UK
2008	Mar	24	L	Neil Aspinall dies of cancer in New York City.	US
2008	Oct	20	RF	All Together Now is released.	UK
2009	Sep	09	RA	The Beatles in Mono is released.	UK
2009	Sep	09	RA	The Beatles (The Original Studio Recordings) is released.	UK
2009	Sep	09	RG	The Beatles: Rock Band is released.	UK
2009	Dec	07	RA	The Beatles Stereo Box Set USB flash drive is released.	UK

== 2010s ==
Date			T	Event	L
2010	Nov	16	O	Beatles music catalogue is released on iTunes.	O
2011	Oct	09	L	Paul McCartney marries Nancy Shevell.	UK
2013	Nov	11	RA	On Air – Live at the BBC Volume 2 is released.	UK
2014	Jan	21	RA	The U.S. Albums is released.	US
2015	Apr	01	L	Cynthia Lennon dies of cancer in Majorca, Spain.	O
2015	Nov	06	RF	1+ is released.	UK
2015	Dec	24	O	Beatles music catalogue is released on nine streaming sites.	O
2016	Mar	08	L	George Martin dies at the age of 90.	UK
2016	Jul	14	O	Premiere of the revamped Love show in Las Vegas.	US
2016	Sep	09	RA	The Beatles: Live at the Hollywood Bowl is released.	UK
2016	Sep	15	RF	The Beatles: Eight Days a Week is released in cinemas (and streaming on Sept. 17).	UK
2016	Nov	18	RF	The Beatles: Eight Days a Week DVD and Blu-ray is released.	UK
2017	May	26	RA	Sgt. Pepper's Lonely Hearts Club Band: 50th Anniversary Edition is released.	UK
2017	Dec	15	RA	The Beatles Christmas Record Box vinyl edition is released.	UK
2018	Mar	20	L	Ringo Starr is knighted and becomes Sir Richard Starkey.	UK
2018	May	04	L	Paul McCartney is awarded the Order of the Companions of Honour for his service to music.	UK
2018	Nov	09	RA	The Beatles: 50th Anniversary Edition is released.	UK
2019	Sep	27	RA	Abbey Road: 50th Anniversary Edition is released.	UK

== 2020s ==
Date			T	Event	L
2020	Mar	15	O	As a worldwide lockdown due to the COVID-19 pandemic is implemented, the Love show in Las Vegas is temporarily shut down.	US
2020	May	12	L	Astrid Kirchherr dies at age of 81.	UK
2021	Jan	16	L	Phil Spector dies at age of 81, due to complications relating to Covid-19.	US
2021	Feb	1	S	After 26 years, McCartney resumes recording overdubs for Lennon's demo of "Now and Then" using Harrison's guitar parts from the 1995 sessions.	UK
2021	Aug	26	O	Love show in Las Vegas resumes after pandemic lock down.	US
2021	Oct	12	RB	The Beatles: Get Back book is published.	UK
2021	Oct	15	RA	Let It Be: Special Edition is released.	UK
2021	Nov	25	RF	Peter Jackson's first episode of The Beatles: Get Back limited series starts streaming on Disney+. The other two episodes air on each following days.	US
2022	Jan	28	RA	Get Back – The Rooftop Performance is released onto streaming services.	UK
2022	Jan	30	RF	The Beatles: Get Back – The Rooftop Concert is released in theaters.	UK
2022	Apr	9	S	Lennon's voice previously isolated by Park Road Post's machine learning engineer Emile de la Rey, Starr records his drum part and back-up vocals for "Now and Then" at his home studio in Los Angeles.	US
2022	May	1	S	McCartney and producer Giles Martin supervise the orchestral recording by arranger Ben Foster for Now and Then at Capitol Studios in Los Angeles.	US
2022	Oct	28	RF	Revolver: Special Edition is released.	UK
2023	May	22	L	Chas Newby dies at the age of 81.	UK
2023	Nov	02	RS	"Now and Then"/"Love Me Do" (1962 Single Version) released, first new music from The Beatles since 1996.	UK
2023	Nov	10	RA	Remixed and augmented editions of 1962–1966 and 1967–1970 are released.	UK
2023	Dec	05	L	former Wings bandmate, Denny Laine dies at the age of 79 from interstitial lung disease in Naples, Florida.	US
2024	May	08	RF	1970's Let It Be documentary, restored and remastered by Peter Jackson's team, starts streaming on Disney+.	US
2024	Jul	07	O	Cirque du Soleil's Love show in Las Vegas closes after eighteen years.	US
2024	Nov	22	RA	1964 US Albums in Mono box set released.	UK
2024	Nov	29	RF	Beatles '64, a documentary of the group's first visit to the US, starts streaming on Disney+.	US
2025	Apr	05	L	Pete Best announced his retirement at the age of 83.	UK
2025	Oct	21	RB	The Beatles Anthology book reedited ahead of the project's 30th anniversary.	UK
2025	Nov	21	RA	The Beatles Anthology albums reissued, augmented with a fourth double album including AI-assisted remixes of "Free as a Bird" and "Real Love".	UK
2025	Nov	26	RF	The Beatles Anthology series starts streaming on Disney+ including a ninth episode directed by Oliver Murray.	UK
2026	Oct	2	RA	Rubber Soul: Special Edition is released including a demo of a new Lennon song, Little Girl.	UK

== Album and single releases ==
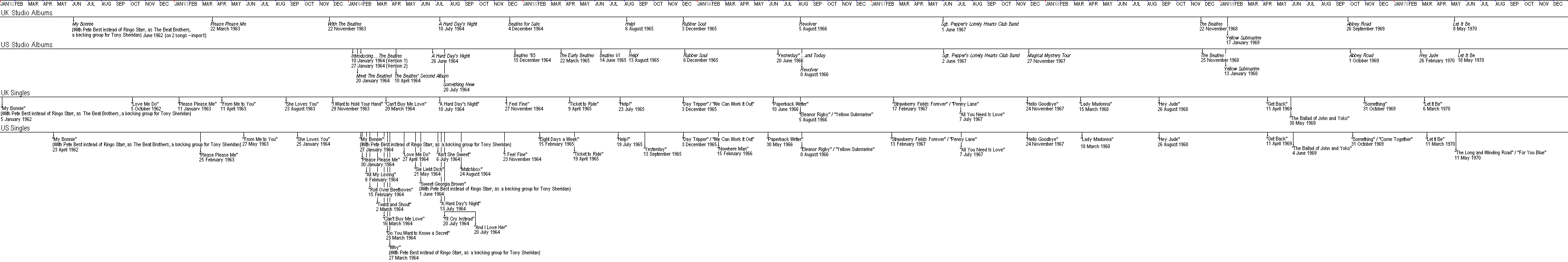
Timeline of the Beatles' album and single releases in the UK and US

== See also ==
- Outline of the Beatles

== Sources ==
- The Beatles (2000). The Beatles Anthology. San Francisco: Chronicle Books. ISBN 0-8118-2684-8.
- Clayson, Alan (2005) [2001]. Ringo Starr: A Life (2nd ed.). Sanctuary. ISBN 978-1-86074-647-5.
- Davies, Hunter (2009) [1968]. The Beatles: The Authorized Biography (3rd revised ed.). W. W. Norton & Company. ISBN 978-0-393-33874-4.
- Doggett, Peter (2009) [2009]. You Never Give Me Your Money: The Beatles After the Breakup. The Bodley Head. ISBN 978-1-847-92074-4.
- Harry, Bill. "While My Guitar Gently Weeps: The Tragic Story of Rory Storm and the Hurricanes". Mersey Beat Ltd.
- Harry, Bill (2002). The Paul McCartney Encyclopedia. Virgin Books Ltd. ISBN 0-7535-0716-1.
- Harry, Bill (2004). The Ringo Starr Encyclopedia. Virgin Books. ISBN 978-0-7535-0843-5.
- Hill, Tim (2007). John, Paul, George, and Ringo: The Definitive Illustrated Chronicle of the Beatles, 1960–1970. New York: Sterling Publishing. ISBN 978-1-4027-4223-1.
- Hill, Tim (2010). The Beatles: Then There Was Music. Hertfordshire: Transatlantic Press. ISBN 978-1-907176-58-6.
- Lennon, Cynthia (2005). John. Crown Publishers. ISBN 0-307-33855-X.
- MacDonald, Ian (2007). Revolution in the Head: The Beatles' Records and the Sixties. Chicago, IL: Chicago Review Press. ISBN 978-1-55652-733-3.
- Miles, Barry (1998). The Beatles: A Diary. Omnibus Press. ISBN 0-7119-6315-0.
- Miles, Barry (2007). The Beatles Diary: An Intimate Day by Day History. East Bridgewater, MA: World Publications Group. ISBN 978-1-57215-010-2.
- Pawlowski, Gareth (1990). How They Became The Beatles. McDonald & Co (Publishers) Ltd. ISBN 0-356-19052-8.
- Spitz, Bob (2005). The Beatles: The Biography. Little Brown. ISBN 0-316-80352-9.
- Gottfridsson, Hans Olof. "The Akustik Audio Recordings". TheBeatleSource.
- Lewisohn, Mark (1988). The Complete Beatles Recording Sessions: The Official Story of the Abbey Road Years. Hamlyn. ISBN 0-600-55784-7.
- Lewisohn, Mark (1992). The Complete Beatles Chronicle. Harmony Books. ISBN 0-517-58100-0.
- Lewisohn, Mark (2013). The Beatles: All These Years, Volume 1 – Tune In. Crown Publishing Group. ISBN 978-1-4000-8305-3.
- Miles, Barry (2001). The Beatles Diary Volume 1: The Beatles Years. London: Omnibus Press. ISBN 978-0-7119-8308-3.
