= 1962–1966 =

1973 compilation album by the Beatles

Compilation album by the Beatles
- Released: 2 April 1973
- Recorded: 11 September 1962 – 21 June 1966
- Studios: EMI, London; Pathé Marconi, Paris
- Genres: Rock; pop
- Length: 62:34
- Label: Apple
- Producer: George Martin
- Compiler: Allen Klein

The Beatles UK chronology
From Then to You (1970)	1962–1966 (1973)	1967–1970 (1973)

The Beatles North American chronology
The Beatles' Christmas Album (1970)	1962–1966 (1973)	1967–1970 (1973)

Professional ratings
Review scores
Source	Rating
AllMusic	4.5/5 stars
Blender	5/5 stars
The Encyclopedia of Popular Music	5/5 stars
The Rolling Stone Album Guide	5/5 stars

1962–1966 (also known as the Red Album) is a compilation album of songs by the English rock band the Beatles, spanning the years indicated in the title and the albums Please Please Me through to Revolver with numerous intervening single releases. Released with its counterpart 1967–1970 (the "Blue Album") in 1973, the double LP peaked at number 3 in the United Kingdom. In the United States, it topped the Cash Box albums chart and peaked at number 3 on the Billboard Top LPs & Tape chart while 1967–1970 reached the top spot. The album was re-released in September 1993 on compact disc, charting at number 3 in the UK.

The album was instigated by Apple Records manager Allen Klein shortly before he was dismissed from his position. Even though the group had success with cover versions of songs, particularly "Twist and Shout", the original release of 1962–1966 contains only songs composed by the Beatles. It also omits any George Harrison compositions from the era, such as "Taxman", and as such, consists entirely of Lennon–McCartney originals.

As with 1967–1970, the compilation was created by Apple and EMI/Capitol Records in response to a bootleg collection titled Alpha Omega, which had been sold on television the previous year. Print advertising for the two records made a point of declaring them "the only authorized collection of the Beatles". The success of the two official double LP compilations inspired Capitol's repackaging of the Beach Boys' 1960s hits, starting with the 1974 album Endless Summer.

A deluxe expanded version of the album was released in 2023. The new release contained remixes of a majority of the tracks, and it added tracks not on the original release, including songs written by Harrison, cover songs and more tracks from Revolver.

== Album covers ==
During the shoot for the group's 1963 debut LP Please Please Me, photographer Angus McBean took the distinctive colour photograph of the group looking down over the stairwell inside EMI House (EMI's London headquarters in Manchester Square, demolished in 1995). The cover for the 1963 EP The Beatles (No. 1) used a picture from the same shoot.

In 1969, the Beatles asked McBean to recreate this shot. Although one of the 1969 photographs was originally intended for the planned Get Back album, it was not used when that project saw eventual release in 1970 as Let It Be. Instead, another 1969 photograph, along with an unused one from the 1963 photo shoot, were used for both this LP and the cover of 1967–1970.

The inner gatefold photo for both LPs has been attributed to both Stephen Goldblatt and Don McCullin, and is from the "Mad Day Out" photo session in London on Sunday 28 July 1968.

The album cover was designed by Tom Wilkes.

== Release variations ==
- Original 1973 UK release: Apple PCSP 7171-2
- Original 1973 US release: Apple SKBO-3403 (whole and sliced apples on red background)
- Second 1976 US pressings: Capitol SKBO-3403 (Capitol target logo on back of album cover, red labels with "Capitol" in light red at bottom. There are also copies erroneously pressed with the BLUE labels for the 1967–1970 pressings.)
- 1978 first US red vinyl issue: Capitol SEBX-11842 (Capitol dome logo on back of album cover, large dome logo at top of labels)

The British and American versions of the vinyl album contain notable differences; for example, "Help!" on the American edition includes the same pseudo-James Bond intro as found on the American Help! soundtrack LP, while the same song on the British edition does not. Also, the British LP uses the stereo "whispering intro" mix of "I Feel Fine", while the U.S. LP uses the mono mix from Beatles '65, which is drenched in additional reverb. In the liner notes associating the songs with their original albums, the U.S. editions referenced the Capitol albums while the UK editions used the British albums.

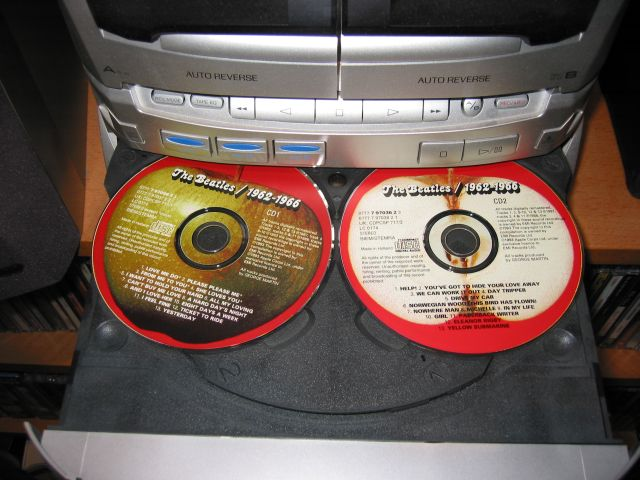
The two discs of the 1993 CD issue in a carousel CD player

The first compact disc version was released on 20 September 1993. It was released on two discs for the price of two albums, though it could have fitted onto a single disc; EMI stated that this was done to match the release of 1967–1970. The CD version used new digital masters. The first four tracks on the CD release are in mono; the rest of the tracks are in stereo. The tracks "All My Loving", "Can't Buy Me Love", "A Hard Day's Night", "And I Love Her" and "Eight Days a Week" made their CD stereo debut with this release. The 1993 versions were also issued on vinyl in the UK.

=== 2010 remastered version ===
EMI announced on 10 August 2010, that the album had been remastered for a second time and, once again, would be released as a two-CD package. The album was released worldwide on 18 October 2010, and 19 October 2010 in North America.

=== 2014 mastered vinyl ===
The album was reissued on 180g vinyl in 2014, prepared from the original UK 1973 compilation master. The fake stereo mixes of the Andy White version of "Love Me Do" (with Starr on tambourine) and "She Loves You" were replaced by the true mono versions, but while the Side 1 label indicated “Please Please Me” and “From Me To You” being mono, they were, in fact, the stereo versions.

=== 2023 remixed editions ===
The compilation, along with its counterpart, was rereleased with an expanded track listing on 10 November 2023.

The 12 additional tracks are: "I Saw Her Standing There", "Twist and Shout", "This Boy", "Roll Over Beethoven", "You Really Got a Hold on Me", "You Can't Do That", "If I Needed Someone", "Taxman", "Got to Get You into My Life", "I'm Only Sleeping", "Here, There and Everywhere", and "Tomorrow Never Knows". Additionally, the version of "Love Me Do" with Ringo Starr on drums, originally issued only on first pressings of the 1962 UK single, replaced the version with Andy White on drums and Starr on tambourine formerly used for this compilation.

Thirty out of the thirty-eight songs on the album received a new stereo mix, while the remaining eight used mixes from the 2022 Revolver: Special Edition set. The album is also available in Dolby Atmos surround sound. On the CD and digital editions, the additional tracks are inserted into the track list in chronological order of each track's original issue, while on the vinyl edition, the first two LPs retain the track list of the 1973 release, with the additional tracks placed on a third LP.

A press conference for the release, along with "Now and Then", was held at the Dolby Screening Room in New York City on 27 September 2023. Tracks from the release were played in the theatre in their newly mixed form.

Rolling Stone called the original red and blue albums "eight of the most-perfect album sides ever devised" and said that the bonus discs "fix the holes in the originals", noting the addition of songs written by Harrison, cover songs and more tracks from Revolver. They said tracks in the compilation "have never thundered like this before". Giles Martin, who mixed the new versions, said of the new mixes, "I never thought it would happen", as Martin has been credited for stating the early recordings were impossible to work with this kind of mix. He said in an interview, "Technically, on the early tracks, it's completely mind-blowing to me how we made them sound. I didn't think it was possible for us to do that to the early tracks. As I've told you, I didn't think that we could do the work we've done on things like 'I Saw Her Standing There' or 'All My Loving' or 'Twist and Shout.' The power of Ringo's drumming, for example, on those early tracks, it's been unearthed. But the playing is just really good. That's joy." The Sunday Times Magazine called the new mixes "extraordinary", and that, on the Red Album particularly, they "sound so fresh it could be by some up-and-coming garage rock band". They also quoted Martin "rejecting the cynicism some people have about reissues". Salon.com said the tracks "came roaring to life with previously unrealised dimensions", and praised the separation of the tracks. For example, they said the mix of bonus track "I Saw Her Standing There" allows the Beatles to be heard "in splendid isolation, all working in the stead of a time-eclipsing song". Tidal Magazine added, "the 2023 revisions are sequenced not like LPs but like playlists, allowing for slight digressions and offering a more immersive experience. It's not quite the same vibe as the original records, yet these 50th-anniversary reissues do hearken back to the origins of the Red and Blue Albums." They also added that "they repurpose the Beatles to suit the habits of streaming listeners — just like how the originals were designed with an LP audience in mind."

On 3 November 2023, the 2023 mix of "Love Me Do" was released alongside "Now and Then".

== Track listing ==
- Although it appeared on the Vee-Jay compilation Jolly What! The Beatles and Frank Ifield on Stage, this is the first appearance of "From Me to You" on a U.S. Capitol album.
- "A Hard Day's Night" also makes its U.S. Capitol album debut here, having previously only appeared on the United Artists soundtrack album of the film of the same name.

All tracks are written by Lennon–McCartney.

Disc 1, side 1
No.	Title	Length
1.	"Love Me Do" (originally a single released October 1962, track used is album version later included on Please Please Me, 1963)	2:22
2.	"Please Please Me" (single released January 1963, included on Please Please Me, 1963)	2:01
3.	"From Me to You" (non-album single, 1963)	1:57
4.	"She Loves You" (non-album single, 1963)	2:22
5.	"I Want to Hold Your Hand" (non-album single, 1963)	2:26
6.	"All My Loving" (from With the Beatles, 1963)	2:09
7.	"Can't Buy Me Love" (from A Hard Day's Night, 1964)	2:13
Total length:		15:30

Disc 1, side 2
No.	Title	Length
1.	"A Hard Day's Night" (from A Hard Day's Night, 1964)	2:34
2.	"And I Love Her" (from A Hard Day's Night, 1964)	2:31
3.	"Eight Days a Week" (from Beatles for Sale, 1964)	2:44
4.	"I Feel Fine" (non-album single, 1964)	2:20
5.	"Ticket to Ride" (from Help!, 1965)	3:11
6.	"Yesterday" (from Help!, 1965)	2:05
Total length:		15:25

Disc 2, side 1
No.	Title	Length
1.	"Help!" (from Help!, 1965)	2:20
2.	"You've Got to Hide Your Love Away" (from Help!, 1965)	2:11
3.	"We Can Work It Out" (non-album single, 1965)	2:16
4.	"Day Tripper" (non-album single, 1965)	2:49
5.	"Drive My Car" (from Rubber Soul, 1965)	2:28
6.	"Norwegian Wood (This Bird Has Flown)" (from Rubber Soul, 1965)	2:05
Total length:		14:09

Disc 2, side 2
No.	Title	Length
1.	"Nowhere Man" (from Rubber Soul, 1965)	2:44
2.	"Michelle" (from Rubber Soul, 1965)	2:42
3.	"In My Life" (from Rubber Soul, 1965)	2:27
4.	"Girl" (from Rubber Soul, 1965)	2:31
5.	"Paperback Writer" (non-album single, 1966)	2:19
6.	"Eleanor Rigby" (from Revolver, 1966)	2:08
7.	"Yellow Submarine" (from Revolver, 1966)	2:39
Total length:		17:30

2023 edition

All tracks are written by Lennon-McCartney, except where noted.

Disc 1
No.	Title	Lead vocals	Length
1.	"Love Me Do (2023 Mix)" (non-album single, 1962)	McCartney and Lennon	2:26
2.	"Please Please Me (2023 Mix)" (single released January 1963, later included on Please Please Me, 1963)	Lennon and McCartney	2:01
3.	"I Saw Her Standing There (2023 Mix)" (from Please Please Me, 1963)	McCartney	2:53
4.	"Twist and Shout (2023 Mix)" (Bert Russell, Phil Medley; from Please Please Me, 1963)	Lennon	2:35
5.	"From Me to You (2023 Mix)" (non-album single, 1963)	Lennon and McCartney	1:58
6.	"She Loves You (2023 Mix)" (non-album single, 1963)	Lennon and McCartney	2:22
7.	"I Want to Hold Your Hand (2023 Mix)" (non-album single, 1963)	Lennon and McCartney	2:27
8.	"This Boy (2023 Mix)" (non-album B-side, 1963)	Lennon, McCartney and Harrison	2:19
9.	"All My Loving (2023 Mix)" (from With the Beatles, 1963)	McCartney	2:09
10.	"Roll Over Beethoven (2023 Mix)" (Chuck Berry; from With the Beatles, 1963)	Harrison	2:46
11.	"You Really Got a Hold on Me (2023 Mix)" (William Robinson, Jr.; from With the Beatles, 1963)	Lennon and Harrison	3:02
12.	"Can't Buy Me Love (2023 Mix)" (from A Hard Day's Night, 1964)	McCartney	2:13
13.	"You Can't Do That (2023 Mix)" (from A Hard Day's Night, 1964)	Lennon	2:33
14.	"A Hard Day's Night (2023 Mix)" (from A Hard Day's Night, 1964)	Lennon and McCartney	2:36
15.	"And I Love Her (2023 Mix)" (from A Hard Day's Night, 1964)	McCartney	2:32
16.	"Eight Days a Week (2023 Mix)" (from Beatles for Sale, 1964)	Lennon and McCartney	2:45
17.	"I Feel Fine (2023 Mix)" (non-album single, 1964)	Lennon	2:20
18.	"Ticket to Ride (2023 Mix)" (from Help!, 1965)	Lennon	3:11
19.	"Yesterday (2023 Mix)" (from Help!, 1965)	McCartney	2:04
Total length:			47:12

Disc 2
No.	Title	Lead vocals	Length
1.	"Help! (2023 Mix)" (from Help!, 1965)	Lennon	2:20
2.	"You've Got to Hide Your Love Away (2023 Mix)" (from Help!, 1965)	Lennon	2:11
3.	"We Can Work It Out (2023 Mix)" (non-album single, 1965)	McCartney with Lennon	2:16
4.	"Day Tripper (2023 Mix)" (non-album single, 1965)	Lennon and McCartney	2:50
5.	"Drive My Car (2023 Mix)" (from Rubber Soul, 1965)	McCartney and Lennon	2:29
6.	"Norwegian Wood (This Bird Has Flown) (2023 Mix)" (from Rubber Soul, 1965)	Lennon	2:06
7.	"Nowhere Man (2023 Mix)" (from Rubber Soul, 1965)	Lennon	2:44
8.	"Michelle (2023 Mix)" (from Rubber Soul, 1965)	McCartney	2:42
9.	"In My Life (2023 Mix)" (from Rubber Soul, 1965)	Lennon	2:27
10.	"If I Needed Someone (2023 Mix)" (George Harrison; from Rubber Soul, 1965)	Harrison	2:24
11.	"Girl (2023 Mix)" (from Rubber Soul, 1965)	Lennon	2:31
12.	"Paperback Writer (2022 Mix)" (non-album single, 1966)	McCartney	2:19
13.	"Eleanor Rigby (2022 Mix)" (from Revolver, 1966)	McCartney	2:08
14.	"Yellow Submarine (2022 Mix)" (from Revolver, 1966)	Starr	2:39
15.	"Taxman (2022 Mix)" (Harrison; from Revolver, 1966)	Harrison	2:38
16.	"Got to Get You into My Life (2022 Mix)" (from Revolver, 1966)	McCartney	2:28
17.	"I'm Only Sleeping (2022 Mix)" (from Revolver, 1966)	Lennon	2:59
18.	"Here, There and Everywhere (2022 Mix)" (from Revolver, 1966)	McCartney	2:24
19.	"Tomorrow Never Knows (2022 Mix)" (from Revolver, 1966)	Lennon	2:58
Total length:			47:33

== Charts ==
=== Weekly charts ===
Original release

Weekly chart performance for 1962–1966 original release
Chart (1973)	Peak position
Australian Kent Music Report Chart	18
Austrian Albums Chart	1
Canadian RPM Albums Chart	4
Dutch Mega Albums Chart	2
Finnish Official Albums Chart	2
French IFOP Albums Chart	1
Italian M&D Albums Chart	21
Japanese Oricon LPs Chart	1
Norwegian VG-lista Albums Chart	1
Spanish Albums Chart	1
UK Albums Chart	3
US Billboard Top LPs & Tape	3
West German Media Control Albums Chart	2

1993 reissue

Weekly chart performance for 1962–1966 1993 release
Chart (1993–2008)	Peak position
Australian Albums Chart	9
Austrian Albums Chart	3
Canadian RPM Albums Chart	15
Danish Albums Chart	26
Dutch Albums Chart	4
Italian M&D Albums Chart	21
Japanese Albums Chart	3
New Zealand Albums Chart	5
Norwegian Albums Chart	7
Spanish Albums Chart	33
Swedish Albums Chart	22
Swiss Albums Chart	4
UK Albums Chart	4
US Billboard Top Pop Catalog	2

2010 reissue

Weekly chart performance for 1962–1966 2010 reissue
Chart (2010)	Peak position
Austrian Albums Chart	64
Belgian Albums Chart (Flanders)	37
Belgian Albums Chart (Wallonia)	55
Dutch Mega Albums Chart	62
German Albums Chart	91
Irish Albums Chart	45
Japanese Albums Chart	4
Spanish Albums Chart	58
Swedish Albums Chart	22
Swiss Albums Chart	57
UK Albums Chart	6
US Billboard 200	32
US Billboard Catalog Albums Chart	2

Chart performance for 1962–1966 in the 2020s
Chart (2021–2023)	Peak position
Australian Albums (ARIA)	15
Austrian Albums (Ö3 Austria)	6
Canadian Albums (Billboard)	31
German Albums (Offizielle Top 100)	7
Greek Albums (Billboard)	7
Hungarian Physical Albums (MAHASZ)	31
Italian Albums (FIMI)	23
Japanese Albums (Oricon)	7
Japanese Combined Albums (Oricon)	8
Japanese Hot Albums (Billboard Japan)	7
New Zealand Albums (RMNZ)	15
Polish Albums (ZPAV)	17
Portuguese Albums (AFP)	37
Spanish Albums (Promusicae)	23
Swedish Albums (Sverigetopplistan)	29
UK Albums (Official Charts)	3

=== Year-end charts ===
Year-end chart performance for 1962–1966
Chart	Year	Position
Austrian Albums Chart	1973	2
Dutch Albums Chart	1973	3
German Albums Chart	1973	14
Japanese Albums Chart	1973	3
US Billboard Pop Albums	1973	32
Austrian Albums Chart	1974	1
German Albums Chart	1974	1
UK Albums Chart	1974	33
US Billboard Pop Albums	1974	95
German Albums Chart	1975	1
German Albums Chart	1976	2
German Albums Chart	1977	12
German Albums Chart	1978	20
Canadian Albums Chart	1993	93
Dutch Albums Chart	1993	55
Japanese Albums Chart	1993	91
Spanish Albums Chart	1993	11
Spanish Foreign Albums Chart	1993	9
UK Albums Chart	1993	67
US Billboard 200	2024	193
UK Albums (OCC)	2025	88

== Certifications and sales ==
In the US, the album sold 1,215,338 LPs by 31 December 1973 and 5,475,942 LPs by the end of the decade.

Certifications and sales for 1962–1966
Region	Certification	Certified units/sales
Argentina (CAPIF)	Platinum	60,000^{^}
Australia (ARIA)	5× Platinum	350,000^{^}
Austria (IFPI Austria)	3× Platinum	150,000^{*}
Belgium	—	25,000
Canada (Music Canada)	Diamond	1,000,000^{^}
Denmark (IFPI Danmark)	3× Platinum	60,000^{‡}
France (SNEP)	Platinum	400,000^{*}
France (SNEP) 1993 release	Platinum	300,000^{*}
France (SNEP) 2010 remaster	Gold	50,000^{*}
Germany (BVMI)	4× Platinum	2,000,000^{^}
Greece	—	25,000
Italy (FIMI) sales since 2009	Gold	25,000^{‡}
Japan (RIAJ)	2× Platinum+Gold	918,000
New Zealand (RMNZ)	4× Platinum	60,000^{^}
Singapore	—	10,000
Spain (Promusicae)	2× Platinum	200,000^{^}
Sweden (GLF)	Platinum	100,000^{^}
Switzerland (IFPI Switzerland)	Platinum	50,000^{^}
United Kingdom (BPI) 1973 release	2× Platinum	600,000^{^}
United Kingdom (BPI) 2023 remixed and expanded release	3× Platinum	900,000^{‡}
United States (RIAA)	15× Platinum	7,500,000^{^}
^{*} Sales figures based on certification alone.^{^} Shipments figures based on certification alone.^{‡} Sales+streaming figures based on certification alone.

== See also ==
- Outline of the Beatles
- The Beatles timeline
