= Beatles for Sale (EP) =

1965 EP by the Beatles

EP by the Beatles
- Released: 6 April 1965
- Studios: EMI, London
- Genre: Rock
- Length: 9:31
- Label: Parlophone
- Producer: George Martin

The Beatles EP chronology
| 4 by the Beatles (1965) | Beatles for Sale (1965) | Beatles for Sale No. 2 (1965) |

Professional ratings
Review scores
| Source | Rating |
|---|---|
| AllMusic | 4/5 stars |

Beatles for Sale is an EP released 6 April 1965 by the Beatles. It is the group's eighth official EP and contains four tracks from the parent LP of the same name. The EP is only available in mono. Its catalogue number is Parlophone GEP 8931. It was also released in Australia, where "Rock and Roll Music" was replaced by "Words of Love", and other countries worldwide, excluding the Americas.

Beatles for Sale entered the British EP chart on 10 April and reached the top spot on 24 April. It remained there for five weeks, and spent another week at number one from 12 June, remaining on the chart for 47 weeks.

As with previous releases, it features sleeve notes by the group's publicist, Tony Barrow. The parent LP was issued in December 1964 and became one of the world's fastest-selling albums.

== Track listing ==
All songs written by Lennon-McCartney, except "Rock and Roll Music" written by Chuck Berry.

Side A

1. "No Reply" – 2:15

2. "I'm a Loser" – 2:30

Side B

3. "Rock and Roll Music" – 2:32

4. "Eight Days a Week" – 2:43

== Personnel ==
- John Lennon – vocals, guitars, harmonica on "I'm a Loser"
- Paul McCartney – bass guitar, vocals
- George Harrison – guitars
- Ringo Starr – drums, percussion
- George Martin – piano on "Rock And Roll Music"

== See also ==
- Outline of the Beatles
- The Beatles timeline
