= All My Loving (EP) =

EP by the Beatles
- Released: 7 February 1964
- Recorded: 11 September 1962 – 30 July 1963, EMI Studios, London
- Length: 9:32
- Label: Parlophone
- Producer: George Martin

The Beatles EP chronology
No. 1 (1963)	All My Loving (1964)	Souvenir of Their Visit to America (1964)

Professional ratings
Review scores
Source	Rating
AllMusic	4/5 stars
Record Mirror	5/5 stars

All My Loving is an EP released by The Beatles in the United Kingdom on 7 February 1964 by Parlophone (catalogue number GEP 8891). It is the Beatles' fourth British EP, featuring four tracks (two from their album Please Please Me and two from With The Beatles), and was released only in mono. It was also released in Sweden, Australia and New Zealand.

== Track listing ==
Side one
No.	Title	Writer(s)	Lead singer	Length
1.	"All My Loving" (from With the Beatles)	John Lennon and Paul McCartney	Paul McCartney	2:10
2.	"Ask Me Why" (from Please Please Me)	John Lennon and Paul McCartney	John Lennon	2:28
Total length:				4:38

Side two
No.	Title	Writer(s)	Lead singer	Length
1.	"Money (That's What I Want)" (from With the Beatles)	Janie Bradford, Berry Gordy	John Lennon	2:52
2.	"P.S. I Love You" (from Please Please Me)	John Lennon and Paul McCartney	Paul McCartney	2:02
Total length:				4:54

== EP sales chart performance ==
=== UK ===
- Entry date: 8 February 1964
- Highest position: 1 (for 8 weeks)
- Weeks on chart: 44 weeks

=== Australia ===
- Entry date: 21 March 1964
- Highest position: 1
- Weeks in chart: 29 weeks

== See also ==
- Outline of the Beatles
- The Beatles timeline
