= The Beatles (No. 1) =

1963 EP by The Beatles

EP by the Beatles
- Released: 1 November 1963
- Recorded: 11 & 20 February 1963, EMI Studios, London
- Genre: Rock
- Length: 9:59
- Label: Parlophone
- Producer: George Martin

The Beatles EP chronology
The Beatles' Hits (1963)	The Beatles (No. 1) (1963)	All My Loving (1964)

Professional ratings
Review scores
Source	Rating
AllMusic	4/5 stars
Record Mirror	5/5 stars

The Beatles (No. 1) is an EP released by the Beatles in the United Kingdom on 1 November 1963. It is the Beatles' third British EP and was only released in mono; its catalogue number is Parlophone GEP 8883. The EP contains songs from Please Please Me, and its cover was taken in the same photoshoot as the Please Please Me and 1962–1966 covers. It was also released in Argentina and New Zealand.

== Track listing ==
All songs originally upon this EP had previously been released on the Please Please Me LP.

Side one
No.	Title	Writer(s)	Lead singer(s)	Length
1.	"I Saw Her Standing There"	John Lennon and Paul McCartney	Paul McCartney	2:55
2.	"Misery"	John Lennon and Paul McCartney	John Lennon	1:47
Total length:				4:42

Side two
No.	Title	Writer(s)	Lead singer(s)	Length
1.	"Anna (Go to Him)"	Arthur Alexander	John Lennon	2:54
2.	"Chains"	Gerry Goffin, Carole King	George Harrison	2:23
Total length:				5:17

== UK EP sales chart performance ==
- Entry date: 9 November 1963
- Highest position: 2
- Weeks on chart: 29 weeks

== See also ==
- Outline of the Beatles
- The Beatles timeline
