= Souvenir of Their Visit to America =

EP by the Beatles
- Released: 23 March 1964
- Recorded: 26 November 1962 ("Ask Me Why") 11 February 1963
- Studio: EMI, London
- Genre: Pop, rock
- Length: 9:18
- Label: Vee-Jay
- Producer: George Martin

The Beatles EP chronology
All My Loving (1964)	Souvenir of Their Visit to America (1964)	Four by The Beatles (1964)

Souvenir of Their Visit to America is an EP of music by English rock band the Beatles. Released on 23 March 1964, it is the first of three Beatles EPs released in the United States and the only one released by Vee-Jay Records. The EP features four songs that had previously been released by Vee-Jay on their Introducing... The Beatles album. This EP did not chart.

== Context ==
Capitol Records, a unit of EMI and sister label to the Beatles' record label Parlophone, had first refusal rights to any material released by an EMI label. Capitol in the US repeatedly turned down the Beatles for most of 1963, so the Beatles' first two singles of that year, as well as an altered version of their British debut album Please Please Me, were released by Vee-Jay Records. Vee-Jay was a small company with few resources, and as a result of little publicity or promotion, the records sold poorly. Vee-Jay lost the rights to the Beatles' music over nonpayment of royalties, and the smaller Swan Records received the rights to issue the "She Loves You" single.

After the Beatles were booked to perform on the popular Ed Sullivan Show in February 1964, Capitol finally exercised its option and signed a deal with the Beatles in November 1963. In a legal settlement with Capitol, Vee-Jay received rights to market the Beatles recordings they possessed until 10 October 1964, at which point all rights to all EMI Beatle recordings in the United States would be assigned to Capitol Records.

== Track listing ==
Side one
No.	Title	Writer(s)	Lead singer	Length
1.	"Misery"	John Lennon and Paul McCartney	John Lennon	1:48
2.	"Taste of Honey"	Ric Marlow and Bobby Scott	Paul McCartney	2:04
Total length:				3:52

Side two
No.	Title	Writer(s)	Lead singer	Length
1.	"Ask Me Why"	John Lennon and Paul McCartney	John Lennon	2:28
2.	"Anna"	Arthur Alexander	John Lennon	2:58
Total length:				5:26

== See also ==
- Outline of the Beatles
- The Beatles timeline
