= 4 by the Beatles =

EP by the Beatles
- Released: 1 February 1965
- Studio: EMI, London
- Genre: Rock
- Length: 10:26
- Label: Capitol
- Producer: George Martin

The Beatles EP chronology
Extracts from the Album A Hard Day's Night (1964)	4 by the Beatles (1965)	Beatles for Sale (1965)

4 by the Beatles is an EP of music by English rock band the Beatles. Released on 1 February 1965, it is the third of three Beatles EPs released in the United States and the second of two by Capitol Records.

== History ==
Although the Beatles' first EP released by Capitol, Four by the Beatles, did not achieve the success the label would have hoped, it did well on the singles chart, which enabled Capitol to create a new series called the "4-By" series, which acted like a "super single". The idea was to market a set of four songs to "complement the artist's singles and albums and not compete with the performer's current hit single". Accordingly, the series' name is a reference to the first Beatles EP from Capitol.

Although initially intended to appear as a single by releasing the "4-By" in a soft sleeve and thus "distinguish the '4-By' product from EP's", 4 by the Beatles was packaged in a cardboard sleeve, similar to regular EP releases. Billboard did not chart the record as a single, either, but as an EP; on the Hot 100, it peaked at number 68, which is also the highest position it achieved on the Cash Box chart. Capitol deleted 4 by the Beatles from its catalogue on 31 December 1965.

4 by the Beatles features four songs that Capitol had released on Beatles '65 in December 1964. All four of these songs were also released on their UK album Beatles for Sale.

== Track listing ==
Side one

1. "Honey Don't" (Carl Perkins) – 2:56
2. "I'm a Loser" (Lennon–McCartney) – 2:30

Side two

3. "Mr. Moonlight" (Roy Lee Johnson) – 2:39
4. "Everybody's Trying to Be My Baby" (Perkins) – 2:25

== Chart performance ==
Chart (1965)	Peak position
US Billboard Hot 100	68
US Cash Box Top 100	68

== See also ==
- Four by the Beatles EP
- Beatles '65
- Four by the Beach Boys EP
- Outline of the Beatles
- The Beatles timeline
