= Rubber Soul: Special Edition =

2026 deluxe edition of Rubber Soul

Compilation album by the Beatles
- Released: 2 October 2026
- Recorded: 12 October – 11 November 1965 (except 17 June 1965 for "Wait")
- Studios: EMI, London
- Label: Apple
- Producers: George Martin (original recordings); Giles Martin (remixes)

The Beatles chronology
Anthology Collection (2025)	Rubber Soul: Special Edition (2026)

Singles from Rubber Soul: Special Edition
- 1. "Michelle (take 1)" Released: 29 July 2026; 2. "Day Tripper (Songwriting Work Tape)" Released: 26 August 2026; 3. "Norwegian Wood (This Bird Has Flown) (Second Version – Take 2)" Released: 14 September 2026

Rubber Soul: Special Edition is an expanded reissue of the 1965 album Rubber Soul by the English rock band the Beatles. It was released on 2 October 2026 by Apple Records.

== Background and release ==
On 28 July 2026, a cryptic countdown appeared on the Beatles' official website with the caption "Good things come to those who Wait", referencing a Rubber Soul track. The countdown ended at 2PM BST, with the announcement being Rubber Soul: Special Edition. The box set was leaked by Amazon France, who put the set up on their website for pre-order before the timer ended.

The release contains a partially complete unreleased demo recorded by John Lennon titled "Little Girl". It also contains the 2023 remixes of the group's non-album single released around that time, "Day Tripper" and "We Can Work It Out". The first take of "Michelle" was released as the first single from the set. The songwriting work tape of "Day Tripper" was released as the second single from the set. Take two of "Norwegian Wood" was released as the third single from the set.

== Contents ==
Newly mixed by producer Giles Martin and engineer Sam Okell, the definitive version of the album is packaged in a 4CD/5LP edition featuring new stereo and Dolby Atmos mixes along with the original mono mix and the original Capitol US and Canadian album version.

The CD set contains four discs:

- the first disc being new stereo mixes of the international (except North America) Rubber Soul's tracks,
- the second disc being the demos and session takes and backing tracks, as well as the 2023 remix of the non-album double A-side single "We Can Work It Out" / Day Tripper", recorded during the Rubber Soul sessions from the 2023 remix of the 1962–1966 Beatles compilation album,
- the third disc being the original mono mix of the release of Rubber Soul in everywhere except North America, and
- the fourth disc being a reassembly of the US and Canadian release by Capitol Records.

The 88-page booklet contains an introduction from Paul McCartney, and a foreword compiled from Lennon's own words.

The album's new stereo remixes were sourced from the original four-track master tapes, and were created with the help of the "de-mixing" technology developed by the team at director Peter Jackson's WingNut Films for his 2021 The Beatles: Get Back documentary series.

== Track listing ==
According to the Beatles' official store:

All tracks are written by Lennon–McCartney, except where noted.

Disc one: New stereo mix of all markets except United States & Canada.
No.	Title	Writer(s)	Length
1.	"Drive My Car"		2:25
2.	"Norwegian Wood (This Bird Has Flown)"		2:05
3.	"You Won't See Me"		3:18
4.	"Nowhere Man"		2:40
5.	"Think for Yourself"	George Harrison	2:16
6.	"The Word"		2:41
7.	"Michelle"		2:40
8.	"What Goes On"	Lennon; McCartney; Richard Starkey	2:47
9.	"Girl"		2:30
10.	"I'm Looking Through You"		2:23
11.	"In My Life"		2:24
12.	"Wait"		2:12
13.	"If I Needed Someone"	Harrison	2:20
14.	"Run for Your Life"		2:18
Total length:			34:59

All tracks are written by Lennon-McCartney, except where noted.

Disc two: Sessions, Demos and The Single
No.	Title	Writer(s)	Length
1.	"Wait" (take 3 – instrumental backing track)		1:11
2.	"Run For Your Life" (takes 1-5 – instrumental backing track)		4:10
3.	"Norwegian Wood (This Bird Has Flown)" (first version – take 1, originally released on Anthology 2 (1996))		2:08
4.	"Norwegian Wood (This Bird Has Flown)" (second version – take 2)		2:20
5.	"Norwegian Wood (This Bird Has Flown)" (third version – take 3)		2:23
6.	"Drive My Car" (takes 1 and 2 – instrumental backing track)		1:43
7.	"Day Tripper" (songwriting work tape)		2:20
8.	"Day Tripper" (take 1 – instrumental backing track)		2:06
9.	"Day Tripper" (takes 2 and 3 – instrumental backing track)		4:08
10.	"If I Needed Someone" (take 1 – instrumental backing track)	Harrison	2:52
11.	"In My Life" (take 1, originally released on Anthology 4 (2025))		2:41
12.	"In My Life" (extract with unused organ solo)		0:40
13.	"We Can Work It Out" (Paul's demo)		0:55
14.	"We Can Work It Out" (take 1 – instrumental backing track)		2:01
15.	"Nowhere Man" (first version – take 2, originally released on Anthology 4)		2:27
16.	"Nowhere Man" (second version – take 5 – instrumental backing track)		2:55
17.	"I'm Looking Through You" (first version – take 1, originally released on Anthology 2)		2:54
18.	"I'm Looking Through You" (second version – take 2)		1:13
19.	"I'm Looking Through You" (second version – take 3)		3:23
20.	"Michelle" (guitar rehearsal)		1:03
21.	"Michelle" (take 1)		3:17
22.	"What Goes On" (take 1 – instrumental backing track)	Lennon; McCartney; Starkey	3:02
23.	"The Word" (takes 1 and 2 – instrumental backing track)		2:29
24.	"Girl" (take 2 – instrumental backing track)		2:50
25.	"Beatle Talk" (Think For Yourself vocal overdubs)	Harrison	7:43
26.	"Little Girl" (John's demo)	Lennon	2:18
27.	"Day Tripper" (2023 mix, originally released on 1962–1966 (2023 edition))		2:50
28.	"We Can Work It Out" (2023 mix, originally released on 1962–1966 (2023 edition))		2:17
Total length:			1:08:56

All tracks are written by Lennon–McCartney, except where noted.

Disc three: Original mono mix of all markets except United States & Canada
No.	Title	Writer(s)	Length
1.	"Drive My Car"		2:25
2.	"Norwegian Wood (This Bird Has Flown)"		2:05
3.	"You Won't See Me"		3:18
4.	"Nowhere Man"		2:40
5.	"Think for Yourself"	Harrison	2:16
6.	"The Word"		2:41
7.	"Michelle"		2:40
8.	"What Goes On"	Lennon; McCartney; Starkey	2:47
9.	"Girl"		2:30
10.	"I'm Looking Through You"		2:23
11.	"In My Life"		2:24
12.	"Wait"		2:12
13.	"If I Needed Someone"	Harrison	2:20
14.	"Run for Your Life"		2:18
Total length:			34:59

All tracks are written by Lennon–McCartney except where noted.

Disc four: Capitol US & Canadian album
No.	Title	Writer(s)	Length
1.	"I've Just Seen a Face"		2:04
2.	"Norwegian Wood (This Bird Has Flown)"		2:05
3.	"You Won't See Me"		3:19
4.	"Think for Yourself"	Harrison	2:19
5.	"The Word"		2:42
6.	"Michelle"		2:42
7.	"It's Only Love"		1:53
8.	"Girl"		2:33
9.	"I'm Looking Through You"		2:30
10.	"In My Life"		2:24
11.	"Wait"		2:15
12.	"Run for Your Life"		2:15
Total length:			30:44

== Reissue personnel ==
According to the following sources:

- Giles Martin – remixer
- Sam Okell – engineer

== Charts ==
Chart performance for Rubber Soul: Special Edition
Chart (2026)	Peak position
Australian Albums (ARIA)	4
Austrian Albums (Ö3 Austria)	1
Belgian Albums (Ultratop Flanders)	2
Belgian Albums (Ultratop Wallonia)	2
Canadian Albums (Billboard)	9
Danish Albums (Hitlisten)	2
Dutch Albums (Album Top 100)	2
Finnish Albums (Suomen virallinen lista)	14
German Albums (Offizielle Top 100)	3
German Pop Albums (Offizielle Top 100)	3
Hungarian Albums (MAHASZ)	27
Irish Albums (Official Charts)	4
Italian Albums (FIMI)	7
Japanese Albums (Oricon)	7
New Zealand Albums (RMNZ)	6
Norwegian Albums (IFPI Norge)	12
Polish Albums (ZPAV)	16
Portuguese Albums (AFP)	58
Spanish Albums (Promusicae)	8
Scottish Albums (Official Charts)	1
Swedish Albums (Sverigetopplistan)	3
Swiss Albums (Schweizer Hitparade)	2
UK Albums (Official Charts)	2
US Billboard 200	4
