= Four by the Beatles =

EP by the Beatles
- Released: 11 May 1964
- Recorded: 1963, EMI Studios, London
- Genre: Rock
- Length: 9:33
- Label: Capitol
- Producer: George Martin

The Beatles EP chronology
Souvenir of Their Visit to America (1964)	Four by the Beatles (1964)	Long Tall Sally (1964)

Four by the Beatles is an EP of music by English rock band the Beatles. Released on 11 May 1964, it is the second of three Beatles EPs released in the United States and the first of two by Capitol Records. The EP features four songs that had previously been heavily imported into the US as Canadian singles. It managed to peak at No. 92 on the US Billboard Hot 100 singles chart.

== Track listing ==
Side one
No.	Title	Writer(s)	Lead singer	Length
1.	"Roll Over Beethoven"	Chuck Berry	George Harrison	2:44
2.	"All My Loving"	John Lennon and Paul McCartney	Paul McCartney	2:03
Total length:				4:47

Side two
No.	Title	Writer(s)	Lead singer	Length
1.	"This Boy"	John Lennon and Paul McCartney	John Lennon	2:11
2.	"Please Mr. Postman"	Brian Holland	John Lennon	2:35
Total length:				4:46

== Chart performance ==
Chart (1964)	Peak position
US Billboard Hot 100	92

== See also ==
- Outline of the Beatles
- The Beatles timeline
