= Little Girl (Beatles song) =

Song by John Lennon

from the album Rubber Soul: Special Edition
- Released: 2 October 2026
- Recorded: 1965
- Studio: Kenwood, Weybridge, Surrey (John Lennon’s Home)
- Length: 2:17
- Label: Apple
- Songwriter: John Lennon
- Producer: Giles Martin

"Little Girl" is a home demo recorded by John Lennon sometime in 1965 that went unknown for six decades until it was announced that it would be included on the Beatles reissue album Rubber Soul: Special Edition (2026). It is credited to Lennon/McCartney.

== Background and release ==
"Little Girl" was recorded sometime in 1965 at John Lennon's home at the time, and dates to around the same time as "Day Tripper". The sixty year old demo never circulated on any bootleg and was never traded amongst collectors. Very few people knew of its existence, not even the band's biggest fans, until the Rubber Soul: Special Edition box set was announced in 2026. According to Kevin Howlett, EMI archivist Allan Rouse was the first person outside of the Lennon Estate, with a few other people who worked at Abbey Road, to have known about it. Giles Martin, who produced the set, only found out about the demo when Sean Lennon gave a tape reel from his father's archives and telling him "Oh, and then there's this."

The song was hinted at on a postcard on which John, sometime in 1965 or 1966, had scribbled some of the lyrics, and subsequently given to George Harrison by a Japanese fan.

The demo consists of Lennon solely on vocal and acoustic guitar "sighing in Buddy Holly mode", according to Rob Sheffield of Rolling Stone. Giles Martin assembled two sections — or possibly four fragments — resulting in a final duration of 2:17 for the track.
