= All My Loving =

- Canadian picture sleeve

Single by the Beatles

from the album With the Beatles
- B-side: "This Boy"
- Released: 22 November 1963
- Recorded: 30 July 1963
- Studio: EMI, London
- Genre: Pop rock
- Length: 2:04
- Label: Parlophone (UK)
- Songwriter: Lennon–McCartney
- Producer: George Martin

Audio sample
- file; help

"All My Loving" is a song by the English rock band the Beatles, from their second UK album With the Beatles (1963). It was written by Paul McCartney (credited to Lennon–McCartney), and produced by George Martin. Though not officially released as a single in the United Kingdom or the United States, the song drew considerable radio airplay, prompting EMI to issue it as the title track of an EP. The song was released as a single in Canada, where it became a number one hit. The Canadian single was imported into the US in enough quantities to peak at number 45 on the US Billboard Hot 100 in April 1964.

== Composition ==
According to journalist Bill Harry, McCartney thought of the lyrics whilst shaving: "I wrote 'All My Loving' like a piece of poetry and then, I think, I put a song to it later". McCartney later told biographer Barry Miles that he wrote the lyrics while on a tour bus and after arriving at the venue he then wrote the music on a piano backstage. He also said "It was the first song [where] I'd ever written the words first. I never wrote words first, it was always some kind of accompaniment. I've hardly ever done it since either."

The lyrics follow the "letter song" model as used on "P.S. I Love You", the B-side of their first single. McCartney originally envisioned it as a country & western song, and George Harrison added a Nashville-style guitar solo. John Lennon's rhythm guitar playing utilised back-and-forth strummed triplets similar to "Da Doo Ron Ron" by the Crystals, a song that was popular at the time, while McCartney plays a walking bass line.

In his 1980 Playboy interview, Lennon said, "[I]t's a damn good piece of work ... But I play a pretty mean guitar in back."

It has been hypothesized that the piece draws inspiration from the Dave Brubeck Quartet's 1959 song "Kathy's Waltz".

== Recording ==
The Beatles recorded the song on 30 July 1963 in eleven takes with three overdubs. The master take was take fourteen overdubbed on take eleven. It was remixed on 21 August (mono) and 29 October (stereo).

A slightly longer stereo edition of the song, featuring a hi-hat percussion introduction not found on the common stereo or mono mixes, was released on the German stereo version of With the Beatles in 1963. Later, it was released in Germany and the Netherlands in 1965 on a compilation album entitled Beatles' Greatest. This version was later released in the UK, but only as part of The Beatles Box (1980). It also turned up on a European CD bootleg release of the US Rarities with other bonus tracks not included on the original LP.

== Releases and performances ==
- "All My Loving" was originally released in the UK on 22 November 1963 on With the Beatles.
- The first US release was on Meet the Beatles!, released 20 January 1964.
- The song was the title track of the All My Loving EP, released in the UK on 7 February 1964.
- The song was released on another EP, Four by The Beatles, in the US on 11 May 1964.

On 9 February 1964, "All My Loving" was the Beatles' opening number on their debut performance on The Ed Sullivan Show; the recording was included on Anthology 1 (1995). The group also performed "All My Loving" three times for BBC radio, once in 1963 and twice in 1964. The final version, which was recorded on 28 February 1964, was included on Live at the BBC.

The song was used twice in films by the group—it plays in the background at the end of the nightclub scene in A Hard Day's Night (1964), though without the drum opening and the coda; while an instrumental version appears in the film Magical Mystery Tour (1967).

According to Alan Weiss, a TV producer who happened to be there, "All My Loving" was playing on the sound system at Roosevelt Hospital emergency room when Lennon was pronounced dead after being shot on 8 December 1980.

== Reviews ==
Among the critics who have praised the song, Ian MacDonald said, "The innocence of early Sixties British pop is perfectly distilled in the eloquent simplicity of this number". Richie Unterberger of AllMusic said it "was arguably the best LP-only track the Beatles did before 1964" and that if it had been released as a single in America it would have been a huge hit. Mark Lewisohn wrote in his The Complete Beatles Recording Sessions book that the song was "magnificent ... by far [McCartney's] best, most complex piece of songwriting yet".^{1988}

Harrison's concise solo has been described as reminiscent of Chet Atkins, and Lennon's complex rhythm work (relying on the unusual use of constant triplets) was referred to as "the most recognizable feature" of the song; Lennon himself later described his performance as "a superb piece of guitar."

== Personnel ==
According to Ian MacDonald:

- Paul McCartney – double-tracked lead vocals, harmony vocals, bass guitar
- John Lennon – backing vocals, rhythm guitar
- George Harrison – backing vocals, rhythm guitar, lead guitar
- Ringo Starr – drums
- George Martin – producer
- Norman Smith – engineer

== Charts ==
Chart (1963–64)	Peak position
Australia (Kent Music Report)	1
Belgium (Ultratop 50 Flanders)	16
Canada (CHUM)	1
Denmark (Salgshitlisterne Top 20)	3
Finland (The Official Finnish Charts)	1
Netherlands (Single Top 100)	2
New Zealand (Lever Hit Parade)	6
Norway (VG-lista)	2
Sweden (Kvällstoppen)	1
Sweden (Tio i Topp)	1
US Billboard Hot 100	45
US Cash Box Top 100	31
West German Media Control Singles Chart	32

== Certifications ==
Region	Certification	Certified units/sales
United Kingdom (BPI)	Silver	200,000^{‡}
^{‡} Sales+streaming figures based on certification alone.

== Cover versions ==
- Amy Winehouse performed a jazz-inspired interpretation of the song with guitarist Femi Temowo, recorded by the BBC in 2004.
- In 1964, the Hollyridge Strings released an instrumental version of the song, which reached No. 93 Billboard Hot 100 chart.
- Duke Ellington released an instrumental cover of the song in his 1965 album Ellington '66.
- Annette Funicello covered the song for her 1964 album Something Borrowed, Something Blue.
- Johnny Young sang the song at the close of every episode of his Australian music show Young Talent Time from 1971-1988.
- Spanish band Los Manolos recorded a rumba style cover of the song for their 1991 album Pasión condal. It was a big hit in the country.
- Jim Sturgess covered the song for the 2007 film Across the Universe. His version was the opening song on the film's soundtrack.
- Exo members D.O, Chen, Lay, and Chanyeol covered the song in 2013 for SBS' Chuseok special Star Faceoff.
- The Dowlands reached number 33 in 1964 with their version.
