= Eight Days a Week =

- US picture sleeve

Single by the Beatles

from the album Beatles VI
- B-side: "I Don't Want to Spoil the Party"
- Released: 4 December 1964 (UK Beatles for Sale album); 15 February 1965 (US single)
- Recorded: 6 and 18 October 1964
- Studio: EMI, London
- Genre: Pop rock
- Length: 2:44
- Label: Capitol
- Songwriter: Lennon–McCartney
- Producer: George Martin

The Beatles US singles chronology
"I Feel Fine" (1964)	"Eight Days a Week" (1965)	"Ticket to Ride" (1965)

Music video
- "Eight Days a Week" on YouTube

"Eight Days a Week" is a song by the English rock band the Beatles. It was written by Paul McCartney and John Lennon based on McCartney's original idea. It was released in December 1964 on the album Beatles for Sale, except in the United States and Canada, where it was first issued as a single A-side in February 1965 before appearing on the album Beatles VI. The song was the band's seventh number 1 single on the Billboard Hot 100, a run of US chart success achieved in just over a year. The single was also number 1 in Canada, as well as in the Netherlands as the A-side of a 7" vinyl single with "Baby's in Black" as the B-side.

The Beatles recorded "Eight Days a Week" at EMI Studios in London in October 1964. The track opens with a fade-in, marking one of the first times that this technique had been used on a pop studio recording. The song was reissued worldwide in 2000 on the Beatles compilation album 1. It also provided the title for director Ron Howard's 2016 documentary film on the band's years as live performers, The Beatles: Eight Days a Week.

== Inspiration ==
Paul McCartney has attributed the inspiration of the song to at least two different sources. In a 1984 interview with Playboy magazine, he credited the title to one of Ringo Starr's malapropisms, which similarly provided titles for the Lennon–McCartney songs "A Hard Day's Night" and "Tomorrow Never Knows". McCartney recalled: "He said it as though he were an overworked chauffeur: 'Eight days a week.' When we heard it, we said, 'Really? Bing! Got it!'"

McCartney subsequently credited the title to an actual chauffeur who once drove him to Lennon's house in Weybridge. In the Beatles Anthology book, he states: "I usually drove myself there, but the chauffeur drove me out that day and I said, 'How've you been?' – 'Oh working hard,' he said, 'working eight days a week.'" In a 2016 interview alongside Starr and Ron Howard, in preparation for the release of the documentary The Beatles: Eight Days a Week – The Touring Years, McCartney reiterated that he had heard it from a chauffeur who was driving him to Lennon's house while he was banned from driving. Starr has said he is not the source of the phrase.

I think we wrote this when we were trying to write the title song for Help! because there was at one time the thought of calling the film Eight Arms To Hold You.

—John Lennon

I remember writing that with John, at his place in Weybridge, from something said by the chauffeur who drove me out there. John had moved out of London. to the suburbs. I usually drove myself there, but the chauffeur drove me out that day and I said, ‘How’ve you been?’ – ‘Oh, working hard,’ he said, ‘working eight days a week.’ I had never heard anyone use that expression, so when I arrived at John’s house I said, ‘Hey, this fella just said, “eight days a week”.’ John said, ‘Right – “Ooh I need your love, babe…” and we wrote it. We were always quick to write. We would write on the spot. I would show up, looking for some sort of inspiration; I’d either get it there, with John, or I’d hear someone say something. John and I were always looking for titles. Once you’ve got a good title, if someone says, ‘What’s your new song?’ and you have a title that interests people, you are halfway there. Of course, the song has to be good. If you’ve called it ‘I Am On My Way To A Party With You, Babe’, they might say, ‘OK…’ But if you’ve called it ‘Eight Days A Week’, they say, ‘Oh yes, that’s good!’

—Paul McCartney, Anthology

== Recording ==
"Eight Days a Week" sample

"Eight Days a Week" was the first song that the Beatles took into the studio unfinished to work on the arrangement during the session, a practice that would become common for the band. The song was recorded on 6 October 1964 during two sessions that together lasted nearly seven hours, with a fifteen-minute break in between. The band tried out several ideas for the intro and outro of the song. The first take featured a simple acoustic guitar introduction. The second take introduced an "oo"-ing vocal that was experimented with until the sixth take, when it was abandoned in favour of a guitar intro. The final outro (along with unused intro takes) was recorded separately, on 18 October.

The completed song incorporated another Beatles' first, in that it begins with a fade-in. "Eight Days a Week" was one of the first pop songs to open with a fade-in (only select examples exist prior such as Johnny Horton's "The Wild One"). The instrumentation on the track consists of acoustic guitar, electric guitar, drums, bass and overdubbed handclaps. The fade-in and coda both include guitar overdubs, played by George Harrison on his Rickenbacker 12-string.

== Release and reception ==
"Eight Days a Week" was released on Beatles for Sale on 4 December 1964. It was sequenced as the opening track on side two of the LP. Describing the unusual effect provided by the fade-in, particularly at the start of an LP side, author Mark Hertsgaard writes that it gave listeners "the sensation of hearing the music before the song actually arrived; it was as if the sound arose out of the distance, like a flock of migrating birds that suddenly fills the sky."

The song, along with two others from the album ("Baby's in Black" and "No Reply"), was considered for a single release. In the end, it was released as a single in the United States on 15 February 1965 (as Capitol 5371), becoming a number-one hit (their seventh in that country). Cash Box described it as "a hard-driving, rollicking pledge of romantic devotion with a contagious repeating rockin’ riff." Record World said "More happy sounds from the Britishers who recently announced their second summer tour of the States." The B-side was "I Don't Want to Spoil the Party". The single release in the US was the result of DJs playing the song from imported copies of the Beatles for Sale album as an exclusive since it did not appear on the album's US counterpart, Beatles '65, nor did the B-side. Both tracks were included on the North American album Beatles VI, released in June 1965.

"Eight Days a Week" was certified gold by the Recording Industry Association of America on 16 September 1965. It was the last of seven songs by the Beatles to top the Billboard Hot 100 over a one-year period, marking an all-time record for a single act. In order, the seven songs were "I Want to Hold Your Hand", "She Loves You", "Can't Buy Me Love", "Love Me Do", "A Hard Day's Night", "I Feel Fine" and "Eight Days a Week". The song was also the second of six Hot 100 chart toppers in a row (not counting the EP 4 by the Beatles) by one act, another record at the time. The other singles in this run were "I Feel Fine", "Ticket to Ride", "Help!", "Yesterday" and "We Can Work It Out".

== Personnel ==
According to Ian MacDonald, except where noted:

- John Lennon – vocal, acoustic rhythm guitar, handclaps
- Paul McCartney – chorus vocal, bass guitar, handclaps
- George Harrison – harmony vocal, lead guitars, handclaps
- Ringo Starr – drums, handclaps

== Live performances ==
Although it was a huge American hit, the group did not think highly of the song (Lennon called it "lousy") and they never performed it live or at any of their radio sessions for the BBC. The only live performance was for UK television on 3 April 1965 edition of the ITV series Thank Your Lucky Stars. No film or videotape of this episode is available and it is considered lost. Because of the lack of filmed performance, for The Beatles: 1+, a music video was created using snippets throughout the band's 1965 Shea Stadium performance.

Paul McCartney performed the song live on 4 May 2013 at the Estádio Mineirão, Belo Horizonte, Brazil, and used it as the opening song for almost all of his 2013–2015 Out There tour shows.

== Charts ==
=== Weekly charts ===
Chart (1965)	Peak position
Belgium (Ultratop 50 Flanders)	9
Belgium (Ultratop 50 Wallonia)	28
Canada Top Singles (RPM)	1
Netherlands (Single Top 100)	1
US Billboard Hot 100	1
US Cash Box Top 100	1
West Germany (Media Control Chart)	5

=== Year-end charts ===
Chart (1965)	Rank
US Billboard Hot 100	55
US Cash Box Top 100	55

== Certifications ==
Region	Certification	Certified units/sales
France	—	50,000
New Zealand (RMNZ)	Gold	15,000^{‡}
United Kingdom (BPI)	Silver	200,000^{‡}
United States (RIAA)	Gold	1,000,000^{^}
^{^} Shipments figures based on certification alone.^{‡} Sales+streaming figures based on certification alone.
