= British Invasion =

US cultural phenomenon of the mid-1960s

- Part of the Swinging Sixties and the broader counterculture of the 1960s
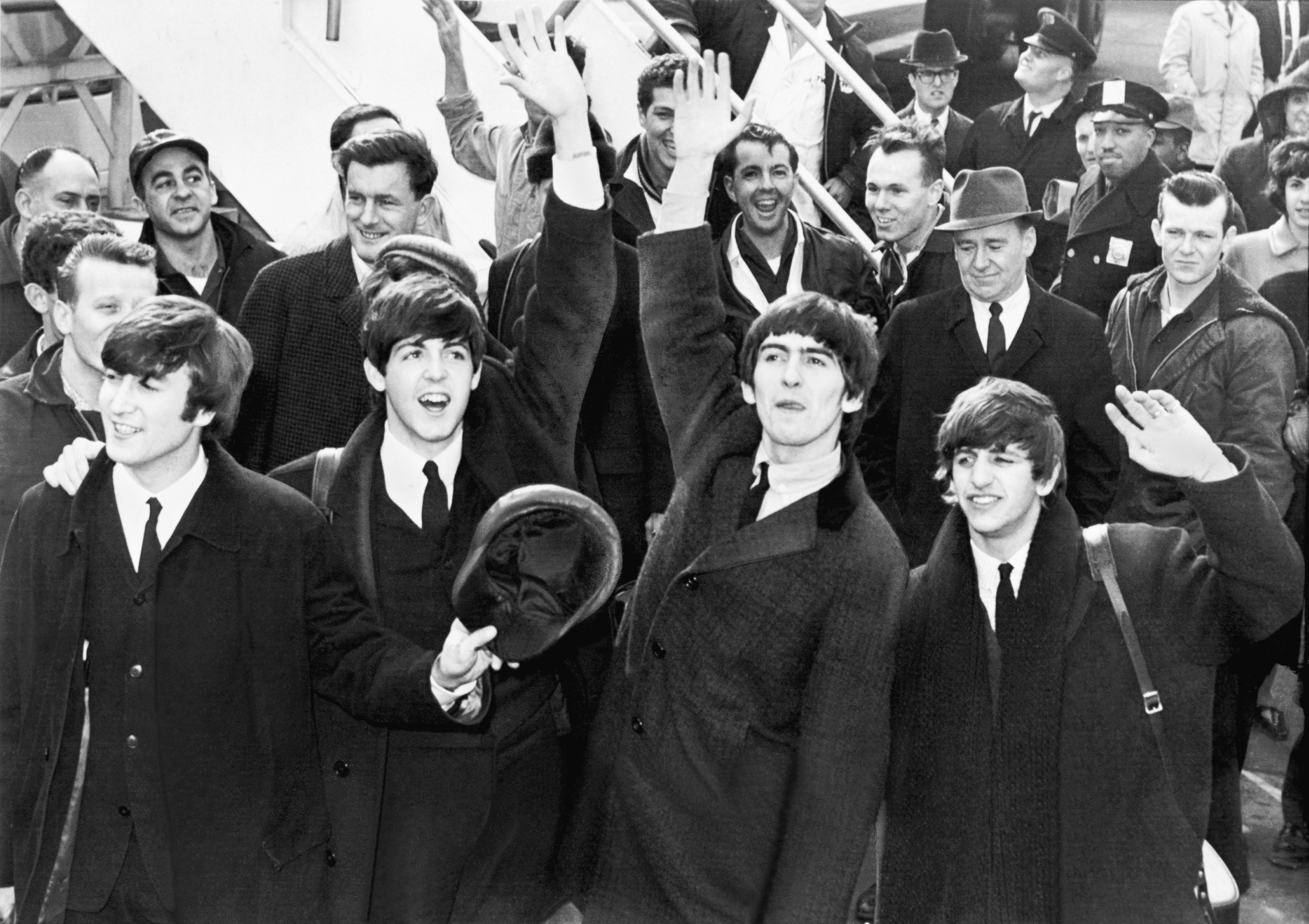
- The arrival of the Beatles in the United States in 1964 marked the start of the British Invasion.
- Date: 1964–1967
- Location: United Kingdom and United States

The British Invasion was a cultural phenomenon of the mid-1960s, when rock and pop music acts from the United Kingdom and other aspects of British culture became popular in the United States with significant influence on the rising "counterculture" on both sides of the Atlantic Ocean. British pop and rock groups such as the Beatles and the Rolling Stones as well as solo artists such as Donovan and Dusty Springfield were at the forefront of the "invasion."

== Background ==
The rebellious tone and image of American rock and roll and blues musicians became popular with British youth in the late 1950s. While early commercial attempts to replicate American rock and roll mostly failed, the trad jazz–inspired skiffle craze, with its do-it-yourself attitude, produced two top-ten hits in the US by Lonnie Donegan. Young British groups started to combine various British and American styles in different parts of the United Kingdom, such as the movement in Liverpool known as Merseybeat or the "beat boom".

While American acts were popular in the United Kingdom, few British acts had achieved any success in the United States prior to 1964. Cliff Richard, who was the best-selling British act in the United Kingdom at the time, had only one Top 40 hit in the US, with "Living Doll" in 1959. Along with Donegan, exceptions to this trend were the US number-one hits "Auf Wiederseh'n, Sweetheart" by Vera Lynn in 1952 (Lynn also had a lower-charting, but more enduring, hit in "We'll Meet Again"), "He's Got the Whole World in His Hands" by Laurie London in 1958, and the instrumentals "Stranger on the Shore" by Acker Bilk and "Telstar" by the Tornados, both in 1962. Also on the Hot 100, "Manhattan Spiritual" by Reg Owen and His Orchestra reached number ten in February 1959, Hayley Mills' "Let's Get Together" from The Parent Trap peaked number eight in October 1961, and in 1962, "Midnight in Moscow" by Kenny Ball reached number two in March, the Springfields' version of "Silver Threads and Golden Needles" peaked at number twenty in September, and Frank Ifield's "I Remember You" reached number five in October.

Some observers have noted that American teenagers were growing tired of teen idol pop acts like Fabian and the "Bobby"s: Bobby Darin, Bobby Vinton, Bobby Rydell, Bobby Vee etc. The Mods and Rockers, two youth "gangs" in mid-1960s Britain, also had an impact in British Invasion music. Bands with a Mod aesthetic became the most popular, but bands able to balance both (e.g., the Beatles) were also successful.

== Beatlemania ==
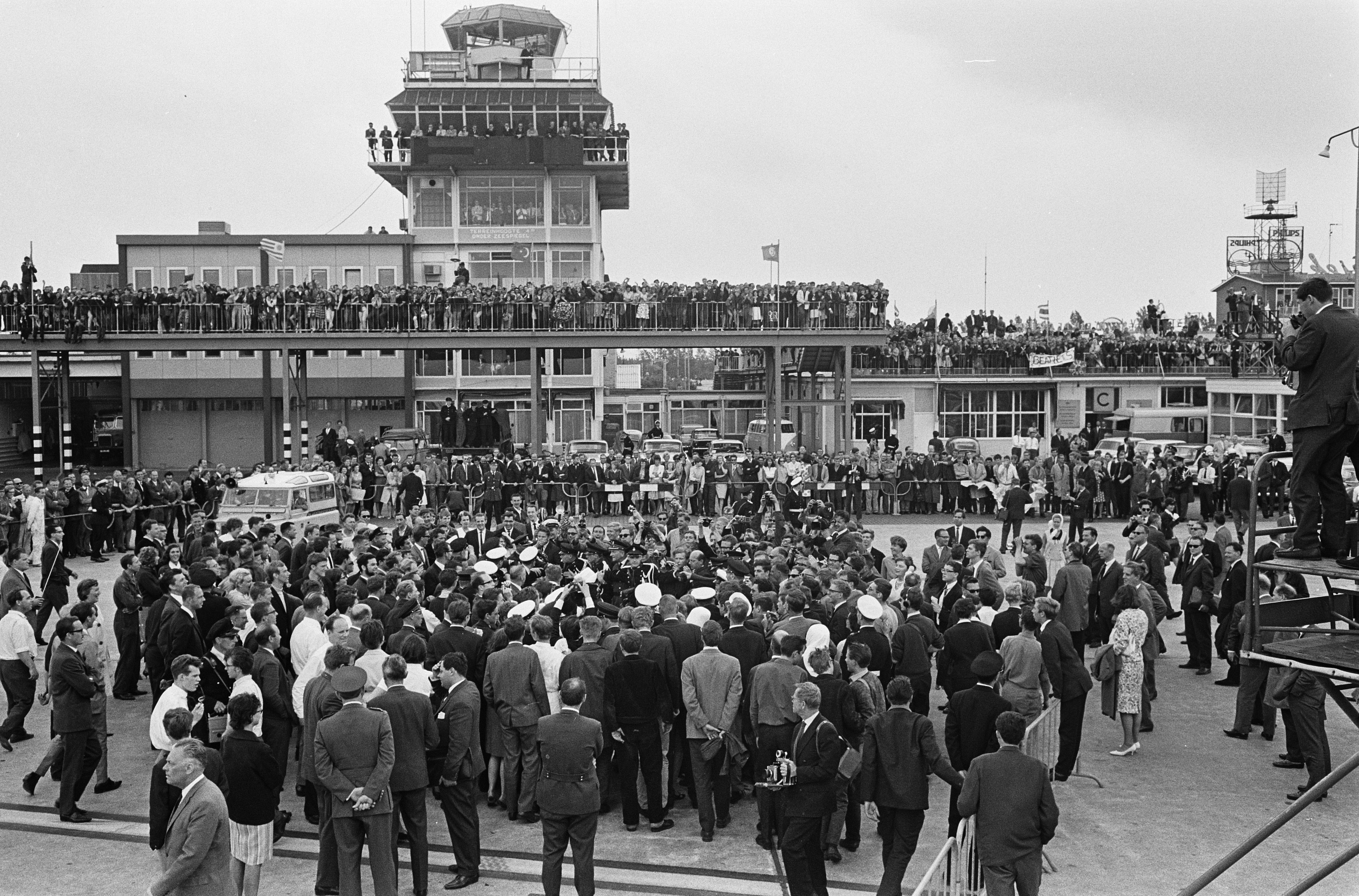
Fans and media swarm the Beatles at Schiphol Airport in the Netherlands in 1964.

In October 1963, the first newspaper articles about the frenzy in England surrounding the Beatles appeared nationally in the US. The Beatles' November 4 Royal Variety Performance in front of the Queen Mother sparked music industry and media interest in the group. During November, a number of major American print outlets and two network television evening programs published and broadcast stories on the phenomenon that became known as "Beatlemania".

On December 10, CBS Evening News anchor Walter Cronkite, looking for something positive to report, re-ran a Beatlemania story that originally aired on the November 22 edition of the CBS Morning News with Mike Wallace but was shelved that night because of the assassination of US President John Kennedy. After seeing the report, 15-year-old Marsha Albert of Silver Spring, Maryland, wrote a letter the following day to disc jockey Carroll James at radio station WWDC asking, "Why can't we have music like that here in America?"

On December 17, James had Miss Albert introduce "I Want to Hold Your Hand" live on the air. WWDC's phones lit up, and Washington, D.C., area record stores were flooded with requests for a record they did not have in stock. James sent the record to other disc jockeys around the country, sparking similar reaction. On December 26, Capitol Records released the record three weeks ahead of schedule. The release of the record during a time when teenagers were on vacation helped spread Beatlemania in the US. On December 29, The Baltimore Sun, reflecting the dismissive view of most adults, editorialised, "America had better take thought as to how it will deal with the invasion. Indeed a restrained 'Beatles go home' might be just the thing." In the next year alone, the Beatles would have thirty different listings on the Hot 100.

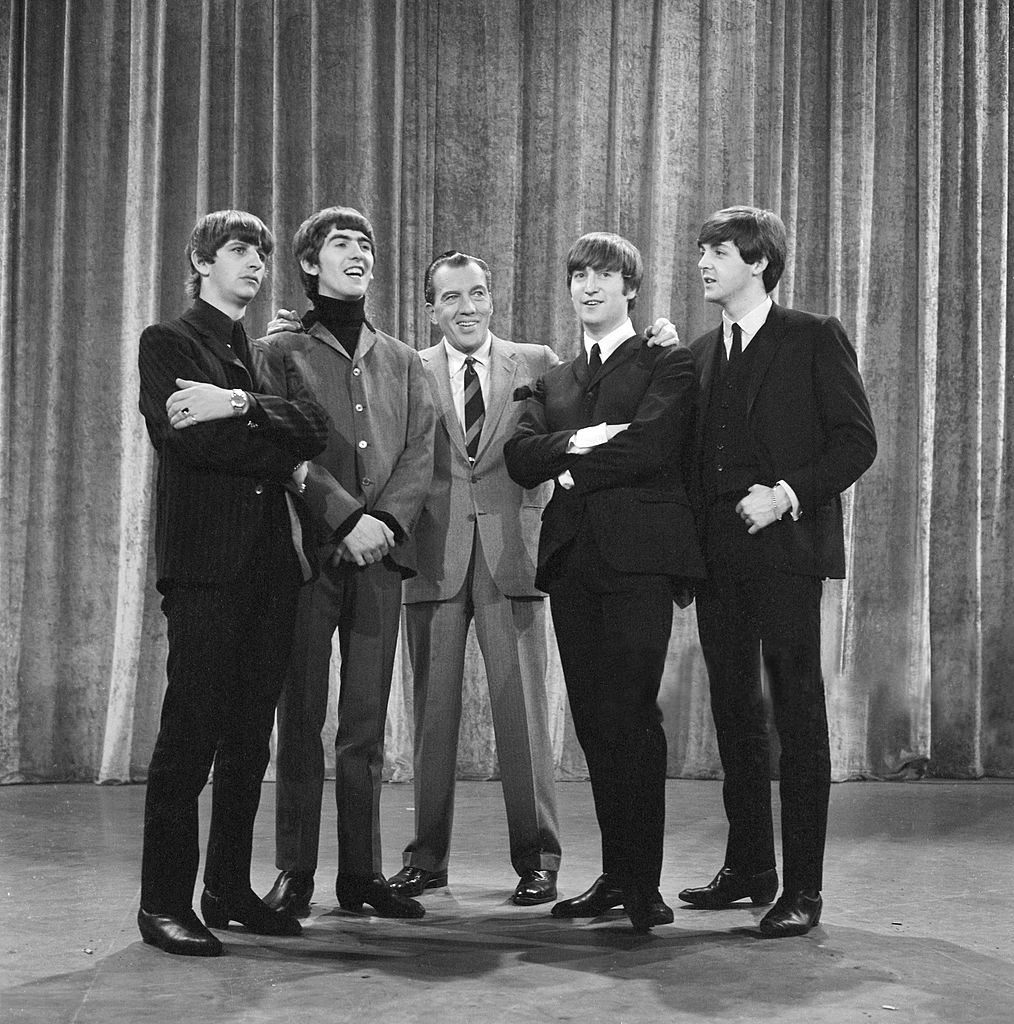
Ed Sullivan and the Beatles, February 1964

On January 3, 1964, The Jack Paar Program ran Beatles concert footage licensed from the BBC "as a joke", but it was watched by 30 million viewers. While this piece was largely forgotten, Beatles producer George Martin has said it "aroused the kids' curiosity". In the middle of January 1964, "I Want to Hold Your Hand" appeared suddenly, then vaulted to the top of nearly every top forty music survey in the US, launching the Fab Four's sustained, massive output. "I Want to Hold Your Hand" ascended to number one on the January 25, 1964, edition of Cash Box magazine (on sale January 18) and the February 1, 1964, edition of the Hot 100. On February 7, 1964, the CBS Evening News ran a story about the Beatles' US arrival that afternoon, of which Walter Cronkite said, "The British Invasion this time goes by the code name Beatlemania."

Two days later, on Sunday, February 9, the group appeared on The Ed Sullivan Show. Nielsen Ratings estimated that 45 percent of American television viewers that night saw their appearance. According to Michael Ross, "It is somewhat ironic that the biggest moment in the history of popular music was first experienced in the US as a television event." The Ed Sullivan Show had for some time been a "comfortable hearth-and-slippers experience." Not many of the 73 million viewers watching in February 1964 would fully understand what impact the band they were watching would have.

In [1776] England lost her American colonies. Last week the Beatles took them back.

— Life magazine, early 1964

The Beatles soon incited contrasting reactions and, in the process, generated more novelty records than anyone — at least 200 during 1964–1965 and more inspired by the "Paul is dead" rumour in 1969. Among the many reactions favouring the hysteria were British girl group the Carefrees' "We Love You Beatles" (No. 39 on April 11, 1964) and the Patty Cakes' "I Understand Them", subtitled "A Love Song to the Beatles". Disapproving of the pandemonium were US group the Four Preps' "A Letter to the Beatles" (No. 85 on April 4, 1964) and US comedian Allan Sherman's "Pop Hates the Beatles".

The Beatles held number 1 for a then-record fourteen straight weeks, from February 1 through May 2, but performed even better on Cash Box, holding number 1 for sixteen straight weeks, from January 25, the week before, through May 9, the week after. On April 4, the Beatles held the top five positions on the Billboard Hot 100 singles chart; no other act had simultaneously held even the top four. The Beatles also held the top five positions on Cash Box's singles chart that same week, with the first two positions reversed from the Hot 100. The group's massive chart success, which included at least two of their singles holding the top spot on the Hot 100 during each of the seven consecutive years starting with 1964, continued until they broke up in 1970.

== Beyond the Beatles ==
One week after the Beatles entered the Hot 100 for the first time, Dusty Springfield, having launched a solo career after her participation in the Springfields, became the next British act to reach the Hot 100, peaking at number twelve with "I Only Want to Be with You". (Note: She soon followed up with several other hits, becoming what AllMusic described as "the finest white soul singer of her era." On the Hot 100, Dusty's solo career lasted almost as long, albeit with little more than one quarter of the hits, as the Beatles' group career before their breakup; she continued to have hits on the easy listening and adult contemporary charts into the late 1980s.) During the next three years, many more British acts with a chart-topping US single would appear. (Note: Peter and Gordon, the Animals, Manfred Mann, Petula Clark, Freddie and the Dreamers, Wayne Fontana and the Mindbenders, Herman's Hermits, the Rolling Stones, the Dave Clark Five, the Troggs, Donovan, and Lulu in 1967, would have one or more number one singles in the US. Other Invasion acts included the Searchers, Billy J. Kramer, the Bachelors, Chad & Jeremy, Gerry and the Pacemakers, the Honeycombs, Them (and later its lead singer, Van Morrison), Tom Jones, the Yardbirds (whose guitarist Jimmy Page would later form Led Zeppelin), the Spencer Davis Group (fronted by singer Stevie Winwood), the Small Faces (fronted by singer Rod Stewart), and numerous others. The Kinks, although considered part of the Invasion, initially failed to capitalise on their success in the US after their first three hits reached the Hot 100's top ten (in part due to a ban by the American Federation of Musicians following the band's 1965 US tour) before resurfacing in 1970 with "Lola" and in 1983 with their biggest hit, "Come Dancing".) As 1965 approached, another wave of British Invasion artists emerged. These were usually composed of groups playing in a more pop style, such as the Hollies or the Zombies, as well as artists with a harder-driving, blues-based approach like the Dave Clark Five, the Kinks, and the Rolling Stones. By April 17, British acts accounted for 30 records in the Hot 100, and on May 8, they accounted for eight of the nine British Commonwealth's entries that made a nearly clean sweep of that weekly Hot 100's Top Ten, lacking only a hit at number two, occupied by Gary Lewis & the Playboys' "Count Me In". On May 1, the British Commonwealth also nearly swept the Cash Box singles chart's Top Ten, lacking only a hit at number six, also taken by "Count Me In". The British Commonwealth also held down the top six on the Hot 100 on May 1 and the top six on Cash Box singles chart's Top Ten on April 24. That same year, half of the 26 Billboard Hot 100 chart toppers (counting the Beatles' "I Feel Fine", carrying over from 1964) and the number one position on 28 of the 52 chart weeks belonged to British acts. The British trend would continue into 1966 and beyond. British Invasion acts also dominated the music charts at home in the United Kingdom.

The musical style of British Invasion artists, such as the Beatles, had been influenced by earlier American rock 'n' roll, a genre that had lost some popularity and appeal by the time of the Invasion. However, a subsequent handful of British performers, particularly the Rolling Stones and the Animals, would appeal to a more 'outsider' demographic, essentially reviving and popularising, for young people at least, a musical genre rooted in the blues, rhythm, and black culture, which had been largely ignored or rejected when performed by black American artists in the 1950s. Such bands were sometimes perceived by American parents and elders as rebellious and unwholesome, unlike parent-friendly pop groups such as the Beatles. The Rolling Stones would become the biggest band other than the Beatles to come out of the British Invasion, topping the Hot 100 eight times. Sometimes, there would be a clash between the two styles of the British Invasion, the polished pop acts and the grittier blues-based acts, due to the expectations set by the Beatles. Eric Burdon of the Animals said, "They dressed us up in the most strange costumes. They were even gonna bring a choreographer to show us how to move on stage. I mean, it was ridiculous. It was something that was so far away from our nature and, um, yeah we were just pushed around and told, 'When you arrive in America, don't mention the [Vietnam] war! You can't talk about the war.' We felt like we were being gagged."

"Freakbeat" is a term sometimes given to certain British Invasion acts closely associated with the Mod scene during the Swinging London period, particularly harder-driving British blues bands of the era that often remained obscure to American listeners, and who are sometimes seen as counterparts to the garage rock bands in America. Certain acts, such as the Pretty Things and the Creation, had a certain degree of chart success in the UK and are often considered exemplars of the form. The emergence of a relatively homogeneous worldwide "rock" music style marking the end of the "invasion" occurred in 1967.

== Other cultural impacts ==
Outside of music, other aspects of British arts and engineering, such as BSA motorcycles, became popular in the US during this period and led American media to proclaim the United Kingdom as the center of music and fashion.

=== Film and television ===
Julie [Andrews] became a movie queen by falling very smartly into step with the recent vogue in America for almost anything labeled British.

— Life magazine, April 1967.

The Beatles' A Hard Day's Night marked the group's entrance into film. The film Mary Poppins – starring English actress Julie Andrews as the titular character, and released on August 27, 1964 – became the most Oscar-winning and Oscar-nominated Disney film in history. My Fair Lady, released on December 25, 1964, starring British actress Audrey Hepburn as Cockney flower girl Eliza Doolittle, won eight Academy Awards. and Oliver! released in 1968, won Best Picture, becoming the final musical film to do so until Chicago in 2002.

Besides the Bond series that commenced with Sean Connery as James Bond in 1962, films with a British sensibility such as the "Angry Young Men" genre, What's New Pussycat? and Alfie styled London Theatre. A new wave of British actors such as Peter O'Toole, Michael Caine, and Peter Sellers intrigued US audiences. Four of the decade's Academy Award winners for best picture were British productions, with the epic Lawrence of Arabia, starring O'Toole as British army officer T. E. Lawrence, winning seven Oscars in 1963.

British television series such as Danger Man (renamed Secret Agent in its American airings), The Saint and The Avengers began appearing on American screens, inspiring a series of American-produced espionage programs such as I Spy, The Man from U.N.C.L.E. and the parody series Get Smart. By 1966, spy series (both British and American versions) had emerged as a favourite format of American viewers, along with Westerns and rural sitcoms. Television shows that featured uniquely American styles of music, such as Sing Along with Mitch and Hootenanny, were quickly canceled and replaced with shows such as Shindig! and Hullabaloo that were better positioned to play the new British hits, and segments of the new shows were taped in England.

=== Fashion ===
Fashion and image set the Beatles apart from their earlier American rock and roll counterparts. Their distinctive, uniform style "challenged the clothing style of conventional American males," just as their music challenged the earlier conventions of the rock and roll genre. "Mod" fashions, such as the miniskirt from "Swinging London" designers such as Mary Quant, and worn by early supermodels Twiggy, Jean Shrimpton and other models, were popular worldwide.

American newspaper columnist John Crosby wrote, "The English girl has an enthusiasm that American men find utterly captivating. I'd like to import the whole Chelsea girl with her 'life is fabulous' philosophy to America with instructions to bore from within."

Even while longstanding styles remained popular, American teens and young adults started to dress "hipper".

=== Literature ===
In anticipation of the 50-year anniversary of the British Invasion in 2013, comics such as Nowhere Men, which are loosely based on the events of it, gained popularity.

== Impact on American music ==
The Beatles changed music for everybody making records in America, including Elvis who couldn't get a hit during that period of time—a decent hit during that period of time. And they absolutely wiped us right off the charts. That was it. In '64, it was all over for American singers.

— Connie Francis, 2002

The British Invasion had a profound impact on popular music, internationalising the production of rock and roll, establishing the British popular music industry as a viable centre of musical creativity, and opening the door for subsequent British performers to achieve international success. In America, the Invasion arguably spelled the end of the popularity of instrumental surf music, pre-Motown vocal girl groups, the folk revival (which adapted by evolving into folk rock), teenage tragedy songs, Nashville country music (which also faced its own crisis with the deaths of some of its biggest stars at the same time), and temporarily, the teen idols that had dominated the United States charts in the late 1950s and early 1960s. It dented the careers of established R&B acts like Chubby Checker and temporarily derailed the chart success of certain surviving rock and roll acts, including Ricky Nelson, Fats Domino, the Everly Brothers, and Elvis Presley (who nevertheless racked up thirty Hot 100 entries from 1964 through 1967). It prompted many existing garage rock bands to adopt a sound with a British Invasion inflection and inspired many other groups to form, creating a scene from which many major US acts of the next decade would emerge. The British Invasion also played a major part in the rise of a distinct genre of rock music and cemented the primacy of the rock group, based around guitars and drums and producing their own material as singer-songwriters.

In February 2021, Ken Barnes, a former USA Today radio writer, analyzed US musical acts' success before and during the Invasion in an article for Radio Insight attempting to confirm or debunk the claim that the British Invasion devastated US music. In his analysis, he noted that several of the acts whose careers were eclipsed by the Invasion—among them Bobby Vee, Neil Sedaka, Dion and Elvis Presley—eventually made comebacks after the Invasion waned. Others, such as Bill Anderson and Bobby Bare, remained successful in the country realm, even as their pop crossover success had waned. Barnes noted that one record company, Cameo Parkway, sustained more permanent damage from the Invasion (and the concurrent rise of Motown) than any other, but also noted that it was also affected by another event that happened the same week as the Beatles' arrival: American Bandstand, which had been based in Philadelphia, Pennsylvania where Cameo Parkway was based and drew many of its performers from Cameo Parkway, moved to Los Angeles. In summation, he noted that a plurality of the alleged victims of the Invasion (42 percent of most US hit music acts of 1963) were already seeing diminishing returns in 1963 before the Invasion began; 24 percent of US acts that year saw their success continue through the invasion, such as the Beach Boys and the Four Seasons; 14 percent were the likes of Sedaka, Vee and Presley in that they suffered during the Invasion but recovered afterward; and 20 percent suffered fatal damage to their careers because of it (with Barnes stating that 7 percent of US acts—mostly Cameo Parkway acts and folk revival groups—were wiped out almost entirely due to the Invasion, and the other 13 percent had the Invasion as one of several reasons for their declines). Stylistically, the proportions of US music being made did not change substantially during the Invasion, even as the British acts flooded the charts with a homogenous pop-rock sound; folk, country and novelty music, already small factors in the overall pop realm, dropped to near-nonexistence, while girl groups were also hard hit.

Though many of the acts associated with the invasion did not survive its end, many others would become icons of rock music. The claim that British beat bands were not radically different from American groups like the Beach Boys and damaged the careers of black American and female artists was made about the invasion. However, the Motown sound, exemplified by the Supremes, the Temptations, and the Four Tops, each securing their first top 20 record during the invasion's first year of 1964 and following up with many other top 20 records, besides the constant or even accelerating output of the Miracles, Gladys Knight & the Pips, Marvin Gaye, Martha & the Vandellas, and Stevie Wonder, actually increased in popularity during that time.

Other American groups also demonstrated a similar sound to the British Invasion artists and in turn highlighted how the British "sound" was not in itself a wholly new or original one. Roger McGuinn of the Byrds, for example, acknowledged the debt that US artists owed to British musicians, such as the Searchers, but that "they were using folk music licks that I was using anyway. So it's not that big a rip-off." Both the US sunshine pop group the Buckinghams and the Beatles-influenced US Tex-Mex act the Sir Douglas Quintet adopted British-sounding names, and San Francisco's Beau Brummels took their name from the same-named English dandy. Roger Miller had a 1965 hit record with a self-penned song titled "England Swings", in which although its title references the progressive youth-centric cultural scene known as Swinging London, its lyric pays tribute to Britain's traditional way of life. Englishman Geoff Stephens (or John Carter) reciprocated the gesture à la Rudy Vallée a year later in the New Vaudeville Band's "Winchester Cathedral". Even as recently as 2003, Shanghai Knights made the latter two tunes memorable once again in London scenes. Anticipating the Bay City Rollers by more than a decade, two British acts that reached the Hot 100's top twenty gave a tip of the hat to America: Billy J. Kramer with the Dakotas and the Nashville Teens. The British Invasion also drew a backlash from some US bands, e.g., Paul Revere & the Raiders and New Colony Six dressed in Revolutionary War uniforms, and Gary Puckett & the Union Gap donned Civil War uniforms. Garage rock act the Barbarians' "Are You a Boy or Are You a Girl" contained the lyrics "You're either a girl, or you come from Liverpool" and "You can dance like a female monkey, but you swim like a stone, Yeah, a Rolling Stone."

In Australia, the success of the Seekers and the Easybeats (the latter a band formed mostly of British emigrants) closely paralleled that of the British Invasion. The Seekers had two Hot 100 top five hits during the British Invasion, the number-four hit "I'll Never Find Another You" (recorded at London's Abbey Road Studios) in May 1965 and the number-two hit "Georgy Girl" in February 1967. The Easybeats drew heavily on the British Invasion sound and had one hit in the US during the British Invasion, the number-sixteen hit "Friday on My Mind" in May 1967.

According to Robert J. Thompson, director of the Center for the Study of Popular Television at Syracuse University, the British invasion pushed the counterculture into the mainstream.

== End of the first British Invasion and aftermath ==
Beginning in March 1969 with the success of "These Eyes" by The Guess Who, the British Invasion was at least partially superseded by a Canadian Invasion, as Canadian musical acts, which had previously been overshadowed by their American and British counterparts, were about to benefit from new Canadian content regulations providing new opportunities. This began a wave of success on the American charts, with Canadian performers such as Edward Bear, Anne Murray, and Gordon Lightfoot among others. As cultural aspects of the British Invasion waned, British musical acts retained their popularity into the 1970s, competing with their US and Canadian counterparts. British progressive rock acts of the 1970s were often more popular in the US than at home, as the US working class was generally favorable to the virtuosity of progressive rock acts, while the bands' British audience was confined to the more genteel upper classes.

British bands such as Badfinger and The Sweet, and US band the Raspberries, are considered to have evolved the British Invasion movement into power pop. In 1978, two rock magazines published cover stories analyzing power pop as a saviour to both the new wave and the direct simplicity of rock. Along with the music, new wave and power pop impacted fashion, such as the mod revival style of the Jam or the skinny ties of the burgeoning Los Angeles scene. Several power pop artists were commercially successful; most notably the Knack, whose "My Sharona" was the highest-ranked US single of 1979. Although the Knack and power pop fell out of mainstream popularity, the genre continues to have a cult following with occasional periods of modest success.

A subsequent wave of British artists rose to popularity in the early 1980s as British music videos appeared in American media, leading to what is now known as the "Second British Invasion". Another wave of British mainstream prominence in US music charts came in the mid-1990s with the brief success of Spice Girls, Oasis, Blur, Radiohead and Robbie Williams. At least one British act would appear somewhere on the Hot 100 every week from November 2, 1963, until April 20, 2002, originating with the debut of the Caravelles' "You Don't Have to Be a Baby to Cry". British acts declined in popularity throughout the 1990s, and in the April 27, 2002, issue of Billboard, none of the songs on the Hot 100 were from British artists; that week, only two of the top 100 albums, those of Craig David and Ozzy Osbourne, were from British artists.

The latest movement came in the mid- to late 2000s, when British R&B and soul artists such as Amy Winehouse, Estelle, Joss Stone, Duffy, Natasha Bedingfield, Florence Welch, Adele, Floetry, Jessie J, Leona Lewis, Jay Sean and Taio Cruz enjoyed huge success in the US charts, which led to talk of a "Third British Invasion" or a "British Soul Invasion". Boyband One Direction have also been described as being a major part of a new "British Invasion" due to them being the first British band to have their debut album at number one on the United States charts along with their overall dominance in America.

== See also ==
- Anglophile
- Cool Britannia
- List of British Invasion artists
- Music of the United Kingdom (1960s)
- Second British Invasion, 1980s
- Third British Invasion, 2000s–2010s
- Fourth British Invasion, 2020s
- When Nirvana Came to Britain

== Further reading and listening ==
- Gilliland, John (1969). "The British Are Coming! The British Are Coming!: The U.S.A. is invaded by a wave of long-haired English rockers" (audio). Pop Chronicles. University of North Texas Libraries.
- Harry, Bill. The British Invasion: How the Beatles and Other UK Bands Conquered America. Chrome Dreams. 2004. ISBN 978-1-84240-247-4
- Miles, Barry. The British Invasion: The Music, the Times, the Era. Sterling Publishing. 2009. ISBN 978-1-4027-6976-4
- "The British Invasion" 2002 – oral history by Vanity Fair
