= The Vernons Girls =

English female choir (1958–1964)

The Vernons Girls were an English rock and roll, pop and musical ensemble of female vocalists. They were formed at the Vernons football pools company in the 1950s in Liverpool, settling down to a sixteen strong choir and recording an album of standards. They are Britain's first all girl rock and roll band.

== Career ==
The group was originally known as "The Voices of Vernons", and under that name appeared on Eamonn Andrews' BBC television series in 1957, seen by at least one critic as being a response to rival pools company Littlewoods' already-established vocal group the "Littlewood Songsters".

As a 16-piece vocal group, the renamed Vernons Girls appeared on the ITV show Oh Boy! with the house band between 1958 and 1959, and made a series of relatively successful singles for the label Parlophone between 1958 and 1961. Their 1958 LP released on Parlophone was arranged and conducted by Peter Knight, with sleeve notes by Eamonn Andrews. This record is significantly different from their later pop hits, featuring such fifties standards as "We'll Gather Lilacs", "Lonely Ballerina", and the "Cuckoo in the Clock".

Led by Maureen Kennedy, from 1961 the group reduced their membership to five and then three members, and by 1962 had signed to Decca Records where they recorded covers of American hits. Their cover of Clyde McPhatter's "Lover Please" and "You Know What I Mean" were both hits; the latter was also originally the B-side of "Lover Please". In the US, the group charted with the first Beatles tribute album there, We Love The Beatles. The Carefrees had previously charted with a Beatles tribute called "We Love You Beatles" in the UK in 1964.

As session singers for Decca, the Vernons Girls were the female backing voices on many hit singles during the 1960s – one of the first being Billy Fury's "Maybe Tomorrow". The trio of Jean Owen (aka Samantha Jones), Frances Lea, and Maureen Kennedy also appeared on film in the 1964 TV special Around The Beatles with the Beatles plus Long John Baldry, P. J. Proby and Millie Small, in the Billy Fury film Play It Cool, and in Just For Fun; ex-member Vicky Haseman also appeared in this, with her group, the Breakaways.

When Jean Owen left the group, she was replaced by Jane Sutton on lead vocals. The group's new lineup continued to make new recordings and television appearances.

However, by 1964, their chart successes had halted and they disbanded.

== Later careers ==
Some of the girls continued in show business ventures:

Lyn Cornell married session drummer Andy White (notable for replacing Ringo Starr on an early take of "Love Me Do"), and became a successful solo performer; having a chart hit with the title song to the film "Never on Sunday" in 1960 – and later becoming one of the Pearls.

Vicky Haseman formed the Breakaways, and married Joe Brown. Their daughter Sam Brown is a well-known singer in her own right.

Joyce Baker married Marty Wilde; they formed a trio with Justin Hayward called the Wilde Three, and were the parents of singers Ricky Wilde, Roxanne Wilde and Kim Wilde.

Jean Owen had solo success under the name Samantha Jones.

Other members of the group banded together in various combinations as duets and singing trios; these include the Redmond Twins, the Pearls, the Two Tones and the DeLaine Sisters. The DeLaine Sisters had a minor hit in the United Kingdom with the Goffin & King song "It Might As Well Rain Until September".

In 1966, six of the Vernons Girls reunited for a performance of the song "Short Shorts" on The ABC of ABC: A Souvenir With Music, a programme broadcast on 30 April that year marking the tenth anniversary of Oh Boy! producers ABC Weekend TV.

The group also appeared on the second episode of The Lily Savage Show, alongside Savage (Paul O'Grady in drag), singing a medley of two of their hits.

The longest surviving and best known of the groups, the Ladybirds, was formed by Maggie Stredder with Marian Davies and Gloria George. The Ladybirds are best known for their long association with The Benny Hill Show, and for performing the backing vocals on BBC television's Top of the Pops. They performed the backing vocals on the Jimi Hendrix Experience's first single, "Hey Joe".

More recently, Stredder and Sheila Bruce, together with ex-Ladybird Penny Lister, performed on tour with their friends as part of the 'Solid Gold Rock 'n' Roll Show'. In 1989, the Vernons Girls reformed to take part in a tribute to Oh Boy! at Cliff Richard's From a Distance: The Event concert at Wembley Stadium.

== Personnel ==
- Maggie Stredder (born Margaret Elisabeth Stredder, 9 January 1936, Birkenhead – died 9 March 2018). She married writer Roy Tuvey on 1 October 1966
- Vicki Brown (born Victoria Mary Haseman, 23 August 1940, Liverpool – died 16 June, 1991, Henley-on-Thames) – later in The Breakaways – married Joe Brown
- Joyce Smith (born Joyce Baker; May 1941) – married Marty Wilde, mother of Kim and Ricky Wilde
- Lyn Cornell (born 1940, Liverpool) – later in the Pearls – married Andy White
- Maureen Kennedy (born 3 July 1940, Liverpool, died c. 1970) – married comedian Mike Hope – she died in a car accident
- Jean Owen (born 17 November 1943, Liverpool) – performed under her real name with the group before going solo and changing her name into Samantha Jones. She married her long term adviser, showbiz accountant Jose Goumal
- Frances Lea (born 12 August 1939, St Helens, died 18 May 2014, Reading)
- Jane Sutton (born Annabell Skinner, 1 February 1942, Twickenham, Middlesex)
- Eileen Marina Byrne – (born in 1934, in Bootle, Liverpool, died in 1981 from breast cancer). She married William Percival Homewood (A submariner in The Royal Navy).
- Ann O'Brien (Simmons) – later in The Pearls
- Sybil Richardson – still singing and performing in 2011
- Elizabeth Isaac (born Elizabeth Liddy, 1936) – married John Robert Isaac (a dockyard engineer).
- Jean Ryder – a member of the group from 1958 to 1962, Ryder later married the songwriter Mike Hawker. She was also a member of The De Laine Sisters and The Breakaways She died in 2020 after a long illness.
- Margaret Shortell – Born 1941, Glossop, a member of the group from 1960, she eventually married and left the group. She died in 2016
- Dorothy Parkin aka Stevie Vernon born 1937, Liverpool; married Vernon Whitaker Ball (1934-2020) and left before 1960.
- Margaret "Peggy" Cleary (later Boden) - (born in 1934 in Liverpool, died in 2025). One the original members of the choir and then the group, Peggy later returned home to Liverpool to marry the boy next door, Harry Boden (telephone engineer) in 1963. The musical Vernons Girls - From the Pools to the Palladium was written about Peggy's life, which was performed at the Royal Court in Liverpool in 2023.
- Sallie (Sheila Mary) Sallis - born 1939, died Canberra, Australia 15 June 2012.

== Discography ==
=== UK singles ===
- "White Bucks and Saddle Shoes" / "Lost and Found" (Parlophone) (November 1958)
- "Jealous Heart" / "Now is the Month of Maying" (Parlophone) (March 1959)
- "Don't Look Now But" / "Who Are They To Say?" (Parlophone) (November 1959)
- "Boy Meets Girl" / "We Like Boys" (Parlophone) (January 1960)
- "Madison Time (with Jimmy Savile)" / "The Oo-We" (Parlophone) (13th May 1960)
- "Ten Little Lonely Boys" / "Anniversary Song" (Parlophone) (February 1961)
- "Let's Get Together" / "No Message" (Parlophone) (October 1961)
- "Lover Please" / "You Know What I Mean" (Decca) (19th April 1962) – UK No. 16
- "The Loco-Motion" / "Don't Wanna Go" (Decca) (17th August 1962) – UK No. 47
- "Funny All Over" / "See for Yourself" (Decca) (30th November 1962) – UK 31
- "Do The Bird" / "I'm Gonna Let My Hair Down" (Decca) (5th April 1963) – UK No. 44
- "He'll Never Come Back" / "Stay-At-Home" (Decca) (28th June 1963)
- "Tomorrow is Another Day" / "Why, Why, Why?" (Decca) (1963)
- "We Love the Beatles (Beatlemania)" / "Hey Lover Boy" (Decca) (3rd January 1964)
- "Only You Can Do It" / "Stupid Little Girl" (Decca) (24th April 1964)
- "It's a Sin to Tell a Lie" / "Don't Say Goodbye" (Decca) (13th November 1964)
- EP "The Vernons Girls" (Decca) (October 1962)
- LP The Vernons Girls (Parlophone) (March 1958)

== See also ==
- List of artists under the Decca Records label
