= Lyn Cornell =

English pop and jazz singer (born 1940)

- Also known as: Lynn Cornell
- Born: Audrey Cornett; 21 October 1936 (age 90); Anfield, Liverpool, England
- Genres: Pop, jazz
- Occupations: Singer, backing vocalist
- Instrument: Vocals
- Years active: Late 1950s–1970s
- Label: Decca Records

Lyn Cornell, sometimes billed as Lynn Cornell (born Audrey Cornett; 21 October 1936) is an English pop and jazz singer. She is best known for her membership of The Vernons Girls, The Carefrees and The Pearls, having had at least one chart hit with each group, and as a solo artist with a Top 30 UK hit to her name.

AllMusic noted that Cornell "could unfurl a suppleness of vocal gesture that was denied to luckier but less stylistically adventurous contemporaries".

== Biography ==
Cornell was born in Liverpool, England.

She was originally a member of The Vernons Girls, who appeared on the ITV show Oh Boy! with the house band between 1958 and 1959, and made a series of relatively successful singles for Parlophone between 1958 and 1961. Cornell launched her solo career in April 1960, before the Vernons reached their own disbanding in 1961. She recorded solo for Decca Records, and is best remembered for her version of the film title theme, "Never on Sunday". Her 1960 recording of "Never on Sunday" reached No. 30 in the UK Singles Chart. Cornell appeared in the edition of 25 November 1960 of the NME. Also in 1960, Cornell recorded and released as a single a Christmas song, "The Angel and the Stranger". In the summer of 1961, she performed at the North Pier Pavilion in Blackpool, on a bill including Matt Monro and Bert Weedon.

In April 1962, Cornell married session musician Andy White, the drummer on the album version of The Beatles' first hit, "Love Me Do". The same year, Decca released Cornell's version of "African Waltz", which failed to make inroads compared to John Dankworth's instrumental chart hit. The B-side was an arrangement of the Jon Hendricks penned jazz standard, "Moanin'", which showed her expanding well beyond traditional pop music boundaries. This release was followed by Jack Good's eccentric production work on her 1962 cover of The Blue Belles' US hit, "I Sold My Heart to the Junkman". Despite gaining airplay on the BBC Light Programme, it too did not match the chart appearance of "Never on Sunday". In 1963, Decca released Cornell's working of "Sally Go 'Round the Roses.

In 1964, she joined The Carefrees, who became best known for their song "We Love You Beatles". The track was The Carefrees first recording and only charted single, reaching No. 39 on the US Billboard Hot 100 and staying on the Billboard chart for five weeks. After one further single and an album, the group disbanded later in the same year.

Her television and film credits from this period include Shindig! (1964), Just for Fun (1963), Thank Your Lucky Stars (1962), Big Night Out (1961) and Parade (1960).

Cornell and White later divorced and she now lives in London. At one time she dated Adam Faith.

In 1972, Cornell and Ann Simmons (née O'Brien), who were both part of The Vernons Girls, had assistance from the record producer, Phil Swern, in forming The Pearls. They were a 1970s girl vocal duo. The Pearls released a total of 12 singles, the most successful being "Guilty", which reached No. 10 in the UK Singles Chart in June 1974.

Cornell later worked as a singer with the James Last Orchestra. In 1975, she provided backing vocals on Polly Brown's album, Special Delivery.
