= Around the Beatles =

1964 television special featuring the Beatles

- The Beatles during the special
- Genre: TV special
- Directed by: Rita Gillespie
- Starring: The Beatles; Long John Baldry; P. J. Proby; The Vernons Girls; Cilla Black; Sounds Incorporated; Millie

Production
- Producer: Jack Good

Original release
- Network: ITV
- Release: 6 May 1964

Around the Beatles is a 1964 television special featuring the Beatles, produced by Jack Good for ITV/Rediffusion London. It was taped in Wembley Park Studios (now Fountain Studios) in London on 28 April 1964, and broadcast internationally, with its initial airing on 6 May 1964, in Australia on 6 June 1964 on the ATN network and the US on the ABC network on 15 November. The show features other performers as well, with the Beatles providing backing vocals for some of them. The music had been pre-recorded at London's IBC Studios on 19 April 1964, and the Beatles mimed during the show.

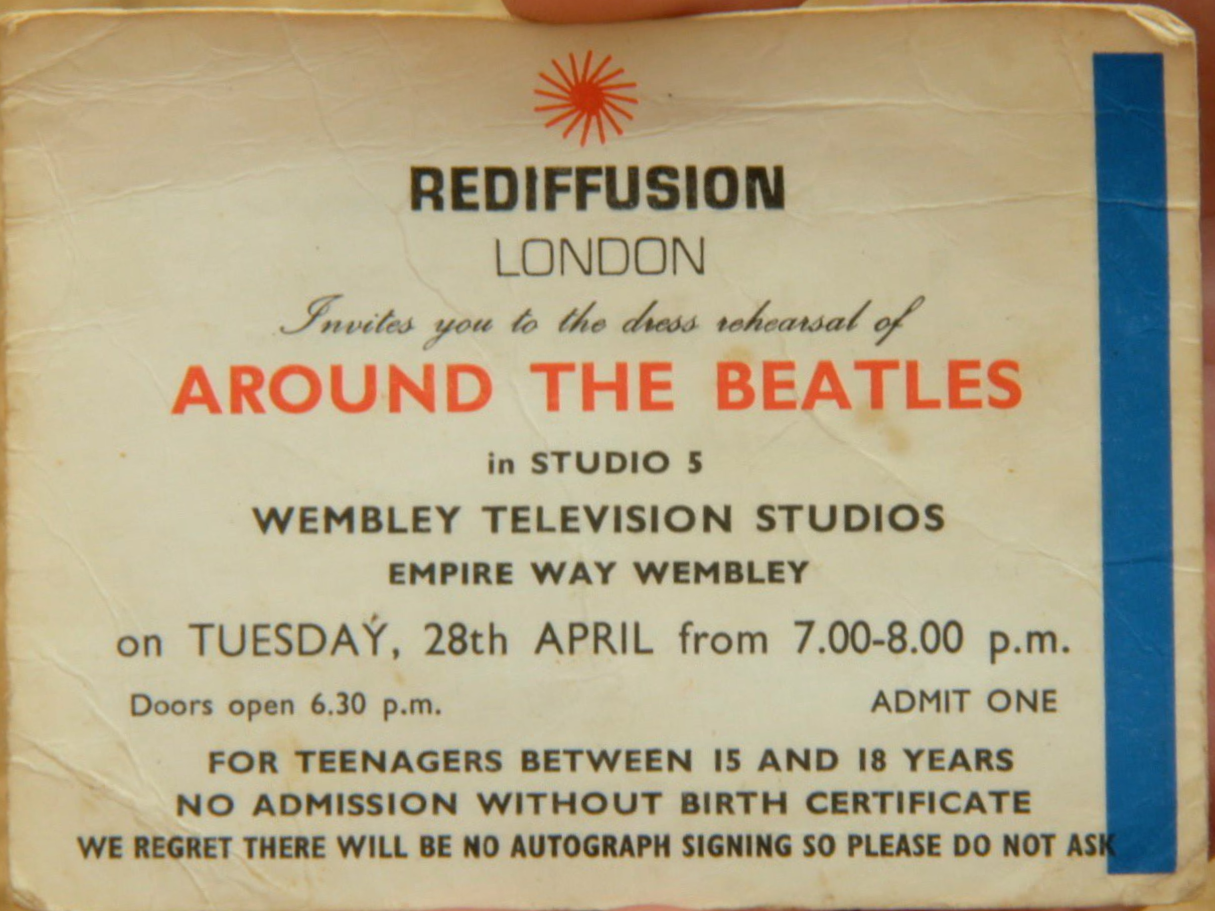
An audience ticket from the dress rehearsal

== Performances ==
The show opens on an image of the Globe Theatre, with Ringo Starr unfurling a flag with the legend "Around the Beatles". The studio setting is arranged as a theatre in the round, (hence the show's name) echoing the seating arrangement of the Globe. The opening act is a humorous rendition of the play within a play, Pyramus and Thisbe (Act V, Scene I) from William Shakespeare's A Midsummer Night's Dream, with Paul McCartney as Pyramus, John Lennon as his lover Thisbe, George Harrison as Moonshine, and Ringo Starr as Lion, and also features Trevor Peacock in the role of Quince.

=== The Beatles ===
- "Twist and Shout"
- "Roll Over Beethoven"
- "I Wanna Be Your Man"
- "Long Tall Sally"
- "Love Me Do/Please Please Me/From Me to You/She Loves You/I Want to Hold Your Hand" (Medley)
- "Can't Buy Me Love"
- "Shout"

=== Other acts ===
- Long John Baldry: "Got My Mojo Working" (with the Beatles as backup singers offstage in the audience balcony)
- P. J. Proby with the Vernons Girls: "Walking the Dog", "Cumberland Gap", "I Believe"
- The Vernons Girls featuring Jean Owen, "Only You Can Do It"
- Baldry and Vernons Girls, Medley: "Night Train/Lover Please/I'm Movin' On/Forty Days/Money (That's What I Want)/Hit the Road Jack"
- Cilla Black: "Saved", "You're My World", "Heat Wave"
- Sounds Incorporated: "Brontosaurus Stomp", "Detroit" (also shown providing backing on some performances other than the Beatles')
- Millie: "My Boy Lollipop", "Tom Hark"

== Production ==
- Harry Robinson – musical associate
- Brian Epstein – production associate
- Roy Stannard – designer
- Rita Gillespie – director
- Jack Good – producer

== Legacy ==
The special was released as a bootleg video by Media Home Entertainment. A video segment from the special appears in The Beatles Anthology documentary film. Songs from the special appear on the Anthology 1 compilation in stereo. The Beatles' musical set features the only recorded performance of "Shout" by the group. The footage of them singing "Can't Buy Me Love" is now included on the video portion of the 2015 reissue of the compilation 1. All of the songs performed by the Beatles in the special were released on home video in 1985 by EMI and Dave Clark Productions as "Ready Steady Go! Special Edition The Beatles Live!", which was available on VHS and Beta formats and later on an 8" LaserDisc. The complete show is known still to exist, but has never been commercially released on VHS or DVD (apart from the previously mentioned Beatles segments.)

In March 2019, an original ticket for the show's dress rehearsal was valued at £100 on the BBC television show Antiques Roadshow.
