= The Pearls =

1970s English vocal duo

- Origin: England
- Genre: Pop
- Years active: 1972–1978
- Labels: Bell, Private Stock, Handkerchief, Ebony
- Past members: Lyn Cornell; Ann Simmons

The Pearls were an English 1970s girl vocal duo from Liverpool, England, featuring Lyn Cornell and Ann Simmons (née O'Brien). They released a total of 12 singles, the most successful being "Guilty", which reached No. 10 in the UK Singles Chart in June 1974. Various Pearls singles were released around the world with different catalogue numbers and sometimes different labels. They had releases throughout Europe and in the Far East, USA, Canada, South Africa, Japan, New Zealand and Australia.

== Career ==
Cornell and Simmons were originally part of The Vernons Girls and with assistance from the record producer, Phil Swern formed The Pearls in 1972. After her time with the Vernons, Cornell who had dated Adam Faith became a solo singer and had minor success with "Never on a Sunday" and a Christmas song "The Angel and the Stranger". Cornell's 1960 recording of "Never on Sunday" reached No. 30 in the UK Singles Chart.

The Pearls' first records were cover versions of the 1960s songs "Third Finger Left Hand" (a b-side from the Martha and the Vandellas hit single "Jimmy Mack"), The Ronettes "You Came, You Saw, You Conquered" and their take on the Stylistics track "You Are Everything ". They all made the UK top 50. The next single in 1973 was "Yo Yo" a fast paced pop song written and recorded previously by Chris Andrews. These records were issued by Bell Records. However the vocal on the first single issued by The Pearls was not performed by Cornell and Simmons. It was the duo Sue and Sunny – Sue Glover and Sunny Leslie – who sang on "Third Finger Left Hand" as stated on The Pearls compilation album. Sue and Sunny could not front The Pearls when the record was released because they had previous contractual obligations. There were a total of seven singles issued on the Bell label .

The Pearls' original songs included "Let's Make Love Again", "Doctor Love" and "Wizard of Love" among others though they all just failed to make the UK Top 50. They had more success with another original song which was their only non-cover to chart. "Guilty" was co-written by Ron Roker and became a UK Top 10 success in 1974. Their previously unreleased cover of The Everly Brothers, "Bye Bye Love" appeared on their compilation album, A String of Pearls.

In 1975 The Pearls changed label to Private Stock releasing three singles over the next two years. The first release "Lead Us Not into Temptation" was an original song but the next two were covers. "The Cheater" which had been a 1960s success stateside for Bob Kuban was a popular play on the Northern soul circuit and their last single for Private Stock was a disco version of "I'll See You in My Dreams" which was also issued in the United States as a longer version 10" DJ single. This longer version was also released in France on the regular 7" vinyl single format, though all other territories including the UK got only the short version on 7" vinyl, which is also the one featured on both CD compilations from 2005 and 2023.

Following the three Private Stock releases, The Pearls released two more singles both new original songs. The first was "Let's Make Love Again" in September 1976 on the Handkerchief label and their final release "Double Trouble" came early in 1978 on the Ebony label. Both singles failed to find the success of their earlier recordings.

In March 2023, a new compilation of The Pearls music was released in the United States. This 2023 collection on the Renaissance label is titled Anthology and contains 22 songs which are all featured on the 24 track CD compilation from 2005. Track 17 is listed in error as "Deeper In Love Again" and is "Deeper In Love With You". The two songs not included this time are "Bye Bye Love" and "Let's Make Love Again".

Both Cornell and Simmons were also session and backing singers as detailed in the liner notes of their compilation album. They belonged at various stages of their careers to other groups. Cornell who had been a solo singer both prior to joining The Vernons Girls and after was also a member of The Breakaways, The Ladybirds, The Chucks, The Carefrees and The Raindrops. She also sang and toured with the James Last Orchestra during the entire time she was a member of The Pearls and for many years afterwards. Simmons as well as her time with The Vernons Girls was a member of The Redmond Twins, The Breakaways, The Ladybirds and The Anita Kerr Singers during her career.

Cornell married session musician Andy White; the drummer on the album version of The Beatles' first hit "Love Me Do". Cornell and White later divorced and she now lives in London.

== Discography ==
=== Singles ===
Release date	Title	AUS	NZ	UK	Label
17 March 1972	"Third Finger Left Hand"/ "Little Lady Love Me"	-	-	31	Bell
11 August 1972	"You Came, You Saw, You Conquered" / "Sing Out to Me"	-	-	32	Bell
19 January 1973	"You Are Everything" / "She Say He Say"	-	-	41	Bell
8 June 1973	"Yo Yo" / "Deeper in Love With You"	-	-	-	Bell
26 April 1974	"Guilty" / "I'll Say It Over Again"	76	-	10	Bell
9 August 1974	"Wizard of Love" / "Playing Around"	-	-	51 (Note: Chart position is from the official UK "Breakers List".)	Bell
10 January 1975	"Doctor Love" / "Pass It On"	95	35	55	Bell
18 July 1975	"Lead Us Not into Temptation" / "Love Sensation"	-	-	-	Private Stock
17 October 1975	"The Cheater" / "I'm Gonna Steal Your Heart Away"	-	-	-	Private Stock
6 February 1976	"I'll See You in My Dreams" / "Pearly"	-	-	-	Private Stock
10 September 1976	"Let's Make Love Again" / "We Can Make It Baby"	-	-	-	Handkerchief
24 February 1978	"Double Trouble" / "One in the Eye for Love"	-	-	-	Ebony

=== Albums ===
- A String of Pearls (CD July 2005 by Rev-Ola Records)
1. "Lead Us Not into Temptation" – (Roger Greenaway, Tony Macaulay) 2:52
2. "Third Finger, Left Hand" – (Holland–Dozier–Holland) 2:31
3. "Yo Yo" – (Chris Andrews) 2:45
4. "You Came, You Saw, You Conquered" – (Irwin Levine, Phil Spector, Toni Wine) 2:39
5. "Guilty" – (Ron Roker, Gerry Shury) 3:03
6. "Sing Out to Me" – (Johnny Arthey, Phil Swern) 2:51
7. "Pass It On" – (Johnny Arthey, Phil Swern) 2:26
8. "You Are Everything" – (Thom Bell, Linda Creed) 2:40
9. "She Say, He Say" – (Johnny Arthey, Phil Swern) 2:24
10. "Deeper in Love with You" – (Johnny Arthey, Phil Swern) 2:48
11. "Wizard of Love" – (Gerry Shury, Phil Swern) 3:25
12. "I'll Say It Over Again" – (Johnny Arthey, Phil Swern) 2:25
13. "Doctor Love" – (Biddu) 2:35
14. "Playing Around" – (Johnny Arthey, Phil Swern) 2:26
15. "Love Sensation" – (Biddu, Phil Swern) 3:13
16. "The Cheater" – (Mike Krenski) 2:52
17. "I'll See You in My Dreams" – (Isham Jones, Gus Kahn) 3:02
18. "Let's Make Love Again" – (Mel Taggart, Ray Roberts) 3:43
19. "I'm Gonna Steal Your Heart Away" – (Biddu, Phil Swern) 3:20
20. "We Can Make It Baby" – (Lyn Cornell, Richard Hewson) 2:13
21. "Double Trouble" – (Gerry Shury, Phil Swern) 2:56
22. "One in the Eye for Love" – (Gerry Shury, Phil Swern) 3:29
23. "Bye Bye Love" – (Felice and Boudleaux Bryant) 2:07 (*)
24. "A Lover's Concerto" – (Sandy Linzer, Denny Randell) 2:43 (*)

The CD in one of a number of errors lists track 18 as "Pearly" the instrumental B-side of "I'll See You in My Dreams". "Pearly" was credited to "The Pearls Orchestra". The track is actually "Let's Make Love Again" which the liner notes said was unobtainable. The other instrumental also not included on the CD was the B-side of the first single "Third Finger Left Hand" and titled "Little Lady Love Me". This track was credited to "The Rhythm of the Pearls".

The final two tracks (*) were available on this CD for the first time.
