= Andy White (drummer) =

Scottish drummer (1930–2015)

- White at Skidmore College in 2006

Background information
- Born: Andrew McLuckie White; 27 July 1930; Stranraer, Scotland
- Died: 9 November 2015 (aged 85) Caldwell, New Jersey, U.S.
- Genres: Pop/rock, rock and roll, swing
- Occupation: Musician
- Instruments: Drums, percussion
- Years active: 1950s–1970s

Andrew McLuckie White (27 July 1930 – 9 November 2015) was a Scottish drummer, primarily a session musician. He is best known for temporarily replacing Ringo Starr on drums for the Beatles' first single, "Love Me Do". White was featured on the American 7" single release of the song, which also appeared on the band's debut British album, Please Please Me. He also played on "P.S. I Love You", which was the B-side of "Love Me Do".

White played with other prominent musicians and groups both in the United Kingdom and the United States, including Chuck Berry, Billy Fury, Herman's Hermits and Tom Jones. AllMusic called White "one of the busier drummers in England from the late 1950s through the mid-1970s".

== Early life and early career ==
Andrew McLuckie White was born in Stranraer on 27 July 1930, the son of a baker. At the age of 12, he started playing drums in a pipe band, and became a professional session musician at the age of 17. In the 1950s and early 1960s, White played drums with a number of swing and traditional jazz groups and musicians. In 1958 he formed a big band jazz outfit and took it to the American Northeast where he backed rockers like Chuck Berry, the Platters and Bill Haley & His Comets.

White said, "We used some big band arrangements and put a back beat to it to fit in with the rock 'n' roll thing. I got the chance to hear rock 'n' roll in the flesh. That was where I got a good idea about what it was supposed to happen, drumwise." In 1960 in London White recorded with Billy Fury on Fury's first album, The Sound of Fury, which is generally regarded as Britain's first rock and roll album.

In the early 1960s White lived in Thames Ditton and was married to the British Decca artist Lyn Cornell, who later became a member of the Vernons Girls, the Pearls, and also the Carefrees, who had the biggest selling Beatles novelty single ever with "We Love You Beatles," peaking in the U.S. at No. 39 and staying on the Billboard charts for five weeks.

== The Beatles ==
In September 1962, White received a call from producer Ron Richards asking him to attend a Beatles recording session at the EMI Studios at Abbey Road in London. Richards was record producer George Martin's assistant at the time and had used White in the past. The Beatles had recorded "Love Me Do" twice already: at an EMI session on 6 June 1962 with Pete Best on drums when he was still a member of the group; and again on 4 September 1962, now with Ringo Starr on drums, having replaced Best the previous month.

Martin had disapproved of Best's drumming and was still unhappy with newcomer Starr's drumming. On 11 September 1962, Richards, who was in charge of recording that day, wanted the song recorded again, and the Beatles played "Love Me Do" a third time, this time with White replacing Starr on drums and Starr relegated to playing tambourine. "P.S. I Love You" was also recorded during this session with White playing a "lightweight cha-cha-chá beat" on bongos rather than drums and Starr playing maracas. White says he was paid £5 for the session and 10 shillings for bringing his drum kit, and did not earn any royalties from the sale of the records.

The version of "Love Me Do" with Starr playing drums was used on the early British pressings of the single in 1962. The version with White on drums was used on the first American pressings of the single in 1964, all later releases of the single, on the Beatles' debut British album, Please Please Me, in 1963, and most subsequent albums that included the song. The version with Starr on drums has also been reissued on occasion; it appears on the Rarities (1980) compilation, which was released in North America, and received worldwide release on the Past Masters compilation in 1988.

A 1992 single includes both the Starr and White versions. An easy way to distinguish between the two versions is that White's version features Starr on tambourine; Starr's version does not include a tambourine. The Pete Best version of the song, initially thought to be lost, was released for the first time on Anthology 1 (1995). "P.S. I Love You", with White drumming, was released on the "B" side of the "Love Me Do" single, and on the Please Please Me album.

In a 2012 BBC interview, White claimed that during the 11 September session he also played on a recording of "Please Please Me", and that this performance was used on the hit single: "From the drum sound I can tell that I was on it, because it was a vastly different sound to Ringo's drumset at that time. This was before he got the Ludwig kit. Each drummer gets an individual sound, first of all by the way they tune the drums and then by the way they play the drums." In any case, he did not participate in the final recording on 26 November, and was only hired for the 11 September session.

This was the only time White played with the Beatles, but it was enough to get him "into the history books", and the distinction of being one of the so-called "fifth Beatles". White said that on that day in the studio the only members of the Beatles he worked with were Paul McCartney and John Lennon, because they were the songwriters. "They didn't use any written music, and what I had to do was play the routines with them to get an idea what they wanted before we could even start recording."

== Other projects ==
Later, White played on hit records by Herman's Hermits, on Tom Jones's hit song "It's Not Unusual" and on "Shout" by Lulu. He also worked with many other musicians and groups, including Rod Stewart, Anthony Newley, Bert Weedon and the BBC Scottish Radio Orchestra in Glasgow. In the mid-1960s White toured the United States with Marlene Dietrich and performed in her cabaret shows, under the musical direction of the then-unknown composer Burt Bacharach, and, from 1965 until he retired in 1975, the British pianist and composer William Blezard.

White played drums on "P.S. I Love You" again in 2008, this time on a version by a New Jersey–based rock band, the Smithereens. In 2007 the band had recorded Meet the Smithereens!, a tribute to the Beatles, covering their entire Meet the Beatles! album. After Beatles expert Tom Frangione introduced White to the band, they asked White to record with them on their next Beatles tribute album at The Grip Weeds' House of Vibes recording studio in Highland Park. White's drumming on "P.S. I Love You" was released late in 2008 on B-Sides The Beatles, an album of Beatles B-side covers from 1962 to 1965. A Smithereens version of "Love Me Do" with White was also recorded during the session, but was left unreleased until a 2020 single release. White also played drums with the Smithereens in May 2008 at a We Get By with a Little Help from Our Friends charity health-care fundraiser at the Paper Mill Playhouse in Millburn.

In the late 1980s White moved to United States and lived in Caldwell, New Jersey, where he taught Scottish pipe band drumming. He was also a judge for the Eastern United States Pipe Band Association (EUSPBA), and drum instructor for the Kearny, New Jersey based St. Columcille United Gaelic Pipe band and the New York City Department of Corrections Emerald Society Pipe Band. He also played with St. Columcille for many years up until his death.

He was married to Thea White, a librarian who supplied the voice of Muriel on the Cartoon Network show Courage the Cowardly Dog. White had a bumper sticker on his car that read "5THBEATLE". He said that "One of my students gave that to me."

== Death ==
White died after a stroke at his home in Caldwell, New Jersey, on 9 November 2015 at the age of 85.

== Works cited ==
- Ingham, Chris (2003). The rough guide to the Beatles (Illustrated ed.). Rough Guides. ISBN 1-84353-140-2.
- Margotin, Philippe; Guesdon, Jean-Michel (2014). All The Songs: The Story Behind Every Beatles Release. Hachette Books. ISBN 978-1-60376-371-4.
