= Samantha Jones (singer) =

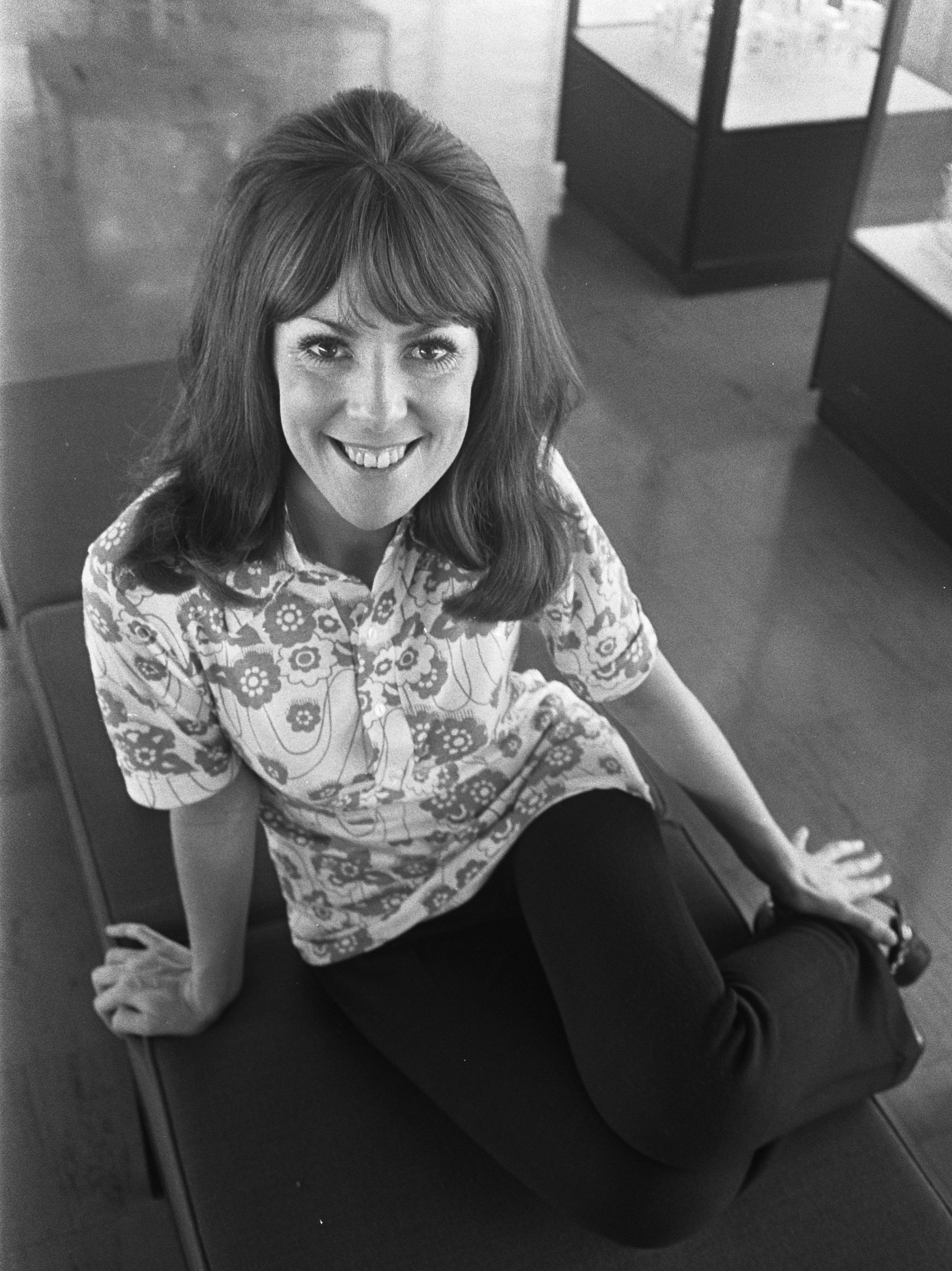
- Samantha Jones in 1970

Background information
- Born: Jean Owen; 17 November 1943 (age 82)
- Origin: Liverpool, England, UK
- Genres: pop, Northern soul
- Occupation: Singer
- Years active: 1961–1986
- Labels: United Artists, Penny Farthing

Jean Owen (born 17 November 1943), known as Samantha Jones is a former English singer whose career spanned the mid-1960s through the early 1980s. She won three international pop music contests and charted records in the Benelux countries. Her recordings later experienced a revival on the Northern soul scene.

== Biography ==
Jean Owen started her career in 1961 as part of popular English vocal group The Vernons Girls. During her time with the group, the line-up went from sixteen members to just three girls. The Vernons Girls enjoyed a couple of top 40 hits, including "Lover Please", "Only You Can Do It," (also released by Françoise Hardy) and recorded one of the first Beatles tribute songs, "We Love The Beatles". They also opened for The Beatles several times and appeared with them in a 1964 TV special, Around The Beatles.

In 1964, with the help of producer Charles Blackwell, Owen embarked on a solo career and signed with the international record label United Artists, who gave her the stage name Samantha Jones. Her first TV performance as a solo performer was a duet with Long John Baldry on 20 November 1964; the Vernons Girls had previously backed him on Around the Beatles. She released several unsuccessful 45s (amongst them "Surrounded by a Ray of Sunshine," later a staple on the Northern soul circuit). Two of Jones' songs were covered by Françoise Hardy and released on the LP known as L'Amitié.

In 1965 she took part in the Venice ''Mostra Internazionale di Musica Leggera'' with song ''Un uomo forte non si arrende''.

In 1967, two of Samantha Jones's performances were included in the soundtrack of the film The Vengeance of Fu Manchu. Her first album Call It Samantha was released in US only in 1968.

Jones switched to UK label Penny Farthing in 1969 and recorded her second album A Girl Named Sam with the producer Mark Wirtz. The performance of one of the tracks, the chugging "Today (Without You)" brought Samantha Jones the Grand Prix of the Radio-Télé Luxembourg in October 1969 and charted in Belgium and the Netherlands. A year later, Jones won the music festival held in Knokke-Heist with a version of "My Way", which subsequently reached No. 4 on the Dutch charts. In 1988, the track was included in the compilation album World Stars – 28 Greatest Artists of the World.

On 15 July 1970, Samantha Jones made a guest appearance on The Morecambe & Wise Show, performing "You've Got Your Troubles". Later that year, she released her third LP The Other Jones. Samantha Jones appeared on the edition of 5 June 1971 of Disco aired in West Germany on the ZDF network. Her success in continental Europe continued with winning the 1st prize in the Sopot International Song Festival held in 26–29 August 1971 in Poland. In 1973, she recorded the song "Man Is a Hunter" for the film Commuter Husbands. After that, she switched labels again, this time to EMI, and released two albums with the veteran producer Walter J. Ridley.

By then, Jones had become a known cabaret act and performed on cruise ships including the Queen Elizabeth 2. All the while, Samantha Jones sang on numerous BBC radio shows. In 1982, the Dutch label Dureco released the album Goin' Places. She stopped singing in 1986 and became a producer placing numerous musical production shows on cruise lines until she sold her interest in the mid-1990s. In 1986 she became close to showbiz accountant Jose Goumal (who had been her professional adviser since 1970), they moved in together and married in 1998. Today, Jean Owen lives with her husband in London and Henley-on-Thames.

== Discography ==
=== Albums ===
- 1968 Call It Samantha US only
- 1970 A Girl Named Sam
- 1970 The Other Jones
- 1972 My Way (compilation LP)
- 1974 Sing It Again Sam
- 1976 The Lady Likes It Latin
- 1982 Goin' Places

=== Singles ===
- 1964 "It's All Because of You"
- 1965 "Don't Come Any Closer"
- 1965 "Chained to a Memory"
- 1965 "Kinky Dolly"
- 1966 "I Deserve It"
- 1966 "Shoes"
- 1966 "That Special Way"
- 1967 "Why Can't I Remember (To Forget You)"
- 1967 "Surrounded By a Ray of Sunshine"
- 1968 "Lovely Lonely Man"
- 1968 "And Suddenly"
- 1968 "Ford leads the way" b/w "Go ahead"
- 1969 "Today Without You"
- 1969 "Do I Still Figure in Your Life"
- 1970 "My Way"
- 1970 "Best of Both Worlds"
- 1971 "No Regrets"
- 1971 "One More Mountain"
- 1972 "Don't Hang No Haloes on Me"
- 1974 "I Believed It All"
- 1982 "Living for You"
