= The Ladybirds =

British female vocal harmony trio (1962–2005)

- The Ladybirds performing on The Benny Hill Show in 1970. Left to right: Marian Davies, Maggie Stredder and Gloria George

Background information
- Origin: England
- Genre: Popular
- Years active: 1962–2005
- Label: Various
- Past members: Maggie Stredder; Marian Davies; Barbara Moore; Gloria George; Penny Lister; Ann Simmons; Laura Lee; Tracy Miller; Joan Baxter; Kay Garner; Vicki Robinson; Sylvia King

The Ladybirds were a British female vocal harmony trio. They were long-standing backing vocalists to many established artists, and perennial television performers, especially in the 1960s and 1970s.

== Career ==
The Ladybirds had their origins in an earlier vocal group, the Vernons Girls. The original Vernons Girls disbanded at the start of the 1960s, but a smaller unit carried on, headed by Maureen Kennedy. Most of the other members performed as duos and singing trios. Amongst them were the Redmond Twins, the Breakaways, the Pearls, the DeLaine Sisters, and the longest surviving and best known, the Ladybirds.

Founding member Margaret Elizabeth "Maggie" Stredder and Jean Ryder, billed as the Two Tones, appeared at United States Air Force bases in Germany, before returning to the UK to join Max Bygraves on stage. In 1962, following an appearance on the Val Doonican TV Special, Marian Davies had replaced Ryder, plus Gloria George was added, and The Ladybirds were born.

After signing to Decca Records in August 1965, Marc Bolan recorded his debut single. The Ladybirds sang backing vocals, while apart from Bolan's vocals, all other music was created by studio session musicians. "The Wizard" was released on 19 November 1965.

In 1966, the Ladybirds were recruited to provide vocal backing on BBC Television's Top of the Pops programme. (They continued in this role until 10 August 1978, when they were replaced a week later by the Maggie Stredder Singers.) They also appeared on a number of Twiggy's television shows. Also in 1966, they were backing singers on the Mood Mosaic track "A Touch of Velvet – A Sting of Brass" – later to become the theme tune of Beat-Club and its successor Musikladen, as well as Radio Caroline disc jockey Dave Lee Travis' signature tune.

The Ladybirds sang backing vocals on Sandie Shaw's 1967 British number one hit "Puppet on a String", joining Shaw for live performances in Vienna, Austria, when the song won the Eurovision Song Contest, as well as on records by Rolf Harris, Des O'Connor and many other artists.

In 1969, when Benny Hill joined Thames Television, he recruited them to The Benny Hill Show. They participated in over 60 episodes between 1968 and 1991. The Ladybirds' first number was "Goin' Out of My Head". In 1971, Hill did a spoof of Top of the Pops, titled "Top of the Tops", but unusually, the Ladybirds were not on that programme. Instead, one of the musical guests, Petticoat & Vine, appeared in the sketch. The Ladybirds' later Broadway medley was unique in that each member sang independently, i.e. Stredder ("Don't Bring Lulu"), George ("I Won't Dance"), and Davies ("I Wanna Be Loved by You"). After that point, George left the trio.

On the May 1973 album release Rigor Mortis Sets In by John Entwistle, the Ladybirds were credited as the backing vocalists.

Up until 1973, the Ladybirds remained as a working trio of Gloria George, Maggie Stredder and Marian Davies. Penny Lister was then recruited for a short tenure. From the mid-1970s until 1986, the regular members became Stredder, Ann Simmons, who was another former Vernons Girl, and Laura Lee. Simmons later joined the Pearls.

The Ladybirds also returned to Eurovision, backing Olivia Newton-John, singing on "Long Live Love", in the 1974 contest staged in Brighton, England. However, Ann Simmons was misidentified as her predecessor Gloria George.

The Ladybirds appeared on many light entertainment shows on UK TV; the first series of Cilla in 1968, Lulu's Back in Town, The Les Dawson Show, The Two Ronnies, Morecambe and Wise, The Tommy Cooper Show, Little and Large, Shirley Bassey, The Paul Daniels Magic Show, The Generation Game and Children in Need, as well as an appearance on The Glen Campbell Goodtime Hour in the United States. However, by 1978, when they returned to The Benny Hill Show purely as backing vocalists rather than actual performers, they also had stopped appearing on Top of the Pops. In 1977, the Ladybirds recorded songs for a low budget covers album. Tracks featured included "Chanson D'Amour", "Yes Sir, I Can Boogie" and "Don't Cry for Me, Argentina". The music compelled the all-female group to tackle songs made famous by male singers. 1977 was also the third and last time the group backed the UK entry in the Eurovision Song Contest, "Rock Bottom" performed by Lynsey de Paul and Mike Moran.

On occasion, Tracy Miller and Joan Baxter boosted the Ladybird ranks. In 1979, they all provided backing vocals work on the Max Bygraves album, Discolongamax. The Ladybirds also sang on several orchestral albums by Benny Hill's Thames TV musical director, Ronnie Aldrich.

In 2005, they appeared one more time on Mark Wirtz's Ear Theatre album Love Is Eggshaped: The Soundtrack. The track "Withdrawal" had vocals by the Ladybirds (by this time comprising Stredder, Kay Garner and Vicki Robinson).

The Vernons Girls reformed as a trio after being invited to appear on the Cliff Richard 30th Anniversary Concert at Wembley Stadium, playing over the two evenings to an audience of 144,000. In more recent times, Stredder, Sheila Bruce and Penny Lister, reappeared billed as the Vernons Girls.

Stredder later launched a successful career as an after dinner speaker, recalling her life in show business. She died on 9 March 2018, aged 82.

== Personnel ==
- Maggie Stredder (born Margaret Elisabeth Stredder, 9 January 1936, Birkenhead – died 9 March 2018) She married writer Roy Tuvey on 1 October 1966
- Marian Davies (born 23 November 1937, Crynant, Wales – died 24 January 2008, London) – often misspelled Marion Davies
- Gloria George
- Penny Lister (born in Huddersfield, currently living in Dorset). Also appeared in a 1977 Doctor Who serial, The Talons of Weng-Chiang, as a singer
- Ann Simmons (born Ann O'Brien, 20 November 19xx)
- Laura Lee (born Isabella McIntyre, 11 May 1937, Musselburgh, Scotland – died July 2007 at home in Musselburgh)
- Tracy Miller
- Barbara Moore (born 1932 – died 26 August 2021, Bognor Regis)
- Joan Baxter
- Kay Garner (born 4 October 1943, Hull, Yorkshire – died 16 July 2007)
- Vicki Robinson
- Sylvia King (real name Sylvia Rosen)

== See also ==
- Mood Mosaic
