= You Came, You Saw, You Conquered =

"You Came, You Saw, You Conquered!"

Single by the Ronettes
- B-side: "Oh, I Love You"
- Released: March 1969
- Genre: Pop
- Length: 2:50
- Label: A&M
- Songwriters: Phil Spector, Toni Wine, Irwin Levine
- Producer: Phil Spector

The Ronettes singles chronology
"I Can Hear Music" (1966)	"You Came, You Saw, You Conquered!" (1969)	"Lover, Lover" (1973)

"You Came, You Saw, You Conquered!" is a 1969 song by the Ronettes. It was their final charting U.S. hit, reaching No. 108 Billboard and No. 92 Cash Box. In Canada, the song peaked at No. 73 for two weeks. It was the first of a series of non-album single releases by the group.

The title of the song is a reference to 'Veni, vidi, vici', a Latin phrase popularly attributed to Julius Caesar, who is said to have used the phrase in a letter to the Roman Senate after he had achieved a swift, conclusive victory in battle.

== The Pearls cover ==
"You Came, You Saw, You Conquered"

Single by the Pearls
- B-side: "Sing Out to Me"
- Released: 11 August 1972
- Genre: Pop
- Length: 2:40
- Label: Bell
- Songwriters: Phil Spector, Toni Wine, Irvine Levine
- Producers: Phillip Swern, Johnny Arthey

The Pearls singles chronology
"Third Finger Left Hand" (1972)	"You Came, You Saw, You Conquered" (1972)	"You Are Everything" (1973)

In 1972, "You Came, You Saw, You Conquered" was covered by the British female duo the Pearls, reaching the Top 40 in the UK. Like the Ronettes' version, their record was also a non-album single. The song was, however, included on a 2005 compilation of the group's hits entitled, A String of Pearls.

== Chart history ==
The Ronettes

Chart (1969)	Peak position
Canada RPM Top Singles	73
U.S. Billboard Hot 100	108
U.S. Cash Box Top 100	92

The Pearls

Chart (1972)	Peak position
UK (The Official Charts Company)	32
