= Maggie Stredder =

- Born: Margaret Elizabeth Stredder; 9 January 1936
- Died: 9 March 2018 (aged 82)
- Genres: Pop; rock and roll; novelty
- Occupation: Singer
- Instrument: Vocals
- Formerly of: The Vernons Girls; The Ladybirds
- Spouse(s): Roy Tuvey (m. 1966; div. 1988) Jim Kennedy (m. 1999; died 2015)

Margaret Elizabeth "Maggie" Stredder (9 January 1936 – 9 March 2018) was a British singer, known as "the girl with the glasses" for her trademark horn-rimmed spectacles. She sang with the Vernons Girls and then the Ladybirds, with whom she appeared on television during the 1950s, 1960s and 1970s.

== Biography ==
Stredder first appeared on television with a female choir on the Six-Five Special in 1957. They then became the Vernons Girls on Oh Boy!, where they featured singing their own songs as well as supporting other artists. She left in 1960 and formed the Two-Tones with fellow ex-Vernons Girl Jean Ryder (they were also billed as the De Laine Sisters); the pair toured military bases, supported acts such as Max Bygraves, and appeared on Sunday Night at the London Palladium.

In 1962, she was a founding member of the Ladybirds, with whom she appeared on television during the 1960s and 1970s, and was part of the house singers for Top of the Pops. She appeared as a backing vocalist on as varied records as Jimi Hendrix's "Hey Joe" and Benny Hill's "Ernie (The Fastest Milkman in the West)". As part of The Ladybirds, she also provided vocal harmonies for three British entries in the Eurovision Song Contest; for Sandie Shaw in 1967, which placed first, Olivia Newton-John in 1974 and Lynsey de Paul & Mike Moran in 1977. The Vernons Girls reformed in 1988 to support with Cliff Richard for two shows at Wembley Stadium in 1989; these were recorded and formed his From a Distance: The Event live album. From then until Stredder left in 2001, the Vernons Girls undertook a number of concerts in support of rock and roll artists such as Marty Wilde and Joe Brown, and on the "nostalgia circuit".

On 1 October 1966, Stredder married Roy Tuvey (born 1931), a comedy scriptwriter. Together they had one daughter and one son, Paul. They divorced in 1988. Having provided entertainment at a number of holiday camps, she came to know Jim Kennedy, the Pontins' entertainments executive; they married in 1999. Her second husband predeceased her in 2015, and Stredder died three years later, on 9 March 2018, from vascular dementia.

== Selected works ==
- Stredder, Maggie; Richard, Cliff (2001). The Girl with the Glasses: The Showbusiness Autobiography of Maggie Stredder. Showbiz Publications. ISBN 978-0954058715.
