= The Carefrees =

British music group

The Carefrees were a British group formed in 1964, most known for their song "We Love You Beatles". Although often referred to as a girl group, the Carefrees can be considered a pop band, as the group consisted of Lynn Cornell, Barbara Kay and Betty Prescott (vocals), along with Don Ridell (piano, organ), Johnny Evans (sax, flutes) and John Stevens (drums).

Cornell had previously been in The Vernons Girls, and was married to Andy White, who played drums on one of the versions of the Beatles' "Love Me Do". As a solo artist, Cornell's 1960 recording of "Never on Sunday" reached No. 30 in the UK Singles Chart.

Prescott had also been a vocalist in The Vernons Girls, as well as having been a vocalist in The Breakaways.

"We Love You Beatles" was The Carefrees' first recording and only charted single, reaching #39 on the US Billboard Hot 100. After one further single and an album (consisting of the singles, plus numerous covers of current British Invasion hits), the group disbanded in 1964, the year they were formed.

Post-Carefrees, Prescott returned to The Breakaways, who featured as backing vocalists on scores of recordings by Petula Clark, Dusty Springfield, Cilla Black, Lulu and many others. Cornell joined The Pearls, who charted in the UK with several singles between 1972 and 1974, including their Top 10 hit, "Guilty".

== Discography ==
=== Albums ===
- 1964: We Love You All

=== Singles ===
- 1964: "We Love You Beatles"
- 1964: "The Paddy Whack"
