= Marsha Albert =

American Beatles fan

- Born: 1949 (age 76–77); Silver Spring, Maryland, US
- Known for: Introducing the Beatles to American radio

Marsha Albert (born 1949) is an American citizen who triggered the early 1960s phenomenon known as Beatlemania in the United States, when as a 14-year-old girl, on December 17, 1963, she introduced the Beatles song "I Want To Hold Your Hand" on American radio. Beatles historian and author, Bruce Spizer, said in 2004, “Marsha Albert's actions forced a major record company to push up the release date of a debut single from an unknown band during the holiday season, a time when record companies traditionally released no new product.”

== History ==
On the morning of November 22, 1963, CBS Morning News, hosted by Mike Wallace, aired a light trend segment about the Beatles and the phenomenon surrounding the band known as Beatlemania. It was due to air again later that evening on the CBS Evening News, hosted by Walter Cronkite, but was shelved following the assassination of John F. Kennedy that afternoon. It was eventually re-aired by Cronkite on December 10, 1963. After viewing this re-aired segment, Albert, a 15-year-old living in Silver Spring, Maryland, wrote to her local radio station, WWDC-AM, asking disc jockey Carroll James Jr., "Why can't we have music like that here in America?". After receiving Albert's letter, James Jr. "pulled strings and called in favors" and obtained a copy of "I Want To Hold Your Hand" from a British Overseas Airways Corporation flight attendant. On December 17, 1963, James Jr. invited Albert to his studio where she introduced the song to America for the first time.

== Marcia Schafer Raubach dispute ==
Marcia Schafer Raubach, who, in 1963, was a high school senior in West Frankfort, Illinois, claimed that she was the first to play a record by the Beatles in America on her father's radio station in September, but that was disputed by Chicago radio station WLS AM—though Raubach is credited with being the first American to interview, on American radio, a Beatle member, George Harrison, who at the time (September 1963) was in the southern Illinois region to visit his sister.
