= Girl group =

Pop music act featuring young women

A girl group is a music act featuring three or more female singers who generally harmonize together. The term "girl group" is also used in a narrower sense in the United States to denote the wave of American female pop music singing groups that flourished in the late 1950s and early 1960s between the decline of early rock and roll and start of the British Invasion, many of whom were influenced by doo-wop. All-female bands, in which members also play instruments, are usually considered a separate phenomenon. These groups are sometimes called "girl bands" to differentiate, although this terminology is not universally followed.

With the advent of the music industry and radio broadcasting, a number of girl groups emerged, such as the Andrews Sisters. The late 1950s saw the emergence of all-female singing groups as a major force, with 750 distinct girl groups releasing songs that reached US and UK music charts from 1960 to 1966. The Supremes alone held 12 number-one singles on the Billboard Hot 100 during the height of the wave and throughout most of the British Invasion rivaled the Beatles in popularity.

In later eras, the girl group template would be applied to disco, contemporary R&B, and country-based formats, as well as pop. A more globalized music industry gave rise to the popularity of dance-oriented pop music led by major record labels. This emergence, led by the US, UK, South Korea and Japan, produced popular acts, with eight groups debuting after 1990 having sold more than 15 million physical copies of their albums. The Spice Girls, who are the biggest selling girl-group of all time, succeeded in the 1990s by changing the target market for girl groups from a male audience to an increasingly young and female one. In the 2010s, the K-pop phenomenon led to the rise of successful girl groups including Girls' Generation, Twice and Blackpink.

== History ==
=== Vaudeville and close harmonies ===
One of the first major all-female groups was the Hamilton Sisters and Fordyce, an American trio who successfully toured England and parts of Europe in 1927, recorded and appeared on BBC radio – they toured the US variety and big-time theaters extensively, and later changed their stage name to the Three X Sisters. The band was together from 1923 until the early 1940s, and known for their close harmonies, as well as barbershop style or novelty tunes, and utilized their 1930s radio success. The Three X Sisters were also especially a notable addition to the music scene, and predicted later girl group success by maintaining their popularity throughout the Great Depression. The Boswell Sisters, who became one of the most popular singing groups from 1930 to 1936, had over twenty hits. The Andrews Sisters started in 1937 as a Boswell tribute band and continued recording and performing through the 1940s into the late-1960s, achieving more record sales, more Billboard hits, more million-sellers, and more movie appearances than any other girl group to date. The Andrews Sisters had musical hits across multiple genres, which contributed to the prevalence and popularity of the girl group form.

=== 1955–1970: The golden age of girl groups ===
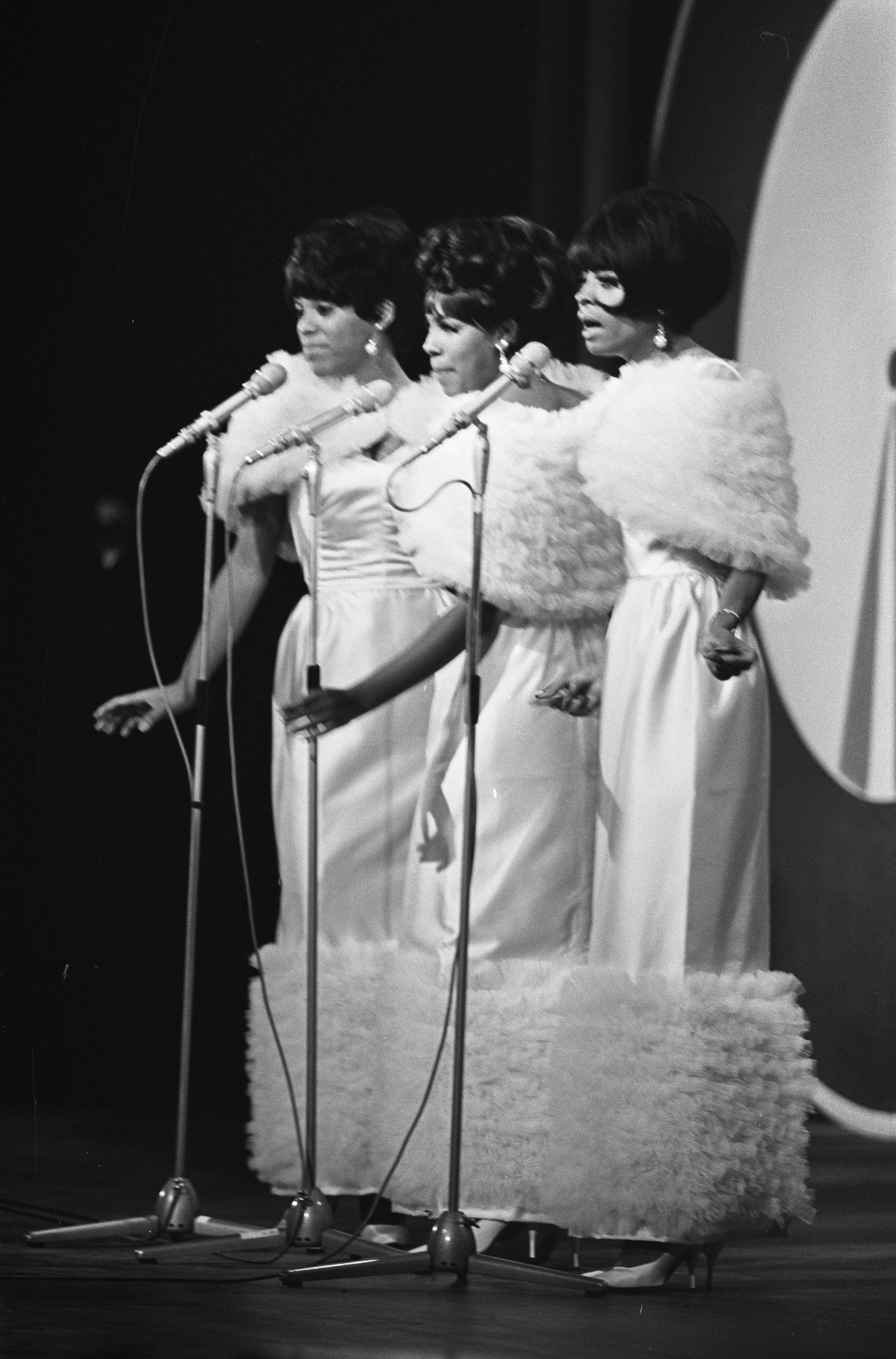
The Supremes are named the most-successful girl group of all time on the Billboard charts.

As the rock era began, close harmony acts like the Chordettes, the Fontane Sisters, the McGuire Sisters and the DeCastro Sisters remained popular, with the first three acts topping the pop charts and the last reaching number two, at the end of 1954 to the beginning of 1955. Also, the Lennon Sisters were a mainstay on The Lawrence Welk Show from 1955 on. In early 1956, doo-wop one-hit wonder acts like the Bonnie Sisters with "Cry Baby" and the Teen Queens with "Eddie My Love" showed early promise for a departure from traditional pop harmonies. With "Mr. Lee", the Bobbettes lasted for 5 1/2 months on the charts in 1957, building momentum and gaining further acceptance of all-female, all-black vocal groups.

However, it was the Chantels' 1958 song "Maybe" that became "arguably, the first true glimmering of the girl group sound". The "mixture of black doo-wop, rock and roll, and white pop" was appealing to a teenage audience and grew from scandals involving payola and the perceived social effects of rock music. However, early groups such as the Chantels started developing their groups' musical capacities traditionally, through mediums like Latin and choir music. The success of the Chantels and others was followed by an enormous rise in girl groups with varying skills and experience, with the music industry's typical racially segregated genre labels of R&B and pop slowly breaking apart. This rise also allowed a semblance of class mobility to groups of people who often could not otherwise gain such success, and "forming vocal groups together and cutting records gave them access to other opportunities toward professional advancement and personal growth, expanding the idea of girlhood as an identity across race and class lines." The group often considered to have achieved the first sustained success in girl group genre is the Shirelles, who first reached the Top 40 with "Tonight's the Night", and in 1961, became the first girl group to reach number one on the Hot 100 with "Will You Love Me Tomorrow", written by songwriters Gerry Goffin and Carole King at 1650 Broadway. The Shirelles solidified their success with five more top 10 hits, most particularly 1962's number one hit "Soldier Boy", over the next two and a half years. "Please Mr. Postman" by the Marvelettes became a major indication of the racial integration of popular music, as it was the first number one song in the US for African-American owned label Motown Records. Motown would mastermind several major girl groups, including Martha and the Vandellas, the Velvelettes, and the Supremes.

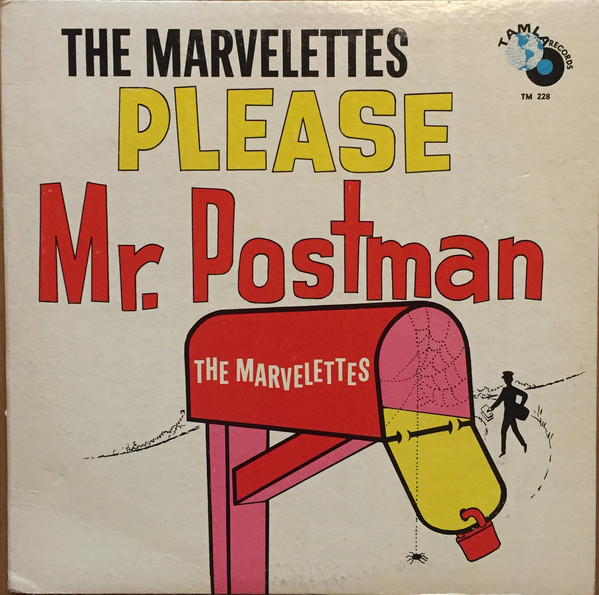
Please Mr. Postman LP cover

Other songwriters and producers in the US and UK quickly recognized the potential of this new approach and recruited existing acts (or, in some cases, created new ones) to record their songs in a girl group style. Phil Spector recruited the Crystals, the Blossoms, and the Ronettes, while Goffin and King penned two hit songs for the Cookies. Phil Spector made a huge impact on the ubiquity of the girl group, as well as bringing fame and notoriety to new heights for many girl groups. Phil Spector's so-called Wall of Sound, which used layers of instruments to create a more potent sound allowed girl groups to sing powerfully and in different styles than earlier generations. Jerry Leiber and Mike Stoller would likewise foster the Exciters, the Dixie Cups, and the Shangri-Las. The Shangri-Las' hit single, "Leader of the Pack", exemplified the "'death disc' genre" adopted by some girl groups. These songs usually told the story of teenage love cut short by the death of one of the young lovers.

The Paris Sisters had success from 1961 to 1964, especially with "I Love How You Love Me". The Chiffons, the Angels, and the Orlons were also prominent in the early 1960s. In early fall 1963 one-hit wonder the Jaynetts' "Sally Go 'Round the Roses" achieved a mysterious sound quite unlike that of any other girl group. In 1964, the one-hit wonder group the Murmaids took David Gates' "Popsicles and Icicles" to the top 3 in January, the Carefrees' "We Love You Beatles" scraped the top 40 in April, and the Jewels' "Opportunity" was a small hit in December.

Over 750 girl groups were able to chart a song between 1960 and 1966 in the US and UK, although the genre's reach was not as strongly felt in the music industries of other regions. As the youth culture of western Continental Europe was deeply immersed in Yé-yé, recording artists of East Asia mostly varied from traditional singers, government-sponsored chorus, or multi-cultural soloists and bands, while bossa nova was trendy in Latin America. Beat music's global influence eventually pushed out girl groups as a genre and, except for a small number of the foregoing groups and possibly the Toys and the Sweet Inspirations, the only girl groups with any significant chart presence from the beginning of the British Invasion through 1970 were Motown girl groups with the Supremes being the only girl group to score number one hits.

=== 1966–1989: Changes in formats and genres ===
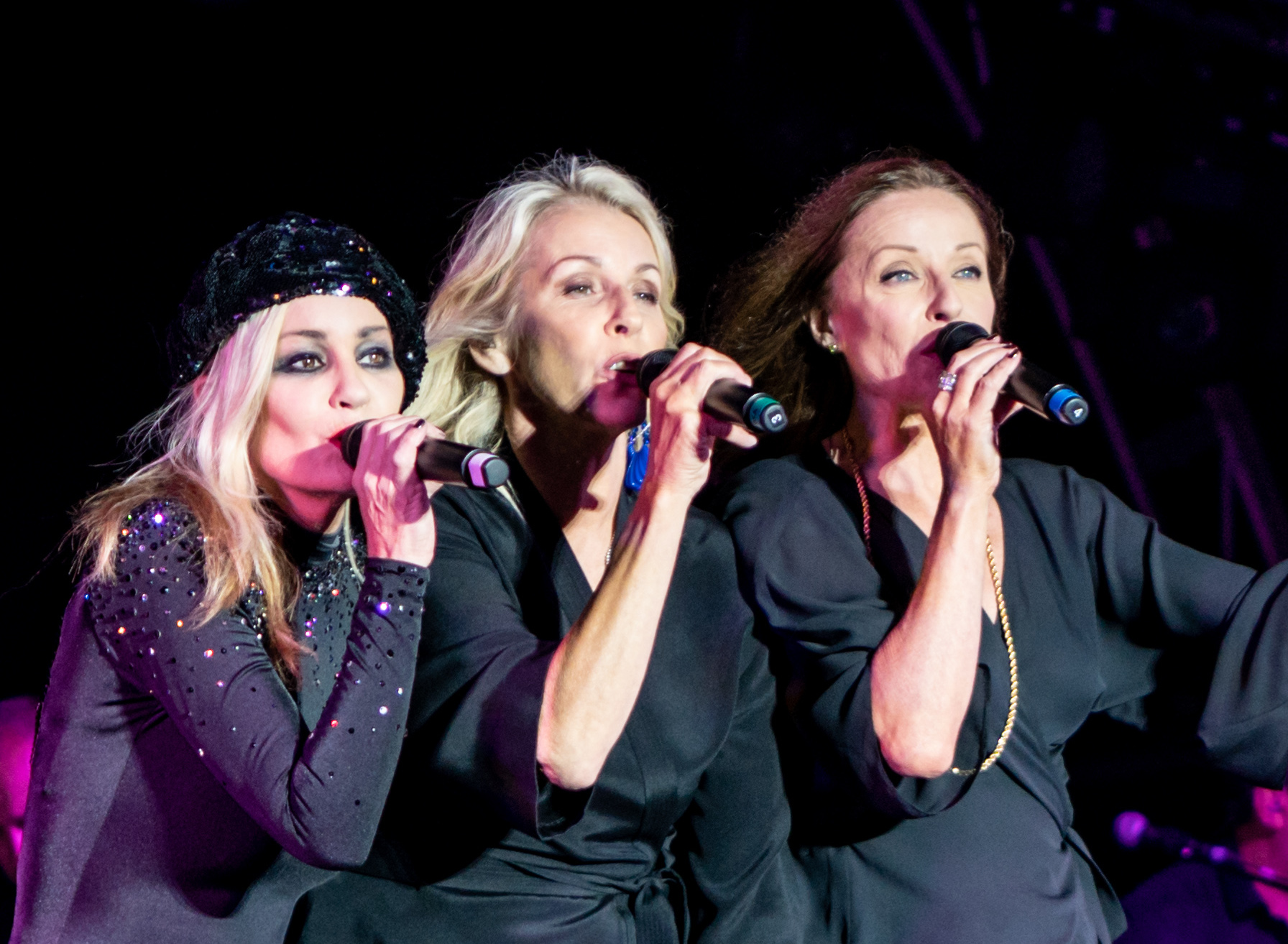
Bananarama were listed in the Guinness World Records for achieving the world's highest number of chart entries by an all-female group.

Entering the 1970s, the Supremes had continued success with top 10 hits "Up the Ladder to the Roof" and "Stoned Love" along with six other singles charting on Billboard's top 40. Only two other girl groups made top 10 chartings through 1974 with "Want Ads" by Honey Cone and "When Will I See You Again" by the Three Degrees (which had roots in the 1960s and in 1970, like the Chantels in 1958, began their top 40 pop career with "Maybe"). Patti LaBelle and the Bluebelles was a US 1960s girl group whose image Vicki Wickham, their manager, helped remake in the early 1970s, renaming the group Labelle and pushing them in the direction of glam rock. Labelle were the first girl group to eschew matching outfits and identical choreography, instead wearing extravagant spacesuits and feathered headdresses. During the disco craze and beyond, female acts included First Choice, Silver Convention, Hot, the Emotions, High Inergy, Odyssey, Sister Sledge, Mary Jane Girls, Belle Epoque, Frantique, Luv', and Baccara. Groups of the 1980s like the Pointer Sisters, Exposé, and Bananarama updated the concept.

In Latin America, there were a number of dance-oriented popular girl groups during the era, including the Flans, Pandora and Fandango.

In Japan, all-female idol groups Candies and Pink Lady made a series of hits during the 1970s and 1980s as well. The Japanese music program Music Station listed Candies and Pink Lady in their Top 50 Idols of All Time (compiled in 2011), placing them at number 32 and number 15, with sales exceeding 5 and 13 million in Japan, respectively. With the single "Kiss in the Dark", Pink Lady was also one of only two Japanese artists to have reached the Billboard Top 40.

=== 1990–2019: Dance pop girl group era ===
==== North America ====
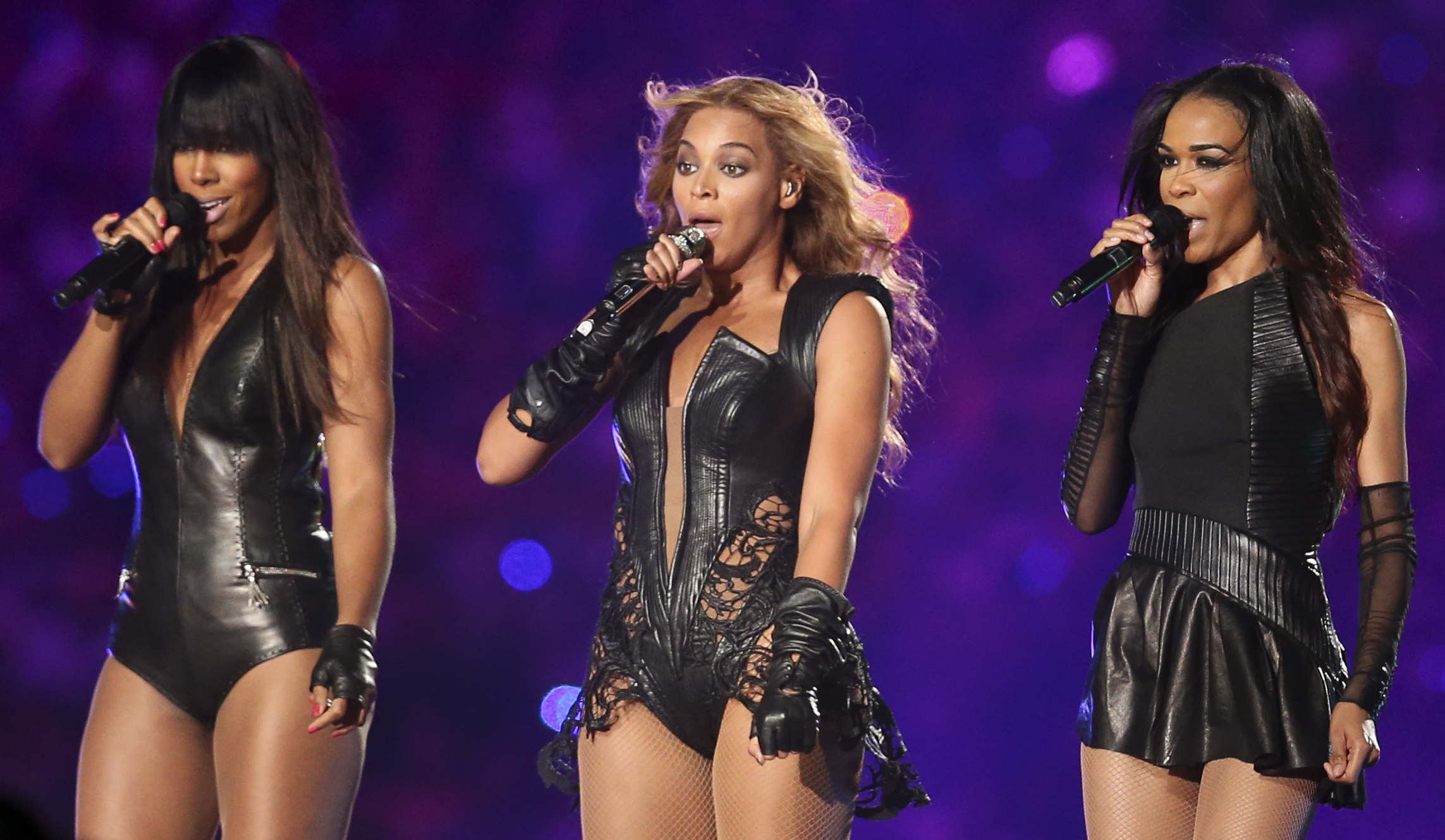
Destiny's Child are the most commercially successful American girl group of the 2000s.

With their 1990 eponymous debut album, the trio Wilson Phillips sold over 5 million copies worldwide and reached five major US hit singles, four of which cracked the Top 10, with three peaking at number one on the Billboard Hot 100. After the rise of new jack swing, contemporary R&B and hip hop, American girl groups such as En Vogue, Exposé and Sweet Sensation all had singles which hit number one on the charts. Groups in these genres, such as SWV, Xscape, 702, Total, Zhane, Blaque, and 3LW, managed to have songs chart on both the U.S. Hot 100 and the U.S. R&B charts. However, TLC achieved the most success for a girl group in an era where contemporary R&B would become global mainstream acceptance. TLC remains the best-selling American girl group with 65 million records sold, and their second studio album, CrazySexyCool (1994), remains the best-selling album by a girl group in the United States (Diamond certification), while selling over 14 million copies worldwide. Destiny's Child emerged in the late 1990s and sold more than 60 million records.

In the mid-to-late-2000s, there was a revival of girl groups. American girl group and dance ensemble the Pussycat Dolls achieved worldwide success with their singles. Danity Kane also became the first girl group in Billboard history to have two consecutive number-one albums, as their self-titled debut album (2006) and their second album Welcome to the Dollhouse (2008) both topped the U.S. Billboard 200.

Girl groups continued their success in the 2010s. Girl group Fifth Harmony formed in 2012 on The X Factor USA. They reached international success with their debut album Reflection, which featured the hit "Worth It". "Work from Home", the lead single from their second studio album, became the first top-five single in the U.S. by a girl group in a decade, following the September 2006 peak of "Buttons" by The Pussycat Dolls at number three. "Worth It" and "Work from Home" remain the most-viewed girl group music videos on YouTube.

==== United Kingdom and Europe ====
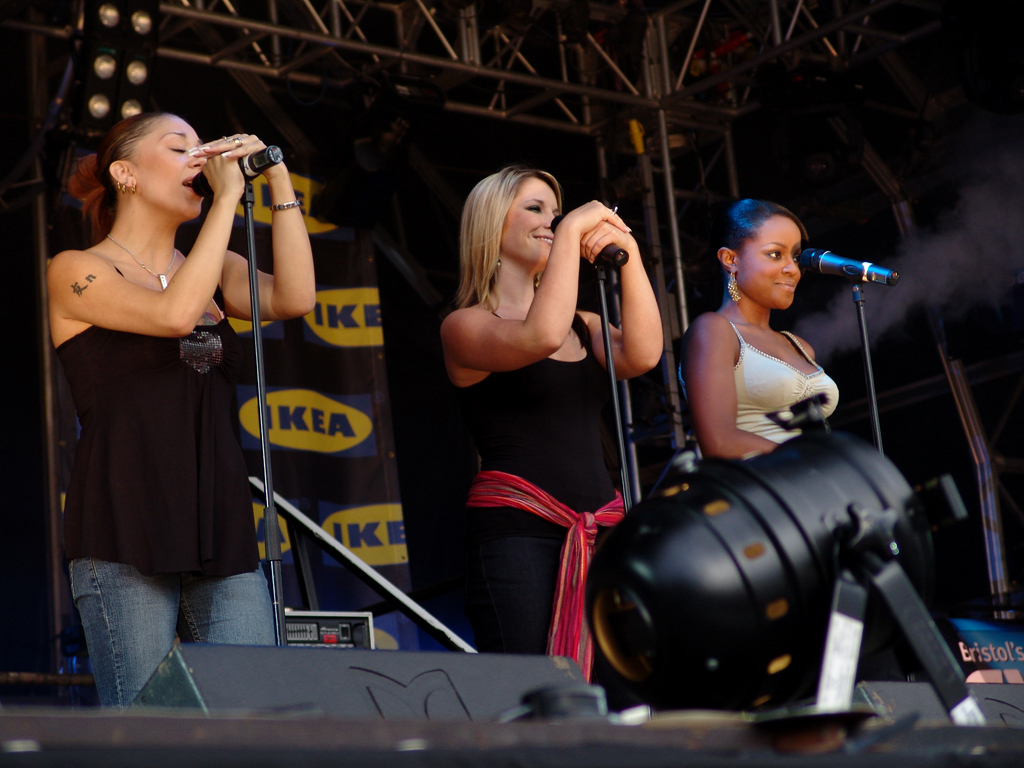
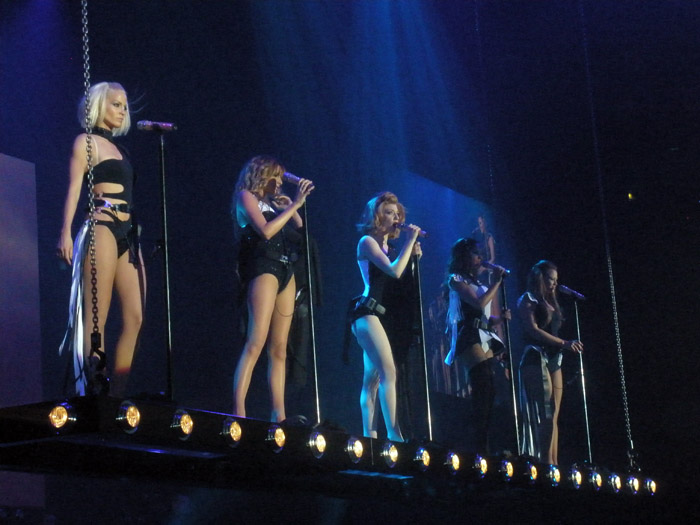
In the 2000s, the Sugababes and Girls Aloud (from top to bottom) achieved multiple number one songs on the UK Singles Chart.

In the early 1990s, the British music scene was dominated by boy bands. The only girl group making an impact on the UK charts at the time was Eternal, but even they "remained largely faceless". Amidst the American domination of the girl group format, the Second British Invasion saw the UK's Spice Girls turn the tide in the mid-1990s, achieving ten number 1 singles in the UK and US. With sold-out concerts, advertisements, merchandise, 86 million worldwide record sales, the best-selling album of all time by a female group, and a film, the Spice Girls became the most commercially successful British group since the Beatles. Unlike their predecessors who were marketed at male record buyers, the Spice Girls redefined the girl group concept by going after a young female fanbase instead.

The cultural movement started by the Spice Girls produced a glut of other similar acts, which include the British-Canadian outfit All Saints, Irish girl group B*Witched, Atomic Kitten and the Honeyz, who all achieved varying levels of success during the decade. Throughout the 2000s, girl groups from the UK remained popular, with Girls Aloud's "Sound of the Underground" and Sugababes' "Round Round" having been called "two huge groundbreaking hits" credited with reshaping British pop music for the 2000s. Despite her being a solo artist, Amy Winehouse's 2006 album Back to Black contained heavy influence from 1960s girl groups and garnered Winehouse comparisons to the Ronettes. UK girl groups continued to have success in the 2000s and early 2010s, with acts such as Mis-Teeq, the Saturdays, Stooshe, Neon Jungle, Four of Diamonds and Little Mix, one of the most successful acts to come from the British version of The X Factor. Little Mix went on to become the major girl group of the 2010s, noted as the one British group that survived the "girl group apocalypse" that the late 2010s suffered.

==== East Asia and J-pop/K-pop ====
Although the emergence of dance-pop focused acts in Asia paralleled their British counterparts in the 1990s, girl groups in Asia sustained as a successful format through the 2010s. Japan has the music industry's second largest market overall and the largest physical music market in the world, with the physical sales Oricon Singles Chart being dominated by J-pop idol girl groups. In the late 1990s, vocal/dance girl bands Speed and Max gained prominence in Asia, and paved the way for succeeding Japanese girl groups, such as Morning Musume, AKB48, Perfume, and Momoiro Clover Z. Speed sold a total of 20 million copies in Japan within three years, with Variety calling them "Japan's top girl group", while Max still hold the record for girl group with the second most consecutive top 10 singles in Japan. Throughout the 2010s, AKB48 sister groups have been launched or will be launched in other Asian countries, including Indonesia, China, Thailand, Taiwan, the Philippines, and Vietnam. Several new Japanese idol groups appeared in the 2010s and created a fiercely competitive situation in the music industry, which has been referred to as the "Idol sengoku jidai" (アイドル戦国時代; lit. Age of the Idol Warring States).

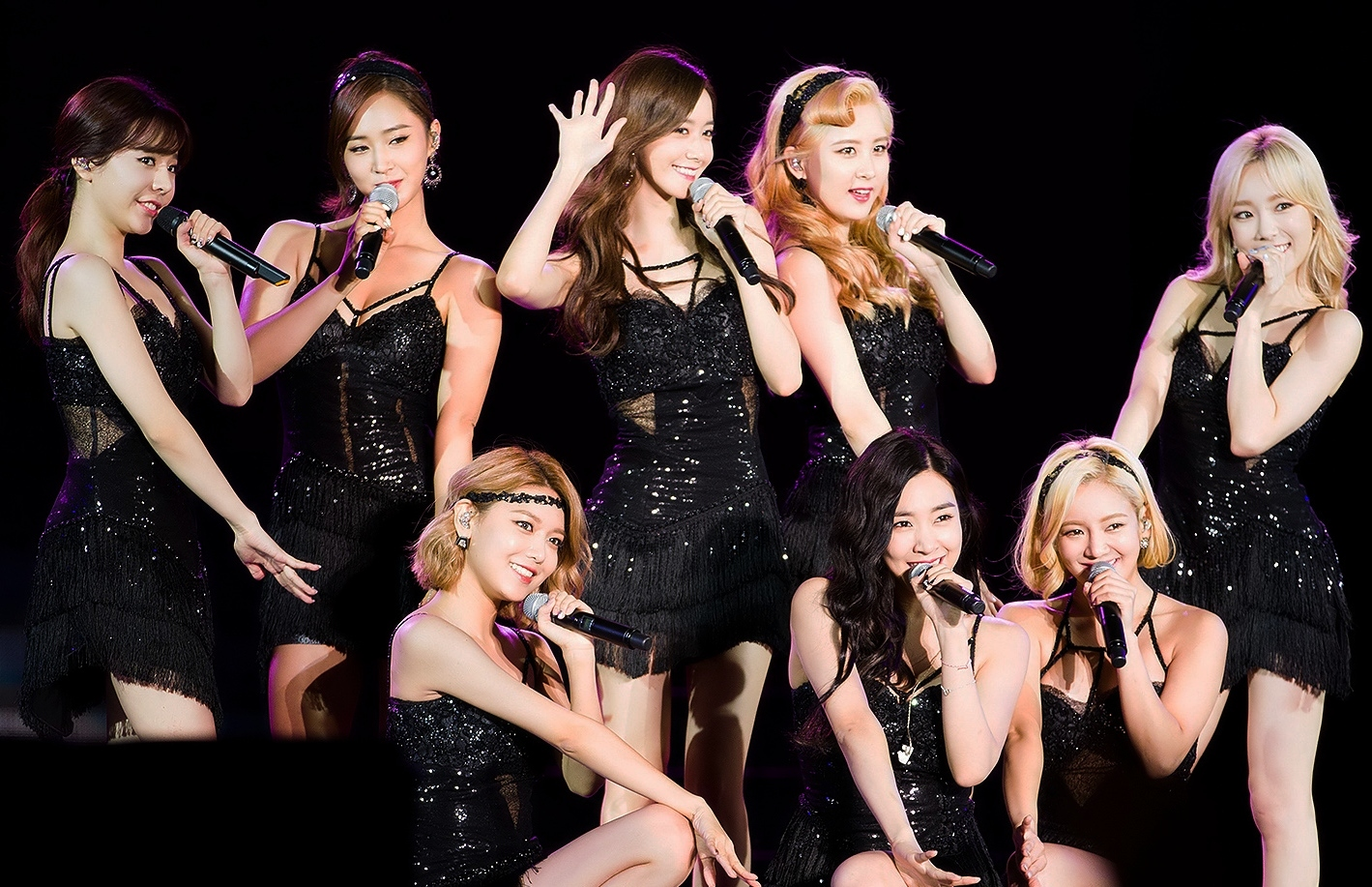
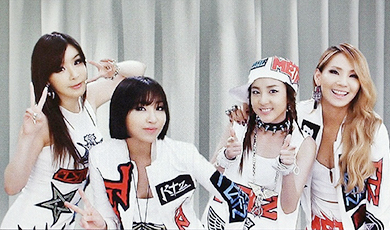
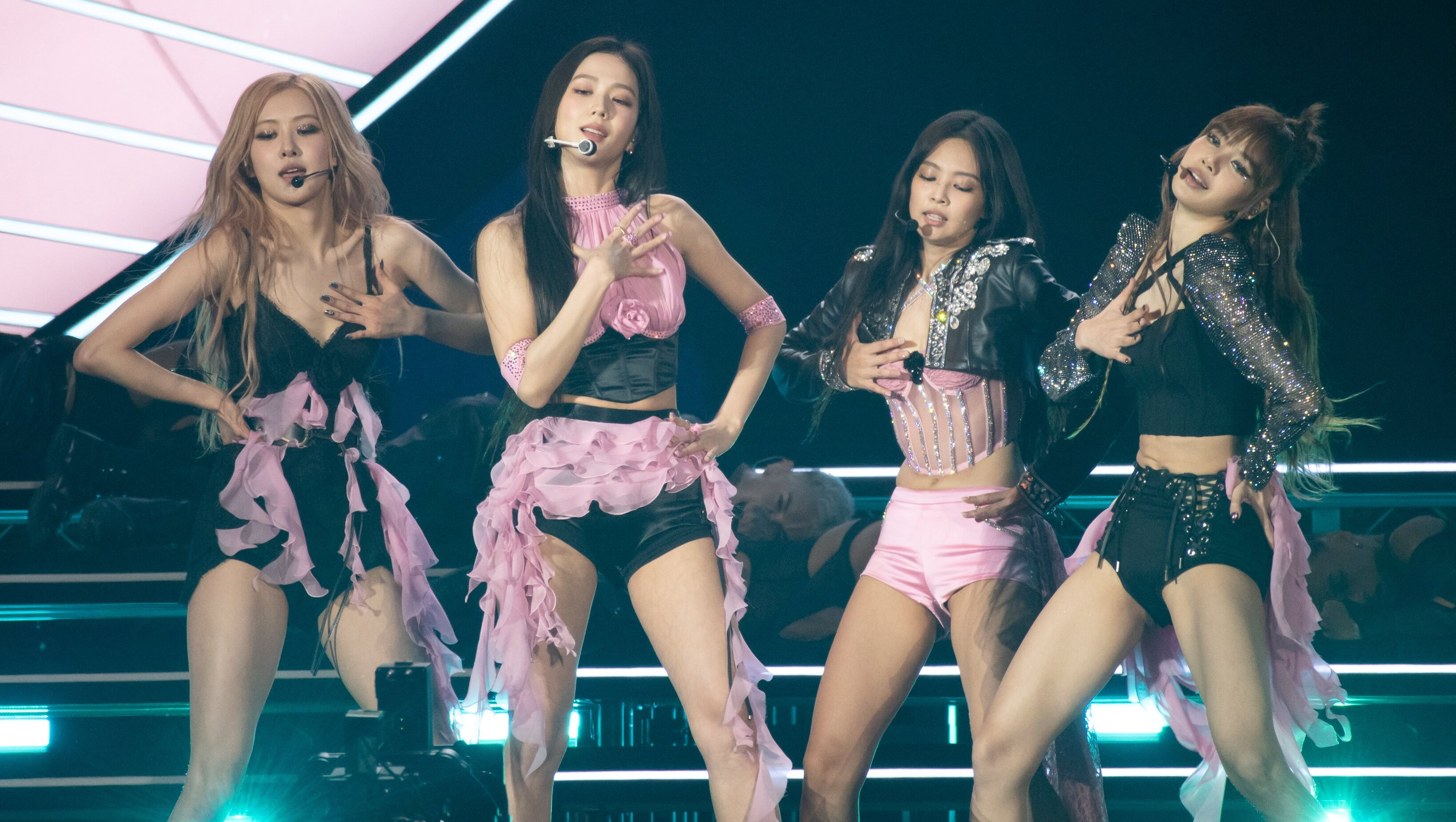
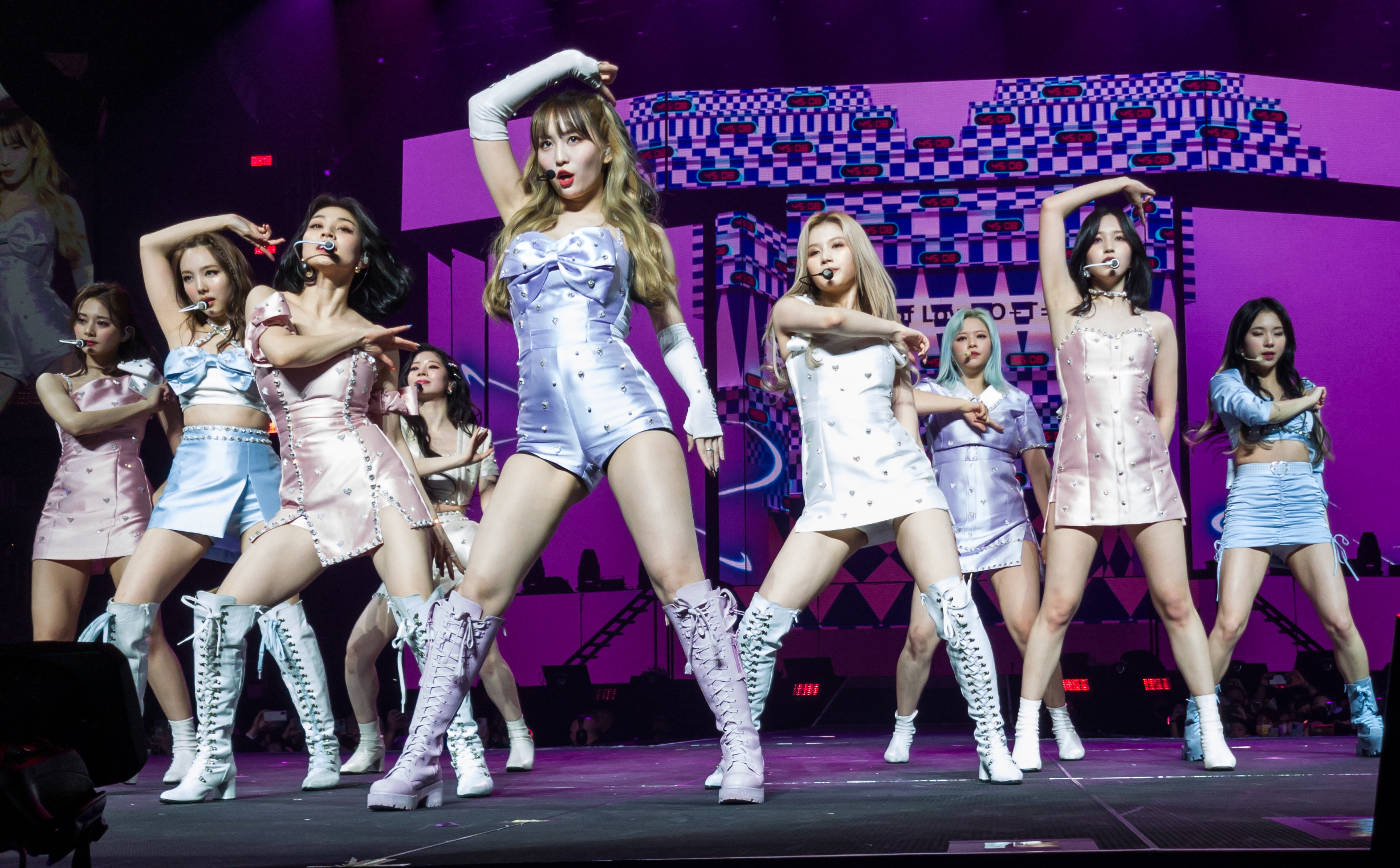
(clockwise) Girls' Generation, 2NE1, Twice and Blackpink are among the leading girl groups of the Korean wave.

From 2009, Hallyu (Korean wave) and K-pop became increasingly significant in the entertainment industry. Its influence spread to Japan and many other Asian, European and North American markets. At the beginning, girl groups such as Girls' Generation, 2NE1 and Wonder Girls were among the leaders of this "Hallyu" wave.

From the second half of the 2010s, new generations of Korean girl groups emerged and enjoyed great success as the Korean wave's globalisation accelerated. Popular South Korean girl groups of the era include Blackpink, Twice and Red Velvet, amongst others.

=== 2020–present: Current era ===
The early 2020s saw a lack of prominent girl groups in Western culture, with The Guardian writing that girl band culture was "in crisis" following the hiatus announcement of Little Mix in 2022. Following a period of the UK having no major girl groups, various girl groups began to emerge into the public domain in the early 2020s. These include: R&B trio Flo, American pop group Boys World, British trio Say Now, who were credited with "bringing back the chaotic energy of iconic UK girl groups", American supergroup Boygenius, British pop group XO, American Building the Band winners 3Quency, British-Venezuelan trio Deja Vu and British-Norwegian quartet Girl Group.

On the other hand, East Asian girl groups continued to dominate globally, with Blackpink, Twice and Red Velvet enjoying continued success. This led to the creation of numerous East Asian girl groups throughout the early 2020s, including Ive, NewJeans, Aespa and Le Sserafim. The popularity of the music style led to the creation of Katseye, a global girl group inspired by Korean girl groups. The decade also witnessed Southeast Asian girl groups such as Bini, 4Eve, and Dolla gaining success and widespread international recognition.

2025 also saw a phenomenon for fictional group Huntrix from the Netflix film KPop Demon Hunters; their song "Golden" became the first number one on the Billboard Hot 100 for a Korean girl group, as well as the first girl group to hit number one since Destiny's Child's "Bootylicious" in 2001.

== Themes ==
Girl groups have a wide array of subject matter in their songs, depending on time and place and who was producing. Songs also had a penchant for reflecting the political and cultural climate around them. For instance, songs with abusive undertones were somewhat common during the 1950s–1970s. One notable example was the song "He Hit Me (And It Felt Like a Kiss)" by the Crystals. During the "golden age of girl groups", lyrics were disparate, ranging from songs about mean dogs to underage pregnancy. However, common sentiments were also found in ideas like new love, pining after a crush or lover, and heartache. Some songs sounded upbeat or cheerful and sang about falling in love, whereas others took a decidedly more melancholic turn. Groups like the Shangri-Las, with the song "I Can Never Go Home Anymore" sang about the darker side of being in love.

=== Adolescence ===
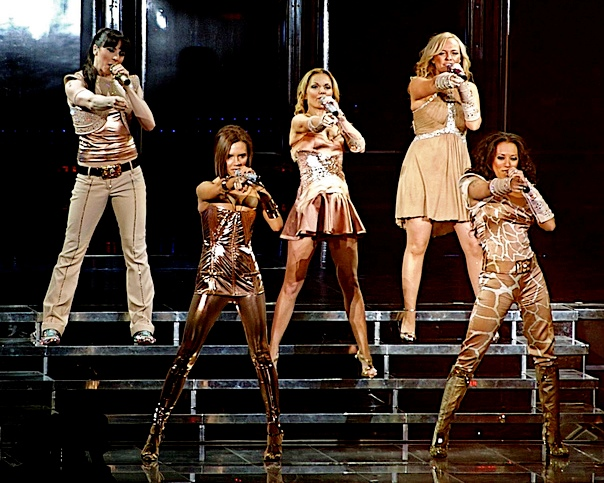
Breaking through during the mid-1990s, the Spice Girls became the best-selling girl group of all time.

An especially prevalent theme was adolescence. Since most of the girl groups were composed of young singers, often still in high school, songs mentioned parents in many cases. Adolescence was also a popular subject because of an emerging audience of young girls listening to and buying records. Adolescence was also reinforced by girl groups in cultivation of a youthful image, since "an unprecedented instance of teenage girls occupying center stage of mainstream commercial culture". An example of this youth branding might be Baby Spice from the Spice Girls. This was shown through flourishes like typically matching outfits for mid-century girl groups and youthful content in songs. Girl groups of the 1950s era would also give advice to other girls, or sing about the advice their mothers gave to them, which was a similarity to some male musical groups of the time (for example, the Miracles' "Shop Around").

Adolescence was also important (especially starting in the 1950s) from the other end: the consumers were "teenagers [with] disposable income, ready access to automobiles, and consolidated high schools that exposed them to large numbers of other teens. Mass teen culture was born."

=== Feminism ===
As the girl group structure persisted through further generations, popular cultural sentiments were incorporated into the music. The appearance of "girl power" and feminism was also added, even though beginning groups were very structured in their femininity. It would be simplistic to imply that girl groups only sang about being in love; on the contrary, many groups expressed complex sentiments in their songs. There were songs of support, songs that were gossipy, etc.; like any other musical movement, there was much variation in what was being sung. A prominent theme was often teaching "what it meant to be a woman". Girl groups would exhibit what womanhood looked like from the clothes they were wearing to the actual lyrics in their songs. Of course this changed over the years (what the Supremes were wearing was different from the Spice Girls), but girl groups still served as beacons and examples of certain types of identities to their audiences through the years.

In the 1990s through the present, with the prevalence of such groups as the Spice Girls, there has been a strong emphasis on women's independence and a sort of feminism. At the very least, the music is more assertive lyrically and relies less on innuendo. This more recent wave of girl groups is more sexually provocative as well, which makes sense within pop music within this time frame as well.

== See also ==
- List of girl groups
- List of best-selling girl groups
- List of highest-grossing concert tours by girl groups
- All-female band
- Women in music
