= Lover Please =

Single by Clyde McPhatter

from the album Lover Please!
- B-side: "Let's Forget About the Past"
- Released: February 1962
- Genre: Rock and roll
- Length: 1:52
- Label: Mercury
- Songwriter: Billy Swan
- Producer: Shelby Singleton

Clyde McPhatter singles chronology
"Your Second Choice" (1961)	"Lover Please" (1962)	"Little Bitty Pretty One" (1962)

"Lover Please" is a 1962 song written by Billy Swan and first recorded by the Rhythm Steppers in 1960. It is most known for the version performed by Clyde McPhatter on his 1962 album Lover Please! which set it up to reach No.7 on the U.S. pop chart. Overseas, it reached No.6 in Norway. The song ranked No.41 on Billboard magazine's Top 100 singles of 1962.

== Other charting versions ==
- The Vernons Girls, in 1962, which reached No.16 on the UK Singles Chart.
- Bobby G. Rice, in 1971, went to No.46 on the U.S. country chart.
- Kris Kristofferson and Rita Coolidge released a version in 1975. It sat at No.42 on the adult contemporary chart and was featured on their 1974 album Breakaway. Their recording won the Grammy Award for Best Country Performance by a Duo or Group with Vocal at the 18th Annual Grammy Awards in 1976.
- Cindy Church, in 1997, settled at No.44 on the Canadian country chart.

== Other versions ==
- Arthur Alexander - on his 1962 album You Better Move On.
- The Marvelettes - on their 1962 album The Marvelettes Sing.
- Swan included two different recordings on his 1974 album I Can Help and on the international release of his 1976 album Billy Swan respectively.
- Orion recorded it for his 1979 album Reborn.
- Jonathan Richman & The Modern Lovers - on their 1979 album Back in Your Life.
- Status Quo released their take as part of the 1990 single "The Anniversary Waltz (Part Two)".
- Kinky Friedman - on his 2007 live album Live from Austin TX.
- Colin Linden & Luther Dickinson, with The Tennessee Valentines, released a cover on their 2019 album Armour.
