= We Love You Beatles =

- 7" vinyl single cover

Single by The Carefrees

from the album We Love You All
- B-side: "Hot Blooded Lover"
- Released: 21 February 1964 (UK); March 1964 (US)
- Recorded: 1963
- Genre: Pop
- Length: 2:18
- Label: Oriole (UK); London International (US)
- Songwriters: Lee Adams, Charles Strouse

The Carefrees singles chronology
"We Love You Beatles" (1964)	"The Paddy Whack" (1964)

"We Love You Beatles" is a song by the Carefrees. It was a 1964 novelty record about The Beatles and the song peaked at number 39 on the Billboard Hot 100; it was the only Beatles novelty record to reach the Top 40. It was released in the UK on the Oriole label #CB1916 and in the USA on the London International label #10614.

The song was based on "We Love You Conrad" from the musical Bye Bye Birdie and has simple lyrics ("We love you Beatles, oh yes we do!"). Individual verses also have "We love you _____ (replace with "Ringo", "John", "Paul", and "George", in that order) along with reasons why the group loves that particular Beatle. It also includes at least three different vocal and instrumental quotations from the Beatles' 1963 hit song "She Loves You", suggesting that "We Love You Beatles" was a reply to it.
