= The Beatles: 1964 U.S. Albums in Mono =

Box set by the Beatles
- Released: 22 November 2024
- Recorded: 1962–1964
- Genre: Rock
- Labels: Capitol; Universal Music Group; Apple

The Beatles chronology
| Revolver: Special Edition (2022) | The Beatles: 1964 U.S. Albums in Mono (2024) | Beatles '64 (Music from the Disney+ Documentary) (2024) |

The 1964 U.S. Albums in Mono is a 2024 box set by the English rock band the Beatles. It was officially released on 22 November 2024 by Capitol Records, UMG International and Apple Records. It marked the second time the Beatles' U.S. albums were released in the U.K., with their first release in the U.K. being The U.S. Albums in 2014.

== Content ==
The 1964 U.S. Albums in Mono box set consists of the Beatles' 7 North American albums released in 1964, with the exception of The Early Beatles, which was released in 1965, the albums included are: Meet the Beatles!, The Beatles' Second Album, the American version of A Hard Day's Night, Something New, The Beatles' Story, Beatles '65 and The Early Beatles. The albums were made from the original mono master tapes for the box set rather than the 2009 mixes used in the 2014 The U.S. Albums set. All 7 albums had been out of print separately since 1995, with their last release being The U.S. Albums in 2014.

== Release ==
The box set was released to coincide with the documentary Beatles '64. All of the albums are also being sold separately, except for The Beatles' Story.

== Reception ==
Professional ratings
Aggregate scores
| Source | Rating |
|---|---|
| Metacritic | 89/100 |
Review scores
| Source | Rating |
| AllMusic | 4/5 stars |
| Mojo | 4/5 stars |
| Record Collector | 4/5 stars |
| Rolling Stone | 4.5/5 stars |
| Uncut | 9/10 |
| The Vinyl District | B |

In an AllMusic review, Tim Sendra states that it is a "lavish, well-considered and executed set that makes for quite the splurge for a Beatles fan with a nice phonograph set." In his review for The Second Disc, Marc Burrows called it "glorious, handsomely presented and lovingly put together" and "if there's one thing this box set, documenting seven albums released in a single year by a label wringing every drop of commercial potential from a cultural phenomenon, tells us… it's that some things never change." Goldmine Magazine critic John French concluded that it does "bring back the magic" while noting that "To me, this is a holding pattern at Universal while they wait for a Giles Martin remix of Rubber Soul. Purely conjecture on my part, but it is in the interest of the label and all those that hold dear the desire to continue to provide Beatles material to the marketplace, where no new music exists."

== Track listing ==
All tracks are written by Lennon–McCartney, except where noted.

=== Meet the Beatles! (1964) ===
Side one
| No. | Title | UK release | Length |
|---|---|---|---|
| 1. | "I Want to Hold Your Hand" | Non album single (1963) | 2:24 |
| 2. | "I Saw Her Standing There" | Please Please Me (1963) | 2:50 |
| 3. | "This Boy" | B side to "I Want to Hold Your Hand" (1963) | 2:11 |
| 4. | "It Won't Be Long" | With the Beatles (1963) | 2:11 |
| 5. | "All I've Got to Do" | With the Beatles | 2:05 |
| 6. | "All My Loving" | With the Beatles | 2:04 |

Side two
| No. | Title | Writer(s) | UK release | Length |
|---|---|---|---|---|
| 1. | "Don't Bother Me" | George Harrison | With the Beatles | 2:28 |
| 2. | "Little Child" | | With the Beatles | 1:46 |
| 3. | "Till There Was You" | Meredith Willson | With the Beatles | 2:12 |
| 4. | "Hold Me Tight" | | With the Beatles | 2:30 |
| 5. | "I Wanna Be Your Man" | | With the Beatles | 1:59 |
| 6. | "Not a Second Time" | | With the Beatles | 2:03 |

=== The Beatles' Second Album (1964) ===
Side one
| No. | Title | Writer(s) | UK release | Length |
|---|---|---|---|---|
| 1. | "Roll Over Beethoven" | Chuck Berry | With the Beatles | 2:42 |
| 2. | "Thank You Girl" | | B side to "From Me to You" (1963) | 2:00 |
| 3. | "You Really Got a Hold on Me" | Smokey Robinson | With the Beatles | 2:58 |
| 4. | "Devil in Her Heart" | Richard Drapkin | With the Beatles | 2:23 |
| 5. | "Money (That's What I Want)" | Janie Bradford, Berry Gordy, Jr. | With the Beatles | 2:46 |
| 6. | "You Can't Do That" | | A Hard Day's Night (1964) | 2:33 |

Side two
| No. | Title | Writer(s) | UK release | Length |
|---|---|---|---|---|
| 1. | "Long Tall Sally" | Enotris Johnson, Richard Penniman, Robert Blackwell | Long Tall Sally (EP) (1964) | 2:01 |
| 2. | "I Call Your Name" | | Long Tall Sally (EP) | 2:10 |
| 3. | "Please Mr. Postman" | Brian Holland, Robert Bateman, William Garrett, Georgia Dobbins, Fred Gorman | With the Beatles | 2:32 |
| 4. | "I'll Get You" | | B side to "She Loves You" (1963) | 2:02 |
| 5. | "She Loves You" | | Non album single (1963) | 2:18 |

=== A Hard Day's Night (1964) ===
Side one
| No. | Title | UK release | Length |
|---|---|---|---|
| 1. | "A Hard Day's Night" | A Hard Day's Night | 2:33 |
| 2. | "Tell Me Why" | A Hard Day's Night | 2:10 |
| 3. | "I'll Cry Instead" | A Hard Day's Night | 2:06 |
| 4. | "I Should Have Known Better" (George Martin Orchestra Instrumental) | By Popular Demand A Hard Day's Night (George Martin and his Orchestra album) (1964) | 2:10 |
| 5. | "I'm Happy Just to Dance with You" | A Hard Day's Night | 1:59 |
| 6. | "And I Love Her" (George Martin Orchestra Instrumental) | By Popular Demand A Hard Day's Night (George Martin and his Orchestra album) | 3:46 |

Side two
| No. | Title | UK release | Length |
|---|---|---|---|
| 1. | "I Should Have Known Better" | A Hard Day's Night | 2:44 |
| 2. | "If I Fell" | A Hard Day's Night | 2:22 |
| 3. | "And I Love Her" | A Hard Day's Night | 3:39 |
| 4. | "Ringo's Theme (This Boy)" (George Martin Orchestra Instrumental) | By Popular Demand A Hard Day's Night (George Martin and his Orchestra album) | 3:10 |
| 5. | "Can't Buy Me Love" | A Hard Day's Night | 2:12 |
| 6. | "A Hard Day's Night" (George Martin Orchestra Instrumental) | By Popular Demand A Hard Day's Night (George Martin and his Orchestra album) | 2:06 |

=== Something New (1964) ===
Side one
| No. | Title | Writer(s) | UK release | Length |
|---|---|---|---|---|
| 1. | "I'll Cry Instead" | | A Hard Day's Night | 2:09 |
| 2. | "Things We Said Today" | | A Hard Day's Night | 2:39 |
| 3. | "Any Time at All" | | A Hard Day's Night | 2:13 |
| 4. | "When I Get Home" | | A Hard Day's Night | 2:18 |
| 5. | "Slow Down" | Larry Williams | Long Tall Sally (EP) | 2:55 |
| 6. | "Matchbox" | Carl Perkins | Long Tall Sally (EP) | 1:58 |

Side two
| No. | Title | Writer(s) | UK release | Length |
|---|---|---|---|---|
| 1. | "Tell Me Why" | | A Hard Day's Night | 2:10 |
| 2. | "And I Love Her" | | A Hard Day's Night | 2:32 |
| 3. | "I'm Happy Just to Dance With You" | | A Hard Day's Night | 1:58 |
| 4. | "If I Fell" | | A Hard Day's Night | 2:22 |
| 5. | "Komm, Gib Mir Deine Hand" | Lennon–McCartney, Jean Nicolas, Heinz Hellmer | Rarities (1978) | 2:19 |

=== The Beatles' Story (1964) ===
Side one
| No. | Title | Length |
|---|---|---|
| 1. | "On Stage with the Beatles" | 1:03 |
| 2. | "How Beatlemania Began" | 1:20 |
| 3. | "Beatlemania in Action" | 1:25 |
| 4. | "Man Behind the Beatles – Brian Epstein" | 2:47 |
| 5. | "John Lennon" | 5:50 |
| 6. | "Who's a Millionaire?" | 0:39 |

Side two
| No. | Title | Length |
|---|---|---|
| 1. | "Beatles Will Be Beatles" | 7:28 |
| 2. | "Man Behind the Music – George Martin" | 1:04 |
| 3. | "George Harrison" | 4:46 |

Side three
| No. | Title | Length |
|---|---|---|
| 1. | "A Hard Day's Night – Their First Movie" | 3:08 |
| 2. | "Paul McCartney" | 2:45 |
| 3. | "Sneaky Haircuts and More About Paul" | 3:29 |

Side four
| No. | Title | Length |
|---|---|---|
| 1. | "The Beatles Look at Life" | 2:05 |
| 2. | "Victims of Beatlemania" | 1:10 |
| 3. | "Beatle Medley" | 3:58 |
| 4. | "Ringo Starr" | 6:24 |
| 5. | "Liverpool and All the World!" | 1:05 |

=== Beatles '65 (1964) ===
Side one
| No. | Title | Writer(s) | UK release | Length |
|---|---|---|---|---|
| 1. | "No Reply" | | Beatles for Sale (1964) | 2:15 |
| 2. | "I'm a Loser" | | Beatles for Sale | 2:31 |
| 3. | "Baby's in Black" | | Beatles for Sale | 2:02 |
| 4. | "Rock and Roll Music" | Chuck Berry | Beatles for Sale | 2:32 |
| 5. | "I'll Follow the Sun" | | Beatles for Sale | 1:46 |
| 6. | "Mr. Moonlight" | Roy Lee Johnson | Beatles for Sale | 2:35 |

Side two
| No. | Title | Writer(s) | UK release | Length |
|---|---|---|---|---|
| 1. | "Honey Don't" | Carl Perkins | Beatles for Sale | 2:56 |
| 2. | "I'll Be Back" | | A Hard Day's Night | 2:22 |
| 3. | "She's a Woman" | | B side to "I Feel Fine" (1964) | 2:57 |
| 4. | "I Feel Fine" | | Non album single (1964) | 2:20 |
| 5. | "Everybody's Trying to Be My Baby" | Carl Perkins | Beatles for Sale | 2:24 |

=== The Early Beatles (1965) ===
Side one
| No. | Title | Writer(s) | UK release | Length |
|---|---|---|---|---|
| 1. | "Love Me Do" | | Please Please Me | 2:23 |
| 2. | "Twist and Shout" | Phil Medley, Bert Russell | Please Please Me | 2:33 |
| 3. | "Anna (Go to Him)" | Arthur Alexander | Please Please Me | 3:00 |
| 4. | "Chains" | Gerry Goffin, Carole King | Please Please Me | 2:27 |
| 5. | "Boys" | Luther Dixon, Wes Farrell | Please Please Me | 2:25 |
| 6. | "Ask Me Why" | | Please Please Me | 2:28 |

Side two
| No. | Title | Writer(s) | UK release | Length |
|---|---|---|---|---|
| 1. | "Please Please Me" | | Please Please Me | 2:00 |
| 2. | "P.S. I Love You" | | Please Please Me | 2:05 |
| 3. | "Baby It's You" | Burt Bacharach, Mack David, and Barney Williams | Please Please Me | 2:38 |
| 4. | "A Taste of Honey" | Ric Marlow and Bobby Scott | Please Please Me | 2:04 |
| 5. | "Do You Want to Know a Secret" | | Please Please Me | 1:59 |

== Charts ==
Weekly chart performance for The 1964 U.S. Albums in Mono
| Chart (2024) | Peak position |
|---|---|
| Dutch Albums (Album Top 100) | 18 |
| Scottish Albums (Official Charts) | 41 |
| Swiss Albums (Schweizer Hitparade) | 80 |
| UK Official Albums Chart Update (OCC) | 91 |
