= Beatles '64 =

2024 documentary film

- Promotional release poster
- Directed by: David Tedeschi
- Produced by: Martin Scorsese; Margaret Bodde
- Starring: John Lennon; Paul McCartney; George Harrison; Ringo Starr
- Cinematography: Ellen Kuras
- Edited by: Mariah Rehmet
- Music by: The Beatles; Giles Martin (remixes)
- Production companies: Walt Disney Pictures; Apple Corps; Sikelia Productions
- Distributed by: Disney+
- Release dates: 29 November 2024 (UK, U.S.)
- Running time: 106 minutes
- Countries: United Kingdom; United States
- Language: English

Beatles '64 is a 2024 documentary film directed by David Tedeschi and produced by Martin Scorsese. It was released on Disney+ on 29 November 2024.

== Premise ==
The film documents the cultural impact of the Beatles on the United States in the aftermath of their first three-week visit to the country in February 1964, in which their historic first performances on The Ed Sullivan Show occurred. It includes archival footage from the Beatlemania era, and examines the personal dynamics of the group's members during the period.

== Production ==
The film was directed by David Tedeschi, who had first become involved with Apple Corps following his role as an editor on Martin Scorsese's documentary George Harrison: Living in the Material World, with the two directors becoming "very good friends with Olivia Harrison", the wife of the late George Harrison. It was produced by Scorsese, Olivia Harrison, Paul McCartney, Ringo Starr, Sean Ono Lennon, Margaret Bodde, Jonathan Clyde, and Mikaela Beardsley, with Jeff Jones and Rick Yorn serving as executive producers.

The film features footage shot by Albert and David Maysles originally for the 1964 documentary What's Happening! The Beatles in the U.S.A., digitally restored in 4K by Park Road Post. New interviews with McCartney and Starr were also filmed. Footage of the Beatles' February 1964 performances on The Ed Sullivan Show and at the Washington Coliseum in Washington, D.C. has also been restored, with audio from these performances remixed by Giles Martin using de-mixing technology developed by Peter Jackson's WingNut Films and previously used for Beatles releases on the 2022 reissue of Revolver and the 2023 reissue of 1962–1966.

== Cast ==
- The Beatles
  - John Lennon
  - Paul McCartney
  - George Harrison
  - Ringo Starr
- Joe Queenan
- Vickie Brenna-Costa (fan at the Plaza Hotel)
- Martin Scorsese
- Jamie Bernstein (fan and daughter of Leonard Bernstein)
- Jack Douglas
- Terence Trent D'Arby
- Jane Tompkins
- Smokey Robinson
- Harry Benson
- David Lynch
- Ronald Isley
- Ronnie Spector

== Soundtrack ==
Beatles '64 (Music from the Disney+ Documentary)

Soundtrack album / Compilation Album by the Beatles
- Released: 22 November 2024
- Genre: Rock
- Length: 50:23
- Label: UMG

The Beatles chronology
The Beatles: 1964 U.S. Albums in Mono (2024)	Beatles '64 (Music from the Disney+ Documentary) (2024)	Anthology 4 (2025)

A soundtrack album from the film was released digitally and on streaming platforms on 22 November 2024, a week prior to the documentary's release. The album contains studio recordings by the Beatles of songs featured in the film, as well as the original versions of tracks covered by the Beatles (e.g., the Chuck Berry recording of "Roll Over Beethoven", the Little Richard recording of "Long Tall Sally"). The compilation also includes a cover of "Yesterday" performed by Smokey Robinson and the Miracles on The Ed Sullivan Show in 1968.

=== Track listing ===
All tracks written by Lennon–McCartney and performed by the Beatles, except where noted.

Beatles '64 (Music from the Disney+ Documentary) track listing
No.	Title	Writer(s)	Performer(s)	Length
1.	"She Loves You" (non-album single, 1963^{[a]})			2:22
2.	"Please Please Me" (single released January 1963, included on Please Please Me in 1963^{[a]})			2:00
3.	"I Want to Hold Your Hand" (non-album single, 1963^{[a]})			2:26
4.	"I've Been Good to You"	William "Mickey" Stevenson; Smokey Robinson	The Miracles	2:41
5.	"You've Really Got a Hold on Me"	Robinson	The Miracles	2:52
6.	"You Really Got a Hold on Me" (from With the Beatles, 1963^{[a]})	Robinson		3:01
7.	"Yesterday" (live on The Ed Sullivan Show, March 31, 1968)		The Miracles (as Smokey Robinson & The Miracles)	3:18
8.	"Till There Was You" (from With the Beatles, 1963^{[b]})	Meredith Willson		2:13
9.	"I Saw Her Standing There" (from Please Please Me, 1963^{[a]})			2:53
10.	"Money (That's What I Want)"	Berry Gordy; Janie Bradford	Barrett Strong	2:37
11.	"Money (That's What I Want)" (from With the Beatles, 1963^{[b]})	Gordy; Bradford		2:49
12.	"From Me to You" (non-album single, 1963^{[a]})			1:57
13.	"Long Tall Sally"	Enotris Johnson; Richard Penniman; Robert "Bumps" Blackwell	Little Richard	2:07
14.	"Long Tall Sally" (from Long Tall Sally, 1964^{[b]})	Johnson; Penniman; Blackwell		2:02
15.	"Baby It's You" (from Please Please Me, 1963^{[b]})	Burt Bacharach; Barney Williams; Mack David		2:40
16.	"Twist and Shout" (from Please Please Me, 1963^{[a]})	Bert Russell; Phil Medley		2:34
17.	"It Won't Be Long" (from With the Beatles, 1963^{[b]})			2:13
18.	"This Boy" (non-album B-side, 1963^{[a]})			2:19
19.	"Roll Over Beethoven"	Chuck Berry	Berry	2:24
20.	"Roll Over Beethoven" (from With the Beatles, 1963^{[a]})	Berry		2:45
Total length:				50:23

==== Notes ====
- ^a uses the 2023 remixed edition from that year's reissue of 1962–1966
- ^b uses the 2009 remastered edition from The Beatles: Stereo Box Set

== Critical reception ==
On the review aggregator website Rotten Tomatoes, 95% of 58 critics' reviews are positive. The website's consensus reads: "Excavating priceless footage of the Fab Four at the peak of their popularity, Beatles '64 places audiences directly into an unforgettable flashpoint in cultural history". Metacritic, which uses a weighted average, assigned the film a score of 78 out of 100, based on 11 critics, indicating "generally favorable" reviews.

Peter Bradshaw wrote in The Guardian: "Contemporary interviews and amazing archive footage combine in a sublime snapshot of the band’s whirlwind first US visit".

=== Accolades ===
Award	Category	Nominee(s)	Result	Ref
Primetime Emmy Awards	Outstanding Sound Editing for a Nonfiction or Reality Program	Philip Stockton, Allan Zaleski, and John M. Davis	Nominated	
Primetime Emmy Awards	Outstanding Sound Mixing for a Nonfiction Program	Josh Berger and Giles Martin	Won	

== See also ==
- The Beatles: The First U.S. Visit - Another documentary film about The Beatles U.S visit
- The Beatles: Get Back
- Let It Be (1970 film)
