= All I've Got to Do =

- Cover of the Northern Songs sheet music (licensed to Sonora Musikförlag)

Song by the Beatles

from the album With the Beatles
- Released: 22 November 1963
- Recorded: 11 September 1963
- Studio: EMI, London
- Genre: Pop rock; soul
- Length: 2:04
- Label: Parlophone (UK); Capitol (US)
- Songwriter: Lennon–McCartney
- Producer: George Martin

"All I've Got to Do" is a song written by John Lennon (credited to Lennon–McCartney) and performed by the English rock band the Beatles on their second British album, With the Beatles (1963). In the United States, "All I've Got to Do" originally appeared on Meet the Beatles! (1964). According to Dennis Alstrand, the song is the first time in rock and roll or rock music in which the bass player plays chords as a vital part of the song.

== Inspiration ==
Lennon said he was "trying to do Smokey Robinson again," and Ian MacDonald compared it to "(You Can) Depend on Me" by the Miracles, both musically and lyrically. Richie Unterberger of AllMusic said it sounds like Robinson but also Arthur Alexander. Beatles biographer Bob Spitz said the song is "restlessly dark and moody", and compared it to the Shirelles' "Baby It's You" (a song the Beatles previously covered) and early Drifters recordings.

It was one of three songs Lennon was the principal writer for on With the Beatles, with "It Won't Be Long" and "Not a Second Time". Lennon said that it was written specifically for the American market, because the idea of calling a girl on the telephone was unthinkable to a British youth in the early 1960s. For instance, Lennon said in an interview regarding "No Reply": "I had the image of walking down the street and seeing her silhouetted in the window and not answering the 'phone, although I have never called a girl on the 'phone in my life! Because 'phones weren't part of the English child's life."

== Recording ==
The band recorded the song in a single recording session on 11 September 1963 in 14 takes with one overdub, take 15. The master take was take 15. It was mixed for mono on 30 September and for stereo on 29 October.

Although music journalist Steve Turner claims the song was written in 1961, MacDonald said the song was never in the Beatles' live repertoire, which explains why 8 of the 14 takes were incomplete: the band was unfamiliar with the song.

== Release ==
In the UK, "All I've Got to Do" was released on With the Beatles which also includes the Beatles' cover of "You Really Got a Hold on Me" by the Miracles, the most direct connection between the album and Robinson's music. In the US, Capitol Records pulled "You've Really Got a Hold on Me" off Meet the Beatles!, releasing it later on The Beatles' Second Album.

== Personnel ==
According to Ian MacDonald:

- John Lennon – lead vocal, rhythm guitar
- Paul McCartney – backing vocal, bass
- George Harrison – backing vocal, lead guitar
- Ringo Starr – drums

== Cover versions ==
- In 1979, Louise Goffin covered "All I've Got to Do" on her debut album, Kid Blue.
- In 2007, the Smithereens covered "All I've Got to Do"—and all the other songs on Meet The Beatles!—on their tribute album Meet the Smithereens!.
- Toxic Audio covered it on Come Together: An A Cappella Tribute to The Beatles.
