= Meet the Beatles! =

Studio album by the Beatles
- Released: 20 January 1964
- Recorded: 11 February – 23 October 1963
- Studios: EMI, London
- Genres: Rock and roll; pop; Merseybeat; R&B
- Length: 26:43
- Label: Capitol
- Producer: George Martin

The Beatles North American chronology
Introducing... The Beatles (1964)	Meet the Beatles! (1964)	Twist and Shout (1964)

The Beatles United States chronology
Introducing... The Beatles (1964)	Meet the Beatles! (1964)	The Beatles' Second Album (1964)

Singles from Meet the Beatles!
- 1. "I Want to Hold Your Hand" / "I Saw Her Standing There" Released: 26 December 1963

Meet the Beatles! is a studio album by the English rock band the Beatles, released as their second album in the United States. It was the group's first American album to be issued by Capitol Records, on 20 January 1964 in both mono and stereo formats. It topped the popular album chart on 15 February 1964 and remained at number one for eleven weeks before being replaced by The Beatles' Second Album. The cover featured Robert Freeman's iconic portrait of the Beatles used in the United Kingdom for With the Beatles, with a blue tint added to the original black-and-white photograph. Compared to With the Beatles, Meet the Beatles! dropped five tracks ("Roll Over Beethoven", "You Really Got a Hold on Me", "Devil in Her Heart", "Money (That's What I Want)" and "Please Mr. Postman") and added three others ("I Want to Hold Your Hand", "I Saw Her Standing There" and "This Boy").

== Background ==
After EMI's subsidiary Capitol Records repeatedly rejected requests by both Brian Epstein and George Martin to release Beatles records in the United States, EMI label head Sir Joseph Lockwood sent a deputy to Los Angeles in November 1963 ordering Capitol Records to commence promoting and releasing Beatles records in the United States. Despite the "first album" claim on the Meet the Beatles! cover, ten days prior to its release, Vee-Jay Records of Chicago beat Capitol to the punch with the release on 10 January 1964 of the Beatles' American debut album Introducing... The Beatles, which had been delayed for release for various reasons since the previous summer. Perhaps as a result of the Vee-Jay release, Liberty Music Shops advertised in the New York Times of 12 January 1964 that Meet the Beatles! was available for purchase, an ad not authorised by Capitol.

In 2004, Meet the Beatles was released for the first time on compact disc in both stereo and mono as part of The Capitol Albums, Volume 1 boxed set, containing the original US stereo and mono mixes. In 2014, Meet the Beatles! was again reissued on CD, individually and included in the Beatles boxed set The U.S. Albums. Although following the running order for Meet the Beatles!, the mixes featured in this reissue are the UK mono and stereo mixes.

== Music ==
By November 1963, the Beatles had already recorded over 35 songs for EMI's UK Parlophone label, while Capitol Records in the US planned to release an album and a single, and more at a later date. The US rights to the Beatles' first 14 tracks were held by Vee Jay Records along with a few others. "She Loves You" had been issued in America on the Swan label and also sold poorly. In Britain, Parlophone was already releasing its second Beatles album With the Beatles and had issued several singles which were not included on any UK albums with the exception of the first two ("Love Me Do"/"P.S. I Love You" and "Please Please Me"/"Ask Me Why"). While the Beatles' first two British albums each contained 14 tracks, in the American market albums were typically limited to 12 tracks and it was expected that albums would include the current hit single.

The first three tracks on the album include the December 1963 Capitol single "I Want to Hold Your Hand" along with the record's US B-side, "I Saw Her Standing There," and its UK B-side, "This Boy," from the original November 1963 release. Neither "I Want to Hold Your Hand" nor "This Boy" had appeared on an album at the time in the UK, while "I Saw Her Standing There" had been the lead-off track to the band's debut album. The other nine tracks on Meet the Beatles! were duplicated from its nearest UK counterpart album, With the Beatles. Those were original Beatles songs and not cover versions of songs by other artists with the exception of "Till There Was You". The remaining five tracks from With the Beatles were songs originally recorded by other artists. Capitol determined that for their first album they would only include original and fresh material. Capitol executives worried that the covers would turn Americans off the Beatles. The other five songs would appear on Capitol's next American LP, The Beatles' Second Album, released in April 1964. The songs "I Want to Hold Your Hand" and "This Boy" are in a duophonic [fake] stereo, because Capitol had not been provided proper stereo mixes.

== Critical reception ==
Professional ratings
Review scores
Source	Rating
AllMusic	4.5/5 stars
The Encyclopedia of Popular Music	3/5 stars
The Rolling Stone Record Guide	5/5 stars

In contrast to UK critics' reviews of its counterpart album, Meet the Beatles! garnered negative reception in the United States. William F. Buckley in the Boston Globe characterized the band's music as "god-awful", stating: “They are so unbelievably horrible, so appallingly unmusical, so dogmatically insensitive to the magic of the art that they qualify as crowned-heads of anti-music.” An article published by Newsweek on February 24, 1964 furthermore dismissed the Beatles: "Visually they are a nightmare…musically they are a near disaster…their lyrics are a catastrophe".

Retrospective reviews have since praised the album for its role on shaping rock-and-roll music. Robert Christgau included the album in his "Basic Record Library" of 1950s and 1960s recordings, published in Christgau's Record Guide: Rock Albums of the Seventies (1981). In 2001, the album was inducted into Grammy Hall of Fame. In 2003, the album was ranked at number 59 on Rolling Stone's 500 Greatest Albums of All Time list, re-ranked at number 53 on the 2012 list, and re-ranked at number 197 in 2020.

== Commercial performance ==
In the U.S., the album debuted at No. 92 on the album chart for the week ending 1 February 1964. Two weeks later, it peaked at #1 where it remained for eleven consecutive weeks, eventually to be replaced by The Beatles' Second Album. It sold 4,045,174 copies by 31 December 1964, and 4,699,348 copies by the end of the decade. It was certified Gold by the RIAA on 3 February 1964, and 5× Platinum on 26 December 1991.

== Track listing ==
All tracks written by John Lennon and Paul McCartney, except where noted.

Side one
No.	Title	Lead vocals	Length
1.	"I Want to Hold Your Hand"	Lennon and McCartney	2:24
2.	"I Saw Her Standing There"	McCartney	2:50
3.	"This Boy"	Lennon, McCartney, and Harrison	2:11
4.	"It Won't Be Long"	Lennon with McCartney	2:11
5.	"All I've Got to Do"	Lennon	2:05
6.	"All My Loving"	McCartney	2:04
Total length:			13:45

Side two
No.	Title	Lead vocals	Length
1.	"Don't Bother Me" (George Harrison)	Harrison	2:28
2.	"Little Child"	Lennon	1:46
3.	"Till There Was You" (Meredith Willson)	McCartney	2:12
4.	"Hold Me Tight"	McCartney	2:30
5.	"I Wanna Be Your Man"	Starr	1:59
6.	"Not a Second Time"	Lennon	2:03
Total length:			12:58

== Personnel ==
According to Ian MacDonald:

The Beatles

- John Lennon – lead and backing vocals, rhythm and acoustic guitars, handclaps; harmonica ("Little Child"); tambourine ("Don't Bother Me")
- Paul McCartney – lead and backing vocals, bass, handclaps; piano ("Little Child"); claves ("Don't Bother Me")
- George Harrison – backing vocals, lead and acoustic guitars, handclaps; lead vocals ("Don't Bother Me")
- Ringo Starr – drums, handclaps; bongos ("Till there Was You", "Don't Bother Me"); maracas ("I Wanna Be Your Man"); lead vocal ("I Wanna Be Your Man")

Additional musician and production

- George Martin – producer; Hammond organ ("I Wanna Be Your Man"); piano ("Not a Second Time")
- Norman Smith – engineer

== Charts and certifications ==
=== Chart performance ===
1964–1965 chart performance for Meet the Beatles!
Chart (1964–1965)	Peak position
US Billboard Top LPs	1
US Cash Box Top 100 Albums	1
US Music Vendor Top 100 LP's	1

2024–2025 chart performance for Meet the Beatles!
Chart (2024–2025)	Peak position
German Albums (Offizielle Top 100)	68
Greek Albums (IFPI)	44

=== Certifications ===
Region	Certification	Certified units/sales
Canada (Music Canada)	Platinum	100,000^{^}
United States (RIAA)	5× Platinum	5,000,000^{^}
^{^} Shipments figures based on certification alone.

== See also ==
- Outline of the Beatles
- The Beatles timeline
