= Sgt. Pepper's Lonely Hearts Club Band: 50th Anniversary Edition =

Compilation album by the Beatles
- Released: 26 May 2017
- Recorded: 24 November 1966 – 21 April 1967
- Studios: EMI and Regent Sound, London
- Length: 99:59
- Label: Apple
- Producers: George Martin (Original recordings); Giles Martin (Remix)

The Beatles chronology
Live at the Hollywood Bowl (2016)	Sgt. Pepper's Lonely Hearts Club Band: 50th Anniversary Edition (2017)	The Christmas Records (2017)

Sgt. Pepper's Lonely Hearts Club Band: 50th Anniversary Edition is an expanded reissue of the 1967 album Sgt. Pepper's Lonely Hearts Club Band by the English rock band the Beatles. It was released on 26 May 2017, the album's 50th anniversary. It includes a new stereo remix of the album by Giles Martin, the son of Beatles producer George Martin.

The release was accompanied by the Apple Corps documentary Sgt. Pepper's Musical Revolution, televised on the BBC, PBS and Arte. Promotion included billboards posted in major cities around the world. The reissue garnered critical acclaim and topped the UK Albums Chart.

== Background and content ==
The first CD contains a new stereo remix of Sgt. Pepper produced by Giles Martin, the son of Beatles producer George Martin. He said that he began working on the mix in December 2016 with engineer Sam Okell, who had similarly been involved in other Beatles legacy-related projects. Created using modern and vintage technology, the 2017 mix retains more of the idiosyncrasies that were unique to the original mono version of Sgt. Pepper. Unlike the original album, first-generation tapes were used rather than their subsequent mixdowns, resulting in a clearer and more spacious sound.

Sgt. Pepper's Lonely Hearts Club Band: 50th Anniversary Edition is available as a two-disc set and as a six-disc box set. The first of these offers alternate takes of the album's songs and of the non-album single tracks "Strawberry Fields Forever" and "Penny Lane". The six-disc Super Deluxe Edition includes four CDs and adds further studio outtakes, monaural mixes, a documentary, and 5.1 surround sound mixes of the album in both DVD and Blu-ray form. Among these features is George Martin's 1992 TV documentary The Making of Sgt. Pepper. Also included in the Super Deluxe version is a book containing liner notes for the recordings, and essays discussing subjects such as psychedelic culture, 1960s politics, and the atmosphere in the Beatles following their decision to retire from live performance in late 1966 and focus on the recording studio.

== Preview and promotion ==
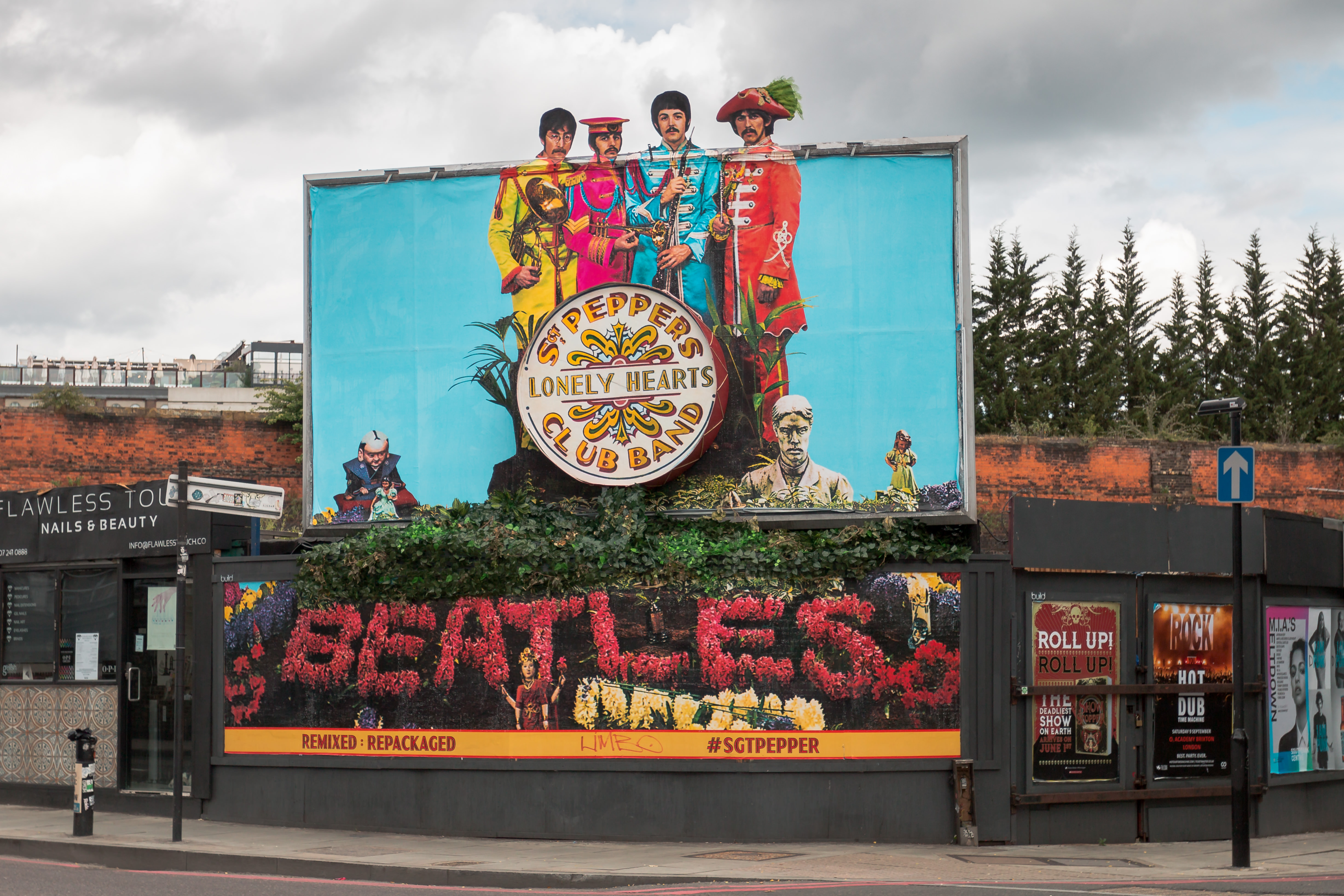
Sgt. Pepper 50th anniversary billboard in London

The Beatles' company Apple Corps and Universal Music hosted a preview of the new stereo mix on 10 April 2017. The event was held in Studio 2 at Abbey Road Studios (formerly EMI Studios), the room where the Beatles recorded most of Sgt. Pepper, and was attended by around 100 journalists.

Apple also produced a documentary to accompany the release, titled Sgt. Pepper's Musical Revolution. Written and presented by Howard Goodall, it was televised on the BBC, PBS and Arte to commemorate the anniversary. The occasion was also celebrated with posters, billboards and other decorations at notable locations around the world, including a billboard in New York's Times Square.

Coinciding with the album's 50th anniversary, Universal released all of the reissues formats on 26 May 2017. Geoff Edgers of The Washington Post interviewed Richard Goldstein, who, in his initial review of Sgt. Pepper for The New York Times, had been one of the few dissenters when the album received unprecedented critical acclaim in 1967. Edgers revealed that the left-hand speaker that Goldstein had originally heard the record through was broken. After listening to the album again, Goldstein acknowledged that the faulty speaker would have affected his listening experience 50 years before, but he stood by his general assessment of the album. The NME celebrated the 2017 reissue with a poll that asked its readers to name their favourite Beatle. George Harrison was voted in first place, ahead of John Lennon, Paul McCartney and Ringo Starr.

== Reception ==
Professional ratings
Aggregate scores
Source	Rating
Metacritic	100/100
Review scores
Source	Rating
Classic Rock	4/5 stars
The Daily Telegraph	5/5 stars
The Guardian	5/5 stars
The Independent	5/5 stars
Mojo	5/5 stars
Paste	10/10
Q	5/5 stars
Record Collector	4/5 stars
Rolling Stone	5/5 stars
Uncut	10/10

Sgt. Pepper's Lonely Hearts Club Band: 50th Anniversary Edition topped the UK Albums Chart, and albums charts in Scotland and Belgium. In the United States, it peaked at number 3 on the Billboard 200. On Metacritic, the reissue holds a score of 100 out of 100, based on thirteen professional reviews, indicating "universal acclaim".

Several critics praised Martin's new stereo mix. Neil McCormick of The Daily Telegraph commented: "It is like seeing a favourite movie again in high definition. It doesn't replace the original, it enhances it." Rolling Stone's Mikal Gilmore described the effect as a "long overdue epiphany", since "Popular music's most elaborate and intricate creation – and one that helped end the mono era – wasn't made to be heard in stereo." Danny Eccleston of Mojo also approved of Martin's work, especially the presence afforded Ringo Starr's drums. He added: "The voices feel 'properly' balanced and positioned. And in general, where there was whimsy (the bête noire of most Pepper agnostics) the power of solid drums and central voices irons it out."

In his review for Uncut, Michael Bonner said that "The Beatles never worked with such unified purpose again, but what this Pepper boxset captures is the fun, intense, playful ferment; the triumph, in other words." David Quantick, reviewing for Classic Rock, wrote: "Purists may balk at some of the perceived liberties Giles Martin has taken (splitting and panning drum parts or backing vocals for starters), but he's by no means claiming this is the definitive version of the album, and has clearly acted in the interests of the material."

== Track listings ==
All songs written by Lennon–McCartney, except "Within You Without You" by George Harrison. Track lengths per Kevin Howlett.

=== Super Deluxe Edition ===
Disc one – 2017 stereo remix of original album

Side one
No.	Title	Lead vocals	Length
1.	"Sgt. Pepper's Lonely Hearts Club Band"	McCartney	2:00
2.	"With a Little Help from My Friends"	Starr	2:42
3.	"Lucy in the Sky with Diamonds"	Lennon	3:28
4.	"Getting Better"	McCartney with Lennon	2:48
5.	"Fixing a Hole"	McCartney	2:36
6.	"She's Leaving Home"	McCartney with Lennon	3:25
7.	"Being for the Benefit of Mr. Kite!"	Lennon	2:37
Total length:			19:36

Side two
No.	Title	Lead vocals	Length
8.	"Within You Without You"	Harrison	5:05
9.	"When I'm Sixty-Four"	McCartney	2:37
10.	"Lovely Rita"	McCartney	2:42
11.	"Good Morning Good Morning"	Lennon	2:42
12.	"Sgt. Pepper's Lonely Hearts Club Band (Reprise)"	Lennon, McCartney, Harrison and Starr	1:18
13.	"A Day in the Life"	Lennon with McCartney	5:38
Total length:			20:02

Disc two – session highlights, sequenced in chronological order of their first recording dates, plus stereo mixes of "Strawberry Fields Forever" and "Penny Lane"

No.	Title	Length
1.	"Strawberry Fields Forever" (Take 1)	2:39
2.	"Strawberry Fields Forever" (Take 4)	3:00
3.	"Strawberry Fields Forever" (Take 7)	3:16
4.	"Strawberry Fields Forever" (Take 26)	3:18
5.	"Strawberry Fields Forever" (Stereo Mix – 2015)	4:09
6.	"When I'm Sixty-Four" (Take 2)	3:00
7.	"Penny Lane" (Take 6 – Instrumental)	2:56
8.	"Penny Lane" (Vocal Overdubs and Speech)	1:47
9.	"Penny Lane" (Stereo Mix – 2017)	3:00
10.	"A Day in the Life" (Take 1)	4:41
11.	"A Day in the Life" (Take 2)	4:49
12.	"A Day in the Life" (Orchestra Overdub)	0:55
13.	"A Day in the Life" (Hummed Last Chord) (Takes 8, 9, 10 and 11)	1:54
14.	"A Day in the Life" (The Last Chord)	2:53
15.	"Sgt. Pepper's Lonely Hearts Club Band" (Take 1 – Instrumental)	2:34
16.	"Sgt. Pepper's Lonely Hearts Club Band" (Take 9 and Speech)	2:36
17.	"Good Morning Good Morning" (Take 1 – Instrumental, Breakdown)	1:04
18.	"Good Morning Good Morning" (Take 8)	2:47
Total length:		51:18

Disc three – as above

No.	Title	Length
1.	"Fixing a Hole" (Take 1)	2:59
2.	"Fixing a Hole" (Speech and Take 3)	3:28
3.	"Being for the Benefit of Mr. Kite!" (Speech from Before Take 1 / Take 4 and Speech at the End)	3:08
4.	"Being for the Benefit of Mr. Kite!" (Take 7)	2:35
5.	"Lovely Rita" (Speech and Take 9)	3:05
6.	"Lucy in the Sky with Diamonds" (Take 1 and Speech at the End)	3:40
7.	"Lucy in the Sky with Diamonds" (Speech, False Start and Take 5)	4:08
8.	"Getting Better" (Take 1 – Instrumental and Speech at the End)	2:19
9.	"Getting Better" (Take 12)	2:45
10.	"Within You Without You" (Take 1 – Indian Instruments Only)	5:33
11.	"Within You Without You" (George Coaching the Musicians)	3:56
12.	"She's Leaving Home" (Take 1 – Instrumental)	3:49
13.	"She's Leaving Home" (Take 6 – Instrumental)	3:48
14.	"With a Little Help from My Friends" (Take 1 – False Start and Take 2 – Instrumental)	3:15
15.	"Sgt. Pepper's Lonely Hearts Club Band (Reprise)" (Speech and Take 8)	1:59
Total length:		50:27

Disc four – 1967 mono mix of original album, with six bonus tracks:

No.	Title	Length
14.	"Strawberry Fields Forever" (Original Mono Mix)	4:08
15.	"Penny Lane" (Original Mono Mix)	3:02
16.	"A Day In the Life" (Unreleased First Mono Mix)	4:43
17.	"Lucy in the Sky with Diamonds" (Unreleased Mono Mix – No. 11)	3:49
18.	"She's Leaving Home" (Unreleased First Mono Mix)	3:42
19.	"Penny Lane" (Capitol Records US Promo Single – Mono Mix)	3:01

== Personnel ==
- Giles Martin – mixing supervisor
- Sam Okell – mixing co-engineer
- Kevin Howlett – liner notes, research

== Charts ==
2017 weekly chart performance for Sgt. Pepper's Lonely Hearts Club Band: 50th Anniversary Edition
Chart (2017)	Peak position
Australian Albums (ARIA)	5
Austrian Albums (Ö3 Austria)	3
Belgian Albums (Ultratop Flanders)	2
Belgian Albums (Ultratop Wallonia)	1
Canadian Albums (Billboard)	7
Czech Albums (ČNS IFPI)	6
Danish Albums (Hitlisten)	3
Dutch Albums (Album Top 100)	2
Finnish Albums (Suomen virallinen lista)	23
German Albums (Offizielle Top 100)	5
Irish Albums (IRMA)	2
Italian Albums (FIMI)	6
Japanese Albums (Oricon)	5
Mexican Albums (AMPROFON)	18
New Zealand Albums (RMNZ)	4
Norwegian Albums (VG-lista)	9
Polish Albums (ZPAV)	28
Portuguese Albums Chart	3
Scottish Albums (Official Charts)	1
Spanish Albums (PROMUSICAE)	3
Swedish Albums (Sverigetopplistan)	2
Swiss Albums (Schweizer Hitparade)	2
UK Albums (Official Charts)	1
US Billboard 200	3

== See also ==
- Outline of the Beatles
- The Beatles timeline
