= Giles Martin =

English record producer and musician

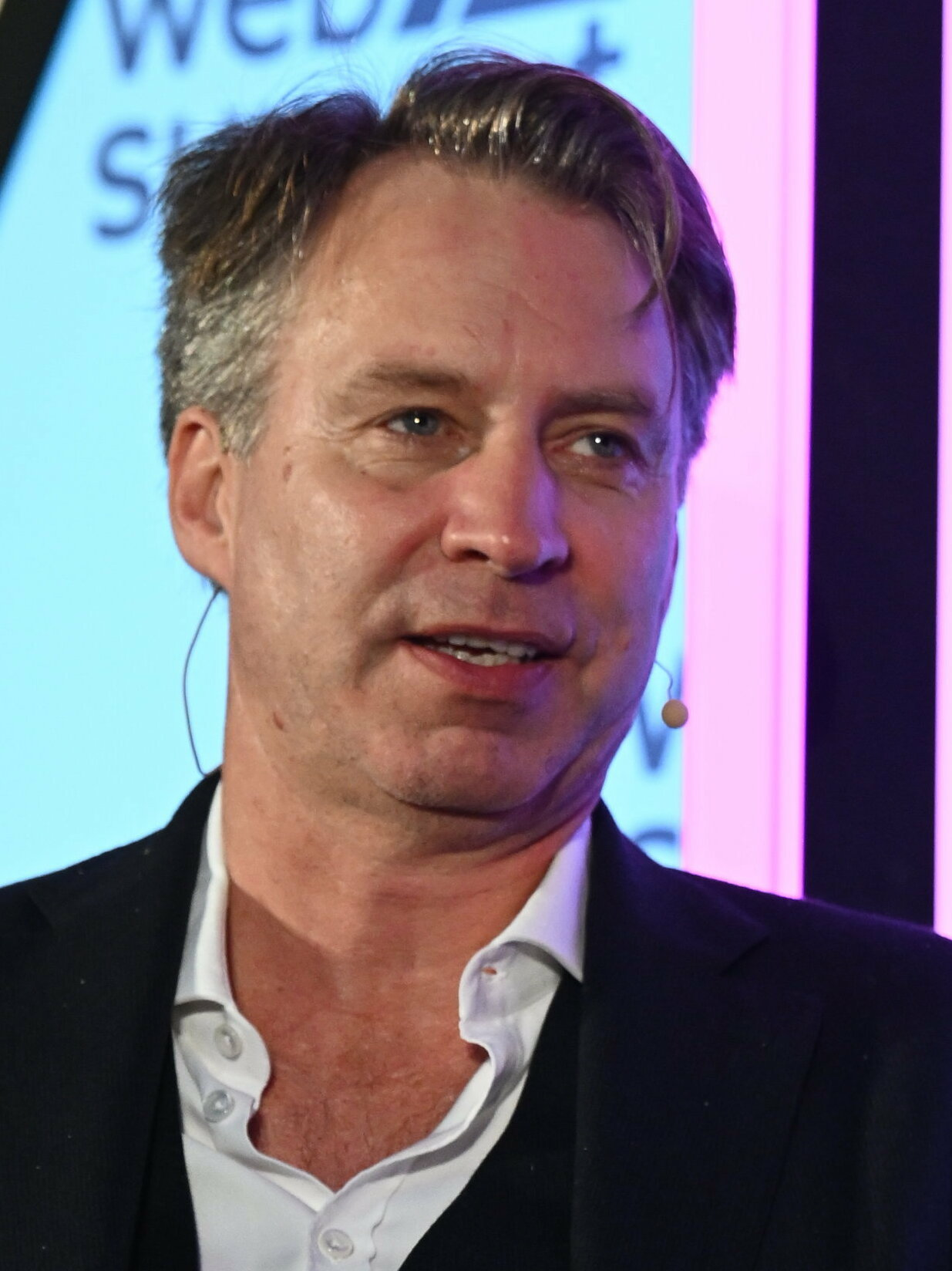
- Martin in 2023

Background information
- Born: 9 October 1969 (age 56); London, England
- Occupations: Record producer; songwriter; composer; multi-instrumentalist
- Label: C.A. Management

Giles Martin (born 9 October 1969) is an English record producer, songwriter, composer and multi-instrumentalist. His studio recordings, stage shows, TV and film works have been critically acclaimed and commercially successful around the world. He is the son of Beatles producer George Martin and half-brother of actor Gregory Paul Martin.

== Education ==
Martin was educated at Stowe School, a boarding independent school in the civil parish of Stowe in Buckinghamshire, leaving its boarding house, Lyttelton, in 1988, followed by the University of Manchester.

== Life and career ==
Giles Martin was born on 9 October 1969, which was also John Lennon's 29th birthday. He first played in the band Velvet Jones, then wrote jingles in college. In his teenage years, Giles worked as an assistant for his father, whose hearing started to decline in the mid-1970s; Giles noted that "I became his ears when I was quite young," helping George hide his disability from the public. In 1995, Giles was appointed music co-director for the television and radio music countdown show, The Great Music Experience. He worked on the Party at the Palace concert to celebrate Queen Elizabeth II's Golden Jubilee, for which he also produced the subsequent album and DVD.

In 2004 he produced Hayley Westenra's multi-platinum album Pure, the UK's fastest-selling classical album of all time. Other acts Martin has worked with include Kula Shaker, Jeff Beck, Elvis Costello, INXS, Kate Bush, Elton John and the Rolling Stones.

In 2006 Martin collaborated with his father to remix, rearrange and recombine the music of the Beatles into a soundscape for Love, a theatrical production of Cirque du Soleil, which opened at the Mirage in Las Vegas. His use of digital music production and manipulation techniques allowed him to create Love's musical mash-ups, which he updated in 2016 for the show's 10th anniversary. He produced the music for the final Broadway performance of Rent and worked with Martin Scorsese on his George Harrison film documentary Living in the Material World. Further film collaborations include working with Ron Howard on his Beatles documentary feature Eight Days A Week and the British action franchise Kingsman. Martin was music director for the Elton John biopic Rocketman.

In 2009 Martin returned to the Beatles' catalogue with The Beatles: Rock Band, a video game that allows players to simulate performing Beatles songs with plastic instruments. Martin produced the title's music, cleaning and reworking the audio to suit the game's mechanics. In 2013, Martin produced tracks and served as executive producer on Paul McCartney's New album. He was the producer in charge of the 50th anniversary Beatles remix/deluxe editions of Sgt. Pepper's Lonely Hearts Club Band (2017), the White Album (2018), Abbey Road (2019), Let It Be (2021), Revolver (2022), 1962–1966 (The Red Album) (2023), 1967–1970 (The Blue Album) (2023), and Rubber Soul (2026). Martin was music supervisor for the documentary series The Beatles: Get Back, as well as music mixer along with Sam Okell.

Martin has served as Head of Sound Experience since 2014 at Sonos Inc., a company which builds wireless home audio systems. In late 2018, Martin was appointed as Head of Audio and Sound of the Universal Music Group. The role was specifically created for Martin where he is based at UMG's Abbey Road Studios.

== Awards ==
Martin has received two Grammy awards, both in 2007 for the Love soundtrack album, as a producer of the Best Compilation Soundtrack Album For Motion Picture, Television Or Other Visual Media and as a surround producer of the Best Surround Sound Album.

In 2022, he won an Emmy award for his work on The Beatles: Get Back.

In October 2024, Martin was given an Honorary Doctorate of Music at the University of Winchester.

== Selected works ==
- 1994 The K's (also known as Kula Shaker) (GUT)
- 1994 My Life Story (Mother Tongue)
- 1995 The Glory of Gershwin (Mercury)
- 1995 The Choir (BBC)
- 1995 The Great Music Experience
- 1995/96 The Beatles Anthology (EMI/Apple)
- 1996 Monorail – Hairdressing (Edel)
- 1996/97/98 Velvet Jones (Naked)
- 1996/97 In My Life (Echo/MCA)
- 2000/01 The Alice Band (Instant Karma/Sony)
- 2002 Party at the Palace – Live show, CD and DVD releases (EMI/Virgin)
- 2003 Hayley Westenra – Pure (Universal/Decca)
- 2004 Willard White – My Way (Sony/BMG)
- 2004/05 Hayley Westenra – Odyssey (Universal/Decca)
- 2006 Love (Apple/Cirque du Soleil/MGM/EMI)
- 2007 Kim Richey – Chinese Boxes (Vanguard)
- 2007 Paco Peña – Requiem
- 2008 RENT – Live on Broadway (Sony Pictures)
- 2008/09 The Beatles Rock Band (MTV Networks)
- 2009/10/11 George Harrison: Living in the Material World
- 2012 George Harrison – Early Takes: Volume 1 (UM^{e})
- 2013 Paul McCartney – New (Hear Music)
- 2015 The Beatles – 1+ (Apple)
- 2016 The Beatles – Live at the Hollywood Bowl
- 2017 The Beatles – Sgt. Pepper's Lonely Hearts Club Band: 50th Anniversary Edition
- 2018 The Beatles – The Beatles: 50th Anniversary Edition (the "White Album": 50th Anniversary Edition)
- 2019 Rocketman – music director for Elton John biopic, directed by Dexter Fletcher
- 2019 The Beatles – Abbey Road: 50th Anniversary Edition
- 2020 The Rolling Stones – Goats Head Soup
- 2021 Original Sin – The Seven Sins
- 2021 The Beatles – Let It Be: Special Edition
- 2021 The Beatles: Get Back
- 2022 The Beatles – Revolver: Special Edition
- 2023 The Beatles – "Now and Then" single
- 2023 The Beatles – 1962–1966 (the "Red Album") and 1967-1970 (the "Blue Album"): 2023 Edition
- 2023 The Beach Boys – Pet Sounds (Dolby Atmos remix)
- 2024 The Beatles: 1964 U.S. Albums in Mono
- 2024 Beatles '64 documentary
- 2025 Anthology Collection box set and Anthology 4 30th Anniversary Edition (EMI/Apple)
- 2026 The Beatles - Rubber Soul: Special Edition
