= Josh Berger (sound engineer) =

American sound engineer

- Occupation: Re-recording mixer
- Years active: 2010–present
- Awards: Primetime Emmy Award (2025); Cinema Audio Society Award (2025)

Josh Berger is an American sound engineer based in New York City. He is a member of the Academy of Motion Picture Arts and Sciences, the Television Academy, the Cinema Audio Society and the Motion Picture Editors Guild.

== Selected filmography ==
=== Film ===
- 2026 – Focker-in-Law (upcoming)
- 2025 – Materialists
- 2024 – Babygirl
- 2023 – No Hard Feelings
- 2021 – King Richard
- 2020 – Hillbilly Elegy
- 2016 – The Lost City of Z

=== Documentary ===
- 2025 – The American Revolution
- 2024 – Beatles '64
- 2022 – Personality Crisis: One Night Only
- 2022 – The U.S. and the Holocaust

=== Television ===
- 2026 – East of Eden
- 2017 – Master of None

== Awards and nominations ==
Year	Award	Category	Work	Result	Ref.
2025	Primetime Creative Arts Emmy Awards	Outstanding Sound Mixing for a Nonfiction Program	Beatles '64	Won	
2025	61st Cinema Audio Society Awards	Outstanding Achievement in Sound Mixing for Television Non-Fiction, Variety or Music – Series or Specials	Beatles '64	Won	
2018	New York Emmy Awards	Audio	Billy Joel: New York State of Mind	Won	
2017	Primetime Creative Arts Emmy Awards	Outstanding Sound Mixing for a Comedy or Drama Series (Half-Hour) and Animation	Master of None ("The Dinner Party")	Nominated	
