= Don't Bother Me =

- Cover of the song's sheet music

Song by the Beatles

from the album With the Beatles
- Released: 22 November 1963
- Recorded: 12 September 1963
- Studio: EMI, London
- Genre: Rock and roll; beat
- Length: 2:29
- Label: Parlophone
- Songwriter: George Harrison
- Producer: George Martin

Audio sample
- "Don't Bother Me": file; help

"Don't Bother Me" is a song by the English rock band the Beatles from their 1963 UK album With the Beatles. It was the first song written by George Harrison, the group's lead guitarist, to appear on one of their albums. A midtempo rock and roll song, it was originally released in the United States on the 1964 album Meet the Beatles!

== Composition ==
Between 19 and 24 August 1963 the Beatles held a residency in Bournemouth, England with Billy J. Kramer & the Dakotas and Tommy Quickly. Feeling sick one day, George Harrison was prescribed tonic and bed rest by a doctor. With nothing to do in his room at the Palace Court Hotel, he began writing a song, recording himself on a portable tape recorder. The surviving recording includes him working on the bridge and whistling through the song's melody, likely because the song did not yet have lyrics.

Besides the 1958 song “In Spite of All The Danger” – co-written with McCartney, and the 1961 instrumental "Cry for a Shadow" – co-written as Lennon–Harrison, "Don't Bother Me" was Harrison's first composition. (Note: The 1958 recording "In Spite of All the Danger" is credited McCartney–Harrison, though McCartney wrote both the lyrics and melody. Harrison plays a guitar solo, with McCartney later explaining that the composing credit was given to Harrison because they both misunderstood how song crediting works.) Liverpool journalist Bill Harry claims that he encouraged Harrison to write a new song, and that Harrison's response of "Don't bother me" served as inspiration for the song's title. In his 1980 autobiography, I, Me, Mine, Harrison describes the song "as an exercise to see if I could write a song. ... I was sick in bed – maybe that's why it turned out to be Don't Bother Me." Published by the Dick James–Brian Epstein partnership, Jaep Music, this predated the five-year contract Harrison signed with Northern Songs on 9 November 1963.

After "Don't Bother Me", it was not until 1965's Help! album that any more Harrison-penned songs ("I Need You" and "You Like Me Too Much") would appear on record. "You Know What to Do" – another song by Harrison – was recorded in 1964, but was not released at the time.

== Musical structure ==
The sullen mood and desolate lyrics—"So go away, leave me alone, don't bother me"—were unusual for the Beatles at the time but would become characteristic for Harrison. The song follows the E Dorian mode: the Em of "since she's been gone" shifting to a v (Bm chord) on "gone" then an IV (A chord) on "no-one” in the verse. The chords of the chorus (Em-A-Em) also create the Dorian progression i-IV-i. The song achieves a thick sound through its double-tracked vocal, reverbed guitars, and busy drumming. The elaborate percussion lends the song a Latin rhythm accentuated by its stop-time structure.

== Recording ==
The Beatles first recorded the song in EMI's Studio Two on 11 September 1963. Recording seven takes, three of which were overdubs, none of these takes were used. Beatles historian Mark Lewisohn writes the results were deemed unsatisfactory, while Beatles writer John C. Winn writes the band ran out of time during their slated recording time. Returning to the studio the next day, the band remade the song from 7:00–11:30 pm, designating the first take as "take 10". George Martin produced, assisted by engineers Norman Smith and Richard Langham. Harrison sings lead vocal and plays the guitar solo on all tracks, complaining between takes about the difficulty this adds to performing. (Note: Everett writes that Harrison had consistent difficulties singing and playing simultaneously with similar complaints heard during the 1965 recording of "Help!".) Lennon plays rhythm guitar, trying to achieve a "dirty" sound on early takes by raising the signal gain on his Rickenbacker 325 Capri. Martin was unsatisfied with the effect and suggested the use of a compressor to flatten the guitar's dynamic range and achieve the desired "organ sound". Lennon's amp provides a tremolo effect, resulting in a more "sinister" sound in the refrain and bridge, similar to the timbre heard in songs by the Shadows. Take 13 was deemed best, allowing the band to proceed with overdubbing. Harrison records another vocal, double tracking his original, while McCartney plays claves, Lennon the tambourine and Starr an Arabian bongo. Recording concludes with take 19, the overdub of take 15 onto take 13 deemed "best".

Martin, Smith and Geoff Emerick mixed the track for mono on 30 September, then for stereo on 29 October. Another engineer assisted with stereo mixing, unidentified besides the initials "B. T." The stereo mix includes the end of "four" from Harrison's "one-two-three-four" count-in.

== Release and reception ==
With the Beatles was released by EMI's Parlophone label on 22 November 1963, with "Don't Bother Me" sequenced as the fourth track between "All My Loving" and "Little Child". Release in the US followed on 20 January 1964 on Capitol's Meet the Beatles!, sequenced as seventh and opening the second side of the record. Ian MacDonald writes reception to the song has generally been poor, with even Harrison himself subsequently discounting it. In I, Me, Mine, Harrison writes "I don't think it's a particularly good song, it mightn't even be a song at all but at least it showed me that all I needed to do was keep on writing and then maybe eventually I would write something good." Tim Riley describes it as a weak songwriting debut and demonstrates the strength of the Beatles as a group that they "find a groove in this tune despite its flaws." Mark Hertsgaard was more favourable to the song, describing it as one of the best on With the Beatles and "a promising premiere".

Everett describes the song as a watershed moment, being the first time a guitar tone was manipulated electronically. The contrasting timbres of the guitars are unique among the songs on Please Please Me and With the Beatles, going beyond their "typical homogeneity of sound". He writes that "Don't Bother Me" and the later "Baby's in Black" presage the band's subsequent work, such as the feedback heard on "It's All Too Much".

The song is heard in the Beatles 1964 film A Hard Day's Night. Along with other earlier numbers played in the film – "She Loves You", "I Wanna Be Your Man" and "All My Loving" – United Artists originally planned to include the song on the North American soundtrack album. After the band recorded enough new material, the label deemed the older songs' inclusion unnecessary.

British actor Gregory Phillips released a version of "Don't Bother Me" as his third single. Though unsuccessful, this was the first cover version of a Harrison composition.

== Personnel ==
According to Ian MacDonald, except where noted:

The Beatles

- George Harrison – double-tracked vocal, lead guitar
- John Lennon – rhythm guitar, tambourine
- Paul McCartney – bass, claves
- Ringo Starr – drums, bongos

Production

- George Martin – producer
- Norman Smith – engineer
- Richard Langham – engineer
