= Toxic Audio =

American a cappella group

- Also known as: Vox Audio
- Origin: Orlando, Florida, USA
- Genres: A cappella; comedy
- Years active: 1998–present
- Members: Michelle Mailhot-Valines; Shalisa James; Paul Sperrazza; Jeremy James; René Ruiz
- Website: http://www.voxaudiogroup.com/

Toxic Audio (known as Vox Audio outside the Orlando area) is a five-person a cappella singing group from Orlando, Florida. They began with appearances at the Orlando International Fringe Festival in the late 1990s. Frequent appearances at the Jazz Club in Pleasure Island at Walt Disney World Resort's Downtown Disney have increased their fame. They have released several CDs and performed live, including a run off Broadway in 2004 and tours in Europe and Japan. They have also performed at The Loft, in Dayton, Ohio.

Toxic Audio is popular for their dynamic and humorous performances, which often include audience participation. They are also adept at improvisation. They emphasize that all of the music and sound effects created in their performances are done entirely with their voices; no outside instruments are used. Five Toxic Audio albums have been released on CD with the addition of their new CD, Voice Activated in May 2012.

The group consists of five primary singers:

- Michelle Mailhot-Valines, soprano. Her specialty is scat singing.
- Shalisa James, alto. Her specialty is in knowing the exact lyrics to a vast number of songs.
- Paul Sperrazza, tenor. He does beatboxing and is known as the "human beat box" who imitates percussion.
- Jeremy James, baritone. He is skilled at rapping.
- René Ruiz, bass, the founder and original director of the group.

Other singers have been substituted on rare occasion.

John Valines III is the group's technical director and audio engineer.

The group's New York show, Loud Mouth, earned them the 2004 Drama Desk Award.

As of September 2005 the group performed at the Luxor Hotel in Las Vegas, NV.

Toxic Audio performed the song "Electric Blues" at the Hair Actor's Benefit Fund Concert in NYC

== Critical notices ==
Writing in the New York Times, Lawrence Van Gelder complimented and criticised the group:

"The voices of the five versatile and appealing singers are aided and abetted by an assortment of microphones as they work they [sic] way through numbers like Autumn Leaves, Dream a Little Dream, Paperback Writer, Thriller, Lean on Me and television theme songs. The selection is sure-fire, the presentation is frequently clever, and the cast is talented. But at bottom Toxic Audio in Loudmouth is the musical equivalent of a one-joke comedy."
