= The Donays =

The Donays were a 1960s R&B girl-group out of Hamtramck, Michigan. In 1961 the group recorded the Richard B. Drapkin (a.k.a. Ricky Dee) song "Devil in His Heart" for Detroit's Correc-tone Records. Possibly produced in Detroit by Richard "Popcorn" Wylie, it and "Bad Boy" may be the only Donays recordings.

In August, 1962 the recording was released as the B-side of "Bad Boy" on larger New York label Brent. The record was somehow discovered (perhaps by George Harrison, who sings the lead vocal) and recorded by the Beatles in 1963, retitled as "Devil in Her Heart".

The lead singer of The Donays was Yvonne Vernee Allen. A decade later, Motown group The Elgins (which broke up in 1967) reunited to tour Britain in 1971 after it enjoyed two unexpected UK Top 20 hits. Yvonne, previously a session vocalist, took the place of former lead vocalist Saundra Mallett Edwards. The reunion sputtered. Yvonne continued singing into the 1990s, working for Ian Levine's Motor City label.
