= Indigo Moss =

Alternative rock and roll bluegrass band

- Origin: London, England
- Genres: Alternative; Bluegrass; Folk-Rock
- Years active: 2005–2008
- Label: Butterfly Recordings
- Past members: Trevor Moss & Hannah-Lou; Daisy Moss; Simon Moss 'B' Moss

Indigo Moss were an alternative rock and roll bluegrass band based in London, England.

== Band members ==
- Trevor Moss - Vocals, guitar, banjo, mandolin
- Hannah-Lou Moss - Vocals, banjo, guitar
- Lil' Daisy Moss - Bass guitar (2005–2007)
- Simon Moss - Mandolin (2005–2007)
- 'B' Moss - Drums (2005–2007)

== History ==
The band began as buskers at South Kensington tube station in London. They were signed to Butterfly Records, a record label owned by record producer Martin Glover (commonly known as Youth) and Simon Tong (former member of The Verve and The Shining and current member of super group The Good, the Bad & the Queen and folk group Carnival).

Their first single, "Start Over Again", was released 27 November 2006 on Butterfly Recordings. This was followed by "Dang Nabitt" on 4 April 2007, and their eponymous debut album on 9 April 2007. Their debut album was recorded at Damon Albarn's studio 13 and was produced by Simon Tong. The album garnered much critical acclaim with The Times calling it "joyous" and giving it 4 out of 5 stars (6 April 2007). NME said "They mix traditional Brit folk with early rock and then add a twist of bluegrass" (17 February 2007, whilst Uncut called it "A curious clash of cultures that doubtless attracted the attention of Damon Albarn. They're much more than just another Americana outfit" (4/5 Stars - March 2007). Mojo said that "A feeling for melody and harmony pulls the band beyond their influences" (4/5 Stars - May 2007).

They have previously recorded material at Olympic Studios, but these sessions have not surfaced and it is widely believed they were used as demos for the songs recorded at 13 for use on their album, Indigo Moss. The band appeared in the film Freebird which starred British actor Phil Daniels. They were also credited on the soundtrack as they provided songs and instrumental music.

February 2007 saw them supporting The Good, the Bad & the Queen, playing to audiences from around England and Scotland.

In mid-2007, the line-up of the band changed dramatically, with Simon, Lil' Daisy and 'B' all leaving to pursue other interests. Rhythm section duo Andy Bruce and Alex Walker were brought in for live shows in early 2008. By June 2008, founding members (and married couple) Trevor Moss and Hannah-Lou had ditched the Indigo Moss name to work as a duo.

Trevor Moss and Hannah-Lou still perform as a folk duo, regularly around the UK and occasionally in Europe. They have to date released three albums.

== Discography ==
=== Singles ===
- "Start Over Again" - 27 November 2006, Butterfly Recordings
- "Dang Nabitt" - 26 March 2007, Butterfly Recordings
- "Nature Of This Town" - 8 October 2007, Butterfly Recordings

=== Albums ===
- Indigo Moss

=== Compilation albums featuring Indigo Moss songs ===
- Replugged in New Cross - Various Artists 29 May 2006, Mile High Recordings ASIN: B000FS996S
- What the Folk - Various Artists 26 February 2007, Butterfly Recordings ASIN: B000MBXV26
- I Love NX – Replugged in New Cross Contribution: "Suicide Song", Release date: 29 May 2006, Cargo Records MHM004
- What The Folk – Butterfly Acoustic Recordings Vol.1 Contribution – "OK Without You", Release date: 26 February 2007, Butterfly Recordings BARCDLP01
- What The Folk – Butterfly Recordings Vol.2 Contribution – "A Hill Far, Far Away" Trevor Moss & Hannah-Lou Release date: 14 April 2008, Butterfly Recordings BRCD
