= Revolver: Special Edition =

- Digital super deluxe cover

Compilation album by the Beatles
- Released: 28 October 2022
- Recorded: 6 April – 21 June 1966
- Studios: EMI, London
- Genres: Rock; pop; psychedelia; avant-pop
- Length: 161:58
- Label: Apple
- Producers: George Martin (original recordings); Giles Martin (remix)

The Beatles chronology
Get Back – The Rooftop Performance (2022)	Revolver: Special Edition (2022)	The Beatles: 1964 U.S. Albums in Mono (2024)

Revolver: Special Edition is an expanded reissue of the 1966 album Revolver by the English rock band the Beatles. It was released on 28 October 2022, and includes a new stereo remix of the album by Giles Martin and Sam Okell, with the help of de-mixing technology developed by Peter Jackson's WingNut Films. It also includes the original mono mix, session recordings, demos, and an EP including new mixes of the non-album single "Paperback Writer" and its B-side, "Rain", recorded during the Revolver sessions.

== Background ==
Giles Martin had previously expressed interest in remixing the Beatles' pre-Sgt. Pepper albums via special "demixing" technology developed at Abbey Road Studios, but wanted to wait until the software improved enough to be used in such a project. Speaking to Rolling Stone in July 2021, Martin said that the software was "getting a lot better" and that he was "constantly looking at how we could approach it if I ever get to [remix] Revolver or Rubber Soul, early albums, which a lot of people want me to do". In October 2021, Martin told Super Deluxe Edition: "I don't think it's ready at this moment in time", but noted about Revolver: "There's not as much bouncing down on Revolver as there is on Pepper. There's not that many instruments, it's not that complex."

[On "Taxman"] I can take off the guitar, I can take off the bass, and then I can even separate the snare drum and kick drum as well. And they sound like the snare drum and kick drum. There's no hint of guitar on there (even though they'd been baked together on the master tapes). And I don't know how it's done! It's like I'm giving them a cake and they're giving me flour, eggs, and milk and some sugar.

— Giles Martin on the "demixing" technology used to remix the album

In late August 2022, Martin confirmed via Twitter that Revolver would receive a remix, with a further tweet hinting at an additional surround sound mix. The reissue was officially announced on 7 September 2022. Martin confirmed that the "demixing" technology had improved considerably by that point, and credited the work done by Peter Jackson's audio team in the development of The Beatles: Get Back for making the new remix possible. To promote the reissue, the new mix for the album's opening track, "Taxman", was released as a preview.

== Content ==
The remixed and expanded edition of Revolver was released on 28 October 2022. The editions include a five-CD or four-LP/one 7-inch-EP super deluxe set, containing the half-speed remastered original album in both stereo and mono, demos and sessions, the EP, and a 100-page book; a deluxe edition, featuring an abridged 40-page book, the new stereo mix, session highlights, and stereo mixes of the singles; and standard digital, CD, and vinyl releases. Following the announcement of these editions in September, a preview of the 2022 mix of "Taxman" was released on Spotify and iTunes. The new mixes of the original album tracks, as well as of "Paperback Writer" and "Rain", were also released on streaming services in Dolby Atmos.

The 100-page book features a foreword by Paul McCartney; an introduction by Giles Martin; an essay by Questlove; and track notes by author Kevin Howlett. The book is illustrated with images of handwritten lyrics, tape boxes, and recording sheets, as well as 1966 print ads and extracts from the graphic novel, Revolver 50: Birth of an Icon, written and illustrated by Klaus Voormann.

Along with the restoration of the original album artwork by Voormann, the record sleeve that holds the session outtakes features Robert Freeman's proposed cover design, featuring the heads of the Beatles in a psychedelic circle.

== Reception ==
On Metacritic, Revolver: Special Edition holds an aggregate score of 100 out of 100, based on nine reviews, indicating "universal acclaim".

Annie Zaleski of The Guardian gave the album five out of five stars, writing: "Revolver's new details tease out deeper meanings in the songs. Now more prominent, the low-lit backing harmonies on 'Here, There and Everywhere' remake the tune as an old-fashioned rock'n'roll love song; the piano bending out of key on 'I Want to Tell You' mirrors the narrator's insecurity; and McCartney's booming walking bass on 'Taxman' illuminates the biting, cynical tone of Harrison's lyrics ... Revolver still sounds so vibrant."

== Track listings ==
All tracks written by Lennon–McCartney, except where noted. (Note: All lead vocalist credits and track lengths per Harry Castleman and Walter Podrazik.)

=== Revolver (2022 stereo remix) ===
Side one
No.	Title	Lead vocals	Length
1.	"Taxman" (George Harrison)	Harrison	2:36
2.	"Eleanor Rigby"	McCartney	2:11
3.	"I'm Only Sleeping"	Lennon	2:58
4.	"Love You To" (Harrison)	Harrison	3:00
5.	"Here, There and Everywhere"	McCartney	2:29
6.	"Yellow Submarine"	Starr	2:40
7.	"She Said She Said"	Lennon	2:39
Total length:			18:33

Side two
No.	Title	Lead vocals	Length
1.	"Good Day Sunshine"	McCartney	2:08
2.	"And Your Bird Can Sing"	Lennon	2:02
3.	"For No One"	McCartney	2:03
4.	"Doctor Robert"	Lennon	2:14
5.	"I Want to Tell You" (Harrison)	Harrison	2:30
6.	"Got to Get You into My Life"	McCartney	2:31
7.	"Tomorrow Never Knows"	Lennon	3:00
Total length:			16:28

=== Revolver sessions ===
Side one
No.	Title	Original Release	Length
1.	"Tomorrow Never Knows" (Take 1)	Anthology 2	3:32
2.	"Tomorrow Never Knows" (Mono Mix: RM11)	Revolver (Very First UK Pressings)	3:05
3.	"Got To Get You Into My Life" (First Version: Take 5)	Anthology 2	4:10
4.	"Got To Get You Into My Life" (Second Version: Unnumbered Mono Mix)		2:36
5.	"Got To Get You Into My Life" (Second Version: Take 8)		2:48
6.	"Love You To" (Take 1)		2:40
7.	"Love You To" (Unnumbered rehearsal)		1:35

Side two
No.	Title	Original Release	Length
1.	"Love You To" (Take 7)		2:55
2.	"Paperback Writer" (Takes 1 & 2)		3:38
3.	"Rain" (Take 5: Actual Speed)		2:38
4.	"Rain" (Take 5: Slowed Down for Master Tape)		3:12
5.	"Doctor Robert" (Take 7)		2:59
6.	"And Your Bird Can Sing" (First Version: Take 2)		2:14
7.	"And Your Bird Can Sing" (First Version: Take 2 with giggling)	Anthology 2	2:23

Side three
No.	Title	Original Release	Length
1.	"And Your Bird Can Sing" (Second Version: Take 5)		2:20
2.	"Taxman" (Take 11)	Anthology 2	2:37
3.	"I'm Only Sleeping" (Rehearsal fragment)	Anthology 2	0:48
4.	"I'm Only Sleeping" (Take 2)		2:28
5.	"I'm Only Sleeping" (Take 5)		2:43
6.	"I'm Only Sleeping" (Mono Mix: RM1)		3:07
7.	"Eleanor Rigby" (Speech before Take 2)		2:11
8.	"Eleanor Rigby" (Take 2)		2:20

Side four
No.	Title	Original Release	Length
1.	"For No One" (Take 10)		2:23
2.	"Yellow Submarine" (Songwriting Work Tape: Part 1)		1:04
3.	"Yellow Submarine" (Songwriting Work Tape: Part 2)		4:42
4.	"Yellow Submarine" (Take 4 Before Sound Effects)		2:37
5.	"Yellow Submarine" (Highlighted Sound Effects)	Real Love EP	2:43
6.	"I Want To Tell You" (Speech and Take 4)		1:24
7.	"Here, There And Everywhere" (Take 6)		2:29
8.	"She Said She Said" (John's Demo)		1:10
9.	"She Said She Said" (Take 15: Backing Track Rehearsal)		3:24

=== Original Mono Mix ===
Side one
No.	Title	Lead vocals	Length
1.	"Taxman" (Harrison)	Harrison	2:36
2.	"Eleanor Rigby"	McCartney	2:11
3.	"I'm Only Sleeping"	Lennon	2:58
4.	"Love You To" (Harrison)	Harrison	3:09
5.	"Here, There and Everywhere"	McCartney	2:29
6.	"Yellow Submarine"	Starr	2:40
7.	"She Said She Said"	Lennon	2:39
Total length:			18:46

Side two
No.	Title	Lead vocals	Length
1.	"Good Day Sunshine"	McCartney	2:08
2.	"And Your Bird Can Sing"	Lennon	2:02
3.	"For No One"	McCartney	2:03
4.	"Doctor Robert"	Lennon	2:14
5.	"I Want to Tell You" (Harrison)	Harrison	2:30
6.	"Got to Get You into My Life"	McCartney	2:35
7.	"Tomorrow Never Knows"	Lennon	3:00
Total length:			16:40

=== Revolver: Bonus EP ===
Side one
No.	Title	Lead vocals	Length
1.	"Paperback Writer" (New Stereo Mix)	McCartney	2:16
2.	"Rain" (New Stereo Mix)	Lennon	3:01
Total length:			5:15

Side two
No.	Title	Lead vocals	Length
1.	"Paperback Writer" (Original Mono Mix Remastered)	McCartney	2:26
2.	"Rain" (Original Mono Mix Remastered)	Lennon	3:01
Total length:			5:25

== Personnel ==
- Giles Martin – production and mixing
- Sam Okell – engineering and mixing
- Miles Showell – mastering (2022 stereo mixes, single EP)
- Alex Wharton – mastering (Sessions)
- Sean Magee – mastering (2022 mono vinyl remaster)
- Thomas Hall – mastering (2022 mono CD remaster)
- Emile de la Rey – head of machine learning
- Matthew Cocker – engineering (archive tape transfer, Sessions demonstration mixes)
- Kevin Howlett – liner notes, archive tape research, editing
- Mike Heatley – archive tape research, editing
- Darren Evans – art director
- Aaron Bremner – photo editing and research
- Dorcas Lynn – photo editing and research
- Steve Tribe – copy editor

== Charts ==
Chart performance for Revolver: Special Edition
Chart (2022)	Peak position
Australian Albums (ARIA)	2
Austrian Albums (Ö3 Austria)	2
Belgian Albums (Ultratop Flanders)	5
Belgian Albums (Ultratop Wallonia)	5
Canadian Albums (Billboard)	6
Danish Albums (Hitlisten)	5
Dutch Albums (Album Top 100)	3
Finnish Albums (Suomen virallinen lista)	18
Irish Albums (Official Charts)	3
Italian Albums (FIMI)	17
Japanese Albums (Oricon)	5
Japanese Combined Albums (Oricon)	6
Japanese Hot Albums (Billboard Japan)	4
New Zealand Albums (RMNZ)	2
Norwegian Albums (VG-lista)	6
Portuguese Albums (AFP)	3
Scottish Albums (Official Charts)	1
Spanish Albums (Promusicae)	5
Swedish Albums (Sverigetopplistan)	4
Swiss Albums (Schweizer Hitparade)	4
UK Albums (Official Charts)	2
US Billboard 200	4

== See also ==
- Outline of the Beatles
- The Beatles timeline

== Sources ==
- Castleman, Harry; Podrazik, Walter J. (1976). All Together Now: The First Complete Beatles Discography 1961–1975. New York City: Ballantine Books. ISBN 0-345-25680-8.
- Lewisohn, Mark (2010) [1992]. The Complete Beatles Chronicle: The Definitive Day-by-Day Guide to the Beatles' Entire Career. Chicago, Illinois: Chicago Review Press. ISBN 978-1-56976-534-0.
