= It Won't Be Long =

- The German single release of the song, backed with "Devil in Her Heart"

Song by the Beatles

from the album With the Beatles
- Published: Northern Songs
- Released: 22 November 1963
- Recorded: 30 July 1963
- Studio: EMI, London
- Genre: Merseybeat, rock
- Length: 2:13
- Label: Parlophone
- Songwriter: Lennon–McCartney
- Producer: George Martin

"It Won't Be Long" is a song by the English rock band the Beatles, released as the opening track on their second UK album With the Beatles (1963), and was the first original song recorded for it. Although credited to Lennon–McCartney, it was primarily a composition by John Lennon, with Paul McCartney assisting with the lyrics and arrangement.

== Composition ==
John Lennon claimed in both 1971 and 1980 that he was the primary author of the song. In the 1990s, Paul McCartney described the track as predominantly Lennon's work, but acknowledged it was a collaborative effort, stating: "John mainly sang it so I expect that it was his original idea, but we both sat down and wrote it together." The chorus features a pun on the words "be long" and "belong."

Musically, the song displays early Beatles trademarks such as call-and-response "yeah-yeahs" and ascending and descending guitar riffs. It also reflects the melodramatic stylings characteristic of their early period, culminating in an abrupt musical pause that allows Lennon a brief moment of solo vocal improvisation. The finale resolves in a barber shop-style major seventh chord, reminiscent of the contemporary Beatles hit "She Loves You", which ends similarly on a major sixth.

The song's middle eight features chromatically descending chords accompanied by vocal counterpoint from Lennon, McCartney, and Harrison, adding harmonic depth.

In one of his final interviews, Lennon remarked to Playboy magazine that the song marked the beginning of the Beatles reaching a broader audience beyond their original youthful fanbase from their Liverpool club days. He recalled: "It was only after a critic for the [London] Times said we put 'Aeolian cadences' in 'It Won't Be Long' that the middle classes started listening to us. ... To this day, I have no idea what 'Aeolian cadences' are. They sound like exotic birds." In fact, the critic, William Mann, had actually made that remark about the song "Not a Second Time."

Rolling Stone later described "It Won't Be Long" as "the kind of song Bob Dylan had in mind when he wrote that Beatles chords were 'outrageous, just outrageous.'" Despite their lack of formal training in music theory, Lennon and McCartney incorporated unconventional harmonic progressions, with the song shifting from its home key of E major to unexpected chords in D, C, F♯, and a “hybrid” of D and Bm.

== Recording and release ==
The Beatles recorded this song on 30 July 1963 in two sessions. The first session was in the morning, where they recorded ten takes. The second session was in the afternoon, where they recorded seven more takes. The final product was a combination of takes 17 and 21, put together on 21 August.

The original release in the UK was on With the Beatles, on 22 November 1963. In the US, "It Won't Be Long" first appeared on Meet the Beatles!, released 20 January 1964.

The song was never performed live or at any of the group's BBC sessions, although they did lip-synch to the track on an edition of Ready Steady Go! in March 1964.

== Personnel ==
According to Ian MacDonald:

- John Lennon – double-tracked vocal, rhythm guitar
- Paul McCartney – backing vocal, bass
- George Harrison – backing vocal, lead guitar
- Ringo Starr – drums
- George Martin – producer
- Norman Smith – engineer
