= With the Beatles =

1963 studio album by the Beatles

Studio album by the Beatles
- Released: 22 November 1963
- Recorded: 18 July – 23 October 1963
- Studios: EMI, London
- Genres: Merseybeat; rock and roll; pop; R&B
- Length: 33:07
- Label: Parlophone
- Producer: George Martin

The Beatles chronology
Please Please Me (1963)	With the Beatles (1963)	A Hard Day's Night (1964)

Alternative cover
- Australian cover

The Beatles North American chronology
Beatlemania! With the Beatles (1963)	Introducing... The Beatles (1964)

The Beatles Canadian chronology
Beatlemania! With the Beatles (1963)	Twist and Shout (1964)

With the Beatles is the second studio album by the English rock band the Beatles. It was released in the United Kingdom on 22 November 1963 on Parlophone, eight months after the release of the band's debut album, Please Please Me. Produced by George Martin, the album features eight original compositions (seven by Lennon–McCartney and "Don't Bother Me", George Harrison's first recorded solo composition) and six covers (mostly of rock and roll and Motown R&B hits). The sessions also yielded the non-album single, "I Want to Hold Your Hand" backed by "This Boy". The cover photograph was taken by the fashion photographer Robert Freeman and has since been mimicked by several music groups. A different cover was used for the Australian release of the album, which the Beatles were displeased with.

In the United States, the album's tracks were unevenly split over the group's first two albums released on Capitol Records: Meet the Beatles! and The Beatles' Second Album. It was also released in Canada under the name Beatlemania! With the Beatles. The album was ranked number 420 on Rolling Stone magazine's list of the 500 Greatest Albums of All Time in 2003, and was included in Robert Dimery's 1001 Albums You Must Hear Before You Die (2010). It was also voted number 275 in the third edition of English writer Colin Larkin's All Time Top 1000 Albums (2000).

== Recording ==
In 1963, musical groups were typically required to release more than one LP a year. As such, the Beatles' producer George Martin and manager Brian Epstein planned for the band to release two LPs and four singles every year. Shortly after recording the non-album single "She Loves You" on 1 July 1963, the Beatles returned to London's EMI Studios only four months after the release of Please Please Me. Unlike their debut, the bulk of whose tracks (10 of the 14, excluding previously issued singles) were recorded in one day, With the Beatles was recorded over seven sessions across three months. On 18 July, the group tracked four covers: the Miracles' "You Really Got a Hold on Me", Barrett Strong's "Money (That's What I Want)", the Donays' "Devil in His Heart", albeit retitled "Devil in Her Heart", and Meredith Willson's "Till There Was You", although this recording was deemed unsatisfactory.

The Beatles reconvened at the studio on the morning of 30 July, recording a cover of the Marvelettes' "Please Mr. Postman" and beginning work on the first new Lennon–McCartney song, "It Won't Be Long". Following a break to record a BBC radio session for Saturday Club, they returned in the late-afternoon, recording overdubs on "Money", a remake of "Till There Was You" and a cover of Chuck Berry's "Roll Over Beethoven". The session ended with finishing touches on "It Won't Be Long" and recording Paul McCartney's "All My Loving", which Beatles historian Mark Lewisohn described as "by far his best, most complex piece of songwriting yet." "She Loves You", backed by "I'll Get You", was issued as a single on 23 August and was the group's first single to sell over a million copies in Britain alone.

After a break, the Beatles returned to EMI on 11 September 1963. They attempted John Lennon's "Little Child" and drummer Ringo Starr's vocal contribution to the album, "I Wanna Be Your Man", a Lennon–McCartney original that was given to the Rolling Stones, who released it as their second single; both attempts were deemed unsatisfactory. The group started and finished Lennon's compositions "All I've Got to Do" and "Not a Second Time", and began recording Harrison's first solo composition, "Don't Bother Me", which was also left unfinished. The next day, the band remade "Hold Me Tight", which was attempted earlier in the year on 11 February, finished "Little Child" and "Don't Bother Me", but again left "I Wanna Be Your Man" unfinished. On 30 September, Martin added piano and Hammond organ overdubs to "Money" and "I Wanna Be Your Man", respectively, while the band were on holidays. The band returned on 3 October, recording more takes of "I Wanna Be Your Man".

Four-track recording was installed at EMI before the 17 October session, when the Beatles recorded their new non-album single, "I Want to Hold Your Hand" / "This Boy", as well as speeches for a Christmas record for the band's fan club. The band finished up "I Wanna Be Your Man" on 23 October before Martin commenced mono and stereo mixing the same day and continuing six days later. Final preparations were made on 30 October, with the album officially completed on 4 November.

== Packaging ==
Impressed with Robert Freeman's black-and-white pictures of John Coltrane, Epstein invited the photographer to create the cover image. Harrison later said that, whereas the cover of Please Please Me had been "crap", their second LP was "the beginning of us being actively involved in the Beatles' artwork ... the first one where we thought, 'Hey, let's get artistic.'" The group asked Freeman to take inspiration from pictures their friend Astrid Kirchherr had taken in Hamburg between 1960 and 1962, featuring the band members in half-shadow and not smiling. To achieve this result, on 22 August 1963, Freeman photographed them in a dark corridor of the Palace Court Hotel in Bournemouth, where the band were playing a summer residency at the local Gaumont Cinema. To fit the square format of the cover, he put Starr in the bottom right corner, "since he was the last to join the group. He was also the shortest". McCartney described the result as "very moody", adding: "people think he must have worked at [it] forever and ever. But it was an hour. He sat down, took a couple of rolls, and he had it."

The original concept was to paint the picture from edge to edge, with no bleeding, title or artist credit – a concept that went against music industry practice and was immediately vetoed by EMI. The first album to carry an edge-to-edge cover was the Rolling Stones' self-titled debut, released five months later. EMI also objected to the fact that the Beatles were not smiling; it was only after George Martin intervened, as head of Parlophone, that the cover portrait was approved. Freeman was paid £75 for his work, which was three times the fee first offered by EMI.

Music critic John Harris finds the cover most reminiscent of the photos Kirchherr took in Hamburg of Lennon, Harrison and Stuart Sutcliffe using the "half-lit technique" and says that, together with songs such as "Roll Over Beethoven" and "Money (That's What I Want)", With the Beatles thereby represents "a canny repackaging of their early '60s incarnation: Hamburg shorn of Prellies and leather, and sold to their public as a mixture of accomplished rock 'n' roll and art-house cool". Harris also sees the LP cover as a "watershed" design that encouraged other acts to eschew "the more cartoonish aspects of pop photography" and continued to exert an influence in the 1970s on covers such as those for Lou Reed's Transformer (1972), Patti Smith's Horses (1975) and various punk rock albums.

EMI Australia did not receive the cover art (there were union restrictions on importing negatives for printing) and used different shots of the band in a similar style to the black-and-white photograph on other releases. The Beatles were unaware of this until fans showed them the cover during their only Australian tour, and informed the EMI publicity staff that they were not pleased with the substitution.

The same photo with a blue tint was used for the cover of the US release Meet The Beatles!

== Release and reception ==
Professional ratings
Review scores
Source	Rating
AllMusic	5/5 stars
The A.V. Club	A
Blender	4/5 stars
Encyclopedia of Popular Music	4/5 stars
MusicHound	3/5
Pitchfork	8.8/10
Paste	87/100
Record Collector	4/5 stars
Rolling Stone	5/5 stars
The Rolling Stone Album Guide	4.5/5 stars

Parlophone issued With the Beatles on 22 November 1963, eight months to the day after Please Please Me, with the catalogue number PMC 1206. The album became the first Beatles album released in North America when it was released in Canada on 25 November 1963 under the augmented title Beatlemania! With the Beatles, with additional text on the album cover, and issued only in mono at the time, catalogue number T 6051 (a stereo Canadian release would come in 1968, catalogue number ST 6051). For the United States release, the original running order of With the Beatles was unevenly split over the group's first two Capitol albums: nine tracks were issued on Meet the Beatles! (the eight original compositions plus "Till There Was You"), while the remaining five songs, all cover versions, were placed on The Beatles' Second Album.

The LP had advance orders of a half million and sold another half million by September 1965, making it the second album to sell a million copies in the United Kingdom, after the soundtrack to the 1958 film South Pacific. With the Beatles remained at the top of the charts for 21 weeks, displacing Please Please Me, so that the Beatles occupied the top spot for 51 consecutive weeks. It even reached number 11 in the "singles charts" (because at the time UK charts counted all records sold, regardless of format). No other group or singer has achieved 51 consecutive weeks at number 1 in the album charts. However, the soundtrack for South Pacific did achieve 70 consecutive weeks at number one in the album charts. Reviewing the album on release for Record Mirror, Peter Jones hailed With the Beatles as an improvement over Please Please Me, praising the covers and originals, particularly Harrison's "Don't Bother Me".

On 26 February 1987, With the Beatles was officially released on compact disc (in mono only, catalogue number CDP 7 46436 2). Having been available only as an import in the US in the past, the album was also issued domestically in the US on LP and cassette on 21 July 1987. Along with the rest of the Beatles' canon, it was re-released on CD in newly re-mastered stereo and mono versions on 9 September 2009.

The album was ranked number 420 on Rolling Stone magazine's list of the 500 Greatest Albums of All Time in 2003, and was included in Robert Dimery's 1001 Albums You Must Hear Before You Die. It was voted number 275 in the third edition of English writer Colin Larkin's All Time Top 1000 Albums. It was rated the 29th greatest album in the book Paul Gambaccini Presents the Top 100 Albums. This book "canvassed a panel of experts in seven countries" to determine the greatest albums.

== Track listing ==
All tracks are written by Lennon–McCartney, except where noted.

Side one
No.	Title	Writer(s)	Lead vocals	Length
1.	"It Won't Be Long"		Lennon	2:13
2.	"All I've Got to Do"		Lennon	2:02
3.	"All My Loving"		McCartney	2:07
4.	"Don't Bother Me"	George Harrison	Harrison	2:28
5.	"Little Child"		Lennon with McCartney	1:46
6.	"Till There Was You"	Meredith Willson	McCartney	2:14
7.	"Please Mr. Postman"	Georgia Dobbins; William Garrett; Freddie Gorman; Brian Holland; Robert Bateman	Lennon	2:34
Total length:				15:24

Side two
No.	Title	Writer(s)	Lead vocals	Length
1.	"Roll Over Beethoven"	Chuck Berry	Harrison	2:45
2.	"Hold Me Tight"		McCartney	2:32
3.	"You Really Got a Hold on Me"	Smokey Robinson	Lennon with Harrison	3:01
4.	"I Wanna Be Your Man"		Starr	1:59
5.	"Devil in Her Heart"	Richard Drapkin	Harrison	2:28
6.	"Not a Second Time"		Lennon	2:07
7.	"Money (That's What I Want)"	Janie Bradford; Berry Gordy	Lennon	2:49
Total length:				17:43

== Personnel ==
According to Mark Lewisohn:

The Beatles

- John Lennon – lead, harmony and backing vocals; acoustic and electric rhythm guitars; handclaps; harmonica on "Little Child"; nylon-string acoustic rhythm guitar on "Till There Was You"; tambourine on "Don't Bother Me"
- Paul McCartney – lead, harmony and backing vocals; bass guitar; handclaps; piano on "Little Child", claves on "Don't Bother Me"
- George Harrison – lead, harmony and backing vocals; lead and acoustic guitars; handclaps; nylon-string acoustic lead guitar on "Till There Was You"
- Ringo Starr – drums, tambourine, maracas, handclaps; lead vocals on "I Wanna Be Your Man", Arabian loose-skin bongo on "Till There Was You" and "Don't Bother Me"

Production

- Robert Freeman – cover photograph
- George Martin – arrangement, production and mixing; piano on "You Really Got a Hold on Me", "Not a Second Time" and "Money"; organ on "I Wanna Be Your Man"
- Norman Smith – engineering and mixing

== Charts ==
Weekly chart performance for With the Beatles
Chart (1963–65)	Peak position
Canada (CHUM Chart Top Albums)	1
German Albums (Offizielle Top 100)	1
Finland (Suomen virallinen lista)	5
UK Record Retailer LPs Chart	1
Chart (1987)	Peak position
Dutch Albums (Album Top 100)	25
Chart (2009)	Peak position
Belgian Albums (Ultratop Flanders)	83
Belgian Albums (Ultratop Wallonia)	88
Finnish Albums (Suomen virallinen lista)	31
Italian Albums (FIMI)	82
Spanish Albums (Promusicae)	70
Swedish Albums (Sverigetopplistan)	34
Swiss Albums (Schweizer Hitparade)	73
Chart (2010)	Peak position
US Billboard 200	179

== Certifications and sales ==
Certifications and sales for With the Beatles
Region	Certification	Certified units/sales
Argentina (CAPIF)	Gold	30,000^{^}
Australia (ARIA)	Gold	35,000^{^}
Canada (Music Canada)	Gold	50,000^{^}
Germany (BVMI)	Gold	250,000^{^}
United Kingdom Original release	—	1,000,000
United Kingdom (BPI) 2009 release	Gold	100,000^{^}
United States Original release	—	1,000,000
United States (RIAA) 1987 release	Gold	500,000^{^}
Summaries
Worldwide Original release	—	5,000,000
^{^} Shipments figures based on certification alone.

^{†} BPI certification awarded only for sales since 1994.

== See also ==
- Outline of the Beatles
- The Beatles timeline
- The Beatles albums discography

== Sources ==
- Baker, Glenn A.; Dilernia, Roger (1985). The Beatles Down Under: The 1964 Australia & New Zealand Tour. Ann Arbor, MC: Pierian Press. ISBN 978-0-87650-186-3.
- The Beatles (2000). The Beatles Anthology. San Francisco, CA: Chronicle Books. ISBN 978-0-8118-2684-6. Archived from the original on 22 February 2017.
- Lewisohn, Mark (1988). The Beatles Recording Sessions. New York: Harmony Books. ISBN 978-0-517-57066-1.
- Lewisohn, Mark (1992). The Complete Beatles Chronicle. New York: Harmony Books. ISBN 978-0-517-58100-1.
- Miles, Barry (2001). The Beatles Diary Volume 1: The Beatles Years. London: Omnibus Press. ISBN 0-7119-8308-9.
- Whitburn, Joel (2007). Billboard Top Pop Singles 1955–2006. Menomonee Falls, Wisconsin: Record Research Inc. ISBN 978-0-89820-172-7.
