= Devil in His Heart =

Song

Single by the Donays
- B-side: "Bad Boy"
- Released: August 1962
- Label: Correc-Tone; Brent (7033); Oriole (UK; CBA 1770)
- Songwriter: Richard B. 'Ricky Dee' Drapkin

"Devil in His Heart" is a song written by American musician Richard B. Drapkin, who released it under the name Ricky Dee in August 1962. It was also covered by the Beatles on their 1963 album With the Beatles, with the title changed to "Devil in Her Heart".

== Recordings ==
The song was originally recorded as "Devil in His Heart" in Detroit by the Donays for Correc-tone Records. It was later picked up by the New York City label Brent and re-released in August 1962 as "(There's a) Devil in His Heart", the B-side of "Bad Boy". This pairing also appeared in the United Kingdom on the Oriole label in 1962. The record was not a hit on either side of the Atlantic. The Donays only made one recording but their lead singer, Yvonne Vernee (real name Yvonne Symington) also recorded solo, and later joined the Elgins at Motown.

== The Beatles' version ==
"Devil in Her Heart"
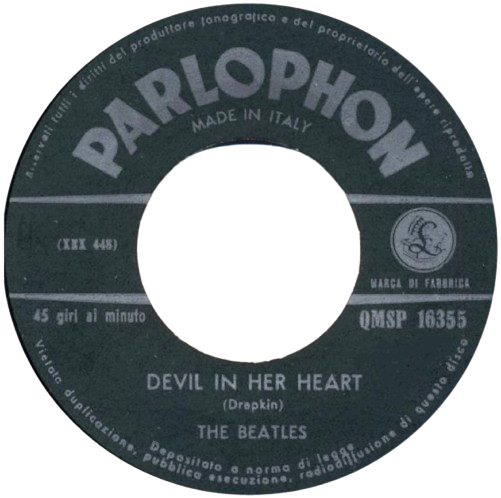
- B-side label from the 1964 Italian single, with "From Me to You" as the A-side

Song by the Beatles

from the album With the Beatles
- Released: 22 November 1963
- Recorded: 18 July 1963
- Studio: EMI, London
- Genre: Pop rock
- Length: 2:27
- Label: Parlophone
- Songwriter: Richard D. Drapkin
- Producer: George Martin

"Devil in Her Heart" is a renamed cover version of the song performed by English rock band the Beatles with George Harrison on lead vocals. It was issued on their second UK album, With the Beatles, released in November 1963. The recording was completed in three takes, plus overdubs. Writing credits were given to Richard D. Drapkin for the cover; it was recorded at EMI (now called Abbey Road Studios) in Central London in July 1963.

=== Personnel ===
- George Harrison – double-tracked vocal, lead guitar
- John Lennon – backing vocal, rhythm guitar
- Paul McCartney – backing vocal, bass
- Ringo Starr – drums, maracas
- George Martin – producer
- Norman Smith – engineer

Personnel per Ian MacDonald

A BBC recording of the song was issued in 1995 as a B-side to "Baby It's You".

When Mojo released a reworking of With the Beatles in 2013, the track was covered by Trevor Moss and Hannah-Lou of bluegrass band Indigo Moss.
