= Not a Second Time =

"Not A Second Time"
- Cover of the song's sheet music

Song by the Beatles

from the album With the Beatles
- Released: 22 November 1963
- Recorded: 11 September 1963
- Studio: EMI, London
- Genre: Rock
- Length: 2:08
- Label: Parlophone
- Songwriter: Lennon–McCartney
- Producer: George Martin

"Not a Second Time" is a song by English rock band the Beatles. It was written by John Lennon, though credited to the Lennon–McCartney partnership. It was first released on the Beatles' second British album, With the Beatles, and their second American album Meet the Beatles!. Lennon said he was "trying to write a Smokey Robinson or something at the time." The song was recorded in nine takes on 11 September 1963 at EMI Studios.

== Musical structure ==
This song inspired a musical analysis from William Mann of The Times, citing the "Aeolian cadence" (Aeolian harmony) of Lennon's vocals as the song draws to a close, and noting (although incorrectly) that the same chord progression appears at the end of the final movement of Gustav Mahler's Das Lied von der Erde. Lennon, years later, remarked: "To this day, I have no idea what [Aeolian cadences] are. They sound like exotic birds." The actual meaning of the term "Aeolian cadence" is that a major key song resolves on the vi chord, which is the tonic chord of the relative minor key (the Mahler ends on the major tonic with an "added 6th," not on a vi chord.) The term derives from the fact that the Aeolian mode is rooted on the sixth step of the major scale.

Dominic Pedler considers the "Aeolian cadence" moment to occur at the end of this line: (Am) "You hurt me then. You're back again. No/(Bm) no no/(D7) not a second time"/(Em). Pedler writes: "We are expecting the D7 chord, the dominant in the key of G, to return to the G major tonic". However, in replacing it with an Em chord supporting an isolated E note on "time", we have an interrupted cadence or dominant-to-relative sub-minor (V7 to vi) shift. The major key of the song is G, but it appears to resolve on the Em (vi) chord. As Allan Moore puts it, "Mann would argue that it is not the same thing as a 'V-vi' Interrupted or Deceptive cadence because—at that precise point in the song—the role of the E minor as a 'vi' is being questioned and is veering towards tonic status."

Pedler also claims that another interesting moment in the song is that George Martin's piano part alternates not between G and E minor, but G and E major, the presence of the piano's extra G# (the major 3rd of the E chord) creating a "grating, tense colouring" in comparison to a G natural of the guitar's Em chord. Examination of a digitally extracted piano part reveals, however, that Martin plays open 5ths (chords with no 3rds, either minor or major). Pedler's discussion with musical experts about the comparison between this Beatles song and Mahler's "Song of the Earth" revealed that none found anything relevant, except perhaps that Mahler's Farewell movement involves various shades of a C major chord and ends after a flute B-A drop (the A chord being a 6th in the chord of C) with the "final sonority" of a C6 (where the C, E and G notes are from the trombones and lower strings and the A from oboe and flute, this final C6 chord seeming to be "printed on the atmosphere", as Benjamin Britten terms it).

== Personnel ==
- John Lennon – double-tracked vocal, acoustic guitar
- Paul McCartney – bass
- George Harrison – acoustic guitar
- Ringo Starr – drums
- George Martin – producer, piano
- Norman Smith – engineer

Personnel per Ian MacDonald

== Cover versions ==
- R. Stevie Moore covered the song in 1978 on his album The North.
- Robert Palmer covered the song on his 1980 album Clues, adding a second verse featuring new lyrics not in the Beatles version. It was released as a single in 1981 and, although it did not enter the UK Singles Chart, reached number 79 on the Record Business Singles Top 100 chart.
- The Pretenders covered the song in 1990 as a bonus track on the Sense of Purpose single.
- The Smithereens on their 2007 album Meet The Smithereens!.
- Rosanne Cash included the song on some international versions of her 1979 Columbia debut Right or Wrong.
