= Little Child =

- Cover of the song's sheet music

Song by the Beatles

from the album With the Beatles
- Released: 22 November 1963 (mono); 30 November 1963 (stereo)
- Recorded: 11–12 September and 3 October 1963
- Studio: EMI, London
- Genre: Rock and roll
- Length: 1:48
- Label: Parlophone
- Songwriter: Lennon–McCartney
- Producer: George Martin

"Little Child" is a song by the English rock band the Beatles from their 1963 UK album With the Beatles. It was written by John Lennon and Paul McCartney for Ringo Starr, but Starr was instead given "I Wanna Be Your Man" as his album song.

== Background ==
McCartney describes "Little Child" as being a "work song" or an "album filler". He admits to taking the melody of the line "I'm so sad and lonely" from the song "Whistle My Love" by British balladeer and actor Elton Hayes. The phrase "sad and lonely" also appears in the Lennon-McCartney number "Bad to Me", originally recorded by Billy J. Kramer and the Dakotas, as well as "Act Naturally", which the Beatles covered (with Starr singing) for the album Help!.

== Recording ==
The song was recorded in three different sessions, with the first on 11 September 1963, where the Beatles recorded two takes. They later returned to it the next day, recording 16 takes, including overdubs of piano from McCartney and harmonica from Lennon, which he plays non-stop throughout the song. They later returned to it on 3 October, when they recorded three more takes. In the stereo mix, the harmonica pans from left to right for the solo, then pans back from right to left after the solo. The song's solo follows a "twelve-bar blues format that does not appear in the rest of the [song]."

== Reception ==
Music critic Richie Unterberger of AllMusic said of the song: "It might have been one of the less sophisticated and impressive tracks on the record, but it was still pretty good", and "'Little Child' might not be a work of genius, but it's sheer rock 'n' roll fun".

== Personnel ==
- John Lennon – vocal, rhythm guitar, harmonica
- Paul McCartney – vocal, piano, bass
- George Harrison – lead guitar
- Ringo Starr – drums, additional drums

Personnel per Ian MacDonald

According to MacDonald, the vocals were "credited to Lennon and McCartney, but more [likely] the former double-tracked."

== Cover versions ==
Wreckless Eric covered the song with James Nicholls for Mojo magazine's CD We're With the Beatles in 2013. The song was also covered by the fictional band Snow Pink on an episode of the television series CHiPs, titled "Battle of the Bands" (1982).
