= The Beatles' Story =

Recording by the Beatles
- Released: 23 November 1964
- Venues: Hollywood Bowl, Los Angeles
- Studio: Capitol Records Building
- Genres: Documentary, interview
- Length: 49:22
- Label: Capitol
- Producers: Gary Usher, Roger Christian

The Beatles North American chronology
Hear the Beatles Tell All (1964)	The Beatles' Story (1964)	Beatles '65 (1964)

The Beatles' Story is the sixth album by the English rock band the Beatles in the United States, issued on 23 November 1964 by Capitol Records. It is a documentary double album featuring interviews, press conferences, and snippets of original or orchestral versions of Beatles songs, with voice-over narration. The album's original liner notes described it as a "narrative and musical biography" of Beatlemania. It was produced by Los Angeles–based songwriter and producer Gary Usher and disc jockey and lyricist Roger Christian, and narrated by John Babcock, Al Wiman and Christian.

Capitol issued the album in response to the Vee-Jay Records LP Hear the Beatles Tell All, a compilation of radio interviews with the band carried out by Los Angeles disc jockeys. The company also sought to compete with unauthorised Beatles interview records issued by the Radio Pulse Beat label, which released three such LPs hosted by Ed Rudy. The Beatles' Story peaked at number 7 on the Billboard Top LPs chart and was certified gold by the Recording Industry Association of America. In 2014, Capitol reissued the album as part of the Beatles' The U.S. Albums box set.

== Development ==
Originally, Capitol Records intended to create an album from the group's show at the Hollywood Bowl, which took place on 23 August 1964. A recording was made of the concert, but the Beatles and their producer, George Martin, deemed it of insufficient quality due to the poor sound and the volume of the fans' screaming. The Beatles' Story nevertheless contains a 48-second excerpt of "Twist and Shout" from the Hollywood Bowl performance. It was the first record to include a recording of the Beatles in concert.

Using audio from interviews and press conferences, interspersed with music, The Beatles Story was produced by Gary Usher and Roger Christian. Among the segments were items devoted to each of the four Beatles – John Lennon, Paul McCartney, George Harrison and Ringo Starr – and others on their manager, Brian Epstein, and Martin. The Hollyridge Strings performed the easy listening versions of the Beatles' songs heard on the album. The voice-over commentary was written and narrated by John Babcock and, on behalf of radio station KFWB of Hollywood, Al Wiman and Christian.

== Release and reception ==
Professional ratings
Review scores
Source	Rating
AllMusic	2/5 stars
The Rolling Stone Record Guide	2/5 stars

Capitol released The Beatles' Story in the US on 23 November 1964, on the same day as the band's "I Feel Fine" single. The front cover of the LP contained individual photos of the band members, taken by photographer Joe Covello, above a Union Jack. The album spent 17 weeks on the Billboard Top LPs chart. It peaked at number 7 on 2 January 1965 and remained in that position for three further weeks while the band's new studio album, Beatles '65, was number 1. The Beatles' Story was certified a gold record by the RIAA on 31 December 1964. It was the Beatles' fifth Capitol album, all of which had been released within a year of the band's commercial breakthrough in the US. Author Barry Miles comments that the documentary record was "blatantly exploitative" but this was insufficient to deter American fans.

The album was also issued in Canada. It was released by Toshiba EMI in Japan on the Apple label (in stereo) in a box set with a deluxe 24-page 12"x12" booklet that contains the entire text of the script in English and Japanese. The album was being prepared for release on digital audio tape in 1996, but when the format failed commercially the plan was scrapped.

In 2014, The Beatles' Story was made available on CD for the first time as part of the Beatles' box set The U.S. Albums. Stephen Thomas Erlewine of AllMusic describes it as "a tedious neo-documentary record" and "cornball show biz, with radio announcers delivering a spit-shined script designed to bridge segments between canned interviews". In his review for the Toronto Sun, Darryl Sterdan said The Beatles' Story was a "cash-grab" by the record company and a "50-minute mish-mash ... dashed off for early Christmas shoppers". He added: "Amazingly, it went gold. This one is also new on CD. Really, they needn't have bothered."

== Track listing ==
Side one
No.	Title	Length
1.	"On Stage with the Beatles"	1:03
2.	"How Beatlemania Began"	1:20
3.	"Beatlemania in Action"	1:25
4.	"Man Behind the Beatles – Brian Epstein"	2:47
5.	"John Lennon"	5:50
6.	"Who's a Millionaire?"	0:39
Total length:		13:04

Side two
No.	Title	Length
1.	"Beatles Will Be Beatles"	7:28
2.	"Man Behind the Music – George Martin"	1:04
3.	"George Harrison"	4:46
Total length:		13:18

Side three
No.	Title	Length
1.	"A Hard Day's Night – Their First Movie"	3:08
2.	"Paul McCartney"	2:45
3.	"Sneaky Haircuts and More About Paul"	3:29
Total length:		9:22

Side four
No.	Title	Length
1.	"The Beatles Look at Life"	2:05
2.	"'Victims' of Beatlemania"	1:10
3.	"Beatle Medley"	3:58
4.	"Ringo Starr"	6:24
5.	"Liverpool and All the World!"	1:05
Total length:		14:42

=== Songs ===
Portions of the following songs appear on the album:

- "I Want to Hold Your Hand"
- "Slow Down"
- "This Boy"
- "You Can't Do That"
- "Can't Buy Me Love"
- "If I Fell"
- "And I Love Her"
- "A Hard Day's Night"
- "Twist and Shout" (live)
- "Things We Said Today"
- "I'm Happy Just to Dance with You"
- "Little Child"
- "Long Tall Sally"
- "She Loves You"
- "Boys"

== Charts and certifications ==
=== Chart performance ===
Chart (1964)	Peak position
US Billboard Top LPs	7

=== Certifications ===
Region	Certification	Certified units/sales
United States (RIAA)	Gold	500,000^{^}
^{^} Shipments figures based on certification alone.

== See also ==
- Outline of the Beatles
- The Beatles timeline

== Sources ==
- Castleman, Harry; Podrazik, Walter J. (1976). All Together Now: The First Complete Beatles Discography 1961–1975. New York, NY: Ballantine Books. ISBN 0-345-25680-8.
- Gaar, Gillian G. (2013). 100 Things Beatles Fans Should Know & Do Before They Die. Chicago, IL: Triumph Books. ISBN 978-1-60078-799-7.
- Marsh, Dave; Swenson, John, eds. (1983). The New Rolling Stone Record Guide. New York, NY: Random House/Rolling Stone Press. ISBN 0-394-72107-1.
- Miles, Barry (2001). The Beatles Diary Volume 1: The Beatles Years. London: Omnibus Press. ISBN 0-7119-8308-9.
- Schaffner, Nicholas (1978). The Beatles Forever. New York, NY: McGraw-Hill. ISBN 0-07-055087-5.
- Whitburn, Joel (2010). Joel Whitburn Presents Top Pop Albums, Seventh Edition. Record Research Inc. ISBN 978-0-89820-183-3.
- Womack, Kenneth (2014). The Beatles Encyclopedia: Everything Fab Four. Santa Barbara, CA: ABC-CLIO. ISBN 978-0-313-39171-2.
