= The Beatles' North American releases =

Album releases by the Beatles in North America

The Beatles experienced huge popularity on the British record charts in early 1963, but record companies in the United States did not immediately follow up with releases of their own, and the Beatles' commercial success in the US continued to be hampered by other obstacles, including issues with royalties and public derision toward the "Beatle haircut".

It was nearly a year before the Beatles became widely popular in the US. CBS Evening News aired a five-minute news story about Beatlemania in the UK on 10 December 1963; this led to a teenage girl making an airplay request of a local radio station, which in turn sparked a sequence of events leading to the rush-release of the single "I Want to Hold Your Hand" and the group's commercial breakthrough.

In the United States, Capitol Records modified the Beatles' albums from their original configurations, altering track listings and artwork. This was done because albums released in the US contained fewer tracks, typically no more than 11 or 12, due to differences in how publishing royalties were calculated in the two countries. Also, in the American market it was expected for albums to include the current hit single, whereas British albums typically did not duplicate songs released as singles. This resulted in 11 albums being released by Capitol from 1964 to 1966, culled from seven UK albums and various singles. This trend continued until 1967, when the Beatles signed a new recording contract with EMI.

The Beatles were dissatisfied with how Capitol and other companies around the world were issuing their work in almost unrecognizable forms, so they gained full approval rights beginning in 1967 concerning album titles and cover art, track listing and running order in the United States; their albums were released unmodified starting with Sgt. Pepper's Lonely Hearts Club Band. Capitol stopped the production of the US versions in the late 1980s, and the original UK LPs were released in the US beginning in 1987.

== Initial obstacles ==
EMI offered US distribution of the Beatles' records to their American subsidiary Capitol Records in 1962. Capitol declined, so EMI made a five-year agreement with Vee-Jay Records, an independent label based in Chicago; this was part of a deal for the rights to EMI artist Frank Ifield. The first Beatles single released by Vee-Jay was "Please Please Me" in February 1963. Art Roberts, music director of Chicago radio station WLS, placed "Please Please Me" into radio rotation in late February, and Dick Biondi was the first to play the record on his show. "Please Please Me" reached number 35 on WLS's weekly survey but failed to chart nationally. Vee-Jay released "From Me to You" in May 1963 which reached number 33 at radio station KRLA in Los Angeles, where Biondi was now working. The single only made it to number 116 on the Billboard Hot 100. EMI cancelled Vee-Jay's rights to the Beatles in August because of non-payment of royalties. (Note: Vee-Jay subsequently re-released the Beatles recordings that it claimed to control in early 1964 following a settlement with Capitol Records, and Capitol granted them a license to release the disputed material until October 1964.)

EMI offered Capitol the next Beatles single "She Loves You" but Capitol again declined, so EMI licensed it to Philadelphia-based Swan Records who released it in September 1963. "She Loves You" also failed to receive airplay, and an airing of the song on Dick Clark's TV show American Bandstand produced laughter from American teenagers when they saw the group's distinctive hairstyles. In early November 1963, Brian Epstein persuaded Ed Sullivan to present the Beatles on three editions of his show in February, and parlayed this into a record deal with Capitol. Capitol committed to a mid-January release of "I Want to Hold Your Hand". CBS Evening News aired a five-minute news story on December 10, 1963, about the phenomenon of Beatlemania in Britain. The segment first aired on the CBS Morning News on 22 November and had originally been scheduled to be repeated on that day's Evening News, but regular programming was cancelled following the assassination of President John F. Kennedy.

== Impact of "I Want to Hold Your Hand" ==
The CBS Evening News segment inspired a teenage girl named Marsha Albert in Silver Spring, Maryland to write to Carroll James, a disc jockey at Washington DC's WWDC radio station, requesting that he play records by the Beatles. James had seen the same news story and arranged to have a copy sent to him of the single "I Want to Hold Your Hand". He debuted the record on 17 December, and the station received overwhelming positive audience reaction and immediately escalated its airplay. Capitol Records president Alan W. Livingston learned of the overwhelming listener response a few days later and decided to rush the single's release three weeks ahead of schedule on 26 December 1963.

Several New York radio stations began playing "I Want to Hold Your Hand" on its release day. The positive response that had started in Washington was duplicated in New York and quickly spread to other markets. The record sold one million copies in just ten days, and Cashbox magazine had certified the record number one for the week ending 25 January, after just three weeks in their Top 100 chart.

It was around this time that Brian Epstein was besieged by merchandising offers and chose to effectively give it away, underestimating this relatively new market within the pop industry. Nicky Byrne set up Seltaeb in 1963 exclusively to look after the Beatles merchandising rights on a 90/10 basis in his own favour. This quickly led to contractual disputes and lawsuits which eventually cost Epstein’s Liverpool record store, NEMS, an estimated $100 million in licensing fees.

== Impact of the Beatles' arrival in the United States ==
After the Beatles' success in 1964, Vee-Jay Records and Swan Records took advantage of their previously secured rights to the group's early recordings and reissued the songs, and all the songs reached the top ten. Three singles released by Capitol Records of Canada were imported into the United States and sold enough to make the American charts. "Love Me Do" was then issued by Vee-Jay on the Tollie Records label and made it to number one. MGM Records and Atco Records also secured rights to the Beatles' early Tony Sheridan-era recordings and had minor hits with "My Bonnie" and "Ain't She Sweet".

These record releases led to a new dimension of chart success for the Beatles, and they held the top five positions on the Billboard magazine Hot 100 chart and the Cashbox magazine Top 100 chart for April 1964. A record 14 Beatle records were on the Billboard Hot 100 chart the following week.

Vee-Jay issued Introducing... the Beatles in 1964 which was essentially their debut British album with some minor alterations. Vee-Jay also issued an unusual LP called The Beatles Vs The Four Seasons. This two-LP set paired Introducing... The Beatles and The Golden Hits Of The Four Seasons, another successful act that Vee-Jay had under contract, in the guise of a contest, with the back cover featuring a score card. Another unusual release was the Hear the Beatles Tell All album, which consisted of two lengthy interviews with Los Angeles radio disc jockeys; side one was titled "Dave Hull interviews John Lennon", and side two was titled "Jim Steck interviews John, Paul, George, Ringo". No Beatles music was included on this interview album, which turned out to be the only Vee-Jay Beatles album that Capitol Records could not reclaim.

Capitol and Vee-Jay reached a legal settlement giving Vee-Jay the rights to market Beatle recordings that they possessed until 10 October 1964, at which point all rights to all EMI Beatle recordings in the United States were assigned to Capitol Records.

The Vee-Jay/Swan-issued recordings eventually ended up with Capitol, which issued most of the Vee-Jay material on the American-only Capitol release The Early Beatles, with three songs left off this final US version of the album. ("I Saw Her Standing There" was issued as the American B-side of "I Want to Hold Your Hand", and also appeared on the Capitol Records album Meet the Beatles. "Misery" and "There's a Place" were issued as a Capitol "Starline" reissue single in 1964, and reappeared on Capitol's 1980 US version of the Rarities compilation album.) The early Vee-Jay and Swan Beatles records command a high price on the record collectors' market today, and all have been copiously bootlegged. The Swan tracks "She Loves You" and "I'll Get You" were issued on the Capitol LP The Beatles' Second Album. Swan also issued the German-language version of "She Loves You", called "Sie Liebt Dich". This song later appeared (in stereo) on Capitol's Rarities album.

== List of North American album releases ==
This is a list of albums released in North America whilst the band were still active. Albums starting with The Beatles (1968) were released worldwide on Apple Records.

| Year | Title | Label |
|---|---|---|
| 1963 | Beatlemania! With the Beatles | Capitol Canada |
| 1964 | Introducing... The Beatles | Vee-Jay |
| 1964 | Meet the Beatles! | Capitol |
| 1964 | The Beatles with Tony Sheridan and Their Guests | MGM |
| 1964 | Twist and Shout | Capitol Canada |
| 1964 | The Beatles' Second Album | Capitol |
| 1964 | The Beatles' Long Tall Sally | Capitol Canada |
| 1964 | A Hard Day's Night | United Artists |
| 1964 | Something New | Capitol |
| 1964 | Hear the Beatles Tell All (Interview album) | Vee-Jay |
| 1964 | Ain't She Sweet | Atco |
| 1964 | The Beatles vs. The Four Seasons | Vee-Jay |
| 1964 | Songs, Pictures and Stories of the Fabulous Beatles | Vee-Jay |
| 1964 | The Beatles' Story | Capitol |
| 1964 | Beatles '65 | Capitol |
| 1965 | The Early Beatles | Capitol |
| 1965 | Beatles VI | Capitol |
| 1965 | Help! | Capitol |
| 1965 | Rubber Soul | Capitol |
| 1966 | Yesterday and Today | Capitol |
| 1966 | Revolver | Capitol |
| 1967 | Sgt. Pepper's Lonely Hearts Club Band | Capitol |
| 1967 | Magical Mystery Tour | Capitol |
| 1968 | The Beatles | Apple |
| 1969 | Yellow Submarine | Apple |
| 1969 | Abbey Road | Apple |
| 1970 | Hey Jude | Apple |
| 1970 | In the Beginning (Circa 1960) | Polydor |
| 1970 | Let It Be | Apple |

== See also ==
- Outline of the Beatles
- The Beatles timeline

== Sources ==
- Spitz, Bob (2005). The Beatles: The Biography. Little Brown. ISBN 0-316-80352-9.
