= Use Your Head =

Single by Mary Wells

from the album Mary Wells
- B-side: "Everlovin' Boy"
- Released: 1964
- Recorded: 1964
- Genre: Soul/pop
- Length: 2:08
- Label: 20th Century Fox; 555
- Songwriter(s): Barrett Strong; Chuck Barksdale; Wade Flemons
- Producer(s): Andre Williams; Riley Hampton

Mary Wells singles chronology
"Ain't It the Truth" (1964)	"Use Your Head" (1964)	"Stop Taking Me for Granted" (1964)

"Use Your Head" is a soulful pop song written by Barrett Strong, Wade Flemons and The Dells' Chuck Barksdale and released as a single by former Motown singer Mary Wells on the 20th Century Fox label.

== Overview ==
=== Song information ===
The single showcases the narrator telling her lover to think before he made some costly decisions based on advice given to him by one of his best friends warning her lover to "use his head" before he ends up "losing the best love he ever had".

=== Release and reaction ===
The song was one of the few successful post-Motown singles Wells recorded. The song registered at number 34 on the Billboard Hot 100 and number 13 on the R&B singles chart.

== Personnel ==
- Lead vocal by Mary Wells
- Background vocals by assorted singers
- Instrumentation by assorted musicians
