= Hear the Beatles Tell All =

1964 interview album by the Beatles

Recording by the Beatles
- Released: November 1964
- Genre: Interview
- Length: 26:18
- Label: Vee-Jay
- Producer: Lou Adler (from Dunhill Records)

The Beatles North American chronology
Something New (1964)	Hear the Beatles Tell All (1964)	The Beatles' Story (1964)

Hear the Beatles Tell All (subtitled Live in Person Interviews Recorded During Their Latest American Tour) is an album released in the United States by Vee-Jay Records in November 1964. One side of the album contains an interview with all four members of the Beatles by Dave Hull, and the other side contains an interview with John Lennon by Jim Steck. It became the only album on which Capitol Records could not dispute Vee Jay Records' publishing rights.

It was originally published as a promotional edition during the Beatles' tour of the United States between August and September 1964. Later, it was officially released in November of that year.

== Origin ==
Jim Steck and Dave Hull, of the Los Angeles radio station KRLA 1110, interviewed the Beatles during their 1964 American tour. After KRLA broadcast the interviews, Vee-Jay reached an agreement with those responsible to edit them into an album. To make the record cohesive, Vee-jay enlisted the services of Lou Adler, the co-founder of Dunhill Records and chief recording producer there between 1964 and 1967. Adler applied screaming and various noises from live audiences to the recordings, as well as percussion by session drummer Hal Blaine.

== Contents ==
=== Side 1 ===
Steck interviewed John Lennon in Los Angeles on August 24, 1964. Lennon talked about:

- the audience at the Hollywood Bowl (the Beatles had performed there the day before)
- commercial radio
- the origin of the name "The Beatles"
- long hair
- skiffle music / band line-up
- future plans
- educational teaching received and its academic failures
- their home in Liverpool

=== Side 2 ===
The members of the Beatles were interviewed by Hull, known to the group thereafter as "the man who made our home addresses public". Interviews were conducted on August 25, 1964. They discussed:

- Paul McCartney: Jane Asher and her family
- Lennon: his wife having a baby
- George Harrison: his mother answering fan letters / Pattie Boyd
- McCartney: making known the address of the domiciles of the group members
- Lennon: A Hard Day's Night / New house in Surrey
- Ringo Starr: his throat operation
- McCartney: his father's racehorse, called "Drake's Drum"
- Starr: Maureen / Disneyland
- Harrison: Disneyland

When each of the group members was asked which part of the movie A Hard Day's Night was their favorite, they all replied, "The scene where they jump and run in the open field to the sound of 'Can't Buy Me Love'".
