= Mary Wells (album) =

Studio album by Mary Wells
- Released: March 19, 1965
- Recorded: 1964–1965
- Genre: Soul, R&B
- Label: 20th Century Fox
- Producer: Andre Williams; Robert Bateman on "Ain't It the Truth"

Mary Wells chronology
Mary Wells Sings My Guy (1964)	Mary Wells (1965)	Love Songs to the Beatles (1965)

Singles from Mary Wells
- 1. "Use Your Head" Released: 1964

Mary Wells is the self-titled sixth studio album released by Mary Wells. The album was her first album with 20th Century Fox, a year after she left her old label, Motown, the label that she had produced its first hits with. While this album was boosted by the top 40 success of the Motown-esque "Use Your Head", the album received little notice and its following singles including the top 50 hit, "Ain't It the Truth?" and "Stop Taking Me for Granted", which peaked at a dismal number 88 pop, performed poorer for an artist who a year ago had scored her first No. 1 hit with "My Guy". This and Love Songs to the Beatles were the only albums she released with 20th Century Fox.

Riley Hampton was the uncredited arranger, with Norman Schwartz responsible for cover design.

== Track listing ==
=== Side one ===
1. "Why Don't You Let Yourself Go" (Rudy Clark)
2. "Everlovin' Boy" (Rudy Clark)
3. "He's a Lover" (Lee Porter, Ronald Miller)
4. "Stop Takin' Me For Granted" (Jennie Lee Lambert, Mickey Gentile)
5. "Use Your Head" (Barrett Strong, Chuck Barksdale, Richard Parker)
6. "We're Just Two of a Kind" (Van McCoy)

=== Side two ===
1. "My Mind's Made Up" (J. J. Jackson, Sidney Barnes)
2. "Never, Never Leave Me" (Jennie Lee Lambert, Mickey Gentile)
3. "Ain't It the Truth" (Lou Courtney a/k/a L. R. Peques)
4. "He's Good Enough for Me" (Bob Goodman)
5. "How Can I Forget Him" (Bob Feldman, Jerry Goldstein, Lou Courtney a/k/a L. R. Peques, Richard Gottehrer)
6. "I'm Learning"
