= Twist and Shout (album) =

Album by the Beatles, released in Canada

Studio album by the Beatles
- Released: 3 February 1964
- Recorded: 4 September 1962 – 1 July 1963
- Studios: EMI, London
- Genre: Merseybeat
- Length: 32:11
- Label: Capitol Canada
- Producer: George Martin

The Beatles North American chronology
Meet the Beatles! (1964)	Twist and Shout (1964)	The Beatles' Second Album (1964)

The Beatles Canadian chronology
Beatlemania! With the Beatles (1963)	Twist and Shout (1964)	The Beatles' Long Tall Sally (1964)

Singles from Twist and Shout
- 1. "Twist and Shout" Released: 16 March 1964; 2. "Do You Want to Know a Secret" Released: 26 May 1964

Twist and Shout is the Beatles' second album released in Canada, in mono by Capitol Records (catalogue number T-6054) on 3 February 1964. It consists of songs mostly drawn from Please Please Me, their first LP released in the United Kingdom. This album, like its parent album, contains both original Beatles songs, as well as covers (including its namesake, "Twist and Shout"), denoted in the track listing.

== Track listing ==
Side one
No.	Title	Writer(s)	Lead vocals	Length
1.	"Anna (Go to Him)"	Arthur Alexander	John Lennon	3:00
2.	"Chains"	Gerry Goffin, Carole King	George Harrison	2:25
3.	"Boys"	Luther Dixon, Wes Farrell	Ringo Starr	2:28
4.	"Ask Me Why"	McCartney/Lennon	Lennon	2:28
5.	"Please Please Me"	McCartney/Lennon	Lennon and McCartney	2:00
6.	"Love Me Do"	Lennon/McCartney	McCartney and Lennon	2:22
7.	"From Me to You"	McCartney/Lennon	Lennon and McCartney	1:56
Total length:				16:39

Side two
No.	Title	Writer(s)	Lead vocals	Length
1.	"P.S. I Love You"	McCartney/Lennon	Paul McCartney	2:06
2.	"Baby It's You"	Burt Bacharach, Mack David, Barney Williams	Lennon	2:40
3.	"Do You Want to Know a Secret"	McCartney/Lennon	Harrison	1:59
4.	"A Taste of Honey"	Ric Marlow, Bobby Scott	McCartney	2:05
5.	"There's a Place"	McCartney/Lennon	Lennon and McCartney	1:53
6.	"Twist and Shout"	Phil Medley, Bert Russell	Lennon	2:33
7.	"She Loves You"	McCartney/Lennon	Lennon and McCartney	2:19
Total length:				15:35

== Differences from Please Please Me ==
- "I Saw Her Standing There" (the opening track of Please Please Me) and "Misery" were omitted from Twist and Shout. They both appear on the next Canadian LP release, The Beatles' Long Tall Sally.
- "From Me to You" and "She Loves You" were added to Twist and Shout. They were issued as the A-sides of singles in the UK.
- The two albums' front and back covers differ significantly.

== Reissues ==
Twist and Shout received miscellaneous reissues since the initial release date. The initial release was exclusively mono audio, because stereo record players were not popular in Canada at the time of release and therefore not profitable. Early copies of the record were manufactured with a limited edition 8x10 inch poster of the Beatles. The subsequent reissues attributed Parr's, the printer commissioned by Capitol to create the cardboard record jackets as well as other minor variations in the label, font size, and catalogue numbers. Twist and Shout was eventually reissued in stereo in the 1970s, bearing catalogue number ST-6054 to denote stereo audio; all tracks were in stereo except for "Love Me Do", "P.S. I Love You", and "She Loves You", which remained mono. The stereo reissue is considered to be the definitive version.

== Certifications ==
Region	Certification	Certified units/sales
Canada (Music Canada)	3× Platinum	300,000^{^}
^{^} Shipments figures based on certification alone.

== See also ==
- Outline of the Beatles
- The Beatles timeline
