= The Beatles' Long Tall Sally =

Studio album by the Beatles
- Released: 11 May 1964
- Recorded: 1964
- Studio: EMI, London
- Genre: Rock and roll; beat; R&B
- Length: 28:54
- Label: Capitol Canada
- Producer: George Martin

The Beatles North American chronology
The Beatles' Second Album (1964)	The Beatles' Long Tall Sally (1964)	A Hard Day's Night (1964)

The Beatles Canadian chronology
Twist and Shout (1964)	The Beatles' Long Tall Sally (1964)	A Hard Day's Night (1964)

The Beatles' Long Tall Sally is an album by the English rock band the Beatles, their final album to be released exclusively in Canada. It was a mono release on the Capitol Records label (catalogue number T 6063) in May 1964. It was #1 for 5 non-consecutive weeks on the CHUM Charts starting May 11, 1964.

After the release of this album, Beatles' records in Canada would match the group's United States releases, starting with the United Artists version of the A Hard Day's Night album, and, on Capitol, Something New. This was done under orders from Capitol president Alan W. Livingston. Earlier American Beatle album releases were also issued in Canada.

This album borrows its name—and two tracks—from the Beatles' British EP Long Tall Sally. Four of the tracks had already been released on the Canadian album Beatlemania! With the Beatles.

The cover design is almost identical to the US release The Beatles' Second Album.

== Track listing ==
All songs written by Lennon–McCartney, except where noted.

Side one

1. "I Want to Hold Your Hand" – 2:24
2. "I Saw Her Standing There" – 2:50
3. "You Really Got a Hold on Me" (Smokey Robinson) – 3:00
4. "Devil in Her Heart" (Richard P. Drapkin) – 2:28
5. "Roll Over Beethoven" (Chuck Berry) – 2:46
6. "Misery" – 1:48

Side two

1. "Long Tall Sally" (Enotris Johnson, Richard Penniman, Robert Blackwell) – 2:03
2. "I Call Your Name" – 2:10
3. "Please Mr. Postman" (Robert Bateman, Georgia Dobbins, William Garrett, Fred Gorman, Brian Holland) – 2:37
4. "This Boy" – 2:10
5. "I'll Get You" – 2:04
6. "You Can't Do That" – 2:34

== Certifications ==
Region	Certification	Certified units/sales
Canada (Music Canada)	Gold	50,000^{^}
^{^} Shipments figures based on certification alone.

== Reissue ==
The album was deleted in 1967 but was reissued in 1971 along with the two other unique Canadian Beatles albums in Capitol's "6000 Series". The album was issued in stereo for the first time in 1976, though nearly all the "stereo" tracks are in the "reprocessed for stereo" format. This process involves creating a "dual mono/simulated stereo" sound by emphasizing the higher frequencies on the right channel and lower frequency on the left.

== See also ==
- Outline of the Beatles
- The Beatles timeline
