= Al Wiman =

American reporter

Al Wiman is an American reporter. He has worked at KSDK-TV and KMOV-TV in Saint Louis, Missouri. He also has served with radio and television stations in Los Angeles and Tallahassee, Florida. Wiman's career honors and awards include three Emmy Awards from the National Academy of Television Arts and Sciences and two Golden Globe awards from the Southern California Radio/TV News Association.

Wiman is perhaps best known for his reports on the Charles Manson murders. Wiman and his television crew discovered the bloody clothes discarded by the killers on a hillside in Beverly Hills. As a result, Wiman was referenced in Helter Skelter and was portrayed in the television film based on the case.

While working at radio station KFWB in Hollywood, Wiman co-narrated The Beatles' Story, a documentary album about the Beatlemania phenomenon. It was released by Capitol Records on November 23, 1964.

== Sources ==
- Christopher Campbell (January 23, 2003). "Former TV reporter joins Webster University as communications head". The Journal, The News Source for Webster University. Archived from the original on 2009-05-03.
