= Love Songs to the Beatles =

Studio album by Mary Wells
- Released: October 23, 1965
- Recorded: 1965
- Genre: Soul, pop
- Label: 20th Century Fox
- Producer: Bernie Wayne

Mary Wells chronology
| Mary Wells (1965) | Love Songs to the Beatles (1965) | The Two Sides of Mary Wells (1966) |

Professional ratings
Review scores
| Source | Rating |
|---|---|
| Record Mirror | 3/5 stars |

Love Songs to the Beatles is a tribute album dedicated to the Beatles, released in 1965 by Mary Wells on the 20th Century Fox label. The album was a personal tribute to the British rock group by Wells, who was one of the first Motown artists to tour overseas as the group's opening act after her single "My Guy" had gained hit status in the UK. Wells befriended all four members of the group and released it as a labor of love. This was her second and last album for 20th Century Fox.

== Track listing ==
All tracks composed by John Lennon and Paul McCartney

1. "He Loves You"
2. "All My Lovin'"
3. "Please Please Me"
4. "Do You Want to Know a Secret"
5. "Can't Buy Me Love"
6. "I Should Have Known Better"
7. "Help!"
8. "Eight Days a Week"
9. "And I Love Him"
10. "Ticket to Ride"
11. "Yesterday"
12. "I Saw Him Standing There"

== Personnel ==
- Arranged and conducted by Joe Mazzu
- Jack Lonshein – cover design
