= The Beatles' Second Album =

Studio album by the Beatles
- Released: 10 April 1964
- Recorded: 5 March 1963 – 1 March 1964
- Studios: EMI, London
- Genres: Rock and roll; R&B
- Length: 26:25
- Label: Capitol
- Producer: George Martin

The Beatles North American chronology
Twist and Shout (1964)	The Beatles' Second Album (1964)	The Beatles' Long Tall Sally (1964)

The Beatles United States chronology
Meet the Beatles! (1964)	The Beatles' Second Album (1964)	A Hard Day's Night (1964)

The Beatles' Second Album is the second Capitol Records album by the English rock band the Beatles, and their third album released in the United States including Introducing... The Beatles, which was issued three months earlier by Vee-Jay Records. Following its release in April 1964, The Beatles' Second Album replaced Meet the Beatles! at number 1 on the Billboard Top LPs chart in the US. The album was compiled mostly from leftover tracks from the UK album With the Beatles and the forthcoming UK Long Tall Sally EP, which are predominantly rock and roll and R&B covers, and rounded out with several Lennon-McCartney-penned non-album b-sides and the hit single "She Loves You". Among critics, it is considered the band's purest rock and roll album and praised for its soulful takes on both contemporary black music hits and original material.

In 2004 The Beatles' Second Album was issued for the first time on compact disc as part of The Capitol Albums, Volume 1 boxed set. It was issued in a miniature cardboard replica of the original album sleeve containing the US mono and stereo mixes. In 2014, the album was released on CD again, individually and included in the Beatles boxed set The U.S. Albums, which contained the album's running order but with UK mixes as remastered in 2009.

An album with the same title and similar cover art but containing different songs from the US release, was issued on the EMI subsidiary label Odeon in 1964 for the Japanese market. The same cover art was used for the album The Beatles' Long Tall Sally issued by Capitol Records of Canada.

== Background and song selection ==
With the massive popularity of Meet the Beatles! through the early part of 1964 and a desire for additional Beatles product, Capitol Records decided to compile a follow-up album as soon as possible. For this, a backlog of some 25 songs, issued by EMI in Britain and many other territories across the world from 1962 onwards, had yet to be issued by Capitol. The Beatles' Second Album was the first album of the group's work to be assembled by the company exclusively for the US market, Meet the Beatles! having been a reconfigured and shorter version of the band's second EMI LP, With the Beatles. Despite its title, however, Second Album was in fact the third Beatles LP in the United States, since Vee-Jay Records had released Introducing... The Beatles in January 1964. Vee-Jay had been able to issue the latter LP – which comprised most of the Beatles' EMI debut, Please Please Me – due to Capitol's initial lack of interest in marketing the Beatles' music.

Second Album was a collection of material from various UK releases and recording sessions dating back to March 1963. Included were the five remaining tracks, all cover versions, from With the Beatles: "Roll Over Beethoven", "You Really Got a Hold on Me", "Devil in Her Heart", "Money (That's What I Want)" and "Please Mr. Postman". Added to these were "Thank You Girl", the B-side to the single "From Me to You"; "She Loves You" and its B-side, "I'll Get You"; "You Can't Do That" (the B-side of "Can't Buy Me Love"), from the upcoming A Hard Day's Night UK soundtrack; and two new recordings, "Long Tall Sally" and "I Call Your Name". The latter tracks would be released in June 1964 in the UK on the Long Tall Sally EP.

== Mixes ==
Capitol's engineers, headed by record executive Dave Dexter, Jr., added considerable echo and reverb to the songs in order to give the album the atmosphere of a live performance. The inclusion of "Thank You Girl" marked the only stereo version of the song released on any album in the US or UK for over 40 years, until another stereo version was released on the 2009 remastered edition of the Past Masters compilation. The same stereo mix of "Thank You Girl" on The Beatles' Second Album was included on The Beatles Beat, released in West Germany and the Netherlands, as well as the original 2004 CD issue of The Beatles Second Album as included in The Capitol Albums, Volume 1 box set. The Capitol album mix of "Thank You Girl" is also unique in that it contains three additional harmonica riffs by John Lennon – two during the bridge and one at the end. For its US album debut, Capitol took this stereo version and transferred it into a two-to-one stereo-to-mono mixdown for the mono LP release, thus creating an alternative mono mix of the song. The stereo version of "Money" also underwent the same two-to-one stereo-to-mono mixdown, creating another alternative mono mix.

For the mono version of "I Call Your Name", the cowbell comes in at the very beginning of the song; the stereo version features the cowbell after the beginning of the vocal. George Harrison's opening 12-string guitar phrase is also different between the mono and stereo versions. On "Long Tall Sally", reverb was added to the stereo version. The dry mono mix of "Long Tall Sally" is different from the mono mix with a slight echo that was issued in the UK, and is unique to the Second Album. The mono version of "You Can't Do That" is also different from the version on the UK A Hard Day's Night LP.

Because "I'll Get You" and "She Loves You" were never mixed in stereo, Duophonic/fake stereo versions were made for this album.

== Release ==
Capitol Records issued The Beatles' Second Album on 10 April 1964 with the catalogue number Capitol ST 2080. The tagline in the advertising for the release read: "It's Here! It's on Capitol!! and It's ALL Beatles!!!" In Canada, this record could not be called The Beatles' Second Album, since Beatlemania! With the Beatles and Twist and Shout had preceded it. A slightly different track listing was released for the Canadian market with similar cover art, under the title The Beatles' Long Tall Sally. In 1968, The Beatles' Second Album, The Early Beatles and Meet the Beatles! were issued in Canada, although the earlier Canadian LPs remained in print (eventually with stereo mixes) until the late 1980s, when all Beatles Capitol LPs were deleted upon the global standardization of the Beatles UK catalog on compact disc.

In the US, the album debuted at number 16 on the Billboard Top LPs for the week ending April 25, 1964. It peaked at number one the following week, replacing Meet the Beatles!, which had held the top spot for eleven weeks (for the last nine of which Vee-Jay's Introducing... had placed at number two). The Beatles' Second Album remained atop the chart for five consecutive weeks and stayed in the top 200 until May 1965. It reached 1,668,435 copies sold by 31 December 1964, and 2,051,486 copies by the end of the decade. It was certified Gold by the RIAA on 13 April 1964, and 2× Platinum on 10 January 1997.

== Critical legacy ==
Retrospective professional reviews
Review scores
Source	Rating
AllMusic	4.5/5 stars
And It Don't Stop	A+
Encyclopedia of Popular Music	3/5 stars
The Rolling Stone Record Guide	5/5 stars

Second Album was one of the first four rock albums purchased by future music critic Robert Christgau. Writing of the album in 1969, he said it disproves the fallacy among new rock scholars and listeners that the Beatles had not succeeded artistically until the more melodic period of Rubber Soul (1965) and Revolver (1966). Instead, he argued it was their ebullient performing style, as on the Second Album's covers of African-American rock and roll songs, which "were touched with soul (compare their Money to the Beach Boys' Barbara Ann) but avoided the sodden seriousness of other white imitators." He included the album in his basic rock "library" of 25 albums for Stereo Review that year, and later in a more comprehensive library of essential 1950s and 1960s recordings for Christgau's Record Guide: Rock Albums of the Seventies (1981). In 2020, Christgau voted for the album in his ballot for Rolling Stone magazine's third edition of the "500 Greatest Albums of All Time".

According to Bruce Eder of AllMusic, The Beatles' Second Album "stands as probably the best pure rock & roll album ever issued of the group's music" because it "avoid[s] any trace of the pop ballads favored by Paul McCartney that usually slowed down the group's other early albums, and the result was the longest uninterrupted body of hard rock & roll and R&B in their entire output." In his 2014 review of the Beatles' Capitol albums, for Guitar World, Jeff Slate commented that "the oomph of the over-compressed Dexter tracks" had since been removed, but the album was arguably their "first great rock and roll record". Referring to the assortment of tracks assembled by Capitol, Darryl Sterdan of the Toronto Sun wrote: "The hodge-podgery begins [here] ... Surprisingly enough, it holds together OK, thanks to a strong string of rockers like Money, Roll Over Beethoven and Long Tall Sally."

== Track listing ==
All songs were written by Lennon–McCartney, except where noted. Composer, track length and lead vocal credits are taken from Beatles scholars Mark Lewisohn, John C. Winn and Ian MacDonald.

Side one
No.	Title	Writer(s)	Lead vocals	Length
1.	"Roll Over Beethoven"	Chuck Berry	Harrison	2:42
2.	"Thank You Girl"		Lennon with McCartney	2:00
3.	"You Really Got a Hold on Me"	Smokey Robinson	Lennon and Harrison	2:58
4.	"Devil in Her Heart"	Richard Drapkin	Harrison	2:23
5.	"Money (That's What I Want)"	Janie Bradford; Berry Gordy, Jr.	Lennon	2:46
6.	"You Can't Do That"		Lennon	2:33
Total length:				15:22

Side two
No.	Title	Writer(s)	Lead vocals	Length
1.	"Long Tall Sally"	Enotris Johnson; Richard Penniman; Robert Blackwell	McCartney	2:01
2.	"I Call Your Name"		Lennon	2:10
3.	"Please Mr. Postman"	Brian Holland; Robert Bateman; William Garrett; Georgia Dobbins; Fred Gorman	Lennon	2:32
4.	"I'll Get You"		Lennon and McCartney	2:02
5.	"She Loves You"		Lennon and McCartney	2:18
Total length:				11:03

== Personnel ==
According to Ian MacDonald, except where noted:

The Beatles

- John Lennon – lead and backing vocals; rhythm and acoustic guitars (lead guitar solo on "You Can't Do That"); harmonica, handclaps
- Paul McCartney – lead, harmony and backing vocals; bass guitar; handclaps, cowbell
- George Harrison – lead, harmony and backing vocals; lead guitar; handclaps
- Ringo Starr – drums; cowbell, maracas, conga, handclaps

Production and additional personnel

- George Martin – production, mixing; piano on "You Really Got a Hold on Me", "Money (That's What I Want)" and "Long Tall Sally"
- Norman Smith – engineering, mixing
- Dave Dexter Jr. – mixing

== Charts ==
Chart (1964)	Peak position
US Billboard Top LPs	1
US Cashbox Top LPs	1
US Record World Top LPs	1
German Albums (Offizielle Top 100)	50

Chart (2025)	Peak position
Croatian International Albums (HDU)	39
Greek Albums (IFPI)	44

== Certifications ==
Region	Certification	Certified units/sales
Canada (Music Canada)	Platinum	100,000^{^}
United States (RIAA)	2× Platinum	2,051,486
^{^} Shipments figures based on certification alone.

== See also ==
- Outline of the Beatles
- The Beatles timeline
