= Long Tall Sally =

1956 single by Little Richard

Single by Little Richard

from the album Here's Little Richard
- B-side: "Slippin' and Slidin'"
- Released: March 1956
- Recorded: February 7, 1956
- Studio: J&M (New Orleans, Louisiana)
- Genre: Rock and roll
- Length: 2:10
- Label: Specialty
- Songwriters: Enotris Johnson; Robert Blackwell; Richard Penniman
- Producer: Robert Blackwell

Little Richard singles chronology
| "Tutti Frutti" (1955) | "Long Tall Sally" (1956) | "Rip It Up" (1956) |

Music video
- "Long Tall Sally" (audio) on YouTube

"Long Tall Sally", also known as "Long Tall Sally (The Thing)", is a rock and roll song written by Robert "Bumps" Blackwell, Enotris Johnson, and Little Richard and released on Richard's album Here's Little Richard. Richard recorded it for Specialty Records, which released it as a single in March 1956, backed with "Slippin' and Slidin'".

The single reached number one on the Billboard rhythm and blues chart, staying at the top for six of 19 weeks, while peaking at number six on the pop chart. It received the Cash Box Triple Crown Award in 1956. The song as sung by Little Richard is listed at number 55 on Rolling Stone's list of The 500 Greatest Songs of All Time. It also ranked at number 45 on Billboard's year-end singles of 1956.

It became one of the singer's best-known hits and has become a rock and roll standard covered by hundreds of artists, including Elvis Presley, Fleetwood Mac, the Kinks and the Beatles.

In 1999, the 1956 Little Richard recording of "Long Tall Sally" on Specialty Records was inducted into the Grammy Hall of Fame.

== History ==
"Tutti Frutti" was a big hit for Little Richard and Specialty in early 1956, reaching number two on the R&B charts. Pat Boone's cover version of the song from his album Pat Boone reached number 12 on the pop charts. Although this meant an unexpected cash income for the Specialty publishing firm, A&R man and producer Robert "Bumps" Blackwell and a proud Richard decided to write a song that was so up-tempo and the lyrics so fast that Boone would not be able to handle it. (Boone eventually did record his own version, however, which reached number 18.)

According to Blackwell, he was introduced to a little girl by Honey Chile, a popular disc-jockey. The girl had written a song for Little Richard to record so she could pay the treatment for her ailing aunt Mary. The song, actually a few lines on a piece of paper, went like this:

Saw Uncle John with Long Tall Sally
They saw Aunt Mary comin'
So they ducked back in the alley

Not wishing to upset an influential disc-jockey, Blackwell accepted the offer and took the idea to Richard, who was reluctant at first. Nevertheless, the line "ducked back in the alley" was exactly what they were looking for, and Richard kept practicing until he could sing it as fast as possible. They worked on the song, adding verses and a chorus, until they got the hit they wanted. Enotris Johnson (1935–2015) was a local songwriter; her involvement in writing the song, and others, was uncertain until it was confirmed by her family after her death. Featuring a tenor saxophone solo by Lee Allen (as did "Tutti Frutti"), "Long Tall Sally" was the best-selling 45 in the history of Specialty Records.

=== Recording ===
The recording session took place on February 7, 1956, at J&M Recording Studio in New Orleans, owned by Cosimo Matassa on the corner of Rampart and Dumaine where Fats Domino and many other New Orleans luminaries recorded. "Long Tall Sally", as well as many other Little Richard sides, was also recorded there.

The music was a fast uptempo number with Little Richard's hammering, boogie piano. Richard plays staccato straight eighth notes while drummer Earl Palmer plays a fast shuffle. The shuffle was the most common rhythm and blues beat; Richard added the straight eighth notes, much less common in that time, although now standard for rock music. Together this created an ambiguity in the ride rhythm—known to musicians as "playing in the crack" that came to characterize New Orleans (and also Chuck Berry) rock and roll. In typical Little Richard style, he sang in the key of F, in a raw, aggressive, exhilarating style with lyrics being about self-centered fun.

Well, Long Tall Sally
She's built for speed
She's got everything that Uncle John needs

=== Personnel ===
According to Chris Morris' liner notes to the 2017 reissue of Here's Little Richard:

- Little Richard – vocals, piano
- Lee Allen – tenor saxophone
- Edgar Blanchard – guitar
- Frank Fields – double bass
- Earl Palmer – drums
- Alvin "Red" Tyler – baritone saxophone

== Certifications ==
Certifications for "Long Tall Sally"
| Region | Certification | Certified units/sales |
|---|---|---|
| United Kingdom (BPI) | Silver | 200,000^{‡} |
^{‡} Sales+streaming figures based on certification alone.

== The Kinks version ==
"Long Tall Sally"
- Swedish single sleeve

Single by the Kinks
- B-side: "I Took My Baby Home"
- Released: February 7, 1964
- Recorded: January 20, 1964
- Studio: Pye, London
- Genre: Rock and roll; merseybeat
- Label: Pye
- Songwriter: Enotris Johnson
- Producer: Shel Talmy

The Kinks UK singles chronology
| "Long Tall Sally" (1964) | "You Still Want Me" (1964) |

The Kinks US singles chronology
| "Long Tall Sally" (1964) | "You Really Got Me" (1964) |

Music video
- "Long Tall Sally" (audio) on YouTube

=== Background ===
The Kinks started performing in early 1963 under various names, including the Ravens. Their members at the time consisted of Ray Davies, Dave Davies, Pete Quaife and Mickey Willet. Looking to branch out, the Kinks sought out a manager, and after a few unsuccessful meetings, they met Larry Page, who promised the group a certain degree of fame. Page introduced the Ravens to American record producer Shel Talmy along with the Beatles' promoter, Arthur Howes, who was their tour manager. Talmy managed to secure the group a recording contract with Pye Records, who he previously had been collaborating with. Shortly before signing, Willet left the group, upon which they hired drummer Mick Avory who had placed an ad in Melody Maker.

Towards the end of 1963, the Ravens also decided to change their name, becoming the Kinks instead. Unsure of what material they should record as their debut single, Howes, who had heard the Beatles perform "Long Tall Sally" in Paris on January 16, suggested that the Kinks should record the number. However, as the Beatles only performed the track live (and would not record it in the studio for another three months), Howes and Page both noted the commercial opportunity of putting the song on record before the Beatles had time to do so. Page quickly instructed the band to learn the track and on 20 January, the group together with Talmy entered Pye Studios for the first time. They recorded five songs that session: "Long Tall Sally", "I Took My Baby Home", "You Still Want Me", "You Do Something to Me" and "I Don't Need You Anymore". Session musician Bobby Graham played drums on all five songs.

=== Release and reception ===
The Kinks' version was a modernized arrangement of the song, omitting the frantic piano found in the original, along with moving away from R&B towards a contemporary rock sound. The rhythm of the Kinks rendition also changed, instead being similar to Little Richard's later hit "Lucille". Unlike other versions, it featured a "wailing harmonica solo" played by Ray. Rob Jovanovic wrote that their arrangement was similar to the Beatles version, right down to a couple of phrasings in some verses. However, Thomas Kitts stated that "their Merseybeat arrangement zapped the energy from the song" and that Ray's vocals "lacked the necessary fire and punch of either Little Richard or Paul McCartney". Kitts believed that Dave, "who might have sung with more abandonment", should have taken the lead vocals.

The Kinks version was eventually released in the UK through Pye Records on 7 February 1964, and later on Cameo Records in the US on 1 April 1964. The B-side was the Ray Davies original "I Took My Baby Home", which was a "beat-driven rhythm and blues" number. Though Page advertised and promoted "Long Tall Sally" in the media via "an aggressive campaign", it failed to reach the Record Retailer charts. It did, however, reach number 42 for a week in Melody Maker's Pop 30, giving the Kinks their first commercial success. Following their breakthrough in America, "Long Tall Sally" managed to reach the Billboard Bubbling Under Hot 100 chart in January 1965, staying there for two weeks and peaking at number 129.

In Disc magazine, Don Nicholl gave the single three out of five stars. He wrote that despite the Kinks "dress to fit the title", they play "in the most conventional rock fashion, I'm afraid". He stated that he preferred Little Richard's original and said "I Took My Baby Home" was a better song. In Record Mirror, "Long Tall Sally" was described as "pounding stuff" and was considered a very commercial version of the song.

=== Personnel ===
According to band researcher Doug Hinman:

The Kinks

- Ray Davies – lead vocal, rhythm guitar, harmonica
- Dave Davies – backing vocal, lead guitar
- Pete Quaife – backing vocal, bass

Additional musician

- Bobby Graham – drums

=== Charts ===
Chart performance for "Long Tall Sally"
| Chart (1964–65) | Peak position |
|---|---|
| UK Melody Maker National Chart | 42 |
| US Billboard Bubbling Under Hot 100 | 129 |

== The Beatles version ==
"Long Tall Sally"
- Sheet music cover

Song by the Beatles
- Released: April 10, 1964 (US); June 19, 1964 (UK)
- Recorded: March 1, 1964
- Studio: EMI, London
- Genre: Rock and roll
- Length: 2:02
- Label: Capitol (US); Parlophone (UK)
- Songwriters: Enotris Johnson; Richard Penniman; Robert Blackwell
- Producer: George Martin

The Beatles were admirers of Little Richard, and regularly performed his songs during their live act. "Long Tall Sally" was the most durable song in their live repertoire, lasting from their earliest days as the Quarrymen in 1957 through to their last public concert in August 1966. As with the majority of their Little Richard remakes, Paul McCartney sang lead vocals, as he could closely imitate Richard's vocal style.

The group recorded "Long Tall Sally" at EMI Studios in London on March 1, 1964, during sessions for A Hard Day's Night, although it was ultimately not included on that album. The recording was produced by the Beatles' regular producer, George Martin, who also played piano on the track. Given the group's familiarity with the song, the recording was completed in a single take.

In the United Kingdom, "Long Tall Sally" was released on the UK EP of the same name on June 19, 1964, but it had been released earlier on two overseas albums, The Beatles' Second Album in the United States on April 10, 1964, and The Beatles' Long Tall Sally in Canada on May 11, 1964. Released as a single in Sweden, the song reached number two on Tio i Topp in June and topped the Kvällstoppen Chart in July and August. It also reached number one in Denmark. On March 7, 1988, the song appeared on Past Masters, a compilation album that compiles every song commercially released by the band that was neither included on the 12 UK studio albums nor the US Magical Mystery Tour LP, making it appear for the first time to be included on a core catalogue album.

The song appears in the 1994 film Backbeat. Upon viewing it, Paul McCartney was reported to say:

One of my annoyances about the film Backbeat is that they've actually taken my rock 'n' rollness off me. They give John "Long Tall Sally" to sing and he never sang it in his life. But now it's set in cement. ['Paul' sang Long Tall Sally in the Glasgow stage version]. It's like the Buddy Holly and Glenn Miller stories. The Buddy Holly Story does not even mention Norman Petty, and The Glenn Miller Story is a sugarcoated version of his life. Now Backbeat has done the same thing to the story of the Beatles. I was quite taken, however, with Stephen Dorff's astonishing performance as Stu.

=== Other Beatles recordings and performances ===
In addition to their studio recording of the song, the Beatles recorded "Long Tall Sally" for BBC radio broadcasts on seven occasions during 1963 and 1964. Two of those versions have been officially released, on the compilation albums Live at the BBC (1994) and On Air – Live at the BBC Volume 2 (2013). In addition, a studio version, prerecorded specially from the 1964 television special Around the Beatles, was included on the Anthology 1 compilation (1995). The live album The Beatles at the Hollywood Bowl (1977) includes a 1964 concert recording of the song.

"Long Tall Sally" was the last song the Beatles performed live in front of a paying audience. It was a frequent set closer during their 1966 tour—which would turn out to be their last—and they used it to close out their final show at San Francisco's Candlestick Park on August 29, 1966. The band asked their press officer, Tony Barrow, to make an audio tape recording of the concert for posterity. The recording has since circulated heavily among bootleggers, but the 30-minute tape ran out at the end of the second verse of "Long Tall Sally", meaning that the last moments of the Beatles' final paid performance are lost to history.

=== Personnel ===
According to Ian MacDonald, except where noted:

The Beatles

- Paul McCartney – lead vocals, bass
- John Lennon – rhythm guitar, guitar solo (first)
- George Harrison – lead guitar, guitar solo (second)
- Ringo Starr – drums

Additional musician

- George Martin – piano

== Notes ==
=== Sources ===
- Fleiner, Carey (2017). The Kinks: A Thoroughly English Phenomenon. Lanham, Maryland: Rowman & Littlefield. ISBN 978-1-4422-3542-7.
- Gillett, Charlie (1996). The Sound of the City: The Rise of Rock and Roll (Second ed.). New York City: Da Capo Press. ISBN 978-0-306-80683-4.
- Hinman, Doug (2004). The Kinks: All Day and All of the Night: Day by Day Concerts, Recordings, and Broadcasts, 1961–1996. San Francisco, California: Backbeat Books. ISBN 978-0-87930-765-3.
- Jovanovic, Rob (2013). God Save the Kinks: A Biography. London: Aurum Press. ISBN 978-1-84513-671-0.
- Kitts, Thomas M. (2008). Ray Davies: Not Like Everybody Else. New York City: Routledge. ISBN 978-0-415-97768-5.
- Leigh, Spencer (2017). Elvis Presley: Caught in a Trap. Carmarthen: McNidder & Grace. ISBN 978-0-85716-166-6.
- Lewisohn, Mark (2000) [1992]. The Complete Beatles Chronicle: The Only Definitive Guide to the Beatles' Entire Career. London: Hamlyn. ISBN 0-600-60033-5.
- MacDonald, Ian (2007). Revolution in the Head: The Beatles' Records and the Sixties (Third ed.). Chicago Review Press. ISBN 978-1-55652-733-3.
- Perone, James E. (2009). Mods, Rockers, and the Music of the British Invasion. Santa Barbara, California: ABC-CLIO. ISBN 978-0-275-99860-8.
- Savage, Jon (1984). The Kinks: The Official Biography. London: Faber and Faber. ISBN 978-0-571-13407-6.
- White, Charles (1988). Life and Times of Little Richard Rack: Quasar of Rock. New York City: Pocket Books. ISBN 978-0-671-67306-2.
- Winn, John C. (2008). Way Beyond Compare: The Beatles' Recorded Legacy, Volume One, 1957–1965. New York City: Three Rivers Press. ISBN 978-0-307-45157-6.
