= She Loves You =

- US picture sleeve

Single by the Beatles
- B-side: "I'll Get You"
- Released: 23 August 1963 (UK); 16 September 1963 (US)
- Recorded: 1 July 1963
- Studio: EMI, London
- Genre: Rock; pop; rock and roll
- Length: 2:19
- Label: Parlophone (UK), Swan (US)
- Songwriter: Lennon–McCartney
- Producer: George Martin

The Beatles singles chronology
"From Me to You" (1963)	"She Loves You" (1963)	"I Want to Hold Your Hand" (1963)

Official audio
- "She Loves You" (Remastered 2009) on YouTube

"She Loves You" is a song by the English rock band the Beatles, written by John Lennon and Paul McCartney and released as a single in the United Kingdom on 23 August 1963. The single set and surpassed several sales records in the United Kingdom charts, and set a record in the United States as one of the five Beatles songs that held the top five positions in the charts simultaneously, on 4 April 1964. It remains the band's best-selling single in the UK and was the top-selling single of the 1960s there by any artist.

In November 2004, Rolling Stone ranked "She Loves You" number 64 on their list of the 500 Greatest Songs of All Time. In August 2009, at the end of its "Beatles Weekend", BBC Radio 2 announced that "She Loves You" was the Beatles' all-time best-selling single in the UK based on information compiled by the Official Charts Company.

In Canada, the song was included on the album Twist and Shout. In the US, it was the final song on The Beatles' Second Album.

== Composition ==
Lennon and McCartney started composing "She Loves You" on 26 June 1963 after a concert at the Majestic Ballroom in Newcastle upon Tyne during their tour with Roy Orbison and Gerry and the Pacemakers. They began writing the song on the tour bus, and continued later that night at their hotel in Newcastle, (Note: In 2003, plans to install a plaque at the hotel were stalled, when it transpired that surviving Beatles Paul McCartney and Ringo Starr were unable to recall whether the group had stayed at the Imperial Hotel or Royal Turk's Head (although it was reported that a taxi driver remembered dropping them off at the latter in 1963).) eventually completing it the following day at McCartney's family home in Forthlin Road, Liverpool.

In 2000, McCartney said the initial idea for the song began with Bobby Rydell's hit "Forget Him" with its call and response pattern, and that "as often happens, you think of one song when you write another [...] I'd planned an 'answering song' where a couple of us would sing 'she loves you' and the other ones would answer 'yeah yeah'. We decided that was a crummy idea but at least we then had the idea of a song called 'She Loves You'. So we sat in the hotel bedroom for a few hours and wrote it – John and I, sitting on twin beds with guitars."

Like many early Beatles songs, the title of "She Loves You" was framed around the use of personal pronouns. However, unusually for a love song, the lyrics are not about the narrator's love for someone else; instead the narrator functions as a helpful go-between for estranged lovers:

You think you lost your love,
Well, I saw her yesterday.
It's you she's thinking of –
And she told me what to say.
She says she loves you ...

This idea was attributed by Lennon to McCartney in 1980: "It was Paul's idea: instead of singing 'I love you' again, we'd have a third party. That kind of little detail is still in his work. He will write a story about someone. I'm more inclined to write about myself."

"She Loves You" sample

Lennon, being mindful of Elvis Presley's "All Shook Up", wanted something equally stirring: "I don't know where the 'yeah yeah yeah' came from [but] I remember when Elvis did 'All Shook Up' it was the first time in my life that I had heard 'uh huh', 'oh yeah', and 'yeah yeah' all sung in the same song". The song also included a number of falsetto "wooooo"s, which Lennon acknowledged as being inspired by the Isley Brothers' recording of "Twist and Shout", which the Beatles had earlier recorded, and which had also been inserted into the group's previous single, "From Me to You". As Lennon later said: "We stuck it in everything". McCartney recalls them playing the finished song on acoustic guitars to his father Jim at home immediately after the song was completed: "We went into the living room and said 'Dad, listen to this. What do you think? And he said 'That's very nice son, but there's enough of these Americanisms around. Couldn't you sing 'She loves you, yes, yes, yes!' At which point we collapsed in a heap and said 'No, Dad, you don't quite get it!'" EMI recording engineer Norman Smith had a somewhat similar reaction, later recounting, "I was setting up the microphone when I first saw the lyrics on the music stand, 'She loves you, yeah, yeah, yeah, She loves you, yeah, yeah, yeah, She loves you, yeah, yeah, yeah, Yeah!' I thought, Oh my God, what a lyric! This is going to be one that I do not like. But when they started to sing it – bang, wow, terrific, I was up at the mixer jogging around."

The "yeah, yeah, yeah" refrain proved an immediate, infectious musical hook. Unusually, the song starts with the hook right away, instead of introducing it after a verse or two. "She Loves You" does not include a bridge, instead using the refrain to join the various verses. The chords tend to change every two measures, and the harmonic scheme is mostly static.

The arrangement starts with a two-count from Starr on the drums, and his fills are an important part of the record throughout. The electric instruments are mixed higher than before, especially McCartney's bass, adding to the sense of musical power that the record provides. The lead vocal is sung by Lennon and McCartney, switching between unison and harmony.

George Martin, the Beatles' producer, questioned the validity of the major sixth chord that ends the song, an idea suggested by George Harrison. "They sort of finished on this curious singing chord which was a major sixth, with George [Harrison] doing the sixth and the others doing the third and fifth in the chord. It was just like a Glenn Miller arrangement." The device had also been used by country music-influenced artists in the 1950s. McCartney later reflected: "We took it to George Martin and sang 'She loves you, yeah, yeah, yeah, yeeeeeaah ...' and that tight little sixth cluster we had at the end. George [Martin] said: 'It's very corny, I would never end on a sixth'. But we said 'It's such a great sound, it doesn't matter'." The Beatles: Complete Scores shows only the notes D (the fifth) and E (the sixth) sung for the final chord, while on the recording McCartney sang G (the root) as Harrison sang E and Lennon sang D.

In the opinion of Roger McGuinn of the Byrds, writers who attempt to define the origins of folk rock "don't realise that the Beatles were responsible as far back as 1963". He cites "She Loves You" as one of the first examples where the Beatles introduced folk chord changes into rock music and so initiated the new genre. These songs were all influential in providing a template for successfully assimilating folk-based chord progressions and melodies into pop music.

== Recording ==
The song was recorded on 1 July 1963, less than a week after it was written, using a two-track recording machine. Documentation regarding the number of takes required and other recording details does not exist. Early takes of the song featured the use of a Maestro FZ-1 Fuzz-Tone on Harrison's guitar. Mixing was carried out on 4 July. Standard procedure at EMI Studios at the time was to erase the original two-track session tape for singles once they had been mixed down to the (usually monaural) master tape used to press records. This was the fate of four Beatles songs that were released as two singles: "Love Me Do", "P.S. I Love You", "She Loves You" and "I'll Get You". These tracks only exist as a mono master, although several mock-stereo remixes have been made by EMI affiliates worldwide, including a few made in 1966 by Abbey Road engineer Geoff Emerick. A true stereo mix of "She Loves You", created by Giles Martin using machine learning technology commissioned by filmmaker Peter Jackson, was released in 2023 as part of the expanded edition of the 1962–1966 compilation album.

The German division of EMI (the parent of the Beatles' British record label Parlophone Records) decided that the only way to sell Beatles records in Germany would be to re-record them in the German language. The band thought it unnecessary, but were asked by George Martin to comply, recording "Sie liebt dich" on 29 January 1964, along with "Komm, gib mir deine Hand", at the Pathé Marconi Studios in Paris. They recorded new vocals over the original backing track to "I Want to Hold Your Hand;" "Sie liebt dich" was recorded entirely from scratch. The German lyrics for "Sie liebt dich" were written by Camillo Felgen under the pseudonym of "Jean Nicolas" (his full name was Camille Jean Nicolas Felgen).

== Release ==
=== United Kingdom ===
On 23 August 1963, the "She Loves You" single was released in the United Kingdom with "I'll Get You" as the B-side. The songwriting credit on the label was switched to "Lennon–McCartney" for this release – a switch from the "McCartney–Lennon" order of nearly all previous Beatles releases – and would remain this way during the remainder of their songwriting partnership.

There was tremendous anticipation ahead of the release. Thousands of fans had ordered the group's next single as early as June, well before a title had been known. By the day before it went on sale, some 500,000 advanced orders had been placed for it. The single set several British sales records. It entered the charts on 31 August and remained in the charts for 31 consecutive weeks, 18 of those weeks in the top three (including every week of the months of September, October, November and December 1963). During that period, it claimed the ranking of number one on 14 September, stayed number one for four weeks, dropped back to the top three, then regained the top spot for two weeks starting on 30 November. This regaining of the top spot was very unusual at the time. It then made its way back into the charts for two weeks on 11 April 1964, peaking at No. 42. It passed sales of a half million copies by early June and a million by late November, whereupon it was awarded a gold record. The song's run on the charts coincided with the 13 October 1963 performance of the group on Sunday Night at the London Palladium and the emergence of full-blown Beatlemania in the United Kingdom.

"She Loves You" was the best-selling single of 1963, and is the Beatles' all-time best-selling single in the UK. It was the best-selling single of any artist in the UK for 14 years until it was surpassed by Wings' "Mull of Kintyre" (written by McCartney and Denny Laine). As of November 2022, "She Loves You" was the ninth best-selling single of all time in the UK, with sales of 1.93 million copies.

=== United States ===
The group's lack of success in the US puzzled the Beatles' producer George Martin and manager Brian Epstein, given their huge hits in the UK. Their only US release that had charted was "From Me to You", which lasted three weeks in August 1963, never going higher than No. 116 on the Billboard Hot 100. Capitol Records had been stubborn in turning down the chance to become their record label in the US, and consequently the Beatles had been with Vee-Jay Records until that label failed to pay their royalties on time. Transglobal Music, an affiliate of EMI, held the licences to their output in the US, and promptly ordered Vee-Jay to halt their manufacturing and distribution of Beatles records. Epstein, who needed a record label to release "She Loves You" in the US, asked Transglobal to find another label for him, and Transglobal came up with Swan Records. To avoid potential disagreements and lawsuits, the contract signed with Swan licensed to them only "She Loves You" and "I'll Get You", enough only for the A- and B-sides of a single – and only for two years.

When "She Loves You" came out as a single in the US on 16 September 1963, it received a positive notice in Billboard, but garnered very little radio airplay. New York disc jockey Murray the K saw it place third out of five in a listener record contest, but it failed to take off from that. The song was also featured as a part of the Rate-a-Record segment of American Bandstand where it scored in the low 70s, noticeably lower than those songs considered to score well. Overall, it sold approximately 1,000 copies and completely failed to chart on Billboard.

On 22 November 1963, the CBS Morning News ran a five-minute feature on Beatlemania in the UK which heavily featured "She Loves You". The evening's scheduled repeat was cancelled following the assassination of John F. Kennedy the same day and the four days' worth of news coverage that followed. Coincidental with the song's climb up the Canadian charts on 10 December, Walter Cronkite decided to transmit the piece again on the CBS Evening News, and the resulting interest led to the rush-release of "I Want to Hold Your Hand"—only weeks before the Beatles' arrival—on 26 December 1963.

"I Want to Hold Your Hand" climbed to No. 1 by the end of January 1964, launching the "British Invasion" of the American music scene and paving the way for more Beatles records and releases by other British artists. In the wake of that success, the Swan "She Loves You" single re-emerged, and entered the Billboard chart on 25 January 1964. Beatlemania took hold of America, spurred by the group's appearances on The Ed Sullivan Show in February, where they performed this among other songs. "She Loves You" spent four weeks at No. 2, behind "I Want to Hold Your Hand", then replaced it for two weeks at No. 1 beginning on 21 March. The Beatles are one of only two artists ever whose first two Hot 100 singles held the top two positions simultaneously on that chart. During its fifteen-week run on the American charts, "She Loves You" was joined by four other Beatles songs at the top five in the American charts and became part of the group setting several all-time records for the Hot 100. Billboard ranked the record as the No. 2 song of 1964, behind "I Want to Hold Your Hand", making the Beatles the second act to hold the top two year-end record positions since Elvis Presley did it in 1956 with "Heartbreak Hotel" and "Don't Be Cruel".

When Beatlemania reached the US, the record labels holding rights to Beatle songs re-released them in various combinations. Swan claimed to own the rights to "Sie Liebt Dich", the German version of "She Loves You", although they did not. On 21 May 1964, "Sie Liebt Dich" was released by Swan in the US, featuring "I'll Get You" on the B-side, just like the English-language single. American consumers bought "Sie Liebt Dich" in modest numbers, leading to a chart peak of No. 97 on 27 June.

"She Loves You" was included on Capitol Records' US album The Beatles' Second Album, which overtook Meet the Beatles! on 2 May 1964, reaching the top spot in the album charts. It was the first time an artist had replaced themselves at the summit of the American album charts, and this provided a hint of the successes the Beatles would continue to achieve.

=== Other countries ===
Unlike Capitol Records' reluctance to proceed with the Beatles in the US, its Canadian subsidiary, Capitol of Canada, went ahead with the group, and "She Loves You" was released there in September 1963. It was played by Ontario radio station CKWS the next month, and entered the national CHUM Chart on 2 December 1963. It reached the top five on 23 December, a full month before any Beatles single would do the same in the US charts. It then spent nine weeks at No. 1 in the early part of 1964.

"She Loves You" became the first Beatles record to sell well in continental Europe and led to a Beatles tour of Sweden in late October 1963. Before the Beatles' breakthrough with "She Loves You", British acts had only managed sporadic successes in continental European markets.

== Cultural impact and legacy ==
"She Loves You" is the song that thrust the Beatles full-scale into the British national spotlight. Part of this was the effectiveness of the song's hook; author Eric Starr wrote in retrospect, "Each chorus or refrain pounds the hook into your head until it's imprinted in your brain." As Nicholas Schaffner later wrote, it was "'yeah, yeah, yeah' chanted repeatedly and emphatically enough to drive any listener out of his mind, one way or the other."

Moreover, it became the signature phrase for the group at the time. The Daily Mirror's approving editorial of 5 November 1963, following the Beatles' acclaimed appearance at the Royal Variety Performance the night before, was entitled "Yeah! Yeah! Yeah!" The New York Times' lengthy article of 8 February 1964, describing the frenzy accompanying the group's arrival at John F. Kennedy International Airport and in New York City, made reference to "Yeah, yeah, yeah" in its first paragraph, continuation headline, and closing paragraph. An Associated Press story describing the positive critical reaction to the group's film A Hard Day's Night was headlined "'Yeah, Yeah, Yeah' For Beatles' Film" and labelled "She Loves You" as "the original 'Yeah, Yeah, Yeah,' song".

The phrase became synonymous not just with the Beatles but with the associated kind of popular music overall. A New York Times account describing the Animals' introductory concert in the city later that year repeated the phrase in description of the group.

Clinton Heylin remarked that the chorus "no, no, no" in Bob Dylan's 1964 song "It Ain't Me, Babe" was taken as a parody of the Beatles' "yeah, yeah, yeah" in "She Loves You". The melody in both phrases uses a scale descending through a minor third.

In the 22 January 1965, Flintstones episode "The Hatrocks and The Gruesomes", as new hillbilly neighbors, the "Hatrocks" (who, it is revealed early on, hate 'Bug Music' by 'The Four Insects'—an obvious dig at the Beatles at the time), outgrow their welcome, the Flintstones and Rubbles rig their radio and phone and, wearing Beatle wigs, broadcast a performance of "She Said 'Yeah! Yeah! Yeah!'", driving them out of their house and over to the Gruesomes, who are also performing the song while wearing Beatle wigs.

In 1975, authors Roy Carr and Tony Tyler wrote in The Beatles: An Illustrated Record that "If a future archivist were to select one single tune to characterise the Beatles' appeal and the stylistic devices for which they became world famous, he would be forced to choose 'She Loves You'." In 1979, author Greil Marcus included "She Loves You" in his Stranded: Rock and Roll for a Desert Island list of essential rock records. Even more fundamentally, Marcus posed the question of what one would tell a Martian who landed and asked the meaning of rock and roll? The first answer would be "She Loves You".

The British establishment at that time found the refrain "yeah, yeah, yeah" controversial. National radio in the form of the BBC broadcast the single and "in some quarters it was seen to hail the collapse of civilised society".

"Yeah, yeah, yeah" was to have a great effect on the Beatles' image – in some parts of Europe, they became known as the yeah-yeahs or yé-yés.

As late as the mid-1970s, some countries in Southeast Asia were still putting out edicts that forbade Beatles haircuts and so-called "yeah, yeah, yeah music". Malaysia was an outlier in the region, its media ecosystem encouraging the thriving of Beatles-inspired rock music and giving birth to the pop yeh-yeh genre during this period.

In 1965, at the 11th Plenary Meeting of the Central Committee of the Socialist Unity Party of Germany in the Communist German Democratic Republic, the party's General Secretary Walter Ulbricht referenced the song in a famous speech about copying culture from the Western world, by using the refrain: "Is it truly the case that we have to copy every dirt that comes from the West? I think, comrades, with the monotony of the yeah, yeah, yeah and whatever it is all called, yes, we should put an end to it".

British Prime Minister Alec Douglas-Home made a gaffe in February 1964: his speechwriters, trying to make him appear in touch with popular culture, wrote him the line, "I'm too modest to claim the country loves us, but you know that can't be bad." However, he appeared not to understand the reference, and actually said, "but you know, err, that can't be too bad."

On 10 December 1980, following the murder of John Lennon in Manhattan two nights previously, British tabloid newspaper The Sun printed the front-page headline "They Loved Him Yeah Yeah Yeah".

On 27 July 2012, a portion of "She Loves You" as well as footage of the band performing the song was included in a montage of British music during the opening ceremony of the London 2012 Olympic Games. In 2018, the music staff of Time Out London ranked the song at number 7 on their list of the best Beatles songs.

Ozzy Osbourne credited the song as the inspiration for him to become a musician. Osbourne went on to become a co-founding member of Black Sabbath in 1968, one of the pioneers of the heavy metal genre.

== Later Beatles use ==
"She Loves You" was sometimes played by the group during performances on the BBC, and one such recording is included on On Air – Live at the BBC Volume 2, released in 2013. A concert performance of the song, recorded at the Prince of Wales Theatre, London, on 4 November 1963, for the Royal Variety Performance, appeared in 1995 on Anthology 1.

Although not one of the new songs that predominated in their July 1964 film debut A Hard Day's Night, it was used as the finale of the concert that closes the movie.

"She Loves You" was a staple of the set list of early Beatles tours, and appeared on The Beatles at the Hollywood Bowl. By late 1964, it had been dropped in favour of newer songs and the other artists' material that remained in their show. It did not appear in the group's 1965 or 1966 concert performances.

The Beatles later sang the chorus of "She Loves You" in the long fade-out of "All You Need Is Love", and a carnival-styled organ version of the song is featured in their 1967 television film Magical Mystery Tour. Some critics speculate that the yeah yeah yeah cries at the end of each verse in "Polythene Pam" are also a deliberate reference to "She Loves You". The musicologist Alan W. Pollack chews on this suggestion but also considers whether the yeah, yeah, yeah refrain was "by this point in time just a lazy habit".

"She Loves You" was included in the Beatles compilation albums A Collection of Beatles Oldies (1966, not released in the US), 1962–1966 (1973), 20 Greatest Hits (1982), Past Masters, Volume One (1988), and 1 (2000). The song was also included on the American promotional version of the Rarities album, issued as the bonus disc in the limited edition boxed set The Beatles Collection, in November 1978. The Capitol Records' US album, The Beatles' Second Album, on which the song had been featured, was included in the 2004 CD release The Capitol Albums, Volume 1 and rereleased in 2014, individually and in the boxed set The US Albums.

"Sie Liebt Dich" was included on both the 1978 British Rarities and the 1980 American Rarities as well as on Past Masters, Volume One.

The 2009 CD rerelease of the Beatles' catalog included "She Loves You" and "Sie Liebt Dich" on Past Masters (mono and stereo, respectively) and on Mono Masters (mono).

Paul McCartney sang "We love you, yeah, yeah, yeah" at the end of his duet with Stevie Wonder titled "What's That You're Doing?" from Tug of War. McCartney has not played the full song in any of his Wings or solo concert tours, but has replicated its use to end performances of "All You Need Is Love" during his 2011–2012 On the Run Tour.

== Personnel ==
Personnel per Ian MacDonald

- John Lennon – vocal, rhythm guitar
- Paul McCartney – vocal, bass
- George Harrison – harmony vocal, lead guitar
- Ringo Starr – drums
- George Martin – producer
- Norman Smith – engineer

== Charts ==
=== Weekly charts ===
Chart (1963–1964)	Peak position
Australia (Kent Music Report)	3
Canada (CHUM) Top Singles	1
Denmark (Salgshitlisterne Top 20)	1
Finland (The Official Finnish Charts)	4
Ireland (IRMA)	2
Italy (Musica e Dischi)	4
Netherlands (Single Top 100)	7
New Zealand (Lever Hit Parade)	1
Norway (VG-lista)	1
Sweden (Kvällstoppen)	1
Sweden (Tio i Topp)	1
UK Singles (Official Charts)	1
US Billboard Hot 100	1
US Cash Box Top 100	1
West German Media Control Singles Chart	7

Chart (2015)	Peak position
Sweden Heatseeker (Sverigetopplistan)	14

=== Year-end charts ===
Chart (1963)	Rank
UK Singles (OCC)	1

Chart (1964)	Rank
US Billboard Hot 100	2
US Cash Box Top 100	2

=== All-time charts ===
Chart	Position
UK Singles (Official Charts Company)	10

== Certifications ==
Certifications for "She Loves You"
Region	Certification	Certified units/sales
United Kingdom (BPI)	Silver	200,000^{‡}
^{‡} Sales+streaming figures based on certification alone.

== Cover versions ==
Many artists recorded versions of "She Loves You" in the early 1960s including Brenda Lee, for whom the Beatles had acted as a support act when she headlined a gig at the Star Club in Hamburg, West Germany, in 1962. Renamed "He Loves You", it appeared on her 1965 album, Top Teen Hits (also known as Brenda Lee Sings Top Teen Hits).

English group McFly released a cover of "She Loves You" as the B-side of their hit "That Girl". It also appears on their LP The Greatest Bits: B-Sides & Rarities which was only available at Woolworths stores in the UK.

Several recording artists included the song on albums made up of nothing but Beatles covers: Mary Wells in 1965 on her album Love Songs to the Beatles, where it was also renamed "He Loves You"; bandleader Count Basie on the 1966 album Basie's Beatle Bag; and the cartoon group the Chipmunks, whose The Chipmunks Sing the Beatles Hits included "She Loves You". The Chipmunks later covered the song again on the album The Chipmunks: Rockin' Through the Decades.

Peter Sellers recorded six different "speaking" cover versions of the song, using different voices/accents, three of which have been rereleased on the 4-disc collection A Celebration of Sellers:

- Irish (twice, each with a different ending [one extremely sexual])
- Cockney
- "Chinless Wonder"
- Upper-class British
- Inspired by Dr. Strangelove

== Sources ==
- Badman, Keith (2000). The Beatles Off The Record. London: Omnibus Press. ISBN 0-7119-7985-5.
- The Beatles (2000). The Beatles Anthology. London: Cassell & Co. ISBN 0-304-35605-0.
- The Beatles: Complete Scores. Milwaukee: Hal Leonard. 1993. ISBN 0-7935-1832-6.
- Carr, Roy; Tyler, Tony (1975). The Beatles: An Illustrated Record. New York: Harmony Books. ISBN 0-517-52045-1.
- Castleman, Harry; Podrazik, Walter J. (1975). All Together Now: The First Complete Beatles Discography 1961−1975. New York: Ballantine Books. ISBN 0-345-25680-8.
- Davies, Hunter (1968). The Beatles: The Authorized Biography (paperback). New York: Dell Publishing.
- Ellen, Mark (October 2002). "Mojo Special Limited Edition". Mojo. London.
- Everett, Walter (2001). The Beatles as Musicians: The Quarry Men Through Rubber Soul. New York: Oxford University Press. ISBN 0-19-514104-0.
- Harry, Bill (2000). The Beatles Encyclopedia: Revised and Updated. London: Virgin Publishing. ISBN 0-7535-0481-2.
- Lewisohn, Mark (1988). The Beatles Recording Sessions. New York: Harmony Books. ISBN 0-517-57066-1.
- MacDonald, Ian (2005). Revolution in the Head: The Beatles' Records and the Sixties (Second Revised ed.). London: Pimlico (Rand). ISBN 1-84413-828-3.
- Marcus, Greil (1979). Stranded: Rock and Roll for a Desert Island. New York: Alfred A. Knopf. ISBN 0-394-50828-9.
- Miles, Barry (1997). Paul McCartney: Many Years From Now. New York: Henry Holt and Company. ISBN 0-8050-5249-6.
- Rayl, A. J. S.; Gunther, Curt (1989). Beatles '64: A Hard Day's Night in America. New York: Doubleday. ISBN 0-385-24583-1.
- Riley, Tim (2002). Tell Me Why – The Beatles: Album by Album, Song by Song, the Sixties and After. Cambridge, Massachusetts: Da Capo Press. ISBN 978-0-306-81120-3.
- Schaffner, Nicholas (1977). The Beatles Forever. Harrisburg, Pennsylvania: Cameron House. ISBN 0-8117-0225-1.
- Starr, Eric (2007). The Everything Rock & Blues Piano Book: Master riffs, licks, and blues styles from New Orleans to New York City. Avon, Massachusetts: F+W Publications Inc. ISBN 978-1-59869-260-0.
- Womack, Kenneth (2007). Long and Winding Roads: The Evolving Artistry of the Beatles. New York City, New York, & London, England: Continuum. ISBN 978-0-8264-1746-6.
