= Yellow Submarine (album) =

1969 studio album/soundtrack by the Beatles

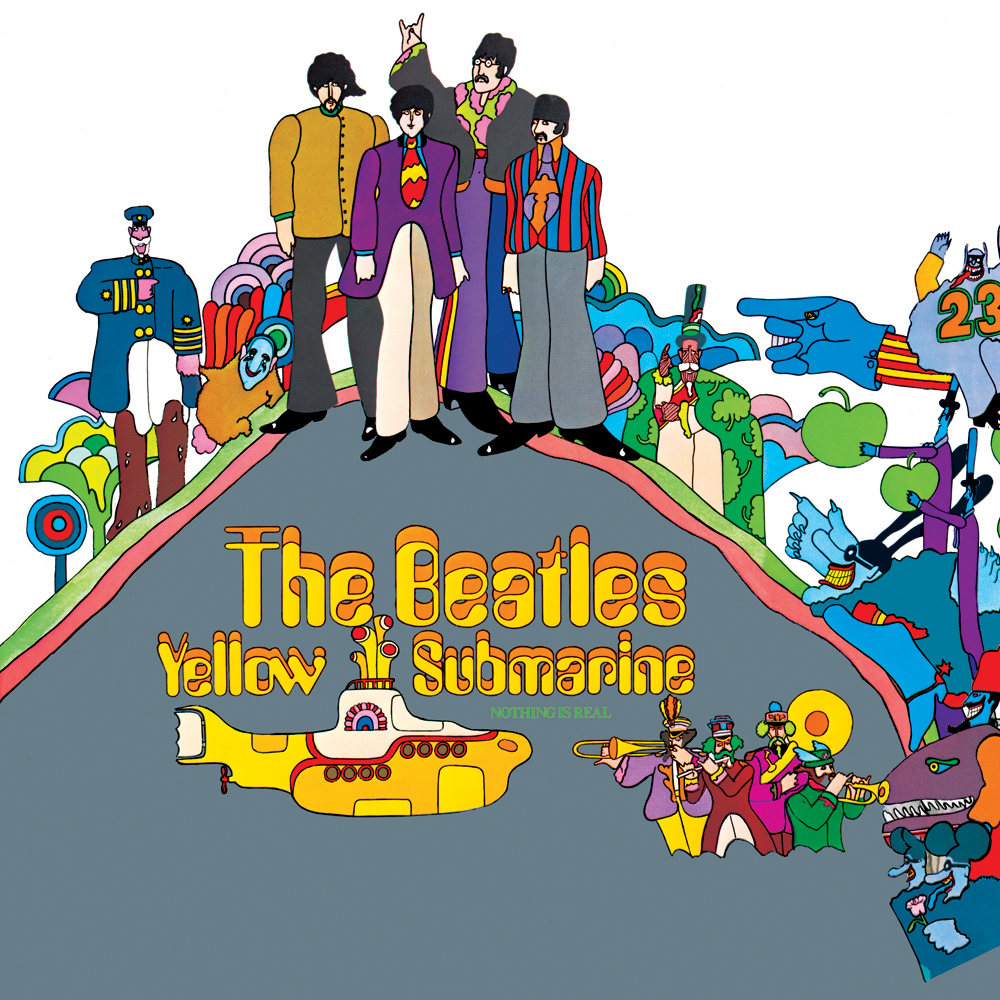

Studio album / soundtrack album by the Beatles and film score by George Martin
- Released: 13 January 1969
- Recorded: 26 May 1966 – 11 February 1968 (The Beatles); 22–23 October 1968 (George Martin)
- Studios: EMI and De Lane Lea, London
- Genres: Psychedelia; film score
- Length: 39:16
- Label: Apple
- Producer: George Martin

The Beatles chronology
The Beatles (1968)	Yellow Submarine (1969)	Abbey Road (1969)

Yellow Submarine is the tenth studio album by the English rock band the Beatles, released in January 1969. It is the soundtrack to the animated film of the same name, which premiered in London in July 1968. The album contains six songs by the Beatles, including four new songs and the previously released "Yellow Submarine" and "All You Need Is Love". The remainder of the album is a re-recording of selections from the film's orchestral soundtrack by the band's producer, George Martin.

The project was regarded as a contractual obligation by the Beatles, who were asked to supply four new songs for the film. Some were written and recorded specifically for the soundtrack, while others were unreleased tracks from other projects. The album was recorded before – and issued two months after – the band's self-titled double LP (also known as the "White Album") and was not viewed by the band as a significant release. An EP containing only the new songs had been considered, and was mastered, but left unreleased. The original mono mixes were later included in the 2009 compilation Mono Masters.

Yellow Submarine reached the top 5 in the UK and the US. It has since been afforded a mixed reception from music critics, some of whom consider that it falls short of the high standard generally associated with the Beatles' work. Another version of the album, Yellow Submarine Songtrack, was issued on the film's 30th anniversary. It dispenses with the George Martin orchestral works, and includes the six Beatles songs from the original album, along with an additional nine songs heard in the film, all newly remixed.

== Background and recording ==
The album arose from contractual obligations as part of the Beatles' three-picture deal with United Artists. With the band having disliked their previous film Help!, it was agreed that an animated film Yellow Submarine would fulfil their obligation as it reduced their involvement, though they reluctantly agreed to record four new songs for the film. Having recently completed their album Sgt. Pepper's Lonely Hearts Club Band in April 1967, the group showed minimal enthusiasm for the project. Along with the music for their Magical Mystery Tour TV film, the Yellow Submarine soundtrack was part of a period that author Ian MacDonald later described as the band's "regime of continuous low-intensity recording ... it had a workaday quality about it – an intrinsic lack of tension which was bound to colour the resulting material."

=== Soundtrack songs ===
There was a commitment for The Beatles to do four songs for the film. Apparently, they would say, this is a lousy song, let's give it to Brodax.

— Al Brodax, producer of the Yellow Submarine film

Only one side of the album contains songs performed by the Beatles; of the six, two of them were previously released. "Yellow Submarine" had been issued in August 1966 as a single, topping the UK chart for four weeks, and had also been released on the album Revolver. Following the Beatles' performance of the song on the Our World international television broadcast, "All You Need Is Love" had been issued as a single as well, in July 1967, and had also been included on the Capitol Records LP release of Magical Mystery Tour in November 1967. A stereo mix was made of this song on 29 October 1968 for release on this album.

Of the unreleased tracks, the first to be recorded was George Harrison's "Only a Northern Song", taped in February 1967 but rejected for inclusion on Sgt. Pepper. The group performed overdubs on this basic track in April, immediately after completing the stereo mixes for that album. Among the sounds added during what Beatles historian Mark Lewisohn describes as "a curious session", were trumpet, glockenspiel and spoken voices. (Note: Acknowledging his limited ability on the trumpet, Paul McCartney recalled seeing "some very sad faces" among the film's producers, who were attending the session.) Harrison's lyrics reflect his displeasure at being merely a contracted songwriter to the Beatles' publishing company, Northern Songs.

"All Together Now" was recorded in a single session on 12 May 1967, specifically for the film project. The title came from a phrase Paul McCartney had heard as a child, to encourage everyone to sing music hall songs. He later described the song as "a throwaway".

The band recorded Harrison's "It's All Too Much" in late May 1967 at De Lane Lea Studios in central London. Inspired by its author's experimentation with the drug LSD, and originally running to over eight minutes in length, the song reflects the Summer of Love philosophy of 1967 and makes extensive use of guitar feedback. As with the later recorded "All You Need Is Love", the track includes musical and lyrical quotations from other works – in this case, a trumpet passage from Jeremiah Clarke's "Prince of Denmark's March" and a lyric from the Merseys' 1966 hit "Sorrow".

John Lennon's "Hey Bulldog" was recorded on 11 February 1968 and evolved from an initial intent to shoot a promotional film for the single "Lady Madonna". Like "All Together Now", it was specifically recorded with the film soundtrack in mind. The track's ending contained a jam session after the point where a fade-out was intended in the final mix, which was kept in the finished version. (Note: "Baby, You're a Rich Man" was also originally intended for the film soundtrack, but was released as the B-side to "All You Need Is Love" instead and was not included on the Yellow Submarine album.) Lennon later described the song as "a good-sounding record that means nothing".

=== George Martin orchestral works ===
Side 2 consists of re-recordings of the symphonic film score composed by the Beatles' producer, George Martin, specifically for the album. The recording took place with a 41-piece orchestra over two three-hour sessions on 22 and 23 October 1968 in Abbey Road, and was edited down to the length on the LP on 22 November.

In some of his compositions, Martin referenced his past work with the Beatles; for example, "Sea of Time" includes what MacDonald terms "an affectionate quotation" from the Indian-styled "Within You Without You", from Sgt. Pepper, and "Yellow Submarine in Pepperland" reprises the film's title track. In "Sea of Monsters", Martin included the beginning of Bach's Air on the G String, while in other selections he parodies works by Stravinsky. MacDonald also detects the influence of Mozart and Webern among the "classical allusions" in Martin's score.

== Release ==
The film received its worldwide premiere in London in July 1968, by which time the Beatles were busy working on their self-titled double album, commonly called "the White Album". After viewing the finished film, the Beatles were much more enthusiastic and did more to associate themselves with it after its release. Having been delayed so that it would not clash with the release of The Beatles, and to allow for the re-recording of Martin's contributions, Yellow Submarine was issued by Apple Records on 13 January 1969 in the US and on 17 January in the UK. The album was issued in stereo only in the US, while the UK album was available in both stereo and mono, although the mono version is simply a fold-down (a combination of two stereo channels into one mono) rather than a specific mix. Since "All You Need Is Love" had been rush-released as a single, it did not have an official stereo mix. Although the track was released on the US LP Magical Mystery Tour, an official stereo mix of the track was not made until 29 October 1968 for the album. In the US, 8-track tape and cassette tape versions included "Lucy in the Sky with Diamonds", which was also heard in the film, as an additional song.

In contrast to the animated film, Yellow Submarine was not generally considered to be a significant release. Issued two months after The Beatles, it was one of the few Beatles releases that failed to top the charts in either the United Kingdom or the United States, peaking instead at number 3 and number 2, respectively. In Canada, Yellow Submarine topped the RPM national albums chart for two weeks, ending the White Album's 12-week run at number 1. On America's Billboard Top LPs chart, it was kept from the top by the same album.

=== Artwork ===
The artwork on the sleeve contains a drawing of the Beatles as it appeared on trailer posters, created by Heinz Edelman. The same basic design was used for the UK and US covers, though the UK jacket contains the words "Nothing Is Real" (taken from "Strawberry Fields Forever") just below the album's title, while the US version did not.

On the back of the cover, the UK album contained a review of the White Album written for The Observer by Tony Palmer. The review was introduced by a few liner notes by Apple press officer Derek Taylor. The US cover contained a fictitious illustrated biography by Dan Davis of Sgt. Pepper's Lonely Hearts Club Band, in which the ensemble's battle with the Blue Meanies was compared to three other epic struggles in the history of the English-speaking world: Beowulf's struggle to save the Heorot mead hall, King John's signing of Magna Carta and Thomas Jefferson's writing of the Declaration of Independence.

=== Unreleased EP ===
An EP containing the new songs had been considered for release in September 1968, but any plan to issue the soundtrack music from Yellow Submarine was then postponed to allow for the unveiling of The Beatles. Following the delayed release of the soundtrack album, however, Lewisohn writes that the Beatles were "mildly criticised" for issuing a new LP with just four new songs and having ceded a full LP side to Martin's music and thereby failing to provide their customary "excellent value-for-money". As a result, the band decided to reissue Yellow Submarine as a five-track mono EP, without the film score but including the then-unreleased "Across the Universe" as a bonus track. This EP was mastered in March 1969 but was never issued. The original running order for the EP was "Only a Northern Song", "Hey Bulldog" and "Across the Universe" on side one, with "All Together Now" and "It's All Too Much" on side two.

Lennon later dismissed Martin's contributions as "all this terrible shit" and blamed Brian Epstein, the Beatles' manager, for allowing Martin to participate in the project. According to author and music journalist Peter Doggett, neither the proposed EP format nor an expanded soundtrack album (containing other previously issued Beatles songs that appear in the 1968 film) was possible at the time, since "both options would have denied George Martin his contractual right to appear alongside the Beatles – and robbed him of potentially the largest royalty payment of his career."

=== Reissues ===
The first compact disc release of the album appeared in August 1987. It was consistent with the British version of the LP, with "Sea of Time" and "Sea of Holes" as separate tracks; the "Nothing Is Real" subtitle remained, and the review of the White Album with Taylor's introduction was reproduced inside the CD insert. The soundtrack album returned to the UK charts, peaking at number 60.

A 30th anniversary version of the album was released on 13 September 1999, coinciding with the remastered re-release of the film. Titled Yellow Submarine Songtrack, it does not include the George Martin film score, but features the six Beatles songs from the original album, along with an additional nine songs heard in the film, all completely remixed for this disc.

The original album remained available and was remastered and reissued, along with the rest of the Beatles' catalogue, on 9 September 2009. This release included both the UK and US sleeve notes. The mono mixes of the four songs that were intended for the unreleased EP (along with "Across the Universe") were released for the first time on the Mono Masters collection as part of the box set The Beatles in Mono.

== Critical reception ==
Professional ratings
Review scores
Source	Rating
AllMusic	3/5 stars
The A.V. Club	C−
Consequence of Sound	C+
Encyclopedia of Popular Music	2/5 stars
Music Story	3.5/5 stars
Pitchfork	6.2/10
Record Mirror	5/5 stars
The Rolling Stone Album Guide	2.5/5 stars

Recalling the album's release in a special-edition issue of Mojo magazine, Peter Doggett writes that "The papers got all trippy for Yellow Submarine". Beat Instrumental bemoaned the paucity of new material by the band, but added: "be not of bad cheer. The George Martin score to the film is really very nice, and two tracks by George Harrison redeem the first side. Both [songs] are superb pieces, considerably more enthralling than the most draggy All Together Now, a rather wet track." In a review for International Times, Barry Miles considered Martin's score "superbly produced" and, of the songs, wrote only of "It's All Too Much", which he described as, variously, "Endless, mantric, a round, interwoven, trellised, tessellated, filigreed, gidouiled, spiralling" and "Happy singalong music". Record Mirror's reviewer said that, given the longstanding demand for a soundtrack album, the release of Yellow Submarine would evoke "the ecstasy of fans the world over". The reviewer added that the four new Beatles songs matched the quality of the two "excellent" hit singles, and Martin's side represented a "tremendous achievement" that also justified any complaints about the price. Writing in their 1975 book The Beatles: An Illustrated Record, NME critics Roy Carr and Tony Tyler bemoaned the commercial considerations that had resulted in the release of a full soundtrack album, saying that the four new tracks "would have made a superb EP".

More recently, AllMusic critic Richie Unterberger has written of Yellow Submarine: "The album would have been far better value if it had been released as a four-song EP ... with the addition of a bonus track in 'Across the Universe' ... No one would argue that there's a huge amount more than meets the eye (or ear) there, but listening to the original album anew 40 years on, one is still struck by how mostly second-rate, and recycled and rejected Beatles material still sounds so good." Writing for Pitchfork Media, Mark Richardson opines that "the Yellow Submarine soundtrack is like the work of a supremely talented band that couldn't really be bothered" and describes "Hey Bulldog" as "a tough and funky piano-driven rocker, [and] by a good margin the best song here". Richardson concludes: "But as an album it's ultimately forgettable, which is something the Beatles so rarely were otherwise."

PopMatters' David Gassman views Martin's selections as "kind of twee and inconsequential" and the four new songs on side one as "fascinating", adding that "The material's tossed-off origins give it a character unlike any other Beatles album." While noting that the soundtrack was superseded by the 1999 release of Yellow Submarine Songtrack, Gassman writes: "No matter how you get them, though, the otherwise unavailable songs on this album ought to be part of any thinking Beatles fan's collection." Alex Young of Consequence of Sound writes: "as a whole, Yellow Submarine is a delightful album, even if it's still a less-than-acceptable inclusion in the Beatles canon", though he criticised the inclusion of Martin's score, which he felt should have been sold as a separate release.

== Track listing ==
All tracks are written by Lennon–McCartney, except for songs with asterisks, which are by George Harrison.

Side one: Songs from the film
No.	Title	Lead vocals	Length
1.	"Yellow Submarine"	Starr	2:39
2.	"Only a Northern Song" (*)	Harrison	3:24
3.	"All Together Now"	McCartney, with Lennon	2:11
4.	"Hey Bulldog"	Lennon, with McCartney	3:12
5.	"It's All Too Much" (*)	Harrison	6:26
6.	"All You Need Is Love"	Lennon	3:47
Total length:			21:39

All tracks are written by George Martin, except "Yellow Submarine in Pepperland", by Lennon–McCartney, arr. Martin.

Side two: Orchestral film score
No.	Title	Length
1.	"Pepperland"	2:18
2.	"Sea of Time"	3:00
3.	"Sea of Holes"	2:16
4.	"Sea of Monsters"	3:35
5.	"March of the Meanies"	2:16
6.	"Pepperland Laid Waste"	2:09
7.	"Yellow Submarine in Pepperland"	2:10
Total length:		17:44

== Personnel ==
The Beatles

- John Lennon – lead and backing vocals, rhythm and lead guitars, piano, harpsichord, glockenspiel, ukulele, harmonica, banjo, handclaps
- Paul McCartney – lead and backing vocals, bass guitar, acoustic guitar, double bass, trumpet, handclaps, percussion
- George Harrison – lead and backing vocals, lead and acoustic guitars, Hammond organ, percussion, handclaps, violin
- Ringo Starr – drums, percussion and handclaps, backing vocals, lead vocals on "Yellow Submarine"

Production

- George Martin – piano on "All You Need Is Love", orchestral arrangement

== Charts ==
Initial weekly chart performance
Chart (1969)	Peak
Australian Albums (Kent Music Report)	4
Canada Top Albums/CDs (RPM)	1
Finnish Albums (Suomen virallinen lista)	4
German Albums (Offizielle Top 100)	5
Norwegian Albums (VG-lista)	1
UK Albums (Official Charts)	3
US Billboard 200	2

Chart performance
Chart (1987–2021)	Peak
Belgian Albums (Ultratop Flanders)	91
Dutch Albums (Album Top 100)	33
Greece Albums (Billboard)	7
Italian Albums (Musica e dischi)	14
New Zealand Albums (RMNZ)	37
Portuguese Albums (AFP)	21
Spanish Albums (Promusicae)	97
Swedish Albums (Sverigetopplistan)	52
Swiss Albums (Schweizer Hitparade)	69

== Certifications and sales ==
Certifications and sales
Region	Certification	Certified units/sales
Argentina (CAPIF)	Platinum	60,000^{^}
Canada (Music Canada)	Gold	50,000^{^}
France (SNEP)	Diamond	500,000^{*}
Japan (RIAJ) 1999 release	Platinum	200,000^{^}
United Kingdom (BPI)	Gold	100,000^{^}
United States (RIAA)	Platinum	1,000,000^{^}
^{*} Sales figures based on certification alone.^{^} Shipments figures based on certification alone.

^{†} BPI certification awarded only for sales since 1994.

== See also ==
- Outline of the Beatles
- The Beatles timeline
- The Beatles albums discography
