= It's All Too Much =

- Cover of the Northern Songs sheet music

Song by the Beatles

from the album Yellow Submarine
- Released: 13 January 1969
- Recorded: 25–26 May and 2 June 1967
- Studio: De Lane Lea, London
- Genre: Psychedelia, acid rock
- Length: 6:26
- Label: Apple
- Songwriter: George Harrison
- Producer: George Martin

"It's All Too Much" is a song by the English rock band the Beatles from their 1969 album Yellow Submarine. Written by George Harrison in 1967, it conveys the ideological themes of that year's Summer of Love. The Beatles recorded the track in May 1967, a month after completing their album Sgt. Pepper's Lonely Hearts Club Band. It was one of four new songs they then supplied for the 1968 animated film Yellow Submarine, to meet their contractual obligations to United Artists.

Harrison wrote "It's All Too Much" as a celebration of his experiences with the hallucinogenic drug LSD, but following a visit to Haight-Ashbury in August 1967 he distanced himself from its usage. He later drew parallels between drug-induced "realisations" and his experiences with Transcendental Meditation. The song features a Hammond organ, which gives the track a drone-like quality typical of Indian music, electric guitar feedback, and an overdubbed brass section. Largely self-produced by the band, the recording displays an informal approach that contrasts with the discipline of the Beatles' previous work, particularly Sgt. Pepper. The song's sequence in the Yellow Submarine film has been recognised for its adventurousness in conveying a hallucinogenic experience.

Although several Beatles biographers dismiss the track as aimless, "It's All Too Much" has received praise from many other commentators. Peter Doggett considers it "one of the pinnacles of British acid-rock", while Rob Sheffield of Rolling Stone rates it among "the top five all-time psychedelic freakouts in rock history". Former Gong guitarist Steve Hillage adopted the song during his early years as a solo artist in the late 1970s. Journey, the House of Love, the Grateful Dead and the Church are among the other artists who have recorded or performed the track.

== Background and inspiration ==
[A]lthough it has a down side, I see my acid experience more as a blessing because it saved me many years of indifference. It was the awakening and the realisation that the important thing in life is to ask: "Who am I?", "Where am I going?" and "Where have I come from?"

— George Harrison, in The Beatles Anthology (2000)

"It's All Too Much" reflects George Harrison's experimentation with the hallucinogenic drug lysergic acid diethylamide, commonly known as LSD or "acid". Author Robert Rodriguez describes the track as "gloriously celebratory", with a lyric that conveys "his acid revelations in a childlike way". Rather than the song being purely drug-related, Harrison states in his 1980 autobiography, I, Me, Mine, that the "realisations" brought about by his LSD experiences were also applicable to meditation.

Together with his Beatles bandmate John Lennon and their wives, Harrison first took acid in March 1965. He likened the heightened awareness induced by the drug to "a light-bulb [going] on in my head" and "gaining hundreds of years of experience within twelve hours". In addition, he credited LSD as being the catalyst for his interest in Indian classical music, particularly the work of Ravi Shankar, and Eastern spirituality. By the time Harrison wrote "It's All Too Much", in 1967, the Indian sitar had temporarily replaced the guitar as his main musical instrument, as he received tuition from Shankar and one of the latter's protégés, Shambhu Das. As with his other songs from this period, however, such as "Within You Without You" and "Blue Jay Way", Harrison composed the melody on a keyboard instrument. In the case of "It's All Too Much", his use of Hammond organ allowed him to replicate the drone-like sound of the harmonium commonly heard in Indian vocal pieces.

Coinciding with the counterculture's preoccupation with enlightenment, 1967 marked the period when LSD use had become widespread among rock musicians and their audience. In a 1999 interview with Billboard magazine, Harrison said his aim had been "to write a rock'n'roll song about the whole psychedelic thing of the time".

== Composition and musical structure ==
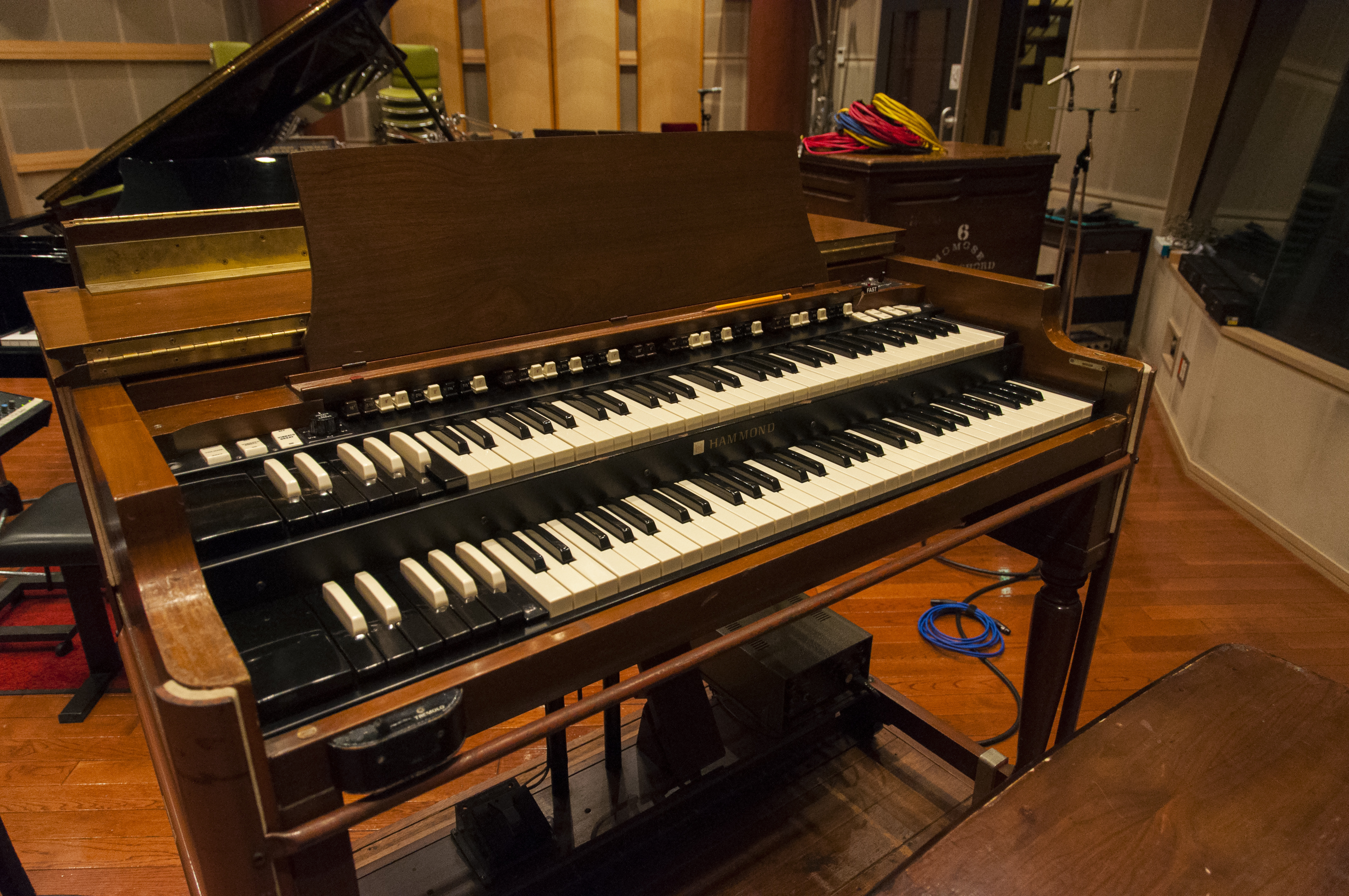
The Hammond B3 organ became Harrison's regular instrument for songwriting in 1967.

The song is in the key of G major and the time signature throughout is 4/4. The melody is restricted within a G pedal point, with a simple melodic emphasis on scale notes 2 (A) and 7 (F♯). As a defining characteristic of Indian classical music, such minimal harmonic movement features in many of Harrison's other Indian-style compositions, including "Within You Without You" and "Blue Jay Way".

Aside from the song's intro and extended ending (or coda), the composition is structured into three patterns of verse and chorus, with the second and third patterns separated by an instrumental section. The song originally contained a fourth verse–chorus combination, but this would be omitted from the officially released recording. Among musicologists discussing "It's All Too Much", Walter Everett describes it as a two-chord composition, whereas Alan Pollack contends that the song's sole chord is G major, although he concedes that transcribers may well list fleeting changes to C major over the choruses. In Pollack's opinion, these sections appear to employ IV (C major) and ii (A minor) chords yet, rather than formal changes, "it all boils down to neighbor tone motion in the inner voices superimposed on to the pedal tone of G in the bass".

AllMusic contributor Tom Maginnis writes that the lyrics "reflect the idealist optimism of the soon-to-be-labeled 'summer of love' and the kind of chemically enhanced mind-expanding euphoria that pervaded the new 'hippie' youth culture". Author Ian Inglis views Harrison's mention of "the love that's shining all around here" and "Floating down the stream of time" as especially reflective of the philosophy behind the Summer of Love, while theologian Dale Allison identifies the singer's "emerging religious worldview" in the first of those phrases. (Note: In November 2014, Harrison's official website used the lines "Floating down the stream of time / From life to life with me" (from verse two of the song) as its "Remembering George" message, thirteen years after his death.) Citing Harrison's comments that his awareness of God accompanied his first LSD experiences, music journalist Rob Chapman describes "It's All Too Much" as the composer's "most unrepentant acid song", yet also an example of his music "oscillating between the earthly and the elevated" and "as much an exercise in levity as levitation".

The song quotes a line from the Merseys' 1966 hit "Sorrow" – "With your long blonde hair and your eyes of blue" – a reference that has led some commentators to interpret "It's All Too Much" as a love song to Harrison's wife, Pattie Boyd, a blonde-haired former fashion model. At another point on the recording, the trumpets play part of Jeremiah Clarke's "Prince of Denmark's March". The Beatles' use of musical and lyrical quotations here pre-dates "All You Need Is Love", which was written by Lennon and recorded in June 1967 for the group's appearance on the Our World television broadcast. (Note: On "All You Need Is Love", the Beatles used portions of "La Marseillaise", "Greensleeves", a piece by Bach, and Glenn Miller's "In the Mood", in addition to quoting from their own songs.) While noting the similar ideological theme behind the two compositions, Inglis writes of Harrison and Lennon "presenting alternative accounts of the same subject" in the manner of French Impressionists such as Monet, Renoir and Manet, each of whom painted their own interpretations of sites in Paris and Argenteuil.

== Production ==
=== Recording ===
The Beatles began recording "It's All Too Much" on 25 May 1967 at De Lane Lea Studios, located on Kingsway in central London. With producer George Martin not in attendance that day, nor for the subsequent session, on the 26th, the band produced the recording themselves. The song had the working title of "Too Much", a phrase that journalist Robert Fontenot terms "beatnik vernacular for an experience that was exceptionally mindblowing". The group taped four takes of the basic track, the final version of which extended to over eight minutes, with Harrison playing Hammond organ, Lennon on lead guitar, Paul McCartney on bass, and Ringo Starr on drums. The following day, they added overdubs, comprising vocals, percussion and handclaps. In addition, according to authors Ian MacDonald and Kenneth Womack, Harrison also played lead guitar on the track.

George sang a couplet from "Sorrow" ... John and Paul's backing, meanwhile, started to waver a little, the chanted "too much" eventually becoming "tuba" and then "Cuba". It was that sort of a song.

— Beatles historian Mark Lewisohn, commenting on the relaxed and spontaneous approach to the recording

MacDonald characterises the 25–26 May sessions as "chaotic" and typical of the group's drug-inspired efforts after completing their album Sgt. Pepper's Lonely Hearts Club Band late the previous month. On the Sunday following the sessions for "It's All Too Much", the four Beatles attended a party at their manager Brian Epstein's house in Sussex, where Lennon and Harrison introduced music-industry publicist Derek Taylor to LSD. (Note: Speaking later to Beatles biographer Hunter Davies, Harrison said: "Once you'd had [acid], it was important that people close to you took it too.") The band returned to De Lane Lea on 2 June, with Martin now participating. That day, the trumpets and bass clarinet parts, played by four session musicians and conducted by Martin, were added to the track.

Maginnis describes the opening of the song as "a burst of howling guitar feedback and jubilant, church-like organ", adding: "The atmosphere hints at Harrison's fascination with Indian music and Hindu philosophy at the time, having a distinct, Eastern-flavored, droning undercurrent." (Note: Before the sound of the guitar, the recording begins with an interrupted cry from Lennon, which listeners identify as either "To your mother!" or "Sue your mother!") Following the intro to "I Feel Fine" in 1964, "It's All Too Much" is a rare example of the Beatles' use of feedback on a recording and suggests the influence of Jimi Hendrix. Womack credits this guitar part to Harrison, who played his Epiphone Casino using "the instrument's Bigsby [tremolo] bar in searing, full vibrato force". (Note: Everett credits Lennon for this guitar intro, however. In his 1999 Billboard interview, Harrison was unable to recall whether he played the opening feedback, but suggested that it might have been McCartney.) Harrison later rued the prominence of the brass accompaniment, saying: "To this day I am still annoyed that I let them mess it up with those damn trumpets. Basically, the song's quite good but, you know, messed up with those trumpets."

In the months following the recording sessions, Harrison swore off LSD usage after visiting the Haight-Ashbury district of San Francisco in August, with Boyd, Taylor and others. He said he found himself disillusioned at how, rather than an enlightened micro-society, Haight-Ashbury seemed to be a haven for dropouts and drug addicts. Harrison and Lennon subsequently became avid supporters of Maharishi Mahesh Yogi's Transcendental Meditation technique, after the Beatles had attended a seminar by the Maharishi in Bangor, Wales, in late August. (Note: While in Bangor, the group announced that they had given up taking hallucinogenic drugs – an about-turn after McCartney had caused controversy by publicly espousing the benefits of LSD in an interview with Life magazine, published in June.) MacDonald writes that, through Harrison's embrace of meditation, "It's All Too Much" served as his "farewell to acid".

=== Mixing ===
The Beatles carried out final mixing on "It's All Too Much", again at De Lane Lea, on 12 October 1967, while completing work on their Magical Mystery Tour EP. They considered the song for inclusion in their 1967 TV film Magical Mystery Tour. Instead, they selected it later that year for the soundtrack to the Yellow Submarine animated film, to meet their contractual obligations to supply United Artists with four new songs for the project. The version used in that 1968 film was a heavily edited version of the track, shortened to 2:22 through the inclusion of two of the original song's four verses and only the start of the long coda. (Note: Early in 1968, several months before the film's release, this edit began circulating among US radio stations, where it received airplay amid rumours that it was set to be the Beatles' next single.)

"It's All Too Much" was remixed for inclusion on the Yellow Submarine album on 16 October 1968. The vocals and handclaps were processed using automatic double tracking, so allowing these parts to be split across the stereo image. For this version, the song was edited down from the original eight minutes to a running time of 6:28, making it the longest officially released Beatles track written by Harrison. The edit was achieved by cutting a 35-second portion from around the three-minute mark, thereby removing the third chorus and the fourth verse (the last of which, beginning with the line "Time for me to look at you and you to look at me", had appeared in the film), and by fading out before the final minute of the coda. (Note: The full eight-minute "It's All Too Much" has appeared on several bootleg compilations but has yet to receive an official release.)

== Appearance in Yellow Submarine ==
A still from the sequence for "It's All Too Much"

Discussing the various underground influences in Yellow Submarine, author Stephen Glynn identifies the segment featuring "It's All Too Much" as being among the film's "most daring sequences". Led by art director Heinz Edelmann, the animation for the song reflects the influence of psychedelic artists such as Hapshash and the Coloured Coat, who in turn were inspired by the work of the nineteenth-century illustrator Aubrey Beardsley. Referring to London's UFO Club, for which the Hapshash team designed promotional posters, Glynn considers the scene to be a cinematic version of Unlimited Freak Out – "a 'happening' that sought to create a totalising mind-expanding environment involving music, light and people".

Michael Frontani, an associate professor of communications, writes that, although the counterculture's Summer of Love ideology had largely given way to New Left-inspired activism by mid 1968, the "countercultural ideal" represented by the Beatles "remained popular with the general audience", and he describes Yellow Submarine as "the purest, most arresting and most popular statement of that ideal". "It's All Too Much" appears during the climax of the film, following Lennon's defeat of the Chief Blue Meanie's enforcer, the Flying Glove, through the power of the word "Love". In Womack's description, in the sequence for the song, the Beatles "vanquish the evil Blue Meanies and celebrate as the colorful beauty of friendship and music have been restored to Pepperland". (Note: The Beatles had little involvement in the film's creation, leaving the production to King Features Syndicate, who drew heavily on the Sgt. Pepper concept.) Author George Case describes the same victory scene as "a psychotropic cartoon dreamscape" and an example of the Beatles' more overt allusions to the hallucinogenic experience. Speaking in 1999, Starr said of "It's All Too Much": "that's the [track] that really sets the mood of the movie ... that's where the music and the movie really gel."

The film represented the final episode in the Beatles' psychedelic period, although the band had already returned to making more roots-based music at the start of 1968. Referring to the drug-inspired imagery that led Rank to pull Yellow Submarine from its UK cinema run, Glynn writes: "Indeed, the imagery accompanying [Harrison's] 'Only a Northern Song' and 'It's All Too Much' only 'makes sense' when read as attempting an audio-visual recreation of the hallucinogenic state ..."

== Release and reception ==
An EP containing "It's All Too Much" and the three other new soundtrack songs had been scheduled for September 1968, but a full album was created instead. With the addition of the previously issued "Yellow Submarine" and "All You Need Is Love" to fill out side one of the LP, George Martin's orchestral pieces from the film made up the second side. Viewed as a secondary release beside the band's recently issued double LP, The Beatles, the Yellow Submarine album appeared in January 1969, six months after the film's London premiere. In January 1996, "It's All Too Much" (backed by "Only a Northern Song") was issued on a jukebox-only single, pressed on blue vinyl. That release was part of a series of Beatles jukebox singles issued by Capitol Records' CEMA Special Markets division. (Note: Coinciding with the DVD release of Yellow Submarine in 1999, "It's All Too Much" was remixed for inclusion on the film's expanded soundtrack album, Yellow Submarine Songtrack. With the Hammond organ given greater prominence in the mix, the song appeared as the last of the album's fifteen tracks.)

Recalling the release of Yellow Submarine in his 1977 book The Beatles Forever, Nicholas Schaffner described "It's All Too Much" as the only one of the new songs that appeared "to have taken more than a few hours to write". He added: "[its] highlights include some searing Velvet Underground feedback and an unusually witty epigram that just about sums up the Spirit of '67: 'Show me that I'm everywhere, and get me home for tea.'" Rodriguez recognises the timing of the song's release on its public perception. He comments that the recording was "positively anarchic" in mid-1967 but, by 1969, when it received widespread release, the song was "slightly less groundbreaking and a little more reactionary to the psychedelic movement that the band itself had helped popularize".

Among the contemporary reviews of the album, Beat Instrumental described "It's All Too Much" and "Only a Northern Song" as "superb pieces" that "redeem" side one. Record Mirror's reviewer said that it was the best-sounding track on Yellow Submarine, adding: "Beside the beauty of the organ, the absolute volume of it – even when the [record] player is turned down – is amazing. The song is basically of rock construction, but built around one endless note which trails behind." In his lengthy assessment of the track, Barry Miles of International Times wrote: "Endless, mantric, a round, interwoven, trellised, tessellated, filigreed, gidouiled, spiralling is It's All Too Much [–] George's Indian-timed, with drums fading-in-and-out, spurts of life to a decaying note, multi-level, handclapping number ... High treble notes flicker like moths around the top register. Happy singalong music." In his 1998 book The Beatles Diary, Miles praised it further as "the most striking piece of psychedelia The Beatles ever recorded" and concluded: "Discordant, off-beat and effortlessly brilliant, the song was (alongside 'Taxman') Harrison's finest piece of Western rock music to date."

== Retrospective assessments and legacy ==
From here, the accepted version of Beatles history has them flailing in Pepper's long shadow and succumbing to tripped-out wooliness. In Revolution in the Head, Ian MacDonald claims that their appetite for illicit substances had started to "loosen their judgement" ... And yet their new-found looseness made for some tremendous music, notably the frazzled fantasia of Harrison's "It's All Too Much".

— John Harris, 2007

Although Yellow Submarine has attained the status of a classic children's animated film, many Beatles biographers consider the band's post-Sgt. Pepper 1967 recordings to be substandard work. Among these authors, Mark Hertsgaard cites Martin's view that the soundtrack album was made up of "bottom of the barrel" material and dismisses "It's All Too Much" as "little more than formless shrieking". Ian MacDonald also holds the track in low regard, describing it as a "protracted exercise in drug-mesmerised G-pedal monotony". (Note: Similarly unimpressed, Walter Everett writes: "Martin need not have worried about 'A Day in the Life' being pretentious; it is tracks like ['It's All Too Much'] that are indeed too much.") Discussing the lyrics, particularly the line "Show me that I'm everywhere, and get me home for tea", MacDonald considers the song to be "the locus classicus of English psychedelia" and he comments that in Britain, unlike in America, "tradition, nature, and the child's-eye-view were the things which sprang most readily to the LSD-heightened Anglo-Saxon mind."

Writing for Rolling Stone in 2002, Greg Kot admired the song, saying: "once again, a raga-flavored groove brings out Harrison's best in the walloping 'It's All Too Much.'" That same year, Nigel Williamson of Uncut described it as "a psychedelic classic" that, had it been recorded earlier in 1967, "would have made Sgt Pepper an even better album". In the 2004 edition of The Rolling Stone Album Guide, Rob Sheffield wrote: "Yellow Submarine was a flat soundtrack rather than a real album, but here's a question: Why is George's 'It's All Too Much' not heralded as one of the top five all-time psychedelic freakouts in rock history?" Sheffield features the track in his 2017 book Dreaming the Beatles, where he refers to it as "the great lost Beatle song – the one that deserves to be infinitely more famous than it is", adding: "It's where they really nailed the Sgt. Pepper sound – that combination of acid-rock momentum and brass-band frippery. 'It's All Too Much' would have been the second or third best song on Sgt. Pepper ..." (Note: While identifying it as Harrison's "psychedelic love song" to Boyd, Sheffield also views "It's All Too Much" as "the greatest song she ever coaxed into being" and a rare example of the Beatles jamming effectively in the studio.) Richie Unterberger of AllMusic similarly considers Yellow Submarine to be "inessential" and describes the track as "the jewel of the new songs ... resplendent in swirling [organ], larger-than-life percussion, and tidal waves of feedback guitar" and "a virtuoso excursion into otherwise hazy psychedelia".

In Mojo's The Beatles' Final Years Special Edition (2003), Peter Doggett acknowledged the comparative rarity of "It's All Too Much" within the Beatles canon and added: "Yet it's one of the pinnacles of British acid-rock, its sleepwalking rhythm retaining a bizarrely contemporary feel today." Having included the track in his 2011 list of Harrison's "10 Greatest Beatles Songs", Joe Bosso of MusicRadar commented: "At times the song seems to drift away with Harrison's dreamy verses, but just as quickly it's chopping down trees with explosive percussion and thunderous handclaps. Wild guitar breaks by both Harrison and John Lennon help to make It's All Too Much a dizzying treat." In his book Psychedelia and Other Colours, Rob Chapman writes that further to the devotional and exotic "Within You Without You", "It's All Too Much" blends "physical love, ego loss and spiritual oneness as well as any song the Beatles recorded during their psychedelic phase". (Note: Chapman also says that, with its line "Show me that I've everywhere, and get me home for tea", the song offers "the best evocation of the transience of the LSD trip that anyone ever wrote".)

The song featured in Mojo's 1997 list "Psychedelia: The 100 Greatest Classics", where Jon Savage described it as an "aural pleasure" that included "mad brass and handclaps so luscious that they sound like the chewing of a thousand cows". In July 2001, Uncut placed the song at number 43 on its list of "The 50 Greatest Beatles Tracks". Five years later, Mojo ranked it 85th on the magazine's list of "The 101 Greatest Beatles Songs". The editors credited "It's All Too Much" with inspiring the Krautrock genre, while Primal Scream singer Bobby Gillespie described it as "a great piece of music" that, in departing from the Beatles' more regimented approach, evokes "the same feeling you get in 'Be-Bop-A-Lula' or a Muddy Waters or John Lee Hooker tune". Writing for the website Ultimate Classic Rock, Dave Swanson considers "It's All Too Much" to be "one of the band's most captivating works from the psychedelic era, and one of the Beatles' great lost songs". In 2012, it was included on the iTunes compilation album Tomorrow Never Knows, which the band's website described as a collection of "the Beatles' most influential rock songs". In 2018, the music staff of Time Out London ranked it at number 31 on their list of the best Beatles songs.

== Cover versions ==
=== Steve Hillage ===
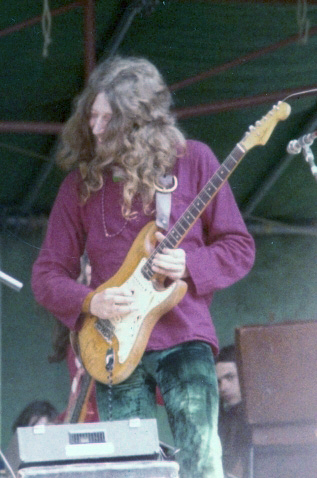
Steve Hillage (pictured in 1974) recorded the song for his album L and has often played it in concert.

Former Gong guitarist Steve Hillage recorded "It's All Too Much" for his 1976 solo album, L – a version that Unterberger highlights as "a dazzling cover" and Williamson terms "stunning". Produced by Todd Rundgren, the recording was also issued as a single.

In October 1976, Phil Sutcliffe of Sounds magazine described Hillage's adoption of both "It's All Too Much" and Donovan's "Hurdy Gurdy Man" as the "policy statements" for his solo career. Speaking to Trouser Press that same month, Hillage said he was drawn to the Beatles song because of its positive message, but especially its success in conveying joy without resorting to escapism. (Note: Hillage concluded: "[If] people can see all the horror and the sickness of the world and still be joyful because it's the only way to alleviate it, well then 'It's All Too Much' is a great superecstatic rock song.")

Hillage included "It's All Too Much" in his concert performances; live versions from the late 1970s appear on his albums Live Herald (1979), BBC Radio 1 Live (1992) and Rainbow 1977 (2014). Reviewing BBC Radio 1 Live for AllMusic, Chris Nickson writes that Hillage's reading "not only heightens the Eastern-flavored psychedelia, but lets [the guitarist] unleash some of his most scorching axe work yet, tearing into the song like a starving man given a five-course meal".

=== Other artists ===
Journey also issued a recording of the song in 1976, on their album Look into the Future. Besides the late 1970s renditions, according to Miles, the Beatles' "It's All Too Much" "won fresh acclaim from a later wave of acid-rock adventurers" during the early 1990s. The House of Love released a cover of the song as the B-side to "Feel", the first single from their 1992 album Babe Rainbow. The previous year, Loves Young Nightmare recorded it (as "All Too Much") for Revolution No. 9: A Tribute to The Beatles in Aid of Cambodia, a multi-artist compilation supplied with Revolver magazine; the album was reissued in the United States in 1997, following the popularity there of Britpop bands such as Oasis. (Note: At their UK shows in April and May 1995, Oasis played the Beatles' recordings of "It's All Too Much" and "Hey Bulldog" through the concert PA before coming on stage.) The Church included the track on their 1999 covers album A Box of Birds.

"It's All Too Much" has been performed live by the Grateful Dead, by the latter's associated acts Ratdog and Phil Lesh and Friends, and by Yonder Mountain String Band. Other artists who have recorded the song include All About Eve, Paul Gilbert, the Violet Burning, Yukihiro Takahashi, and Rich Robinson. A version by former MC5 guitarist Wayne Kramer appeared on the 2003 Harrison tribute album Songs from the Material World. My Darling Clementine recorded "It's All Too Much" for Yellow Submarine Resurfaces, a multi-artist CD accompanying the July 2012 issue of Mojo.

Experimental musician Greg Davis and jazz singer-songwriter Chris Weisman recorded the track for their 2010 album Northern Songs, a project that The Village Voice described as blending "Beatlefolk" with "gongs, field recordings, and generally orchestrated nirvana". The Flaming Lips performed "It's All Too Much" at the George Fest tribute concert in September 2014, with special guest Gingger Shankar playing violin. Consequence of Sound's reviewer described it as "the most sonically pleasing song of the night".

== Personnel ==
According to Ian MacDonald and Kenneth Womack:

The Beatles

- George Harrison – lead vocal, Hammond organ, lead guitar, backing vocal, handclaps
- John Lennon – harmony vocal, lead guitar, handclaps
- Paul McCartney – harmony vocal, bass guitar, cowbell, handclaps
- Ringo Starr – drums, tambourine

Additional musicians

- David Mason and three uncredited session players – trumpets
- Paul Harvey – bass clarinet

== Sources ==
- Allison, Dale C. Jr (2006). The Love There That's Sleeping: The Art and Spirituality of George Harrison. New York, NY: Continuum. ISBN 978-0-8264-1917-0.
- Badman, Keith (2001). The Beatles Diary Volume 2: After the Break-Up 1970–2001. London: Omnibus Press. ISBN 978-0-7119-8307-6.
- Bagirov, Alex (2008). The Anthology of the Beatles Records. Rostock: Something Books. ISBN 978-3-936300-44-4.
- The Beatles (2000). The Beatles Anthology. San Francisco, CA: Chronicle Books. ISBN 0-8118-2684-8.
- Brackett, Nathan; Hoard, Christian, eds. (2004). The New Rolling Stone Album Guide (4th edn). New York, NY: Fireside/Simon & Schuster. ISBN 0-7432-0169-8.
- Case, George (2010). Out of Our Heads: Rock 'n' Roll Before the Drugs Wore Off. Milwaukee, WI: Backbeat Books. ISBN 978-0-87930-967-1.
- Castleman, Harry; Podrazik, Walter J. (1976). All Together Now: The First Complete Beatles Discography 1961–1975. New York, NY: Ballantine Books. ISBN 0-345-25680-8.
- Chapman, Rob (2015). Psychedelia and Other Colours. London: Faber & Faber. ISBN 978-0-571-28200-5.
- Clayson, Alan (2003). George Harrison. London: Sanctuary. ISBN 1-86074-489-3.
- Collis, Clark (October 1999). "Fantastic Voyage". Mojo. pp. 50–58.
- Doggett, Peter (2003). "Yellow Submarine: Underwater Treasure". Mojo Special Limited Edition: 1000 Days of Revolution (The Beatles' Final Years – Jan 1, 1968 to Sept 27, 1970). London: Emap. pp. 76–79.
- Doggett, Peter (2007). There's a Riot Going On: Revolutionaries, Rock Stars, and the Rise and Fall of '60s Counter-Culture. Edinburgh, UK: Canongate Books. ISBN 978-1-84195-940-5.
- The Editors of Rolling Stone (2002). Harrison. New York, NY: Rolling Stone Press. ISBN 978-0-7432-3581-5.
- Everett, Walter (1999). The Beatles as Musicians: Revolver Through the Anthology. New York, NY: Oxford University Press. ISBN 978-0-19-512941-0.
- Frontani, Michael R. (2007). The Beatles: Image and the Media. Jackson, MS: University Press of Mississippi. ISBN 978-1-57806-966-8.
- Glynn, Stephen (2013). The British Pop Music Film: The Beatles and Beyond. Basingstoke, UK: Palgrave Macmillan. ISBN 978-0-230-39222-9.
- Harrison, George (2002) [1980]. I, Me, Mine. San Francisco, CA: Chronicle Books. ISBN 978-0-8118-5900-4.
- Harry, Bill (2003). The George Harrison Encyclopedia. London: Virgin Books. ISBN 978-0-7535-0822-0.
- Hertsgaard, Mark (1996). A Day in the Life: The Music and Artistry of the Beatles. London: Pan Books. ISBN 0-330-33891-9.
- Hodgson, Jay (2010). Understanding Records: A Field Guide to Recording Practice. New York, NY: Continuum. ISBN 978-1-4411-5607-5.
- Ingham, Chris (2006). The Rough Guide to the Beatles (2nd edn). London: Rough Guides/Penguin. ISBN 978-1-84836-525-4.
- Inglis, Ian (2009). "Revolution". In Womack, Kenneth (ed.). The Cambridge Companion to the Beatles. Cambridge, UK: Cambridge University Press. ISBN 978-0-521-68976-2.
- Inglis, Ian (2010). The Words and Music of George Harrison. Santa Barbara, CA: Praeger. ISBN 978-0-313-37532-3.
- Kahn, Ashley (2020). George Harrison on George Harrison: Interviews and Encounters. Chicago, IL: Chicago Review Press. ISBN 978-1-64160-051-4.
- Lavezzoli, Peter (2006). The Dawn of Indian Music in the West. New York, NY: Continuum. ISBN 0-8264-2819-3.
- Leng, Simon (2006). While My Guitar Gently Weeps: The Music of George Harrison. Milwaukee, WI: Hal Leonard. ISBN 978-1-4234-0609-9.
- Lewisohn, Mark (2005) [1988]. The Complete Beatles Recording Sessions: The Official Story of the Abbey Road Years 1962–1970. London: Bounty Books. ISBN 978-0-7537-2545-0.
- MacDonald, Ian (1998). Revolution in the Head: The Beatles' Records and the Sixties. London: Pimlico. ISBN 978-0-7126-6697-8.
- Miles, Barry (2001). The Beatles Diary Volume 1: The Beatles Years. London: Omnibus Press. ISBN 0-7119-8308-9.
- Roberts, Andy (2012). Albion Dreaming: A popular history of LSD in Britain (rev. edn). Singapore: Marshall Cavendish International. ISBN 978-981-4382-16-8.
- Rodriguez, Robert (2012). Revolver: How the Beatles Reimagined Rock 'n' Roll. Milwaukee, WI: Backbeat Books. ISBN 978-1-61713-009-0.
- Schaffner, Nicholas (1978). The Beatles Forever. New York, NY: McGraw-Hill. ISBN 0-07-055087-5.
- Shea, Stuart; Rodriguez, Robert (2007). Fab Four FAQ: Everything Left to Know About the Beatles ... and More!. New York, NY: Hal Leonard. ISBN 978-1-4234-2138-2.
- Sheffield, Rob (2017). Dreaming the Beatles: The Love Story of One Band and the Whole World. New York, NY: HarperCollins. ISBN 978-0-06-220765-4.
- Sounes, Howard (2010). Fab: An Intimate Life of Paul McCartney. London: HarperCollins. ISBN 978-0-00-723705-0.
- Tillery, Gary (2011). Working Class Mystic: A Spiritual Biography of George Harrison. Wheaton, IL: Quest Books. ISBN 978-0-8356-0900-5.
- Winn, John C. (2009). That Magic Feeling: The Beatles' Recorded Legacy, Volume Two, 1966–1970. New York, NY: Three Rivers Press. ISBN 978-0-307-45239-9.
- Womack, Kenneth (2007). Long and Winding Roads: The Evolving Artistry of the Beatles. New York, NY: Continuum. ISBN 978-0-8264-1746-6.
- Womack, Kenneth (2014). The Beatles Encyclopedia: Everything Fab Four. Santa Barbara, CA: ABC-CLIO. ISBN 978-0-313-39171-2.
