= Hey Bulldog =

1969 song by the Beatles

- Cover of the Northern Songs sheet music (licensed to Sonora Musikförlag)

Song by the Beatles

from the album Yellow Submarine
- Released: 13 January 1969
- Recorded: 11 February 1968
- Studio: EMI, London
- Genre: Hard rock; psychedelic rock; pop rock; acid rock; blues rock
- Length: 3:09
- Label: Apple
- Songwriter: Lennon–McCartney
- Producer: George Martin

Promotional video
- "Hey Bulldog" on YouTube

"Hey Bulldog" is a song by the English rock band the Beatles from their 1969 soundtrack album, Yellow Submarine. Credited to Lennon–McCartney, it was written by John Lennon under the working title "Hey Bullfrog" after a request for more songs for the film Yellow Submarine (1968). The style is often described as a hard rock, psychedelic rock, pop rock, blues rock, and acid rock song.

The song was recorded on 11 February 1968 at EMI Studios in London. While initially scheduled to film a promotional video for "Lady Madonna", the band chose to record "Hey Bulldog" instead. The recording was finished in ten takes within ten hours. Mono mixing was used during recording, and stereo mixing was done on 29 October 1968. The "Hey Bulldog" session marked the first time that Yoko Ono, Lennon's future wife, was present.

"Hey Bulldog" was released on 13 January 1969 in the United States and 17 January in the United Kingdom, appearing on Yellow Submarine, the soundtrack album for the film. It received positive reviews from critics, with many praising its composition and its musical structure. In 2018, Time Out magazine ranked "Hey Bulldog" as number 27 on their list of the best Beatles songs, and Rolling Stone categorized it as the 81st-greatest Beatles song in 2020. In 2014, it was covered by the American musician Dave Grohl and English musician Jeff Lynne as part of the 56th Annual Grammy Awards.

== Background and composition ==
While working on the 1968 film Yellow Submarine, the Beatles were asked to compose songs for the film's soundtrack. John Lennon, after being requested by United Artists that they write another song for the film, began constructing a song titled "Hey Bullfrog", which was the last song they licensed for use in Yellow Submarine. Upon working on it, he showed it to Paul McCartney, who helped write the lyrics and develop the song further. Credited to Lennon–McCartney, it was demoed between late 1967 and 1968 at Lennon's Kenwood estate in Weybridge. The recordings include the melody that later became the song's chorus, as well as a section working out the "she can talk to me" passage. McCartney later recalled: "I remember 'Hey Bulldog' as being one of John's songs and I helped him finish it off in the studio, but it's mainly his vibe."

"Hey Bulldog" is a hard rock, psychedelic rock, pop rock, blues rock, and acid rock song; with a length of three minutes and nine seconds. The song uses a 4/4 time signature and employs a shifting key, switching between B major, A major and B minor. The opening piano riff is played in octaves, before being doubled in a higher register by two guitars and a lower bass register. The song includes two bridges and two middle verses, with the bridge closer in style to a refrain. The introductory riff repeats throughout the song, appearing at the end of the refrain and the outro, as well as further influencing the refrain. The piano riff has been compared to their cover of Barrett Strong's song "Money (That's What I Want)".

== Recording ==
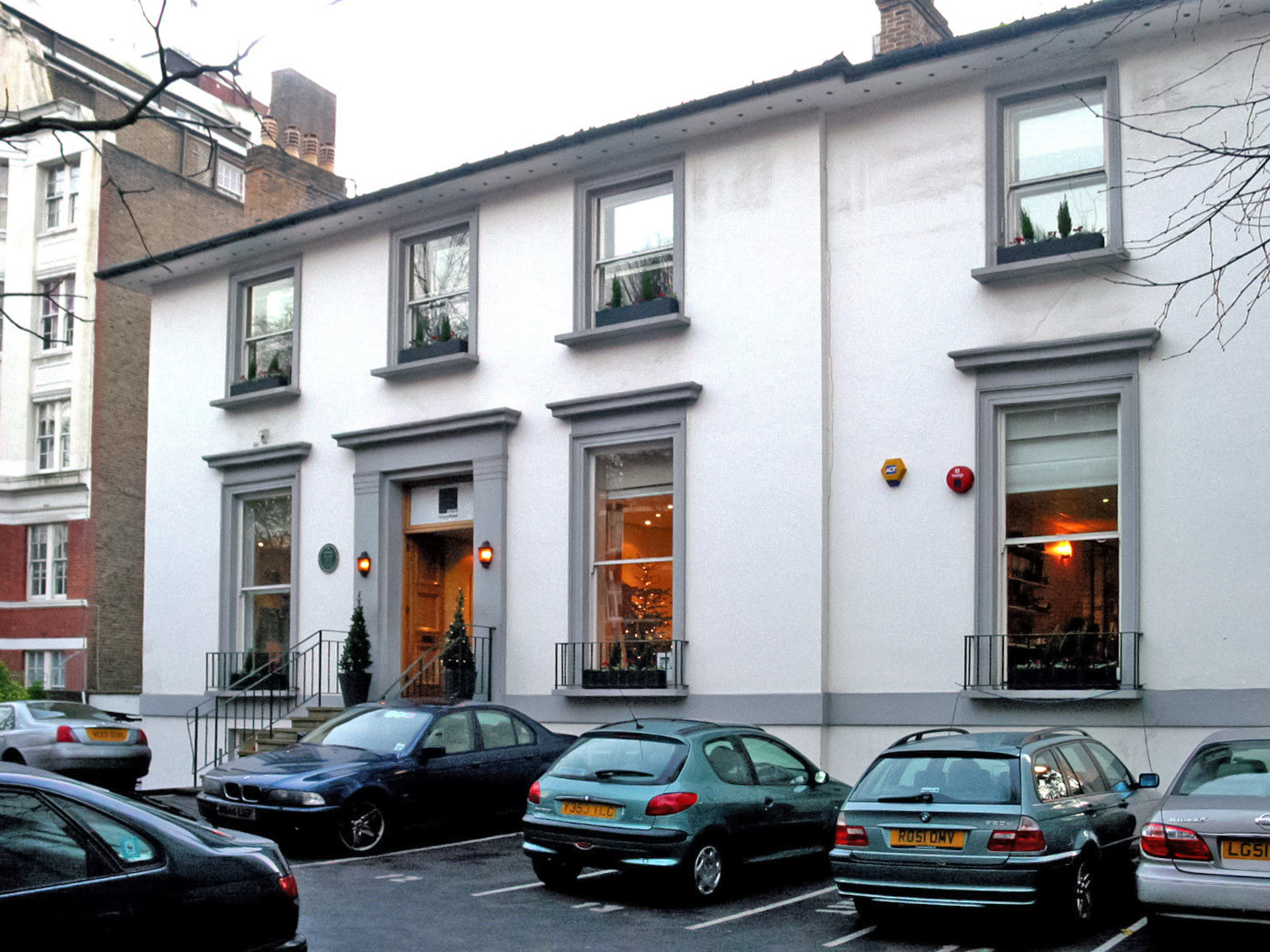
Abbey Road Studios (formerly EMI Studios) in 2005, where "Hey Bulldog" was recorded

On 11 February 1968, the Beatles went into EMI Studio Three to shoot a promotional film for their single "Lady Madonna", but instead spent the session recording "Hey Bulldog". The camera crew remained in the studio with the band as they recorded the basic track, featuring piano, drums, tambourine, bass guitar, and rhythm guitar. Lennon suggested the group record "Hey Bulldog", with the intention of it being a part of the soundtrack for Yellow Submarine. The song was produced by George Martin and engineered by Geoff Emerick. It was recorded in ten takes over the course of ten hours. The group later settled on the tenth take, overdubbing and adding more drums, bass, guitar parts, lead and backing vocals. The line-up on the basic track features Harrison on rhythm guitar, Lennon on piano, McCartney on tambourine and Starr on drums. This was also the first recording session that Lennon's wife, Yoko Ono, was present.

As the group neared the end of the basic track for "Hey Bulldog", McCartney attempted to make Lennon laugh by barking like a dog. Author John C. Winn claims that McCartney's dog barking was inspired by Paul Jones's song "The Dog Presides". It was then that Lennon had renamed the song to "Hey Bulldog". After the group had settled on the tenth take, the camera crew left as they continued working on the song. Borrowing George Harrison's Gibson SG, Lennon recorded a lead guitar solo. (Note: Among Beatles writers and musicologists, Walter Everett, Ian MacDonald and Winn write Lennon performed the song's guitar solo. In his 2006 memoir Here, There and Everywhere, Emerick instead recalls Harrison as having performed the solo, writing: "Harrison's solo was sparkling ... one of the few times that he nailed it right away. His amp was turned up really loud, and he used one of his new fuzz boxes, which made his guitar absolutely scream.") After the band finished adding overdubs, Martin and Emerick mixed the song for mono twice. While the Beatles would often ad lib offhandedly at the end of recordings, Martin and Emerick decided to leave the dog barks, shouts and screams in the final recording, adding heavy compression to some of Lennon's dialogue and dog noises. Stereo mixing was done by Emerick on 29 October 1968. Lennon suggested that "Hey Bulldog" be the A-side single for "Lady Madonna" due to how well it turned out, however, McCartney was against the idea. "Hey Bulldog" was the last song the group recorded before traveling to India in mid-February.

== Release ==
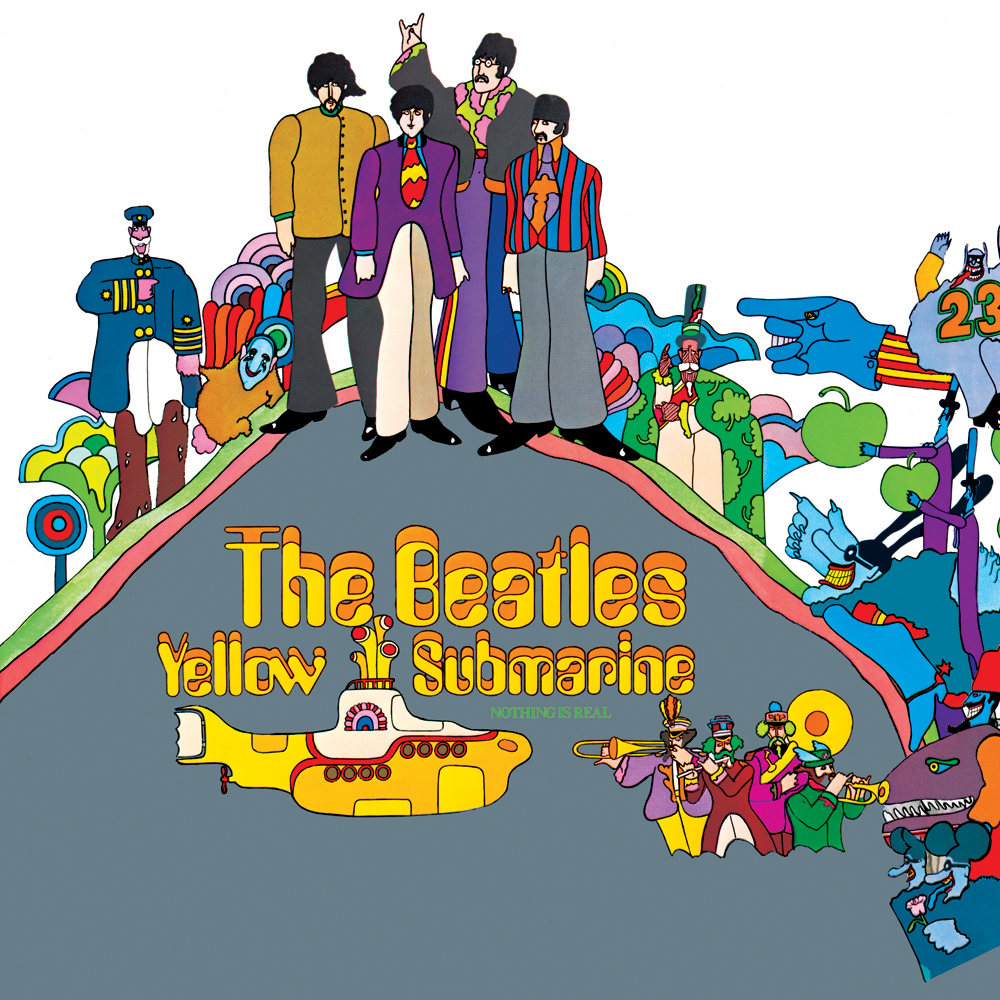
"Hey Bulldog" was first released on Yellow Submarine.

Apple Records released Yellow Submarine on 13 January 1969 in the United States, and on 17 January in the United Kingdom. "Hey Bulldog" was sequenced as the fourth track on the album, appearing alongside five other songs on side one of Yellow Submarine; it was placed between "All Together Now" and Harrison's "It's All Too Much". The promotional film for "Hey Bulldog", directed by Tony Bramwell, was aired on Top of the Pops on 14 March 1968. "Hey Bulldog" was included in the Yellow Submarine film, however, the scene in which it appears in is not included in the original American release, due to producer Al Brodax feeling that it ran "too long", although it does appear in the 1999 re-release edition. "Hey Bulldog" was also featured on the 1976 compilation album Rock 'n' Roll Music and was subsequently included on the Yellow Submarine Songtrack (1999) and the 2009 compilation Mono Masters. "Hey Bulldog" was also considered to appear on an extended play (EP) set to be released in September 1968, sequenced between "Only a Northern Song" and "Across the Universe"; however, the EP was never released. An instrumental version of the fourth take was released on Anthology 4 (2025).

== Critical reception ==
"Hey Bulldog" received positive reviews from music critics, with many praising its composition and highlighting it as a standout track from Yellow Submarine. Tom Maginnis of AllMusic described "Hey Bulldog" as a "strong one" and agrees that it should have been released as an A-side instead of "Lady Madonna". Alan W. Pollack considered "Hey Bulldog" to be the "most substantive and significant of the four new songs recorded for 'Yellow Submarine'" in terms of composition and musical structure. Writing for Pitchfork, Mark Richardson described "Hey Bulldog" as "a tough and funky piano-driven rocker, [and] by a good margin the best song [on Yellow Submarine]". Barry Miles claimed that "Hey Bulldog" became a "minor classic" due to Lennon's raw vocals. Emerick, in his book Here, There and Everywhere: My Life Recording the Music of The Beatles (2006), praised Paul's bass playing on the song, calling it "the most inventive of any he'd done since Pepper".

To me, it's a quintessential Beatles rocker.

— Dave Grohl on "Hey Bulldog"

"Hey Bulldog" was featured on the 2012 compilation Tomorrow Never Knows, which the official Beatles website described as a collection of their "most influential rock songs". Musicians Dave Grohl and Jeff Lynne performed a cover of it as part of the 56th Annual Grammy Awards on 27 January 2014. Grohl has also stated it is his favourite Beatles song. Mark Beaumont of NME placed it at number 87 out of 188 on a list of every Beatles song ranked, calling it a "masterclass in rock dynamism and melodic tension". Music critic Jim Bevigila named "Hey Bulldog" the 84th-best Beatles song in his book Counting Down The Beatles: Their 100 Finest Songs (2017). Music journalist Michael Gallucci listed "Hey Bulldog" as the 59th-best Beatles song in his ranking of their discography, and Bill Wyman of Vulture ranked it at number 89 out of 214 in his ranking. In 2018, the music staff of Time Out ranked "Hey Bulldog" at number 27 on their list of the best Beatles songs, calling it "a grinding nonsensical love song driven by a killer riff" and also praising McCartney and Ringo Starr's contributions to the song. Rolling Stone named it the 81st-greatest Beatles song in 2020.

== Personnel ==
According to Ian MacDonald:

- George Harrison – rhythm guitar
- John Lennon – double tracked vocals, piano, lead guitar
- Paul McCartney – harmony vocal, bass, tambourine
- Ringo Starr – drums, tambourine
