= Yellow Submarine Songtrack =

1999 soundtrack album by the Beatles

Soundtrack album and compilation album by the Beatles
- Released: 13 September 1999
- Recorded: 21 October 1965 – 11 February 1968
- Studios: EMI, Olympic and De Lane Lea studios, London
- Genre: Psychedelic rock
- Length: 45:31
- Labels: Apple, Capitol, EMI
- Producer: George Martin

The Beatles chronology
| Anthology 3 (1996) | Yellow Submarine Songtrack (1999) | 1 (2000) |

Professional ratings
Review scores
| Source | Rating |
|---|---|
| AllMusic | 3/5 stars |
| Blender | 3/5 stars |
| The Encyclopedia of Popular Music | 4/5 stars |
| Entertainment Weekly | B+ |
| Goldmine | 5/5 stars |
| Mojo | (favourable) |
| Q | 4/5 stars |
| Rolling Stone | 3.5/5 stars |
| Wall of Sound | 95/100 |

Yellow Submarine Songtrack is a compilation and soundtrack album by the English rock band the Beatles, released in 1999 to coincide with a re-release of the 1968 animated film Yellow Submarine that same year. The film was re-released on 13 September 1999 in the United Kingdom and the following day in the United States. In contrast with other Beatles remasters available, the songs were fully remixed by Peter Cobbin at Abbey Road Studios from the original multitrack tapes, something not done for the original CD release of the Beatles catalogue in the late 1980s (except for Help! and Rubber Soul), nor the 2009 remastered albums.

Yellow Submarine Songtrack removes the seven songs composed and orchestrated by George Martin that were included on the original 1969 Yellow Submarine and replaces them with all but one of the Beatles songs featured in the film that were not included on the original album—EMI chose to exclude "A Day in the Life" from the Songtrack in order to limit the number of songs featured from Sgt. Pepper's Lonely Hearts Club Band, while Martin's complete score was included as a DVD audio track on the CD/DVD package featuring the album and film.

The album debuted in the UK charts at number 8, selling 19,000 copies in its first week. It also peaked at number 15 on the Billboard 200, with 68,000 copies sold in its opening week. In France the album debuted at number 13.

Yellow Submarine Songtrack was reissued on CD on 4 June 2012 (5 June in North America) along with the film restored for DVD and Blu-ray release. While the original 1999 release was in a jewel-case, the 2012 version was released in a card sleeve, with the booklet and catalog numbers the same as the earlier version, with a 1999 copyright date on the disc, and a 2012 date on the card sleeve. The sleeve was in the same format as the Beatles 2009 remasters, being slightly rectangular with "The Beatles" logo in the left hand side of the cover.

== Structure ==
The remixed tracks of the album feature many alterations and adjustments from the original stereo recordings.

The title track, "Yellow Submarine", contains the line "a life of ease" (delivered by John Lennon) that had been missing in prior stereo mixes of the song. The replies from Lennon to the main lyric are gradually panned and faded from the right side of the stereo field to the left. The sound effects in this version are also more pronounced.

"Hey Bulldog" was entirely recorded on only one four-track tape. The piano and drum performances were recorded together onto one track and were inseparable for a new mix. They remain on the left audio channel while the vocals and the snare overdubs performed by drummer Ringo Starr are centred.

The prior stereo version of "Love You To", featuring lead vocals by George Harrison, contains a shorter fade than the initial mono recording. This shortening is retained in the Songtrack version.

Acoustic guitars and percussion are situated at the left channel for the new mix of "All Together Now". The lead vocals, by Lennon and Paul McCartney, are centred while the chorus is split across the left and right. The background vocals heard on the second verse are more audible and the guitar is clearer.

The Songtrack version of "Only a Northern Song" marked the appearance of the song for the first time in true stereo. The original 1969 stereo album featured a synthesised Duophonic variant of the original mono version. A stereo mix of this song also appeared on the Anthology 2 compilation album, but was made up of alternative takes featuring different overdubs and lyrics.

== Additional promotion ==
A number of promotions were launched to accompany the re-release of Yellow Submarine film and the remixed Songtrack in 1999. These include a commemorative postage stamp series, action figures of the main characters and a variety of assorted Yellow Submarine merchandise, such as mousepads. Additionally, an 18-coach, London-to-Paris Eurostar train was repainted with Yellow Submarine designs; the relivery, which cost over $160,000, was paid for by McCartney, Harrison and Starr. In addition, a life-size yellow submarine was taken out on a publicity tour across the globe.

== Track listing ==
All songs written by Lennon–McCartney, except for tracks with asterisks, which are written by George Harrison.

Side one
| No. | Title | Lead vocals | Length |
|---|---|---|---|
| 1. | "Yellow Submarine" | Starr | 2:39 |
| 2. | "Hey Bulldog" | Lennon | 3:12 |
| 3. | "Eleanor Rigby" | McCartney | 2:06 |
| 4. | "Love You To" (*) | Harrison | 2:58 |
| 5. | "All Together Now" | McCartney with Lennon | 2:11 |
| 6. | "Lucy in the Sky with Diamonds" | Lennon | 3:28 |
| 7. | "Think for Yourself" (*) | Harrison | 2:19 |
| 8. | "Sgt. Pepper's Lonely Hearts Club Band" | McCartney, with Lennon and Harrison | 2:03 |
| 9. | "With a Little Help from My Friends" | Starr | 2:44 |

Side two
| No. | Title | Lead vocals | Length |
|---|---|---|---|
| 10. | "Baby, You're a Rich Man" | Lennon | 3:01 |
| 11. | "Only a Northern Song" (*) | Harrison | 3:24 |
| 12. | "All You Need Is Love" | Lennon | 3:47 |
| 13. | "When I'm Sixty-Four" | McCartney | 2:37 |
| 14. | "Nowhere Man" | Lennon, with McCartney and Harrison | 2:43 |
| 15. | "It's All Too Much" (*) | Harrison | 6:26 |
| Total length: | | | 45:31 |

The CD/DVD package contains the album, as well as a DVD of the film with a remixed and remastered soundtrack, the original 1968 mono film soundtrack, and an isolated track of George Martin's complete score.

This album was also available on a yellow vinyl LP, with tracks 1–9 on side one and 10–15 on side two.

== Charts ==
=== Weekly charts ===
| Chart (1999) | Position |
|---|---|
| Austrian Albums Chart | 8 |
| Belgian Albums Chart (Flanders) | 19 |
| Belgian Albums Chart (Wallonia) | 9 |
| Canadian RPM Albums Chart | 12 |
| Dutch Albums Chart | 45 |
| French SNEP Albums Chart | 31 |
| German Media Control Albums Chart | 11 |
| Japanese Oricon Albums Chart | 6 |
| Norwegian Albums Chart | 26 |
| Swedish Albums Chart | 22 |
| Swiss Albums Chart | 23 |
| UK Albums Chart | 8 |
| US Billboard 200 | 15 |

=== Year-end charts ===
| Chart (1999) | Position |
|---|---|
| Japanese Albums Chart | 121 |

=== Certifications ===
Certifications for Yellow Submarine Songtrack
| Region | Certification | Certified units/sales |
|---|---|---|
| Japan (RIAJ) | Platinum | 177,000 |
| United Kingdom (BPI) | Gold | 100,000^{^} |
| United States (RIAA) | Gold | 500,000^{^} |
^{^} Shipments figures based on certification alone.

== See also ==
- Outline of the Beatles
- The Beatles timeline
