= Only a Northern Song =

- Cover of the Northern Songs sheet music (licensed to Sonora Musikförlag)

Song by the Beatles

from the album Yellow Submarine
- Released: 13 January 1969
- Recorded: 13–14 February and 20 April 1967
- Studio: EMI, London
- Genre: Psychedelia
- Length: 3:25
- Label: Apple
- Songwriter: George Harrison
- Producer: George Martin

"Only a Northern Song" is a song by the English rock band the Beatles from their 1969 soundtrack album Yellow Submarine. Written by George Harrison, it was the first of four songs the band provided for the 1968 animated film Yellow Submarine, to meet their contractual obligations to United Artists. The song was recorded mainly in February 1967, during the sessions for Sgt. Pepper's Lonely Hearts Club Band, but the Beatles chose not to include it on that album. The group completed the recording two months later, straight after finishing work on Sgt. Pepper.

Harrison wrote "Only a Northern Song" out of dissatisfaction with his status as a junior songwriter with the Beatles' publishing company, Northern Songs. The lyrics and music convey his disenchantment at how the company retained the copyright for the songs it published, and at how, following its public listing in 1965, the major shareholders profited more from his compositions than he did. The recording features a Hammond organ, played by Harrison, and an overdubbed montage of assorted sounds including trumpet blasts and spoken voices, anticipating John Lennon's 1968 sound collage "Revolution 9". Due to the difficulty in assembling the completed track from two tape sources, "Only a Northern Song" remained a rare song from the Beatles' post-1963 catalogue that was unavailable in true stereo until 1999. That year, it was remixed for inclusion on the album Yellow Submarine Songtrack.

The song has received a varied response from reviewers; while Ian MacDonald dismisses the track as a "self-indulgent dirge", the website Ultimate Classic Rock identifies it as one of the Beatles' best works in the psychedelic genre. A version of the song with a different vocal part, and omitting the sound collage overdubs, was issued on the Beatles' 1996 outtakes compilation Anthology 2. Gravenhurst and Yonder Mountain String Band are among the artists who have covered "Only a Northern Song".

== Background and inspiration ==
["Only a Northern Song"] was a joke relating to Liverpool, the Holy City in the North of England. In addition, the song was copyrighted Northern Songs Ltd., which I don't own, so:
It doesn't really matter what chords I play … as it's only a Northern Song.

— George Harrison, 1979

George Harrison said that the subject matter for "Only a Northern Song" related to both his city of birth, Liverpool, in Merseyside, and the fact that the copyright for the composition belonged to the Beatles' publishing company, Northern Songs. Author Brian Southall describes the song as Harrison's "personal denunciation of the Beatles' music publishing business", given his disadvantageous position with Northern Songs. The company was floated on the London Stock Exchange in February 1965, as a means of saving John Lennon and Paul McCartney, the Beatles' principal songwriters, the tax liability generated through the international success of their catalogue. Harrison had formed his own publishing company, Harrisongs, in late 1964; despite the financial advantages offered by his 80 per cent stake in that company, he agreed to remain with Northern Songs, to aid the flotation scheme. Among the four Beatles, Lennon and McCartney were major shareholders in Northern Songs, each owning 15 per cent of the public company's shares, and the pair earned considerable wealth over the first year of the flotation. Harrison and Ringo Starr, as contracted songwriters, owned 0.8 per cent each. This arrangement ensured that, in addition to the company retaining the copyright of all its published songs, Lennon and McCartney profited more from Harrison's compositions than he did.

When discussing the song in two late 1990s interviews with Billboard editor-in-chief Timothy White, Harrison commented that the main target of his complaints was Dick James, the managing director of Northern Songs. Having been signed by James in 1963, at the age of twenty, Harrison said that the publisher had failed to explain that by signing the contract, he was also signing away the ownership of his compositions. Harrison added that he only understood the consequences after the 1965 flotation, when the major shareholders were "making all this money out of this catalog". (Note: Harrison only began contributing regularly as a songwriter with the Beatles' 1965 albums Help! and Rubber Soul, for each of which he wrote two songs.) With reference to the Rutles' 1978 parody of the Beatles' history, All You Need Is Cash, he also told White: "I think [the message behind 'Only a Northern Song'] was put better in the make-believe TV documentary … where it said, 'Dick Jaws, an out-of-work music publisher of no fixed ability' signed them up for the rest of their lives."

In author Ian MacDonald's estimation, "Only a Northern Song" suggests that Harrison "had yet to recover his enthusiasm for being a Beatle" after he had threatened to leave the group following their final concert tour, in August 1966. Before the band regrouped in November that year to begin recording their album Sgt. Pepper's Lonely Hearts Club Band, Harrison spent six weeks in India with his sitar teacher, Ravi Shankar, a visit that heightened his lack of interest in the Beatles' project. MacDonald considers that Harrison's link with northern England in "Only a Northern Song" was influenced by the Beatles working on songs about growing up in Liverpool, which was the concept under consideration at the start of the Sgt. Pepper sessions.

== Composition and musical structure ==
Harrison wrote "Only a Northern Song" on a Hammond organ, which became his preferred instrument for songwriting during 1967, replacing the guitar. The song is in the key of A major, although MacDonald gives B minor as a secondary key. The opening organ part ends with a preview of the melody over which the song title appears in the song proper. After this short introduction, the composition is structured into two portions, each consisting of two verses and a chorus, which are followed by a single verse, a final chorus and an outro, with some of these sections rendered as instrumental passages.

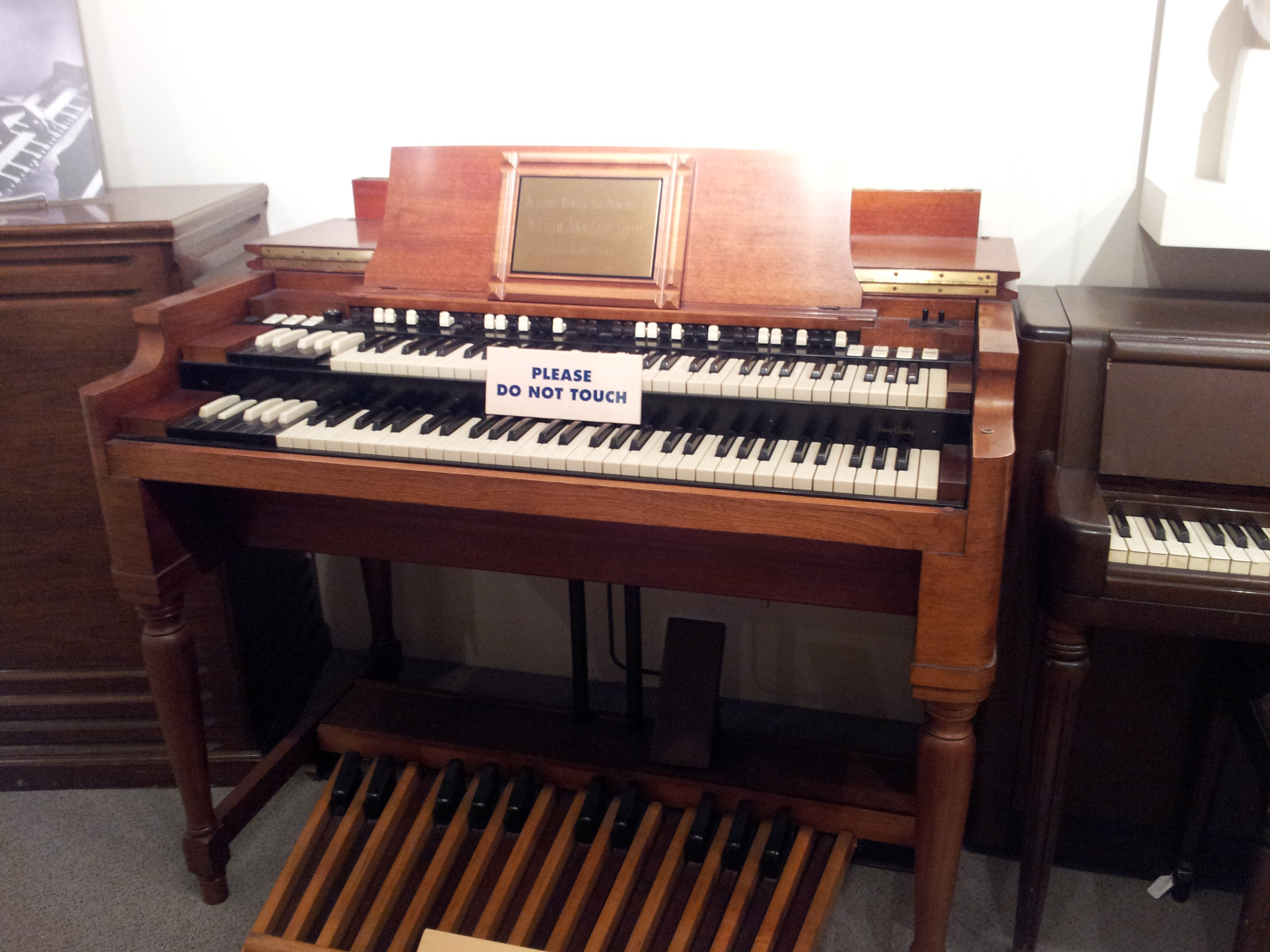
A Hammond B3 organ. Along with "Within You Without You", "It's All Too Much" and "Blue Jay Way", "Only a Northern Song" was one of several compositions that Harrison wrote on a keyboard instrument during a period when he was otherwise immersed in studying the Indian sitar.

The composition is a meta-song, in that its subject is the work itself. While commenting on the pointlessness of writing for Northern Songs, Harrison employs sarcasm and musical dissonance to express his dissatisfaction with the company. In musicologist Walter Everett's description, this is achieved musically through the use of "ill-behaved tones" and "wrong-mode" chords. (Note: The latter device is employed in several Beatles compositions from the 1965–67 period, including Harrison's "Think for Yourself", and serves to add harmonic expression to the song's melody.)

From the verse's opening A major chord, the melody moves to a ii minor voicing, rendered as Bm^{7/11} through the inclusion of a low-register E note. In his lyrics, Harrison acknowledges the apparent awkwardness of such a change, singing "You may think the chords are going wrong" and, in the final verse, that the harmony "might be a little dark and out of key". Musicologist Alan Pollack considers the song's music and lyrical message to be "uncannily in tune" with one another, and that this effect is accentuated by surprising and irregular phrase-lengths in the verses.

In contrast to the minimal chord changes over the verses, the choruses present a fast progression of chords – specifically, E, Bm^{7}, G, C♯^{7} and F♯^{7}. In the first chorus, Harrison comments that, given the inadequacy of his publishing arrangement, "It doesn't really matter what chords I play". Author Ian Inglis interprets this line as mirroring the singer's complaint to Beatles biographer Hunter Davies in the late 1960s, regarding the futility of the band's live performances when their screaming fans never listened to the music the Beatles were playing. Harrison biographer Simon Leng describes "Only a Northern Song" as the first example of its composer "pushing back at the Beatles as an organization he found wanting", a theme Harrison returned to in 1968 with "Not Guilty", with his comments on the group's internal discord. (Note: Everett and music journalist Robert Fontenot both liken "Only a Northern Song" to "Taxman", a 1966 Harrison composition in which he protests at the British Treasury's excessive taxation of the Beatles' earnings. That same year, Harrison began writing "Art of Dying", the original lyrics of which named Brian Epstein, the band's manager, and commented on the superficiality of the Beatles' career.)

== Production ==
=== Recording ===
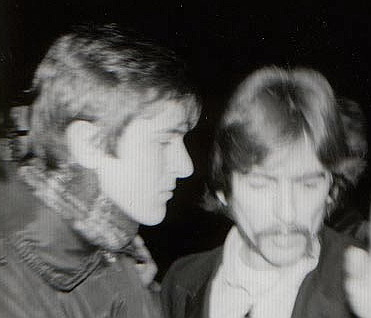
Harrison (right), with music journalist Veljko Despot, outside EMI Studios in February 1967

The Beatles taped the basic track for "Only a Northern Song" at EMI Studios (now Abbey Road Studios) on 13 February 1967, during the sessions for Sgt. Pepper's Lonely Hearts Club Band. As was typical with his new compositions, Harrison had yet to give the song a title, so it was referred to as "Not Known". The line-up on the track was Harrison on organ, Lennon on tambourine, McCartney on bass and Starr on drums. The band recorded nine takes of the song before selecting take 3 for further work. The following day, the studio engineers carried out three reduction mixes of this performance onto fresh 4-track tapes. On what was now called take 12 (the third of the reduction mixes), Harrison filled the two available tracks with his lead vocals.

The song was disliked by the Beatles' producer, George Martin, who later said it was his least favourite song of Harrison's. The band were similarly unenthusiastic and it was decided to omit the song from the album. As his sole writing contribution to Sgt. Pepper, Harrison instead offered the Indian-styled "Within You Without You", which, in Martin's recollection, was welcomed with "a bit of a relief all round". "Only a Northern Song" then became the first track the group supplied for the soundtrack to the Yellow Submarine animated film, in line with their contractual obligation to United Artists to provide four new songs. Described by Beatles historian Mark Lewisohn as a "myth", a story later circulated that Harrison had rush-written the composition for United Artists in early 1968, after Al Brodax, the film's producer, approached the band for a final song. (Note: In this alternative account, the Beatles were said to be working in the studio at 2 am, and Harrison assured Brodax he would write a new song within the hour. Harrison then allegedly presented the finished composition with the words: "Here Al – it's only a Northern song.")

=== Overdubbing ===
I remember playing a silly trumpet [on "Only a Northern Song"]. My dad used to play. I can't, but I can mess around a lot – and that song gave me the perfect framework. It was very tongue in cheek.

— Paul McCartney, 2000

The group returned to take 3 of "Only a Northern Song" on 20 April, a day when members of the Yellow Submarine production team visited them in the studio. The band started working on the song less than 45 minutes after completing the final mixing on Sgt. Pepper, demonstrating what Lewisohn terms a "tremendous appetite" to continue recording.

Retaining the organ and drum tracks, they overdubbed a new bass guitar part and, on a separate track, trumpet, glockenspiel and vocalised sounds. A second 4-track tape recorder was used, so allowing the various instrumental parts and studio effects to be spread across eight available channels. On this machine, the band worked on the second reduction-mix tape from 14 February, known as take 11, from which they wiped all the previously recorded tracks except the Hammond organ part. Harrison then recorded two tracks of vocal, one of which included more trumpet from McCartney and further vocalised sounds, while the final track was filled with timpani, Mellotron, piano and more organ. The presence of Harrison's original Hammond part on both of the tapes ensured that the instrument had a more substantial sound in the mix.

The Beatles performed many of the overdubs in a haphazard manner. Tom Maginnis of AllMusic describes the completed track as "heavily steeped in the psychedelic sounds of the period, using liberal amounts of loose instrumentation", particularly "chaotic bursts of trumpet". (Note: Acknowledging his lack of ability on the instrument, McCartney recalled: "The film producers were wandering around the studio and they had to sort of go along with this – I saw some very sad faces while I'm playing the trumpet." MacDonald describes the recording as "a consciously slovenly piece of work".) According to Pollack, these additions constitute a "noise track", which further heightens the theme of discordance, and is used to fill the song's instrumental sections, becoming especially prominent during the outro. With its inclusion of random sounds and spoken voices, Inglis cites the sound collage effect as a precedent for Lennon's 1968 avant-garde track "Revolution 9" and an early example of electronic music.

=== Mixing ===
On 21 April, the Beatles completed a mono mix of the song for its inclusion in Yellow Submarine. Due to the difficulty in getting the two 4-track machines to play at exactly the same time, attempts at creating a stereo equivalent were abandoned.

In October 1968, while preparing the Yellow Submarine soundtrack album for release, EMI's engineers created a duophonic (or mock-stereo) mix of "Only a Northern Song" from the mono mix. The monaural version of the album, which was originally available only in the UK, similarly used a suboptimal version of the recording. In this case, as with the three other new songs presented to United Artists, the engineers combined the two channels from the duophonic mix, rather than use the true mono mix from April 1967. (Note: The song's original mix was unavailable until the 2009 remastering of the Beatles' catalogue, when it appeared on the Yellow Submarine CD and as part of the Beatles in Mono box set.)

== Appearance in Yellow Submarine film ==
A still from the sequence for "Only a Northern Song"

The Beatles had minimal involvement in the making of Yellow Submarine, leaving the production to Brodax's company King Features Syndicate. The film-makers drew heavily on the Sgt. Pepper concept, the Beatles' association with Liverpool, and other aspects of their public image. While the project's art design was carried out by a team led by Heinz Edelmann, sequences such as "Eleanor Rigby" and "Only a Northern Song" were created by outside animators, ensuring stylistic variation across the film.

"Only a Northern Song" plays over a scene when the yellow submarine travels through the Sea of Science, during the Beatles' quest to free Pepperland and the imprisoned Sgt. Pepper's Lonely Hearts Club Band from the music-hating Blue Meanies. The recording was slowed down by a semitone for inclusion in the film. Referring to the psychedelic imagery in the animation, author Stephen Glynn says that this segment "only 'makes sense' when read as attempting an audio-visual recreation of the hallucinogenic state". Jeremiah Massengale, an academic in the field of visual communication, highlights the sequence as one of many technical innovations introduced by the 1968 film, saying: "accompanying multi-colored, square portrait paintings of the Beatles during 'Only a Northern Song', there's a creative use of an oscillator picking out the sound waves of the track." (Note: According to author Michael Frontani, many sources recognise Yellow Submarine as having been the saviour of animated feature films, "or at least [with] creating an alternative to the Disney approach".)

In his book The Beatles Movies, Bob Neaverson says that the segment arguably represents the best example of the film's adoption of the psychedelic iconography typical of 1960s underground poster art. He describes it as a "simulated 'trip' sequence" and adds, "Here, bright strobes of alternating primary colour and close-ups of the Beatles' ears attached to frequency monitors emphasize a higher reality than that of the objective world and, in the employment of irrational imagery and a visceral onslaught of 'mind-blowing' colour, attempt to simulate a hypnotic 'psych-out' of epic proportions." Glynn cites the drug-inspired imagery of "Only a Northern Song" and two other song sequences as the true reason that Rank pulled Yellow Submarine from its UK cinema run, rather than the company's official reasoning that the film had performed poorly at the box office.

The segment was among the clips shown in a feature about Yellow Submarine on the television show How It Is. Produced by Tony Palmer and including portions of the stage play based on Lennon's book In His Own Write, the show was broadcast on BBC1 two days after the film's world premiere in London, on 19 July 1968. By the early 21st century, "Only a Northern Song" was the only music clip from the How It Is broadcast circulating among collectors.

== Release and reception ==
The film soundtrack was viewed as a secondary work by the Beatles, who delayed its release to allow for their 1968 eponymous double album (also known as the "White Album"). On 13 January 1969, "Only a Northern Song" was issued as the second track on side one of the Yellow Submarine LP, with George Martin's orchestral score for the film occupying the whole of side two. Although Harrison's contract with James had expired in March 1968, the copyright for "Only a Northern Song" and his second contribution to the film, "It's All Too Much", remained with Northern Songs rather than being assigned to Harrisongs as his four White Album compositions had been. The song's release coincided with a period of acrimony between Dick James and the Beatles, particularly Lennon and McCartney, about whom Lewisohn writes: "If John and Paul still thought they owned their songs [following the flotation of Northern Songs] they were deluding themselves." In March 1969, having become wary of the disharmony within the band and the problems affecting their Apple Corps business empire, James sold his majority shareholding in Northern Songs to Lew Grade's ATV Music, thereby selling on the ownership of the Beatles catalogue. (Note: With the ATV buyout, Lennon and McCartney also forfeited all publishing royalties from their first 56 registered compositions and were stuck with what McCartney termed "the 1963 rate" for the publishing royalties from their later songs. By comparison, Harrison's 80 per cent stake in Harrisongs (which increased to 100 per cent in 1970) ensured that he alone profited from his late-period Beatles compositions such as "Something" and "Here Comes the Sun".)

In a contemporary review of Yellow Submarine, Beat Instrumental lamented that it offered little new material by the band, but described "Only a Northern Song" and "It's All Too Much" as "superb pieces" that "redeem" side one. Record Mirror's reviewer said that whereas most of the songs were "simple Beatles stuff", "Only a Northern Song" appeared to be a "technical experiment in how many off-key variations on a solid background tune one can get in, [while] still maintaining a reasonable amount of finesse – and it comes off very well". Recalling the release in his 1977 book The Beatles Forever, however, Nicholas Schaffner dismissed the track as one of the "trifling baubles" the Beatles provided for the film. While adhering to Brodax's account of the song's creation, NME critic Bob Woffinden found "considerable merit" in "Only a Northern Song", and said that Harrison's divergence from his usual, methodical approach to songwriting was one he should pursue more often.

In January 1996, the song was issued as the B-side to "It's All Too Much" on a blue-vinyl jukebox single, as part of a series of Beatles releases by Capitol Records' CEMA Special Markets division. By 1999, "Only a Northern Song" remained one of only two post-1963 Beatles songs not to have been made available in true stereo (the other being "You Know My Name (Look Up the Number)"). That year, a stereo version became available when the track was remixed for inclusion on the album Yellow Submarine Songtrack, which accompanied the DVD re-release of the animated film. (Note: According to author John Winn, in this way, "Time has been kinder to George's song", since the long-overdue stereo mix introduced clarity where the duophonic treatment had rendered the sounds as "one unlistenable lump".) Harrison was the most active of the former Beatles in promoting the 1999 reissue, which he said was timely, given that the Blue Meanies "have got a bigger stranglehold on the planet right now than they ever had back in 1967!" He added that "even the music industry has turned grey and is dominated by Blue Meanies."

== Retrospective assessment and legacy ==
"Only a Northern Song" was George Harrison realising that the music business is not a lot of fun. That's probably why we got on so well!

— Neil Innes of the Rutles, 2003

Writing for Billboard in 2001, Bill Holland grouped "Only a Northern Song" with the Byrds' "So You Want to Be a Rock 'n' Roll Star" and early-1970s releases by the Kinks and Joni Mitchell, as songs that constitute the first wave of musical statements in which artists "accuse or indict their industry's business policies". Ian Inglis views "Only a Northern Song" as the Beatles' "first 'postmodern' song", due to the "deliberate ironic intent" evident in the subject matter and in the use of tape effects and scattered conversation.

As with most of the Beatles' post-Sgt. Pepper 1967 recordings, their contributions to Yellow Submarine have traditionally been held in low regard by the band's biographers. Mark Lewisohn describes the group's 20 April overdubs on "Only a Northern Song" as "a curious session" and writes that their work over this period "display[s] a startling lack of cohesion and enthusiasm". Mark Hertsgaard considers that "Only a Northern Song" was "understandably … rejected as not good enough for Sgt. Pepper". Ian MacDonald views it as "dismal", a "self-indulgent dirge", and the Beatles' first "consciously slovenly" recording.

In his book Psychedelia and Other Colours, Rob Chapman says that "Only a Northern Song" is one of the "most misunderstood and maligned" Beatles tracks, and that analyses such as MacDonald's miss "vital nuances", including a transcendent quality beyond Harrison's sarcasm over his publishing concerns, such that the lyrics reveal as much about the "illusory nature of existence" as Lennon's "Tomorrow Never Knows". Chapman says it would have been a welcome companion to "Within You Without You" on Sgt. Pepper and a counterbalance to the "forced jauntiness" elsewhere on that album. He also recognises the song as the only psychedelic track by the Beatles to fully address "the effect of listening to music on drugs".

Among more recent reviews of Yellow Submarine, Peter Doggett, writing for Mojo, credits Harrison's two compositions with "[doing] much to rescue the album from oblivion", and he describes "Only a Northern Song" as "gloriously ironic". (Note: Doggett also deems it "the most eloquent commentary on the Northern Songs saga", in contrast to Lennon calling James a "pig" and a "fascist bum" when, late in the band's career, the publisher used to visit the Beatles in the recording studio.) Alex Young of Consequence of Sound views it as "lyrically the quintessential track", since "it perfectly defines Yellow Submarine in two verses alone, while coming out sonically like a Pink Floyd b-side from the Obscured by Clouds sessions ..." By contrast, Mark Kemp of Paste dismisses the song as a "meandering bore". Pitchfork's Mark Richardson says that, like "It's All Too Much", it offers little of interest aside from the "swirling" psychedelic effects, although the song "at least has a good joke going for it".

Writing for Ultimate Classic Rock in 2013, Dave Swanson ranked the track third on his list of the "Top 10 Beatles Psychedelic Songs" (following "Tomorrow Never Knows" and "I Am the Walrus"). He deemed it a "mind-melter" that would have made Sgt. Pepper "even greater" had it been included instead of a song such as "When I'm Sixty Four". In 2006, "Only a Northern Song" was ranked 75th in Mojo's list "The 101 Greatest Beatles Songs", where songwriter Glenn Tilbrook described it as "a wonderfully unexpected tune" with a "lovely ... sardonic lyric" that "could be the inspiration for a thousand Rutles songs". He added: "musically, it's a very literate song. And up against Lennon and McCartney it takes quite a lot of balls to do that."

== Other versions ==
An alternative edit of the song was included on the Beatles' Anthology 2 out-takes compilation in 1996. Slightly sped up, and mixed in stereo, this version comprises the basic track without most of the April 1967 overdubs, and with an alternate vocal take that contains some changes to the lyrics. According to music historian Richie Unterberger, aside from the lyrics, the Anthology 2 version demonstrates that "Only a Northern Song" was "much more like a standard rock song" before "the fanciful overdubs of trumpet and other strained far-outisms". (Note: The new track was created by combining take 3 with Harrison's vocals from take 12.)

Coinciding with the popularity of "It's All Too Much" among acid-rock bands of the early 1990s, Sun Dial released a cover of "Only a Northern Song" as the B-side of their 1991 single "Fireball". In 2009, Greg Davis and jazz singer-songwriter Chris Weisman named their psychedelic folk partnership, Northern Songs, after the Beatles track. The pair's 2010 album Northern Songs similarly honoured the song and included a cover version of "It's All Too Much".

When Mojo released the CD Yellow Submarine Resurfaces in July 2012, "Only a Northern Song" was covered by Gravenhurst. Yonder Mountain String Band included the song in their live performances during 2013 and 2015.

== Personnel ==
According to Ian MacDonald:

- George Harrison – vocals, Hammond organ, additional organ, dialogue, noises
- John Lennon – glockenspiel, piano, dialogue, noises
- Paul McCartney – bass guitar, trumpet, noises
- Ringo Starr – drums, noises
- uncredited (played by the Beatles) – timpani, Mellotron, additional percussion

== Sources ==
- Badman, Keith (2001). The Beatles Diary Volume 2: After the Break-Up 1970–2001. London: Omnibus Press. ISBN 978-0-7119-8307-6.
- The Beatles (2000). The Beatles Anthology. San Francisco, CA: Chronicle Books. ISBN 0-8118-2684-8.
- Chapman, Rob (2015). Psychedelia and Other Colours. London: Faber & Faber. ISBN 978-0-571-28200-5.
- Clayson, Alan (2003). George Harrison. London: Sanctuary. ISBN 1-86074-489-3.
- Doggett, Peter (2003). "Yellow Submarine: Underwater Treasure". Mojo Special Limited Edition: 1000 Days of Revolution (The Beatles' Final Years – Jan 1, 1968 to Sept 27, 1970). London: Emap. pp. 76–79.
- Doggett, Peter (2011). You Never Give Me Your Money: The Beatles After the Breakup. New York, NY: It Books. ISBN 978-0-06-177418-8.
- Everett, Walter (1999). The Beatles as Musicians: Revolver Through the Anthology. New York, NY: Oxford University Press. ISBN 0-19-512941-5.
- Frontani, Michael R. (2007). The Beatles: Image and the Media. Jackson, MS: University Press of Mississippi. ISBN 978-1-57806-966-8.
- Glynn, Stephen (2013). The British Pop Music Film: The Beatles and Beyond. Basingstoke, UK: Palgrave Macmillan. ISBN 978-0-230-39222-9.
- Gould, Jonathan (2007). Can't Buy Me Love: The Beatles, Britain and America. London: Piatkus. ISBN 978-0-7499-2988-6.
- Greene, Joshua M. (2006). Here Comes the Sun: The Spiritual and Musical Journey of George Harrison. Hoboken, NJ: John Wiley & Sons. ISBN 978-0-470-12780-3.
- Harrison, George (2002) [1980]. I, Me, Mine. San Francisco, CA: Chronicle Books. ISBN 978-0-8118-5900-4.
- Harry, Bill (2003). The George Harrison Encyclopedia. London: Virgin Books. ISBN 978-0-7535-0822-0.
- Hertsgaard, Mark (1996). A Day in the Life: The Music and Artistry of the Beatles. London: Pan Books. ISBN 0-330-33891-9.
- Huntley, Elliot J. (2006). Mystical One: George Harrison – After the Break-up of the Beatles. Toronto, ON: Guernica Editions. ISBN 1-55071-197-0.
- Ingham, Chris (2006). The Rough Guide to the Beatles (2nd edn). London: Rough Guides/Penguin. ISBN 978-1-84836-525-4.
- Inglis, Ian (2009). "Revolution". In Womack, Kenneth (ed.). The Cambridge Companion to the Beatles. Cambridge, UK: Cambridge University Press. ISBN 978-0-521-68976-2.
- Inglis, Ian (2010). The Words and Music of George Harrison. Santa Barbara, CA: Praeger. ISBN 978-0-313-37532-3.
- Leng, Simon (2006). While My Guitar Gently Weeps: The Music of George Harrison. Milwaukee, WI: Hal Leonard. ISBN 978-1-4234-0609-9.
- Lewisohn, Mark (2003). "Going for a Song". Mojo Special Limited Edition: 1000 Days of Revolution (The Beatles' Final Years – Jan 1, 1968 to Sept 27, 1970). London: Emap. pp. 98–103.
- Lewisohn, Mark (2005) [1988]. The Complete Beatles Recording Sessions: The Official Story of the Abbey Road Years 1962–1970. London: Bounty Books. ISBN 978-0-7537-2545-0.
- MacDonald, Ian (2005). Revolution in the Head: The Beatles' Records and the Sixties (2nd rev. edn). Chicago, IL: Chicago Review Press. ISBN 978-1-55652-733-3.
- Miles, Barry (2001). The Beatles Diary Volume 1: The Beatles Years. London: Omnibus Press. ISBN 0-7119-8308-9.
- Pedler, Dominic (2003). The Songwriting Secrets of the Beatles. London: Omnibus Press. ISBN 978-0-7119-8167-6.
- Rodriguez, Robert (2012). Revolver: How the Beatles Reimagined Rock 'n' Roll. Milwaukee, WI: Backbeat Books. ISBN 978-1-61713-009-0.
- Schaffner, Nicholas (1978). The Beatles Forever. New York, NY: McGraw-Hill. ISBN 0-07-055087-5.
- Sounes, Howard (2010). Fab: An Intimate Life of Paul McCartney. London: HarperCollins. ISBN 978-0-00-723705-0.
- Southall, Brian; with Perry, Rupert (2007). Northern Songs: The True Story of the Beatles Song Publishing Empire. London: Omnibus Press. ISBN 978-1-84609-996-0.
- Spizer, Bruce (2005). The Beatles Solo on Apple Records. Orleans, LA: 498 Productions. ISBN 0-9662649-5-9.
- Turner, Steve (1999). A Hard Day's Write: The Stories Behind Every Beatles Song (2nd edn). New York, NY: Carlton/HarperCollins. ISBN 0-06-273698-1.
- Unterberger, Richie (2006). The Unreleased Beatles: Music & Film. San Francisco, CA: Backbeat Books. ISBN 978-0-87930-892-6.
- Winn, John C. (2009). That Magic Feeling: The Beatles' Recorded Legacy, Volume Two, 1966–1970. New York, NY: Three Rivers Press. ISBN 978-0-3074-5239-9.
- Woffinden, Bob (1981). The Beatles Apart. London: Proteus. ISBN 0-906071-89-5.
- Womack, Kenneth (2014). The Beatles Encyclopedia: Everything Fab Four. Santa Barbara, CA: ABC-CLIO. ISBN 978-0-3133-9171-2.
