= Yellow Submarine (film) =

1968 film by George Dunning

- British theatrical release poster
- Directed by: George Dunning
- Screenplay by: Lee Minoff; Al Brodax; Jack Mendelsohn; Erich Segal
- Story by: Lee Minoff
- Based on: "Yellow Submarine" by Lennon–McCartney
- Produced by: Al Brodax
- Starring: Paul Angelis; John Clive; Dick Emery; Geoffrey Hughes; Lance Percival
- Narrated by: Paul Angelis
- Edited by: Brian J. Bishop
- Music by: Lennon–McCartney; George Harrison; George Martin
- Production companies: Apple Films; King Features Syndicate; TVC London
- Distributed by: United Artists
- Release dates: 17 July 1968 (UK); 12 November 1968 (U.S.)
- Running time: 87 minutes (UK version); 85 minutes (international version); 89 minutes (restored version)
- Countries: United Kingdom; United States
- Language: English
- Budget: $1–1.7 million
- Box office: $9 million+

Yellow Submarine is a 1968 animated musical film inspired by the music of the Beatles, directed by George Dunning with art direction by Heinz Edelmann. Initial press reports stated that the Beatles themselves would provide their own character voices. However, apart from composing and performing the songs, the real Beatles' only participation was in the closing scene of the film; the voices of their animated counterparts were provided by voice actors.

The film received widespread acclaim from critics and audiences alike. Filmmaker and former Pixar and Disney chief creative officer John Lasseter has credited the film with generating wider interest in animation as a serious art form, as in the West it had been generally considered a children's medium at the time. Time commented that it delighted "adolescents and aesthetes alike". Half a century after its release, it is still regarded as a landmark of animation and among the greatest animated films of all time.

== Plot ==
Pepperland is a music-loving paradise under the sea, home to Sgt. Pepper's Lonely Hearts Club Band. The titular Yellow Submarine rests on an Aztec-like pyramid on a hill. At the edge of the land is a range of high blue mountains.

The land falls under a surprise attack from the music-hating Blue Meanies, who live beyond the mountains. The attack starts with a music-proof glass globe that imprisons the band. The Blue Meanies fire projectiles and drop apples (a reference to the Beatles' then-new company Apple Corps) that render Pepperland's residents immobile as statues, and drain the entire countryside of colour.

In the last minutes before his capture, Pepperland's elderly Lord High Mayor sends Young (Old) Fred to get help. The Apple Bonkers "bonk" the Mayor with several large apples as Fred takes off in the Yellow Submarine ("Yellow Submarine"). He travels to Liverpool ("Eleanor Rigby") where he follows a depressed Ringo to "The Pier", a building on the top of a hill, and persuades him to return to Pepperland with him. Ringo collects his mates John, George, and Paul. The four decide to help Fred, and journey with him back to Pepperland in the Yellow Submarine ("All Together Now"). They pass the Sea of Time ("When I'm Sixty-Four"), the Sea of Science ("Only A Northern Song"), and the Sea of Monsters, where Ringo presses the forbidden panic button, and gets swept out of the submarine. John, Paul and George manage to save Ringo with a rescue button, bringing him back before a vacuum cleaner monster swallows the entire Sea of Monsters and then swallows itself. After the submarine's motor breaks down, they meet Jeremy Hillary Boob Ph.D., a short and studious creature ("Nowhere Man"), busily working at his typewriter. The Boob easily repairs the submarine's motor, and Ringo invites him to join them. After arriving at the Foothills of the Headlands ("Lucy In The Sky With Diamonds"), they are accidentally separated from the submarine and Fred. They then find themselves in the Sea of Holes, where Jeremy is abducted by a Blue Meanie. Ringo picks up the hole that Jeremy was previously stuck in and puts it in his pocket. When he steps on a green hole, it turns into the Sea of Green, after which the group arrives in Pepperland.

Reunited with Fred and reviving the apple-bonked Lord Mayor, they look upon Pepperland's desolate, grey landscape. After spending the night in the Grand Bandstand, The Beatles dress up as Sgt. Pepper's Lonely Hearts Club Band, steal some instruments, and rally the land to rebellion ("Sgt. Pepper's Lonely Hearts Club Band" and "With A Little Help From My Friends"). The Chief Blue Meanie retaliates by sending out the Dreadful Flying Glove, which John defeats ("All You Need Is Love"). Pepperland is restored to colour as its residents revive and flowers re-bloom. Ringo uses the hole in his pocket to release the Lonely Hearts Club Band, and they join the Beatles in combating the Meanies' multi-headed dog ("Hey Bulldog"). Ringo then rescues Jeremy, who performs some "transformation magic" on the Chief Blue Meanie, causing the Meanie to bloom roses and sadly concede defeat. John extends an offer of friendship, and the Chief Blue Meanie has a change of heart, sheds a tear and accepts, confessing that he is related to the Bluebird of Happiness. The Beatles, the Blue Meanies and the Pepperlandians then celebrate their new peace and love ("It's All Too Much").

The film ends with a segment featuring the real Beatles, who playfully show their souvenirs from their journey: George has the submarine's motor, Paul has "a little 'love'," and Ringo has "half a hole" in his pocket (having apparently given the other half to Jeremy, though Paul recommends to "fix it to keep his mind from wandering"). John, looking through a telescope, tells the group, and the audience, that "newer and bluer Meanies have been sighted within the vicinity of this theatre" and that everyone will need to sing to ensure the audience escapes. The Beatles then lead the audience in a sing along to "All Together Now", which ends with translations of the song's title in various languages appearing in sequence on the screen.

== Cast ==
=== Voice cast ===
- The Beatles as the Beatles' singing voices (as Sgt. Pepper's Lonely Hearts Club Band)
- Paul Angelis as Opening Narrator / The Chief Blue Meanie / Ringo Starr / George Harrison (additional dialogue)
- John Clive as John Lennon
- Dick Emery as Max / Lord Mayor / Jeremy Hillary Boob Ph.D.
- Geoffrey Hughes as Paul McCartney (as Geoff Hughes)
- Lance Percival as "Young / Old" Fred
- Peter Batten as George Harrison (uncredited)

==== Voice cast notes ====
- According to the special features section of the Yellow Submarine home media release, Peter Batten provided the voice of George for about the first half of the film. Before he finished recording for the film, he was discovered to be a deserter from the British Army of the Rhine in West Germany, and was arrested. His part was completed by Angelis, who was also the voice of Ringo and the Chief Blue Meanie.
- Percival also provided the voices of Paul and Ringo for the United States ABC TV cartoon series The Beatles.
- As in their previous films, the animated Beatles are fictionalised versions of themselves. They live alone together in a large house in Liverpool, despite their real-life counterparts by then being married, having children, or living on their own. They are referred to only by their first names, although the group's name is mentioned in passing when George calls the anti-music bubble "Beatle-proof" and John replies, "Nothing is Beatle-proof!", and when Paul shouts "Beatles to Battle!"

=== Live-action ===
- George Harrison as himself (uncredited)
- John Lennon as himself (uncredited)
- Paul McCartney as himself (uncredited)
- Ringo Starr as himself (uncredited)

== Production ==
=== Development ===
The idea for the film came from Al Brodax, who had previously produced the animated series The Beatles. Animation was commissioned from the London-based studio TVC by the film division of the American publisher King Features Syndicate, which had previously collaborated with Brodax on the series. The film was also financed and distributed by the American major studio United Artists, which had distributed the Beatles' two previous films, A Hard Day's Night (1964) and Help! (1965), both directed by Richard Lester. Brodax envisioned the film as a straightforward children's movie, similar to the earlier animated series, but director George Dunning and his team wanted to create a more artistically ambitious film that would also appeal to an adult audience.

The Beatles were not enthusiastic about participating in a new motion picture, having been dissatisfied with their second feature film, Help!, and the animated series, and were wary of having the film made by the same team. However, they saw an animated film as a favourable way to complete their commitment to United Artists for a third film. Many fans have assumed that the cartoon did not meet the contract's requirements, since a later live action movie was produced, but the documentary film Let It Be (1970) was not connected to the original three-picture deal.

George Martin recalled, “The Beatles were against the idea from the beginning. The Beatles clearly thought it was going to be yet another rip-off and wanted nothing to do with it. They loathed the idea of the cartoon characters because they had visions of Popeye or this kind of quite crude animation.” George Harrison said, “The thing I like the most about the movie was that we didn’t really have anything to do with it.” John Lennon reportedly remarked, “Nothing’s too good for the film. So that’s what we’ll give them—nothing!” He also insisted that any song considered substandard would be given to the film. Nevertheless, the Beatles made occasional visits during production, particularly Paul McCartney, who was especially interested in animation.

Asked about the film's creative team, John Lennon called the artists “gross animals”, except for Heinz Edelmann, whom he praised as “the guy who drew the painting”. He also accused them of using the Beatles' ideas without credit, including the Blue Meanies, which he claimed as his own creation, as well as the machine that sucks people up and the Flying Glove. Lennon was further irritated by the artists attending rehearsals at Abbey Road Studios to observe the Beatles.

The Beatles make a live-action cameo appearance in the final scene, which was filmed on 25 January 1968, shortly before the band's trip to India. This was done primarily to fulfil their contractual obligation to United Artists to actually appear in the film. The cameo was originally intended to feature a post-production psychedelic background and effects, but because of time and budget constraints, a blank, black background remained in the final film. While Ringo Starr and Paul McCartney still looked the same as their animated counterparts, John Lennon's and George Harrison's physical appearances had changed by the time the cameo was shot. Both were clean-shaven, and Lennon had begun to grow his hair longer with accompanying mutton-chop sideburns.

The original story was written by Lee Minoff, based on the song by Lennon and McCartney, and the screenplay was penned by four collaborators including Erich Segal. Harrison's character's recurring line "It's all in the mind" is taken from The Goon Show and was also said by John in The Beatles animated series in the episode "Strawberry Fields".

As with many motion-picture musicals, the music takes precedence over the actual plot, and most of the story is a series of set pieces designed to present Beatles music set to various images, in a form reminiscent of Walt Disney's Fantasia. Nonetheless, the film still presents a modern-day fairy tale representing the values of its intended hippie audience.

The dialogue is littered with puns, double entendres and Beatles in-jokes. In the DVD commentary track, production supervisor John Coates states that many of these lines were written by Liverpudlian poet Roger McGough (who, coincidentally at that time, was married to Thelma Pickles, a former girlfriend of both Lennon and McCartney), though he received no credit in the film.

In the DVD commentary track, Coates states that the Meanies were always intended to be coloured blue. However, background supervisor Millicent McMillan recalls that the Blue Meanies were originally supposed to be red, or even purple, but when Heinz Edelmann's assistant accidentally changed the colours, the film's characters took on a different meaning. Coates acknowledges in the commentary that the "Are you Bluish? You don't look Bluish" joke in the film is a pun on the then-contemporary expression "You don't look Jewish", but that it was not intended to be derogatory. It was a reference to how most villains in movies were played by Jewish actors.

=== Animation ===
The animation design of Yellow Submarine has sometimes been incorrectly attributed to famous psychedelic pop art artist of the era Peter Max, as his art style greatly resembles the style used in the film, but the film's art director was in fact Heinz Edelmann, who along with such contemporaries as Milton Glaser and Seymour Chwast pioneered the psychedelic style for which Max later became famous.

Animators Robert Balser and Jack Stokes were hired as the film's animation directors.

Charlie Jenkins, one of the film's key creative directors, was responsible for the entire "Eleanor Rigby" sequence, as well as the submarine journey from Liverpool, through London, to splashdown. Jenkins also was responsible for "Only a Northern Song" in the Sea of Science, plus much of the multi-image sequences.

A large crew of skilled animators, including (in alphabetical order) Alan Ball, Ron Campbell, John Challis, Hester Coblentz, Geoff Collins, Rich Cox, Duane Crowther, Tony Cuthbert, Malcolm Draper, Paul Driessen, Cam Ford, Norm Drew, Tom Halley, Dick Horne, Arthur Humberstone, Dennis Hunt, Greg Irons, Dianne Jackson, Anne Jolliffe, Dave Livesey, Reg Lodge, Geoff Loynes, Lawrence Moorcroft, Ted Percival, Mike Pocock, Gerald Potterton, and Peter Tupy, were responsible for bringing the animated Beatles to life. But in order to complete the 11 month deadline, dozens of art students from local London art colleges were brought in for night shifts to hand-ink the required over 132,000 frames. Due to decentralized production and time constraints, different animators interpreted Edelmann's model sheets differently with varying degrees of accuracy, so many official animation cells are unintentionally and frequently drawn 'off-model' and feature inconsistent proportions and improvised designs. The main cast’s facial features, proportions, line thickness, or details change subtly from scene to scene and shifting in several colouring and drawing continuity errors. Instead of ruining the film, these imperfections blended perfectly into the fluid, psychedelic art style making the accidental distortion of reality look entirely intentional.

The background work was executed by artists under the direction of Alison de Vere and Millicent McMillan, who were both background supervisors. Ted Lewis and Chris Miles were responsible for animation cleanup.

George Dunning, who also worked on The Beatles cartoon series, was the overall director for the film, supervising over 200 artists for 11 months, with an estimated budget of $1–1.7 million. "Lucy in the Sky with Diamonds" was Dunning's idea, which he turned over to Bill Sewell, who delivered more than thirty minutes of rotoscoped images. By that time Dunning was unavailable, and Bob Balser, with the help of Arne Gustafson, edited the material to its sequence length in the film.

Edelmann's surreal visual style contrasts greatly with the efforts of Walt Disney Animation Studios and other animated Hollywood films that had been previously released at the time (a fact noted by Pauline Kael in her positive review of the film). The film uses a style of limited animation. It also paved the way for Terry Gilliam's animations for Do Not Adjust Your Set and Monty Python's Flying Circus (particularly the Eleanor Rigby sequence), as well as the Schoolhouse Rock vignettes for ABC and similar-looking animation in early seasons of Sesame Street and The Electric Company. (Only one of the animation staff of Yellow Submarine, Ron Campbell, contributed subsequent animation to the Children's Television Workshop.) Edelmann decided to constantly switch up the visual techniques and art direction every five minutes in order to keep the audience engaged and prevent the film from feeling like a standard cartoon.

The Beatles' animated personas were based on their appearance during the Sgt Pepper's press party at manager Brian Epstein's house, on 19 May 1967.

=== Music ===
In addition to the 1966 title song "Yellow Submarine", several complete or excerpted songs, four previously unreleased, were used in the film. The songs included "All Together Now", "Eleanor Rigby", "It's All Too Much", "Baby, You're a Rich Man" (which had first appeared as the B-side to "All You Need Is Love" in July 1967), "Only a Northern Song" (originally recorded during sessions for Sgt. Pepper's Lonely Hearts Club Band) and "Hey Bulldog". Written by Lennon, this last track was cut from the film before it opened in the US. "Hey Bulldog" was restored for the US theatrical and home video reissue in 1999. The film also includes several references to songs not included in the soundtrack, including "A Day in the Life", the lyrics of which are referenced in the "Sea of Holes" scene; the orchestral breaks earlier in the film are also taken from the song.

The film's instrumental music was an orchestral score composed and arranged by George Martin. One of the film's cues, heard after the main title credits, was originally recorded during sessions for "Good Night" (a track on The Beatles, also known as the "White Album") and would have been used as the introduction to Ringo Starr's White Album composition "Don't Pass Me By". The same cue was later released as "A Beginning" on the 1996 Beatles compilation Anthology 3.

== Soundtrack ==
=== Musical numbers ===
All tracks written by Lennon–McCartney except where noted.

Track start and end time is indicated in hrs:mins:secs. These are approximated because the songs are embedded in the film plot and cannot be strictly separated.

1. 0:21–2:15: "Introduction Story" music by George Martin
2. 7:55–10:40: "Yellow Submarine"
3. 10:40–13:30: "Eleanor Rigby"
4. 19:00–19:55: "Love You To" (George Harrison) (excerpt, played during George's entrance)
5. 22:30–23:05: "A Day in the Life" (excerpt, orchestral swell, starting as the submarine takes off)
6. 23:25–25:55: "All Together Now"
7. 28:20–31:15: "When I'm Sixty-Four"
8. 31:30–34:30: "Only a Northern Song" (Harrison)
9. 43:15–46:15: "Nowhere Man"
10. 48:00–51:30: "Lucy in the Sky with Diamonds"
11. 54:30–54:50: "Yellow Submarine" (a short vocal excerpt when Ringo finds the green hole that leads to Pepperland)
12. 56:15–56:25: "Think for Yourself" (Harrison) (short excerpt, a line is sung a cappella to revive the Lord Mayor)
13. 1:06:35–1:08:50: "Sgt. Pepper's Lonely Hearts Club Band"
14. 1:08:50–1:09:05: "With a Little Help from My Friends" (short excerpt, directly following "Sgt. Pepper's Lonely Hearts Club Band" without interruption, just as on the 1967 album of the same name albeit fading out after a few seconds)
15. 1:11:45–1:15:05: "All You Need Is Love" (abridged)
16. 1:16:30–1:16:40: "Baby, You're a Rich Man" (excerpt; only played on the international versions as Sgt. Pepper's Lonely Hearts Club Band are set free from the anti-music bubble; the instrumental introduction was also added to the 5.1 mix of the restored 1999 UK version)
17. 1:17:25–1:21:00: "Hey Bulldog" (originally shown only in UK before the film's 1999 restoration)
18. 1:24:15–1:27:15: "It's All Too Much" (Harrison) (abridged) (This version is an odd yet not really noticeable hodgepodge of the original 8:14 minute mix of the song, which has many a line cut from the song, shortening the official album version of It’s All Too Much to 6:26. One of the cut lines is used in the film version; that being: “Time for you and me to take this opportunity, Time for me to look at you and you to look at me.”)
19. 1:27:15–1:29:00: "All Together Now (Reprise)" (accompanied by images of the real Beatles singing, numbers and letters, and "all together now" translated in various languages)

==== Music notes ====
- The songs "Nowhere Man" and "Eleanor Rigby" were previously used on the Beatles animated series.
- During "All You Need is Love", the lyrics coming out of John's mouth harkens back to the sing-along segments of the animated series.
- During the musical sequences, the characters shown singing do not always correspond to the performers on the original recordings. Ringo in particular is often shown singing alongside the other Beatles, even though Starr did not sing on those tracks. Conversely, at the beginning of “With a Little Help from My Friends”, the other Beatles introduce John as the singer “Billy Shears”, whereas the vocals are actually performed by Starr, who was Billy Shears on the Sgt. Pepper's Lonely Hearts Club Band album.

=== First soundtrack album ===
The original soundtrack album comprised the four new Beatles songs, two other Beatles songs (the title song and "All You Need Is Love"), and orchestral pieces by George Martin.

The orchestral pieces were also used in the short NASA Apollo 9 mission films, which were part of the series that NASA made for every mission.

=== Second soundtrack album ===
On 14 September 1999, United Artists and Apple Records digitally remixed the audio of the film for a highly successful theatrical and home video re-release. Though the visuals were not digitally restored, a new transfer was done after cleaning the original film negative and rejuvenating the colour. A soundtrack album for this version was also released, which featured the first extensive digital stereo remixes of Beatles material. The 1999 album contained all of the Beatles' songs from the film except "A Day in the Life".

== Release ==
=== Original theatrical run ===
The world premiere of Yellow Submarine took place at the London Pavilion in London on 17 July 1968, attended by all four Beatles. Its first U.S. screening was held at the San Francisco International Film Festival on 2 October 1968. The film's U.S. theatrical premiere took place in Los Angeles at the County Museum of Art on 12 November. Regular screenings began the following day at the Village Theatre in Westwood, Los Angeles, and at the Forum and Tower East theaters in Manhattan, New York City. The film opened at New York's Radio City Music Hall on 26 November. It was United Artists' third animated feature and its first in 25 years, following Disney's Victory Through Air Power (1943).

=== Alternate versions ===
The film was distributed worldwide by United Artists in two versions. The version originally shown in the United Kingdom differs from the version distributed internationally. The most notable difference is its inclusion of the song "Hey Bulldog" that is missing in the international theatrical version. It has been replaced by a shorter battle scene where the people of Pepperland, led by the Beatles, attack and defeat the Blue Meanies. It was felt that, at the time, American audiences would grow tired from the length of the film.

Other differences are several alternate shots in "All You Need Is Love", the liberation of Sgt. Pepper's Lonely Hearts Club Band from the glass ball and a small additional shot of Jeremy after his liberation. The international version also includes the Beatles song "Baby, You're A Rich Man" during the liberation of the alter-ego Beatles which was missing from the original UK version; the instrumental introduction was, however, added to the 5.1 mix of the restored UK cut released in 1999.

The restored UK version runs approximately 89 minutes, compared with approximately 87 minutes for the original UK theatrical release and 85 minutes for the shorter international version.

In the original version, the final on-screen text reads "Released through United Artists" in the bottom-right corner. This notice was removed beginning with the 1999 restoration.

=== Re-releases ===
In 1999, prior to the release of the restored version on VHS and DVD, the film received a limited theatrical re-release, distributed by UIP in the United Kingdom and United Artists in the United States. It premiered in Liverpool on 30 August, designated "Yellow Submarine Day" during the annual International Beatleweek, before opening in selected UK cinemas on 3 September. Screenings at Seattle's Egyptian Theatre and Boston's Brattle Theater, beginning on 1 September and presented in DTS digital stereo sound, marked the first time the restored "Hey Bulldog" animated sequence was shown theatrically in the United States.

Prior to its release on DVD and Blu-ray, the newly restored version also received a limited theatrical run in the United States beginning on 5 May 2012, distributed by D&E Entertainment.

For the 50th anniversary of the movie in 2018, it was screened in the UK and Ireland for one day on 8 July 2018 by Picturehouse Cinemas, and in the US from 8 July 2018 by Abramorama.

== Reception ==
=== Box office ===
The film was commercially more successful in the United States than in the United Kingdom. In Britain, The Rank Organisation withdrew the film from several of its cinemas after disappointing ticket sales, with some exhibitors considering it unsuitable for children. At the Odeon in Wood Green, London, it was replaced by Disney's Peter Pan. United Artists disputed Rank's decision, citing strong attendance at the London Pavilion, where the film had taken more than £20,000 in less than three weeks.

Worldwide, the film earned more than $8 million during its original release. In the United States, the film went on to earn $3 million in film rentals, according to a January 1970 Variety box-office chart. For its 50th-anniversary re-release in 2018, the film grossed $993,385 in the United States, $281,324 in the United Kingdom, and $834 in Australia, for a worldwide total of $1,275,543, according to The Numbers.

=== Critical response ===
Yellow Submarine received widespread critical acclaim. Released in the midst of the psychedelic pop culture of the 1960s, the film drew in moviegoers both for its lush, wildly creative images and its soundtrack of Beatles songs.

On Rotten Tomatoes, the film holds a 97% approval rating based on 57 reviews, with an average rating of 7.9/10. The website's critical consensus states: "A joyful, phantasmagoric blend of colourful animation and the music of the Beatles, Yellow Submarine is delightful (and occasionally melancholy) family fare". On Metacritic, the film has a weighted average score of 78 out of 100, based on 17 critics, indicating "generally favourable reviews".

Roger Ebert of the Chicago Sun-Times praised the film for its creative animation and screenplay, giving it three and a half stars in his original review, saying "Yellow Submarine, curiously enough, exists on two levels with nothing in between. It is beautifully simple and childlike on one level, and erudite and deep on another." He later upgraded the film to a full 4 stars, hailing it a masterpiece of animation, and believed that it "boasts the best soundtrack out of any other animated film." He later placed it on his The Great Movies list.

=== The Beatles' reaction ===
The Beatles celebrated the release of the film in July 1968 with a submarine-themed disco, which was attended by guests all wearing yellow, at the Royal Lancaster Hotel in Bayswater, London. Despite their initial reservations, the Beatles enjoyed the film when they saw it, and both John Lennon and Paul McCartney expressed regret that they had not been more involved in its production. They all liked the voices used for the other Beatles, but none was particularly fond of the voice chosen for their own character.

In a 1980 interview, John Lennon said of the film, "I think it's a great movie, it's my favourite Beatle movie. Sean loves it now, all the little children love it".

Paul McCartney later said that he had hoped Yellow Submarine would be a more traditional animated film, citing Disney productions such as Pinocchio, Snow White and the Seven Dwarfs, and Bambi as models. He felt that the finished film lacked the ingenuity, warmth, and sense of magic he associated with Disney, describing it as a collection of clever sequences that ultimately failed to draw him in.

George Harrison said, “I liked the film. It’s usually been a film for kids, for four or five year olds. I think each generation of kids enjoys it. For some people of my age, it may be a classic. Maybe they just enjoy hearing the music again.”

Ringo Starr particularly enjoyed the film, although he reportedly complained that his character's nose was not long enough and repeatedly asked the director if it could be altered. It was too late to make changes, however, and the nose remained unchanged. He later recalled, “I loved Yellow Submarine. I thought it was very innovative. The thing with the film that still blows me away is that in the first year it was out I had all these kids coming up to me saying, ‘Why did you press the button?’ In the film, I press a button and get shot out of the submarine and kids from all over the bloody world kept shouting, ‘Why did you press the button?’ at me as if it was real. They actually thought it was me.”

== Tie-in publications ==
=== Novelisation ===
A novelisation of Yellow Submarine, written by Max Wilk, was published in 1968 by New American Library in the United States and New English Library in the United Kingdom. Titled Yellow Submarine: Nothing Is Real in its American edition, the 128-page book was illustrated with colour frame captures from the film and the novelisation included some deviations from the finished film.

=== Other publications ===
In 1968, World Distributors published The Yellow Submarine Gift Book, an illustrated hardcover book based on the film, while Pyramid Publications published The Official Beatles Yellow Submarine Magazine, a 48-page magazine that included a storybook adaptation of the film's script with full-colour illustrations. Gold Key Comics also published a comic book adaptation of the film.

== Rights and distribution ==
The opening credits include 1968 copyright notices for The Hearst Corporation (King Features Syndicate Division) and Subafilms Ltd. Of all the Beatles films released by United Artists, Yellow Submarine had been the only one to which UA retained the rights, leading up to its purchase by Metro-Goldwyn-Mayer in 1981. In 1994, Subafilms acquired all rights to the film from Hearst, becoming its sole copyright owner. In 2005, Sony Pictures Entertainment led a consortium that purchased MGM and UA. SPE handled theatrical distribution for MGM until 2012. 20th Century Fox Home Entertainment was responsible for home video distribution when the most recent home video release went out of print until 30 June 2020.

The restored film was released digitally worldwide on the iTunes Store on 5 June 2012, alongside the Blu-ray and DVD editions. It is also available digitally through the Apple TV app. Amazon negotiated exclusive streaming rights to the film via its Prime Video service, starting 13 July 2018 in the UK, the US, Canada, Germany, Spain, France and Italy under a deal with Apple Corps. The companies declined to disclose the length of Amazon's exclusive rights.

== Home media ==
With the dawn of the home-video era came an opportunity to release Yellow Submarine on VHS and LaserDisc. However, it was held up by United Artists for some years over music-rights issues. Coinciding with the CD release of the soundtrack album, the film was issued on home video in the United Kingdom on 28 August 1987 by Warner Home Video and in the United States on 20 October 1987 by MGM/UA Home Video. To the disappointment of fans in the UK, the film was presented in its US theatrical version, thereby omitting the "Hey Bulldog" scene. The video was discontinued around 1990, and for many years copies of the original VHS issue were considered collectables.

On 14 September 1999, then-rights holders Metro-Goldwyn-Mayer and Apple reissued the film for the first time on VHS and DVD (and VCDs mainly in Asia) using restoration techniques of the time. The sound was remixed to Dolby 5.1, and the film was re-edited to its European theatrical version, with the "Hey Bulldog" number restored. This DVD release also featured a music-only audio track, without spoken dialogue, leaving only the music and the songs, in addition to the German and Italian theatrical dubs. The extras included the featurette The Mod Odyssey, three storyboarded sequences (including two not used in the film), original pencil drawings, interviews with crew members and voice cast, and a collectible booklet. This version (released by MGM Home Entertainment, which was available exclusively through Warner Home Video worldwide) went out of print once the rights reverted to Apple Corps. The 1999 edition opened with the 1994 United Artists logo and concluded with restoration credits, followed by the Apple Films logo and the closing United Artists logo.

=== Restoration ===
On 20 March 2012, Apple Corps announced that the film had been restored to 4K by hand for DVD and Blu-ray release on 28 May 2012 (29 May in North America), later delayed one week to 4 June 2012 (5 June in North America). The release was distributed by EMI in the United Kingdom and by Capitol Records in the United States, and included the bonus features from the previous DVD edition. The 2012 release omits the United Artists credits, featuring only the Apple Films logo. Apple stated: "The film's soundtrack album will be reissued on CD in 2009. The film has been restored in 4K digital resolution for the first time – all done by hand, frame by frame". The delicate restoration was supervised by Paul Rutan Jr and his team, which included Chris Dusendschon, Rayan Raghuram and Randy Walker. No automated software was used to clean up the film's repaired and digitised photo-chemical elements. The work was done by hand, a single frame at a time, by 40 to 60 trained digital artists, over several months.

For the 30th anniversary of the film, the soundtrack and score were remixed in 5.1 stereo surround sound at Abbey Road Studios by mix engineer Peter Corbin. The audio changed the versions of the songs, the orchestra music from the film version to soundtrack version, and added in more cartoon sound effects for it to feel more cartoony.

== Awards and honours ==
- 1968 New York Film Critics Circle Awards Special Award
- 1969 Hugo Award for Best Dramatic Presentation (nominated)
- 1970 Grammy Award for Best Original Score Written for a Motion Picture or a Television Special (nominated)

== Cancelled related projects ==
=== Spiritual sequel ===
In 1985, Al Brodax teamed up with the New York Institute of Technology Computer Graphics Lab to produce a spiritual sequel of sorts to Yellow Submarine titled Strawberry Fields (based on the song Strawberry Fields Forever). The film was intended to be entirely CGI, but due to the complexities of the technology of the time, it was decided to render only backgrounds and objects in this style, while all the characters would utilize traditional animation. The film was also supposedly going to utilize clips from the unproduced animated film The Works. Contrary to popular belief, Don Bluth was not involved in the production, though Jeff Merghart, who worked on An American Tail, was involved as a key animator. His artwork, which resembles the style of his colleague Bluth, was used as the basis for the character designs.

Due to Apple Records no longer owning the rights to the songs, the catalogue would have featured cover versions such as Michael Jackson's version of "Come Together", Cyndi Lauper's version of "Across the Universe", Crosby, Stills & Nash's cover of "Blackbird", Robert Palmer's cover of "Baby, You're A Rich Man", Siedah Garrett's cover of "Hey Jude", Cheap Trick's cover of "Magical Mystery Tour", Luther Vandross's cover of "Michelle" and Stevie Ray Vaughan's cover of "Taxman".

At some point in between 1990 and 1992, Brodax left the project and was replaced with Dutch director Rene Daalder. One of the other concept artists for the film was Polish painter Jacek Yerka, who was hired to create figures, monster-machines and unreal landscapes. Several of his paintings such as Broken Picnic, Technobeach and Creation Of Life were originally meant for Strawberry Fields.

The plot centered on an amateur detective named Jude who teams up with a woman named Michelle Ma'belle to reacquire King Maxwell's Silver Hammer from the Evil Walrus and his Eggmen. And along the way they would have met Flattop, Bungalow Bill, Rocky Raccoon, Mean Mr. Mustard, a blue snake named Oo Bla Dee, Oo Bla Da, Jojo and The Fool.

Production drawings for the film resurfaced in 2019, and in 2024, a work-in-progress reel was found and was put up on the Internet Archive. In 2026, a pitch trailer, 300 pages of storyboards and cast listing involving Chuck McCann as Walrus, Deborah Winger as Michelle and Steve Guttenberg as Jude were found.

=== CGI remake ===
In August 2009, Variety reported that Walt Disney Pictures and filmmaker Robert Zemeckis were negotiating to produce a computer-animated remake of the film. Motion capture was to be used, as with Zemeckis' previous animated films The Polar Express (2004) and Beowulf (2007). Variety also indicated that Disney hoped to release the film in time for the 2012 Summer Olympics in London. Disney and Apple Corps officially announced the remake at the inaugural D23 Expo on 11 September 2009.

Comedian Peter Serafinowicz was cast to voice Paul, Dean Lennox Kelly as John, Cary Elwes as George, Adam Campbell as Ringo and David Tennant was in talks to voice the Chief Blue Meanie. California-based Beatles tribute band the Fab Four was cast to perform the performance capture animation for the animated Beatles.

In May 2010, Disney shuttered Zemeckis' digital film studio ImageMovers Digital after poor box-office performance of A Christmas Carol (2009). On 14 March 2011, Disney abandoned the project, citing catastrophic opening weekend results of Simon Wells' Mars Needs Moms. Criticism toward motion capture technology was also factor.

After its cancellation at Disney, Zemeckis tried to pitch the remake to other studios like New Line Cinema, with Warner Bros. set to distribute it. By December 2012, Zemeckis expressed that he had lost interest in the project, stating: "That would have been great to bring the Beatles back to life. But it's probably better not to be remade – you're always behind the 8-ball when do you [sic] a remake".

In 2021, footage of the remake surfaced online, revealing that the film would have potentially utilized soundbites from the original and even recreate certain scenes. One of the more notable differences was a sequence during Ringo's introduction where he was going to be tempted by a siren presumably created by the Blue Meanies.

== In popular culture ==
- In 1969, Corgi Toys issued a licensed die-cast toy model of the Yellow Submarine. A lightly modified version was reissued as a collector's item by Corgi Classics in 1999.
- In 1971, the year after the Beatles' breakup, Doubleday published We Love You Beatles, a children's picture book written and illustrated by British author Margaret Sutton. The book briefly summarizes the band's career and features a psychedelic graphic style and themes of love that reference the film Yellow Submarine.
- In the 1978 mockumentary film All You Need Is Cash, the Rutles are featured in a clip from their animated film Yellow Submarine Sandwich performing the song "Cheese and Onions".
- Between 1981 and 1989, Paul McCartney worked on a proposed album titled Return to Pepperland. Several songs such as "Beautiful Night", "P.S. Love Me Do" and "Love Come Tumbling Down" were officially released on albums and singles, but the rest are only available through bootlegs. The title song, "Return To Pepperland" was originally planned to release on a 12" single release but was cancelled for unknown reasons.

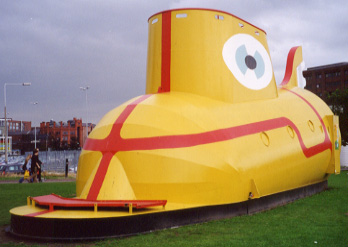
Yellow Submarine sculpture in Chavasse Park, Liverpool

- In 1984, a large-scale sculpture of the Yellow Submarine was constructed for the International Garden Festival in Liverpool. It subsequently stood for some years in Chavasse Park, before being placed in its present location at Liverpool John Lennon Airport in 2005.
- In the 1993 episode of The Simpsons titled "Last Exit to Springfield", Lisa Simpson, under anaesthetic, has a dream sequence highly reminiscent of the film.
- In 1999, McFarlane Toys released a series of action figures based on the film, depicting the Beatles alongside characters and objects from the film. A second series followed in 2000, featuring the Beatles alongside additional characters from the film.
- Professional wrestler the Blue Meanie derived his name and persona from the villains of the film.
- In 2000, Sony Development and Sony Entertainment Berlin opened The Beatles' Yellow Submarine Adventure, an interactive virtual-reality ride based on the film, at the Music Box entertainment centre in Potsdamer Platz, Berlin. The attraction opened to the public on 20 January 2000.
- The 2001 episode of The Powerpuff Girls titled "Meet the Beat Alls", which contains numerous Beatles references, briefly features cameos of the band members' likenesses from Yellow Submarine. One character from the episode resembles Fred from the film.
- A picture book based on the film, illustrated by Heinz Edelmann, was first published by Walker Books in 2004. A further edition was published in 2011, followed by a new paperback edition in 2018 for the film's 50th anniversary. That same year, Walker Books published Yellow Submarine: Panorama Pops, a three-dimensional cut-paper, accordion-fold gift edition.
- In the episode of the animated series Smeshariki – "BallAst", the main characters are swimming in a yellow submarine under water, as well as sounds the arrangement of the song "Yellow Submarine".
- The 2007 film Walk Hard: The Dewey Cox Story features an animated acid-trip sequence that parodies Yellow Submarine.
- The Adult Swim animated series Superjail! frequently makes visual references to Yellow Submarine, which series creator Christy Karacas has stated to be an influence to his visual style.
- The third Futurama film, Bender's Game (2008), makes visual references to Yellow Submarine.
- In the Robot Chicken episode titled "Due to Constraints of Time and Budget", Yellow Submarine is spoofed in a sketch called "Ping Them Back".
- The 2009 rhythm game The Beatles: Rock Band features dreamscapes inspired by the film in the Abbey Road ('66–'67) venue. During “Yellow Submarine”, the band is depicted in the appearance of their animated counterparts, while the submarine also appears with a different design. The background for “Sgt. Pepper’s Lonely Hearts Club Band” is inspired by Pepperland, and Jeremy, Max, and the Foothills of the Headlands appear in the venue's final cutscene.
- In the 2010 episode of Family Guy titled "Something, Something, Something, Dark Side", when Lois Griffin as Princess Leia becomes angry with Peter Griffin as Han Solo for driving the ship into an asteroid field, he says, "It was either this or the Strawberry Fields!" This leads to a cutaway gag that features the band members in their Yellow Submarine likenesses floating in the space, surrounded by giant strawberries.
- In 2010, the official music video for "Your Love Is My Drug" by American pop recording artist Ke$ha features digital animation sequences, making visual references to Yellow Submarine.
- In 2012, Factory Entertainment released a limited-edition set of four action figures depicting the Beatles as they appear in the film. The 12-inch figures were individually packaged and came with film-inspired accessories. Factory Entertainment also released a set of four 12-inch plush figures depicting the Beatles in their Yellow Submarine appearances.
- In 2014, apparel company Vans released a series of shoes based on Yellow Submarine.
- In 2016, for the 50th anniversary of the original song's release, the die-cast toy car brand Hot Wheels released a miniature replica of the Yellow Submarine from the film, as well as an assortment of six toy cars featuring imagery from the film.
- In 2016, Lego Ideas released a Yellow Submarine Lego set that includes minifigures of the four Beatles and Jeremy Hillary Boob, along with the submarine.
- In 2016, Titan Merchandise released a line of Yellow Submarine TITANS vinyl collectibles, including 3-inch figures of the Beatles in their animated forms and Sgt. Pepper outfits, as well as the Chief Blue Meanie, the Yellow Submarine and other characters. In 2017, Titan Merchandise released the All Together Now collection, a second wave of 3-inch blind-boxed TITANS featuring additional versions of the Beatles, Blue Meanies and other characters and variants from the film.
- In 2018, Titan Comics published an authorized graphic novel adaptation of the film by Bill Morrison, completing a project he had originally begun for Dark Horse Comics in 1998.
- In 2019, Fisher-Price released a Little People figure set featuring the Beatles styled after their appearances in Yellow Submarine.
- In the 2019 Marvel Cinematic Universe film Avengers: Endgame, Tony Stark jokingly refers to his shipmate Nebula as a "Blue Meanie".
- In The Big Lez Show season 3 finale, the main characters consume a plant named the "Blue Meanie", and it having a psychedelic effect. In the season 4 finale, "Choomah Island 3 – Denouement", Sassy and Donny go on a trip reminiscent of this film and encounter John Lennon.
- In early July 2022, artist Igor Fridrih Petković with the support of the Exit Foundation recreated the top of the Yellow Submarine on one of the piers of the former Prince Andrew Bridge (also known as the Emperor Franz Joseph Bridge) on the Danube river in Novi Sad, Serbia. The art installation was planned to remain for over a year and was a part of the world peace thematic of the 2022 Exit Music Festival. It was slightly damaged during the 2023 summer storms that ravaged Southern Europe, with the submarine periscope falling due to heavy winds.
- In 2023, Apple released an ad promoting the iPhone 14 titled "Hello Yellow", that makes visual references to Yellow Submarine. It has surpassed 20 million views on YouTube.
- On 28 January 2025, Crocs did a collaboration with the Beatles and released two Classic Clogs and Jibbitz accessories based on the Yellow Submarine artwork.

== See also ==
- The Beatles in film
- List of animated feature-length films
- List of fictional submarines
- List of films related to the hippie subculture

== Bibliography ==
- Hieronimus, Dr Robert; Cortner, Laura (2002). Inside the Yellow Submarine. Iola, Wisconsin, USA: Krause Publications. ISBN 978-0873493604.
- Matteo, Steve (2023). Act Naturally. Rowman & Littlefield. ISBN 978-1-4930-5902-7.
