= Greg Davis (musician) =

American electronic musician

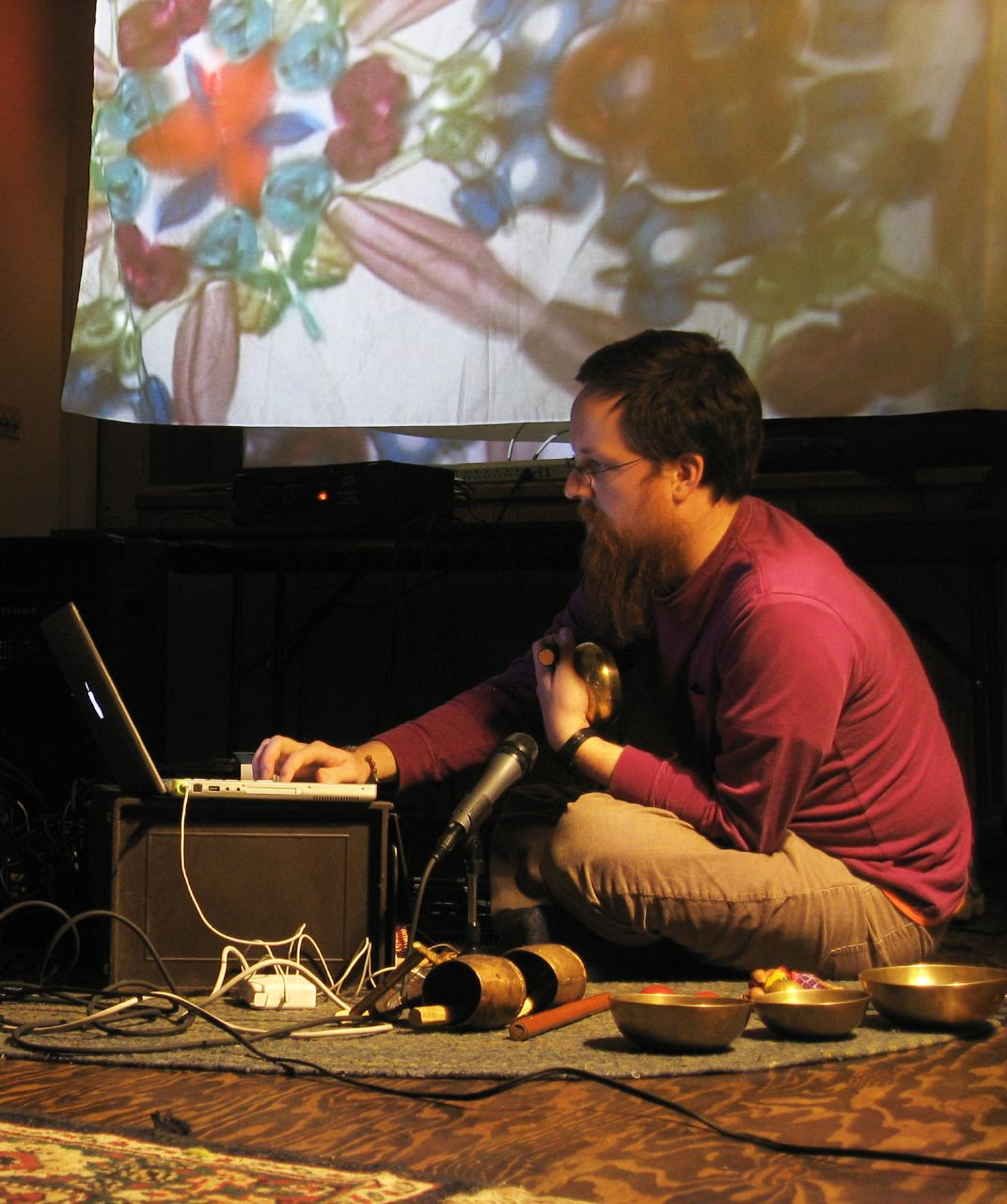
- Davis at Higgins Alley in Missoula, Montana, June 2006

Background information
- Born: November 8, 1975 (age 49)
- Origin: Burlington, Vermont, U.S.
- Genres: Electronic music ambient music experimental music
- Instrument(s): computer, synth, guitar, keyboard, percussion, world instruments, vocals
- Years active: 2000-present
- Labels: Carpark, Autumn Records, Kranky

Gregory Tyler Davis is an American electronic musician who has recorded albums drawing from a wide variety of sources, including guitar, field recording, various world/ethnic/traditional instruments, percussion, and voice, all processed through digital manipulation.

After years of experience in hip-hop groups, jazz combos, free improvisation, and experimental composition, Davis moved toward computer-based music in 1997. At Depaul University in Chicago, he studied classical and jazz guitar alongside composition and jazz studies.

In 2017, Davis opened Autumn Records in Winooski, VT.
