= Outline of the Beatles =

Overview of and topical guide to the Beatles

The Beatles
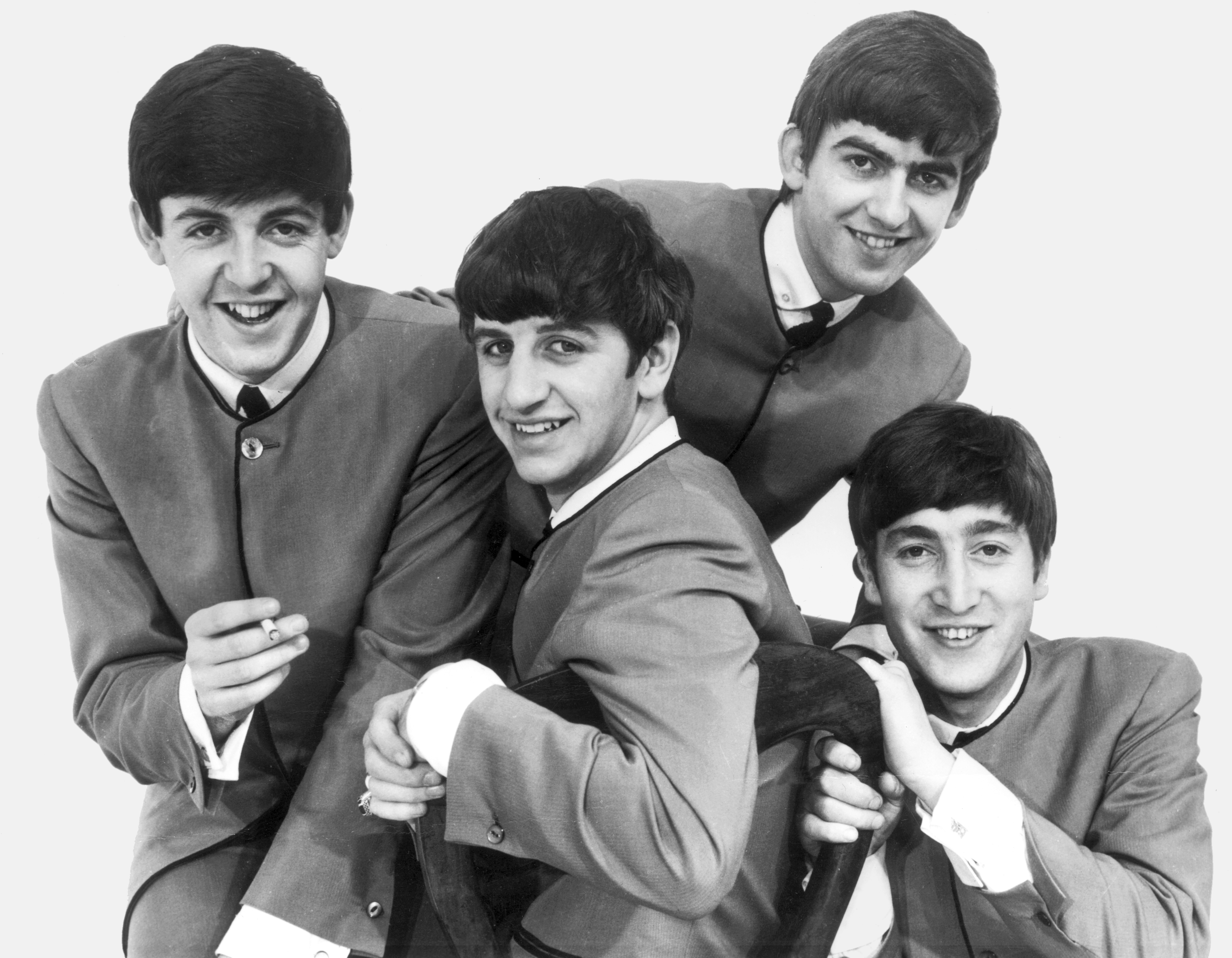
- The Beatles in 1963; From left: Paul McCartney, Ringo Starr, George Harrison and John Lennon

Background information
- Origin: Liverpool, England
- Genres: Rock; pop; beat; psychedelia
- Works: Albums; singles; songs; covers; film; recording sessions; performances
- Years active: 1960–1970
- Labels: Polydor; Parlophone; Tollie; Vee-Jay; Capitol; Swan; Odeon; MGM; Atco; United Artists; Apple
- Spinoff of: The Quarrymen
- Awards: Full list
- Past members: John Lennon; Paul McCartney; George Harrison; Ringo Starr; (see § Members for others)
- Website: thebeatles.com

The following outline is provided as an overview of and topical guide to the Wikipedia articles available about the Beatles from their formation through to their break-up; it does not include information about members' solo careers.

The Beatles were an English rock band formed in Liverpool in 1960. The band comprised John Lennon, Paul McCartney, George Harrison and Ringo Starr. They are regarded as the most influential band in popular music and were integral to the development of 1960s counterculture and the recognition of popular music as an art form. Rooted in skiffle, beat and 1950s rock 'n' roll, their sound incorporated elements of classical music and traditional pop in innovative ways. They also explored styles ranging from folk and Indian music to psychedelia and hard rock. As pioneers in recording, songwriting and artistic presentation, the Beatles revolutionised many aspects of the music industry and were often portrayed as leaders of the era's youth and sociocultural movements.

== Overview main articles ==
- The Beatles
  - John Lennon
  - Paul McCartney
  - George Harrison
  - Ringo Starr
- George Martin

=== History ===
- The Beatles timeline
- The Beatles in Bangor
- Break-up of the Beatles
- The Beatles in Hamburg
- The Beatles' North American releases
- The Beatles at the Cavern Club
- The Beatles' Decca audition
- The Beatles in India
- Lennon–McCartney
- More popular than Jesus
- Paul is dead
- Religious views of the Beatles
- Recording practices of the Beatles

=== Background ===
- British Invasion
- The Quarrymen

== Performances ==
- The Beatles' rooftop concert
- The Beatles on The Ed Sullivan Show
- The Beatles at Shea Stadium
- Pop Go the Beatles

== Production, management, distribution ==
- Geoff Emerick
- Brian Epstein
- Terry Doran
- Mal Evans
- Alistair Taylor
- Derek Taylor
- Allan Williams
- Calderstone Productions
- Apple Records
- Northern Songs
- Norman Smith (record producer)
- Allen Klein
- Ron Richards
- Seltaeb
- Startling Music
- Swan Records
- Tollie Records
- United Artists
- United Artists Records
- Vee-Jay Records

== Media ==
=== Albums ===
- Please Please Me
- With the Beatles
- A Hard Day's Night (album)
- Beatles for Sale
- Help!
- Rubber Soul
- Revolver (Beatles album)
- Sgt. Pepper's Lonely Hearts Club Band
- The Beatles (album)
- Yellow Submarine (album)
- Abbey Road
- Let It Be (Beatles album)

==== Non-British releases ====
- Hey Jude (Beatles album)
- Yesterday and Today
- Something New (Beatles album)
- Introducing... The Beatles
- Beatles '65
- Beatles VI
- Meet the Beatles!
- The Beatles' Second Album
- Twist and Shout (album)
- The Beatles' Story
- The Beatles' Long Tall Sally
- Magical Mystery Tour (LP in the United States)

==== EPs ====
- 4 by the Beatles
- All My Loving (EP)
- The Beatles (No. 1)
- Beatles for Sale (EP)
- Beatles for Sale No. 2
- The Beatles' Hits
- The Beatles' Million Sellers
- Extracts from the Album A Hard Day's Night
- Extracts from the Film A Hard Day's Night
- Four by the Beatles
- Long Tall Sally (EP)
- Magical Mystery Tour (Double EP in the United Kingdom)
- My Bonnie
- Nowhere Man (EP)
- Souvenir of Their Visit to America
- Twist and Shout (EP)
- Yesterday (Beatles EP)

==== Soundtracks ====
- A Hard Day's Night (album)
- Help!
- Magical Mystery Tour
- Yellow Submarine (album)
- Yellow Submarine Songtrack
- Let It Be (Beatles album)
- Across the Universe (soundtrack)
- Love (Beatles album)

=== Singles ===
- The Beatles singles discography
- Past Masters

=== Individual songs ===
- 12-Bar Original
- Across the Universe
- Act Naturally
- Ain't She Sweet
- All for Love (Beatles song)
- All I've Got to Do
- All My Loving
- All Things Must Pass (song)
- All Together Now (Beatles song)
- All You Need Is Love
- And I Love Her
- And Your Bird Can Sing
- Anna (Go to Him)
- Another Girl
- Any Time at All
- Ask Me Why
- Baby It's You
- Baby, You're a Rich Man
- Baby's in Black
- Back in the U.S.S.R.
- Bad Boy (Larry Williams song)
- Bad to Me
- The Ballad of John and Yoko
- Be-Bop-a-Lula
- The Beatles' Movie Medley
- Beautiful Dreamer
- Because (Beatles song)
- Being for the Benefit of Mr. Kite!
- Bésame Mucho
- Birthday (Beatles song)
- Blackbird (Beatles song)
- Blue Jay Way
- Boys (The Shirelles song)
- Can You Take Me Back
- Can't Buy Me Love
- Carnival of Light
- Carol (Chuck Berry song)
- Carry That Weight
- Cayenne (instrumental)
- Chains (Cookies song)
- Christmas Time (Is Here Again)
- Clarabella (song)
- Come and Get It (Badfinger song)
- Come Together
- Commonwealth (song)
- The Continuing Story of Bungalow Bill
- Cry Baby Cry
- Crying, Waiting, Hoping
- A Day in the Life
- Day Tripper
- Dear Prudence
- Devil in His Heart
- Dig a Pony
- Dig It (Beatles song)
- Dizzy, Miss Lizzy
- Do You Want to Know a Secret
- Doctor Robert
- Don't Bother Me
- Don't Ever Change (song)
- Don't Let Me Down (Beatles song)
- Don't Pass Me By
- Drive My Car (song)
- Eight Days a Week
- Eleanor Rigby
- The End (Beatles song)
- Etcetera (song)
- Every Little Thing (Beatles song)
- Everybody Had a Hard Year
- Everybody's Got Something to Hide Except Me and My Monkey
- Everybody's Trying to Be My Baby
- Fixing a Hole
- Flying (Beatles instrumental)
- The Fool on the Hill
- Fools like Me
- For No One
- For You Blue
- Free as a Bird
- From Me to You
- Get Back
- Getting Better
- Girl (Beatles song)
- Glass Onion (song)
- Golden Slumbers
- Good Day Sunshine
- Good Morning Good Morning
- Good Night (Beatles song)
- Got to Get You into My Life
- Hallelujah I Love Her So
- Happiness Is a Warm Gun
- A Hard Day's Night (song)
- Hello Little Girl
- Hello, Goodbye
- Help! (song)
- Helter Skelter (song)
- Her Majesty (song)
- Here Comes the Sun
- Here, There and Everywhere
- Hey Bulldog
- Hey Jude
- Hey-Hey-Hey-Hey!
- Hippy Hippy Shake
- Hiroshima Sky is Always Blue
- Hold Me Tight
- Honey Don't
- Honey Pie
- How Do You Do It?
- I Am the Walrus
- I Call Your Name
- I Don't Want to Spoil the Party
- I Feel Fine
- I Forgot to Remember to Forget
- I Got a Woman
- I Got to Find My Baby
- I Just Don't Understand
- I Me Mine
- I Need You (Beatles song)
- I Saw Her Standing There
- I Should Have Known Better
- I Wanna Be Your Man
- I Want to Hold Your Hand
- I Want to Tell You
- I Want You (She's So Heavy)
- I Will
- I'll Be Back (song)
- I'll Be on My Way
- I'll Cry Instead
- I'll Follow the Sun
- I'll Get You
- I'm a Loser
- I'm Down
- I'm Gonna Sit Right Down and Cry (Over You)
- I'm Happy Just to Dance with You
- I'm Looking Through You
- I'm Only Sleeping
- I'm So Tired
- I've Got a Feeling
- I've Just Seen a Face
- If I Fell
- If I Needed Someone
- If You've Got Trouble
- In My Life
- The Inner Light (song)
- It Won't Be Long
- It's All Too Much
- It's Only Love
- Johnny B. Goode
- Julia (Beatles song)
- Junk (song)
- Kansas City (Leiber and Stoller song)
- Keep Your Hands off My Baby
- Komm, gib mir deine Hand / Sie liebt dich
- Lady Madonna
- Leave My Kitten Alone
- Lend Me Your Comb
- Let It Be (song)
- Like Dreamers Do
- Little Child
- Lonesome Tears in My Eyes
- The Long and Winding Road
- The Long One
- Long Tall Sally
- Long, Long, Long
- Love Me Do
- Love of the Loved
- Love You To
- Lovely Rita
- Lucille (Little Richard song)
- Lucy in the Sky with Diamonds
- Madman (song)
- Maggie May (folk song)
- Magical Mystery Tour (song)
- Martha My Dear
- Matchbox (song)
- Maxwell's Silver Hammer
- Mean Mr. Mustard
- Memphis, Tennessee (song)
- Michelle (song)
- Midnight Special (song)
- Misery (Beatles song)
- Mr. Moonlight (song)
- Money (That's What I Want)
- Moonlight Bay
- Mother Nature's Son
- My Bonnie Lies over the Ocean
- The Night Before (song)
- No Reply (song)
- Norwegian Wood (This Bird Has Flown)
- Not a Second Time
- Not Guilty (song)
- Nothin' Shakin' (But the Leaves on the Trees)
- Now and Then (Beatles song)
- Nowhere Man (song)
- Ob-La-Di, Ob-La-Da
- Octopus's Garden
- Oh! Darling
- Old Brown Shoe
- One After 909
- One and One Is Two
- Only a Northern Song
- Ooh! My Soul
- P.S. I Love You (Beatles song)
- The Palace of the King of the Birds
- Paperback Writer
- Los Paranoias
- Peace of Mind/The Candle Burns
- Penny Lane
- Piggies
- Please Mr. Postman
- Please Please Me (song)
- Polythene Pam
- Rain (Beatles song)
- Real Love (Beatles song)
- Revolution (Beatles song)
- Revolution 9
- Rock and Roll Music (song)
- Rocky Raccoon
- Roll Over Beethoven
- Run for Your Life (Beatles song)
- Save the Last Dance for Me
- Savoy Truffle
- Searchin'
- September in the Rain
- Sexy Sadie
- Sgt. Pepper's Lonely Hearts Club Band (Reprise)
- Sgt. Pepper's Lonely Hearts Club Band (song)
- She Came In Through the Bathroom Window
- She Loves You
- She Said She Said
- She's a Woman
- She's Leaving Home
- The Sheik of Araby
- Sheila (Tommy Roe song)
- A Shot of Rhythm and Blues
- Slow Down (Larry Williams song)
- Soldier of Love (Lay Down Your Arms)
- Some Other Guy
- Something (Beatles song)
- Song of Love (song)
- Sour Milk Sea
- Step Inside Love
- Strawberry Fields Forever
- Sun King (song)
- Sure to Fall (in Love with You)
- Suzy Parker (Beatles Song)
- Sweet Little Sixteen
- Take Good Care of My Baby
- A Taste of Honey (song)
- Taxman
- Teddy Boy (song)
- Tell Me What You See
- Tell Me Why (Beatles song)
- Thank You Girl
- That Means a Lot
- That's All Right
- There's a Place
- Things We Said Today
- Think for Yourself
- Thinking of Linking
- This Boy
- Three Cool Cats
- Ticket to Ride (song)
- Till There Was You
- To Know Him Is to Love Him
- Tomorrow Never Knows
- Too Much Monkey Business
- Twist and Shout
- Two of Us (Beatles song)
- Wait (Beatles song)
- Watching Rainbows
- We Can Work It Out
- What Goes On (Beatles song)
- What You're Doing
- What's the New Mary Jane
- When I Get Home
- When I'm Sixty-Four
- Where Have You Been (All My Life)
- While My Guitar Gently Weeps
- Why Don't We Do It in the Road?
- Wild Honey Pie
- With a Little Help from My Friends
- Within You Without You
- The Word (song)
- Words of Love
- A World Without Love
- Yellow Submarine (song)
- Yer Blues
- Yes It Is
- Yesterday (song)
- You Can't Do That
- You Know My Name (Look Up the Number)
- You Know What to Do
- You Like Me Too Much
- You Never Give Me Your Money
- You Won't See Me
- You'll Be Mine (Beatles song)
- You're Going to Lose That Girl
- You've Got to Hide Your Love Away
- You've Really Got a Hold on Me
- Young Blood (The Coasters song)
- Your Mother Should Know

==== Anthology ====
- Cayenne (instrumental)
- Free as a Bird
- 12-Bar Original
- Hello Little Girl
- If You've Got Trouble
- In Spite of All the Danger
- Like Dreamers Do
- Not Guilty (song)
- Now and Then (John Lennon song)
- Real Love (Beatles song)
- That Means a Lot
- You Know What to Do
- You'll Be Mine (Beatles song)

=== Compilations ===
==== Greatest hits ====
- 1 (Beatles album)
- 20 Greatest Hits (Beatles album)
- 1962–1966 ("Red Album")
- 1967–1970 ("Blue Album")
- Greatest Hits Volume 1 (Beatles album)
- Greatest Hits Volume 2 (Beatles album)
- The Number Ones

==== Mono versions ====
- The Beatles in Mono
- The Beatles Mono Collection
- Mono Masters

==== Early material ====
- In the Beginning (Circa 1960)
- First Live Recordings
- A Collection of Beatles Oldies
- The Early Beatles
- The Beatles Bootleg Recordings 1963
- The Beatles (The Original Studio Recordings)
- Hear the Beatles Tell All
- The Beatles' Story
- Live! at the Star-Club in Hamburg, Germany; 1962
- The Beatles vs. the Third Reich

===== With Tony Sheridan =====
- Ain't She Sweet (album)
- The Beatles' First
- The Beatles with Tony Sheridan and Their Guests
- The Early Tapes of the Beatles
- In the Beginning (Circa 1960)
- My Bonnie
- Very Together

==== Box sets ====
- The Singles Collection 1962–1970
- The U.S. Albums
- The Japan Box
- The Capitol Albums, Volume 1
- The Capitol Albums, Volume 2
- The Beatles' Christmas records
- The Beatles EP Collection
- The Beatles Box Set
- The Beatles Box
- The Beatles Collection
- The Beatles: The Collection
- The Beatles Mono Collection
- The Beatles (The Original Studio Recordings)
- The Beatles in Mono
- The Beatles: 1964 U.S. Albums in Mono

==== Reissues ====
- Revolver: Special Edition
- Sgt. Pepper's Lonely Hearts Club Band: 50th Anniversary Edition
- Let It Be: Special Edition
- Abbey Road: 50th Anniversary Edition
- The Beatles: 50th Anniversary Edition
- Let It Be... Naked

==== Sessions ====
- Sessions (Beatles album)
- Live at the BBC (Beatles album)
- On Air – Live at the BBC Volume 2

==== Live material ====
- The Beatles at the Hollywood Bowl
- The Beatles Bootleg Recordings 1963
- The Beatles Tapes from the David Wigg Interviews
- The Beatles' rooftop concert
- First Live Recordings
- Live at the BBC (Beatles album)
- Live! at the Star-Club in Hamburg, Germany; 1962
- On Air – Live at the BBC Volume 2
- The Beatles vs. the Third Reich

==== Other ====
- The Beatles & Frank Ifield on Stage
- The Beatles Ballads
- The Beatles Collection
- The Beatles in Italy
- The Beatles vs the Four Seasons
- The Beatles: The Collection
- Compilation Deluxe
- The Essential Beatles
- Jolly What!
- Love Songs (Beatles album)
- Only The Beatles...
- Past Masters
- Por Siempre Beatles
- Rarities (Beatles compilations)
- Reel Music
- Rock 'n' Roll Music (album)
- Tomorrow Never Knows (Beatles album)
- Los Beatles (album)
- Songs, Pictures and Stories of the Fabulous Beatles

=== Album covers ===
- Bob Gibson (artist) (Magical Mystery Tour cover art)
- Klaus Voormann (Revolver cover art)
- List of images on the cover of Sgt. Pepper's Lonely Hearts Club Band

=== Live performances ===
- List of the Beatles' live performances
- The Beatles Winter 1963 Helen Shapiro Tour
- The Beatles' 1964 North American tour
- The Beatles' 1964 world tour
- The Beatles' 1965 European tour
- The Beatles' 1965 UK tour
- The Beatles' 1965 US tour
- The Beatles' 1966 tour of Germany, Japan and the Philippines
- The Beatles' 1966 US tour
- The Beat Ballad Show Tour
- Roy Orbison/The Beatles Tour

=== Films ===
- A Hard Day's Night (film)
- Help! (film)
- Let It Be (1970 film)
- Magical Mystery Tour (film)
- The Beatles: Get Back – The Rooftop Concert
- Yellow Submarine (film)
- The Beatles at Shea Stadium
- The Beatles Anthology (TV series)

== Artists associated with the Beatles ==
- Jeff Lynne
- Billy Preston
- Jimmie Nicol
- Tony Sheridan
- Pete Shotton
- Lord Woodbine
- Pete Best
- Norman Chapman
- Tommy Moore (musician)
- Chas Newby
- Stuart Sutcliffe
- The Quarrymen
- Eric Clapton

== Musical styles ==
- Popular beat combo
- Beat music
- Mersey Beat

== Locations ==
- The Jacaranda and Lord Woodbine
- Cavern Club and Ray McFall
- Penny Lane, Liverpool
- Top Ten Club
- Whaddon House
- 10 Admiral Grove
- 12 Arnold Grove
- 20 Forthlin Road
- 251 Menlove Avenue
- Abbey Road Studios
- Casbah Coffee Club and Mona Best
- St Peter's Church, Woolton, Liverpool
- Strawberry Field

== Cultural impacts ==
=== Books about the Beatles ===
==== Reference works ====
- The Beatles Illustrated Lyrics (1969)
- The Complete Beatles Recording Sessions (1988)
- Recording the Beatles (2006)

==== Primary sources ====
===== Beatles =====
- Lennon Remembers (1970)
- I, Me, Mine (1980)
- Songs by George Harrison (1988)
- Songs by George Harrison 2 (1992)
- Paul McCartney: Many Years from Now (1997)
- Anthology (2000)
- Postcards from the Boys (2004)
- Photograph (2013)
- The Lyrics: 1956 to the Present (2021)
- 1964: Eyes of the Storm (2023)

===== Associates =====
- A Cellarful of Noise (1964)
- The Longest Cocktail Party (1973)
- All You Need Is Ears (1979)
- The Love You Make (1983)
- Ticket to Ride (2003)
- John (2005)
- Magical Mystery Tours (2006)
- Wonderful Today (2007)

==== Biographies ====
- The Authorised Biography (1968)
- Apple to the Core (1972)
- Shout!: The Beatles in Their Generation (1981)
- The Lives of John Lennon (1988)
- Nowhere Man: The Final Days of John Lennon (2000)
- The Biography (2004)
- Can't Buy Me Love (2007)
- You Never Give Me Your Money (2009)
- All These Years (2013–present)
- One Two Three Four: The Beatles in Time (2020)
- Living the Beatles Legend (2023)

==== Critique ====
- An Illustrated Record (1975)
- Revolution in the Head: The Beatles' Records and the Sixties (1994)
- In Their Lives: Great Writers on Great Beatles Songs (2017)

==== Fiction ====
- Beatles (1984)
- The Beatles Experience (1991–1992)
- "The Twelfth Album" (1998)
- Octopus's Garden (2013)
- The Fifth Beatle (2013)

=== Films and series about the Beatles ===
- The Beatles (TV series)
- The Beatles Story
- Birth of the Beatles
- All Together Now (2008 film)
- Around the Beatles
- Beatles '64
- The Beatles and India
- The Beatles Anthology (TV series)
- The Beatles at Shea Stadium
- Beatles Stories
- The Beatles: The First U.S. Visit
- The Beatles: Eight Days a Week
- The Beatles: Get Back
- Birth of the Beatles
- The Compleat Beatles
- I Met the Walrus
- If These Walls Could Sing
- It Was Twenty Years Ago Today (film)
- Lennon or McCartney
- The Love We Make
- The Music of Lennon & McCartney
- Produced by George Martin
- A Salute to the Beatles: Once upon a Time

=== Beatlemania and fandom ===
- Beatlemania
- Egri Road Beatles Múzeum
- The Fest for Beatles Fans
- Presence (play)
- Seltaeb
- Fifth Beatle
- Global Beatles Day
- Beatles Day
- Helter Skelter (scenario)
- Beatle haircut
- Plastic soul
- List of songs in The Beatles: Rock Band
- Apple scruffs
- Beatle boot
- Beatlesque

=== Individuals ===
- Peter Doggett
- Walter Everett (musicologist)
- Mark Lewisohn
- Ian MacDonald
- Philip Norman (author)
- Alan W. Pollack
- Nicholas Schaffner
- Bob Spitz
- Bruce Spizer
- Astrid Kirchherr
- Kolya Vasin
- Marsha Albert
- Freda Kelly

=== Monuments and markers ===
- Beatles Square (Ulaanbaatar)
- Beatles-Platz
- Eleanor Rigby (statue)
- The Beatles Monument (Almaty)
- The Beatles Statue
- Yellow Submarine (sculpture)

=== Music and musicals about the Beatles ===
- A Letter to the Beatles
- A Walk Down Abbey Road
- Abbey Road on the River
- Across the Universe (message)
- All for the Beatles
- Beatlemania (musical)
- Beatles Forever
- Bigger Than the Beatles
- Black Beatles
- Early 1970
- Glass Onion (song)
- God (John Lennon song)
- Hello From Earth
- How Do You Sleep? (John Lennon song)
- I'm the Greatest
- John, Paul, George, Ringo ... and Bert
- Let It Be (musical)
- List of cover versions of Beatles songs
- Living in the Material World (song)
- Love (Cirque du Soleil)
- Love, Love, Love (Glee)
- Not Guilty (song)
- Rain: A Tribute to the Beatles
- Randy Scouse Git
- Run of the Mill (George Harrison song)
- Sgt. Pepper's Lonely Hearts Club Band on the Road
- Stars on 45 (song)
- Sue Me, Sue You Blues
- The Beatles: Rock Band
- The Cast of Beatlemania
- The Night That Changed America: A Grammy Salute to the Beatles
- Tina in the Sky with Diamonds
- Tributes to the Beatles
- Two of Us (2000 film)
- Wah-Wah (song)
- We Love You Beatles
- When We Was Fab

== Lists ==
- List of awards and nominations received by the Beatles
- List of cover versions of Beatles songs
- List of songs in The Beatles: Rock Band
- List of images on the cover of Sgt. Pepper's Lonely Hearts Club Band
- The Beatles' recording sessions
- List of the Beatles' live performances
- Collaborations between ex-Beatles
- The Beatles albums discography
- The Beatles singles discography
- List of people who performed on Beatles recordings
- List of the Beatles' instruments
- List of songs recorded by the Beatles
- List of songs covered by the Beatles
- The Beatles timeline

== Miscellaneous ==
- Neil Aspinall
- Tony Barrow
- Tara Browne
- Images of a Woman
- Ron Richards (producer)

== See also ==
- British Invasion
- Outline of the Doors
