= The Beatles' 1964 North American tour =

1964 concert tour by the Beatles

- Tour by the Beatles
- Poster to the concert in Vancouver, Canada
- Location: United States, Canada
- Start date: 19 August 1964
- End date: 20 September 1964
- No. of shows: 32

The Beatles concert chronology
- 1964 world tour; 1964 North American tour; 1965 European tour

The English rock group the Beatles toured the United States and Canada between 19 August and 20 September 1964. The 32 concerts comprised the second stage of a world tour that started with the band's tour of Europe, Hong Kong, Australia and New Zealand, and finished with their UK Autumn tour. The shows in the United States were a return to the country after their brief February 1964 tour.

1964 North American tour roadmap

== Background ==
Following the Beatles' two week appearance in the United States in February 1964, the band became the most well known group in America. In the six months that followed, the band achieved seventeen Top 40 singles, including six number ones. Their US-only LPs A Hard Day's Night and Something New topped the charts for nine weeks. Their first film, A Hard Day's Night, earned $1.3 million (equivalent to US$13,500,000 in 2025) in its first week. Fans in the United States excitedly anticipated a country-wide tour.

On 11 and 14 August, the Beatles began recording sessions for what would become Beatles for Sale, their fourth studio album. They recorded four songs: "Baby's in Black", "I'm a Loser", "Leave My Kitten Alone" and "Mr. Moonlight". After these recordings, they departed London on 18 August at noon. After two brief stops in Winnipeg and Los Angeles, the group arrived at San Francisco International Airport on 19 August at 6:25 pm, greeted by 9,000 fans.

== Repertoire, tour personnel and equipment ==
Supporting acts for the tour included the Bill Black Combo, the Exciters, the Righteous Brothers, Jackie DeShannon, Larry Lee and the Leesures (Las Vegas only) and Clarence "Frogman" Henry. For their concert repertoire, the Beatles chose only released songs, placing emphasis on ones where the recorded arrangement could be easily reproduced in live performance.

During shows George Harrison switched between his Gretsch Country Gentleman and Rickenbacker 12-string guitars, though he would sometimes play a different guitar than was used on the original studio recording. The Beatles used new 100-watt amplifiers for all their shows, though their sound was still consistently drowned out by the sound of screaming fans.

Journalist Larry Kane of WFUN in Miami joined the Beatles on their tour. Then 20 years old, Kane sent a letter to Beatles manager Brian Epstein requesting a one-time interview. Epstein responded by inviting him to travel with the group as part of the press party. Kane speculated that Epstein included him because he thought he was a well-known American personality that owned several radio stations.

== United States and Canada ==
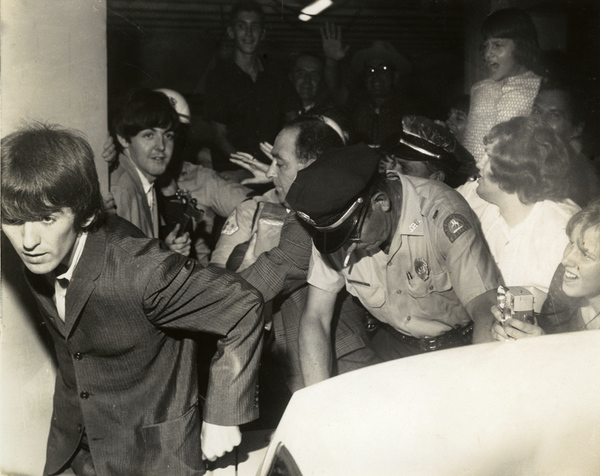
Police escort George Harrison and Paul McCartney through fans gathered at the George Washington Hotel in Jacksonville, Florida, September 1964.

The tour encompassed 32 shows in 24 cities over 31 days. Most shows quickly sold-out, and attendance ranged from 4,000 (New York City) to 28,000 (Baltimore). For each show, the Beatles earned $50,000 minimum (equivalent to US$520,000 in 2025), earning over a million dollars across the entire tour.

Intense screaming and rabid fans characterized shows across the tour. Mobbing crowds necessitated enhanced security measures, including decoy limousines and unlikely transportation for the Beatles, such as delivery vans and ambulances. Variety reported that at the show in Vancouver, 160 girls were treated for injuries and distress after thousands of fans charged at the security barriers in front of the stage. At shows in Cleveland and Kansas City fans broke past police lines to climb onto the stage. In both cases calm was only restored after Beatles press officer Derek Taylor threatened to cancel the rest of the concert.

In Montreal a newspaper reported that Ringo Starr had been threatened. Starr later speculated it was due to antisemitism and an incorrect assumption that he was Jewish. In light of the threat, the Beatles left immediately after their Montreal show for Jacksonville, Florida. Due to Hurricane Dora, their flight diverted to Key West, landing at 3:30 am on 9 September. At their hotel, Paul McCartney and John Lennon drank and talked emotionally late into the night. (Note: After Lennon's murder, McCartney commemorated their Key West night in his 1982 song "Here Today".)

=== Hollywood Bowl ===
During their first US visit, Capitol Records planned to record the Beatles' performance on 12 February 1964 at Carnegie Hall, New York City in order to make a live album for US release. The recording did not happen because the American Federation of Musicians refused to grant permission. When the Beatles returned to the US, Capitol still hoped to record and again requested permission of the Federation, this time receiving it. Martin and Capitol's Voyle Gilmore recorded the Beatles performing at the Hollywood Bowl on 23 August 1964. Executives rejected the recording for release due to its poor sound quality. Martin explained the audience's screaming was "like putting a microphone at the end of a 747 jet". The recording remained unreleased until the 1977 album The Beatles at the Hollywood Bowl where it is mixed together with two August 1965 performances.

=== New York and meeting Bob Dylan ===
While the Beatles stayed at Hotel Delmonico in New York City, New York Post writer Al Aronowitz introduced Bob Dylan to them on 28 August. The Beatles initially offered Dylan amphetamine pills but he said he preferred "cheap wine". Dylan suggested they instead smoke marijuana, something the Beatles had only tried a few times before. Starr, not knowing he was supposed to share it, smoked the entire marijuana joint himself. After rolling and smoking another joint, the Beatles laughed continuously while Dylan answered the constantly ringing telephone in the band's hotel suite saying, "This is Beatlemania here." McCartney became convinced he had discovered the meaning of life and asked Beatles roadie Mal Evans to write down his thoughts. McCartney recalls reading the paper the next morning with it saying "There are Seven Levels".

Lennon recalled the meeting in 1970: "When I met Dylan I was quite dumbfounded. I'm pretty much a fan type myself, in a way; I stopped being a 'fan' when I started doing it myself. I never went collecting people's autographs or any of that jive. But if I dig somebody, I really dig them." Dylan recalled in 1971: "I just kept it to myself that I really dug them. Everybody else thought they were for the teenyboppers, that they were gonna pass right away. But it was obvious to me that they had staying power."

=== Jacksonville and segregation concerns ===
We don't like it if there's any segregation, because we're not used to it, y'know. We've never played to segregated audiences before, and it just seems mad to me. It may seem right to some people, but to us, it just seems a bit daft.

— Paul McCartney, interviewed by Larry Kane, 20 August 1964

The Beatles experienced difficulty in leaving the George Washington Hotel in Jacksonville. Around two dozen police officers escorted the group past 500 fans. It took 15 minutes for the group to travel the 25 feet from the hotel elevator to their waiting limousine.

In July 1964, US President Lyndon Johnson signed the Civil Rights Act prohibiting discrimination "on the basis of race, color, religion, sex, or national origin". The Beatles, opposed to racial segregation, remained concerned that their upcoming Jacksonville, Florida show could still be segregated. On 6 September – a week before the show – they issued a press statement saying, "We will not appear unless Negroes are allowed to sit anywhere". The following day Jacksonville's daily paper, The Florida Times-Union, released an editorial disparaging the Beatles. Entitled "Beatlemania Is A Mark Of A Frenetic Era", the piece described the group as "a passing fad, whose appearance on the scene was perfectly timed and fitted to the mores, morals and ideals of a fast-paced, troubled time." Though the editorial did not mention segregation, Beatles writer Bill DeMain interprets it as arguing that the Beatles were not intelligent enough to comment on social issues.

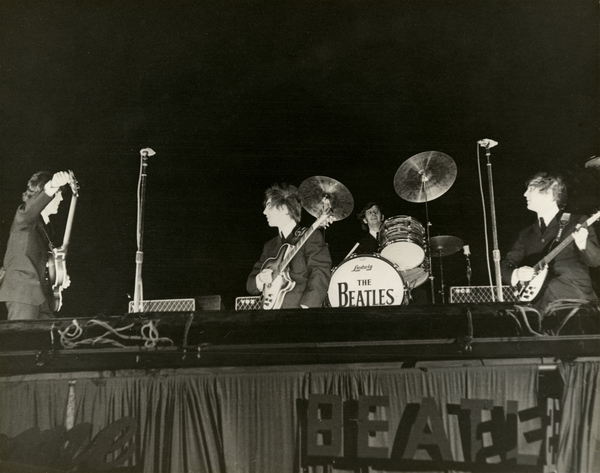
The Beatles performing at Gator Bowl Stadium in Jacksonville, Florida, 11 September 1964.

The Beatles performed at Gator Bowl Stadium on 11 September after receiving assurance from the promoter that the audience would not be segregated. Barry Miles writes that there were never plans to segregate the show. The Beatles initially refused to go on stage until newsreel and television cameramen were forced from the arena.

=== Kansas City ===
During the tour, Charlie Finley, a millionaire who owned the Kansas City Athletics baseball team, offered the Beatles a large sum to perform an extra show in Kansas City. (Note: The Beatles Anthology writes the initial offer was $60,000, while author Barry Miles writes it was $100,000 (equivalent to $600,000 and $1000,000 in 2025, respectively).) With few days off, the Beatles rejected the initial offer, accepting only after it increased to $150,000 (equivalent to $1.6 million in 2025), a higher figure than any American artist had ever received for a single show.

On 17 September, the Beatles played in Kansas City's Municipal Stadium to around 20,000 spectators, roughly half the stadium's capacity. Breaking with their trend of only playing released material, they covered "Kansas City"/"Hey, Hey, Hey, Hey" to what Beatles historian Mark Lewisohn writes was "an especially uproarious reception". The Thursday night show was a net loss for Finley, though he explained afterwards, "I don't consider it any loss at all. The Beatles were brought here for the enjoyment of the children in this area and watching them last night they had complete enjoyment."

=== Return to New York ===
The Beatles performed a charity concert in New York City on 20 September. Titled "An Evening With The Beatles", the show aided the United Cerebral Palsy of New York City and Retarded Infants Services.

== Legacy ==
I was too young to appreciate it. Who knew the Beatles and their tour of 1964 would be the benchmark for all time? After all, this was just a rock-and-roll group. You could feel the insanity, but you didn't feel the history then. After that experience, almost every other was downhill for me.

— Journalist Ivor Davis, 2003

Writer June Skinner Sawyers describes the tour as "the first major rock-and-roll concert tour in the history of popular music".

In response to Larry Kane asking if there was anything he cherished about the tour, Lennon replied: "Well, just the whole thing. It's been fantastic. We will probably never do another tour like it. It could never be the same as this one and it's probably something we will remember the rest of our days. It's just been marvelous."

The Beatles returned to North America in 1965 and 1966.

== Set list ==
According to Walter Everett (lead singers appear in parentheses):

1. "Twist and Shout" (abbreviated) (John Lennon) or "I Saw Her Standing There" (Paul McCartney)
2. "You Can't Do That" (Lennon)
3. "All My Loving" (McCartney)
4. "She Loves You" (Lennon and McCartney) (Note: Some shows omitted "She Loves You".)
5. "Things We Said Today" (abbreviated) (McCartney)
6. "Roll Over Beethoven" (George Harrison)
7. "Can't Buy Me Love" (McCartney)
8. "If I Fell" (Lennon)
9. "I Want to Hold Your Hand" (Lennon and McCartney)
10. "Boys" (Ringo Starr)
11. "A Hard Day's Night" (Lennon with McCartney)
12. "Long Tall Sally" (McCartney) or "Twist and Shout" (Lennon)

During one of the 19 August Daly City shows, the Beatles added "Till There Was You" (McCartney). On 17 September in Kansas City, they played "Kansas City"/"Hey, Hey, Hey, Hey" (McCartney).

== Tour dates ==
According to Mark Lewisohn and Walter Everett:

List of tour dates with date, city, country, venue
| Date (1964) | City | Country | Venue |
|---|---|---|---|
| 19 August | Daly City | United States | Cow Palace |
| 20 August (two shows) | Las Vegas | United States | Convention Hall |
| 21 August | Seattle | United States | Seattle Center Coliseum |
| 22 August | Vancouver | Canada | Empire Stadium |
| 23 August | Los Angeles | United States | Hollywood Bowl |
| 26 August | Morrison | United States | Red Rocks Amphitheatre |
| 27 August | Cincinnati | United States | Cincinnati Gardens |
| 28 August | New York City | United States | Forest Hills Stadium |
| 29 August | New York City | United States | Forest Hills Stadium |
| 30 August | Atlantic City | United States | Convention Hall |
| 2 September | Philadelphia | United States | Convention Hall |
| 3 September (two shows) | Indianapolis | United States | Indiana Farmers Coliseum |
| 4 September | Milwaukee | United States | Milwaukee Arena |
| 5 September | Chicago | United States | International Amphitheatre |
| 6 September (two shows) | Detroit | United States | Olympia Stadium |
| 7 September (two shows) | Toronto | Canada | Maple Leaf Gardens |
| 8 September (two shows) | Montreal | Canada | Montreal Forum |
| 11 September | Jacksonville | United States | Gator Bowl Stadium |
| 12 September | Boston | United States | Boston Garden |
| 13 September (two shows) | Baltimore | United States | Baltimore Civic Center |
| 14 September | Pittsburgh | United States | Civic Arena |
| 15 September | Cleveland | United States | Public Auditorium |
| 16 September | New Orleans | United States | City Park Stadium |
| 17 September | Kansas City | United States | Municipal Stadium |
| 18 September | Dallas | United States | Memorial Coliseum |
| 20 September | New York City | United States | Paramount Theater |

== See also ==
- List of the Beatles' live performances

== Sources ==
- The Beatles (2000). The Beatles Anthology. San Francisco: Chronicle Books. ISBN 978-0-8118-2684-6.
- Brown, Peter; Gaines, Stephen (1983). The Love You Make: An Insider's Story of the Beatles. New York: McGraw Hill.
- DeMain, Bill (2004). "Come Together". In Trynka, Paul (ed.). The Beatles: Ten Years that Shook the World. London: Dorling Kindersley. p. 144. ISBN 0-7566-0670-5.
- Everett, Walter (1999). The Beatles as Musicians: Revolver through the Anthology. Oxford and New York: Oxford University Press. ISBN 978-0-19-512941-0.
- Everett, Walter (2001). The Beatles As Musicians: The Quarry Men through Rubber Soul. Oxford and New York: Oxford University Press. ISBN 978-0-19-514105-4.
- Gould, Jonathan (2007). Can't Buy Me Love: The Beatles, Britain, and America. New York, NY: Harmony Books. ISBN 978-0-307-35337-5.
- Gunderson, Chuck (2013). Some Fun Tonight! The Backstage Story of How the Beatles Rocked America: Volume 1: 1964. Milwaukee, WI: Backbeat Books. ISBN 978-1-4950-6567-5.
- Jackson, Andrew Grant (2015). 1965: The Most Revolutionary Year in Music. New York, NY: Thomas Dunne Books. ISBN 978-1-250-05962-8.
- Kahn, Ashley (2004). "Altered States". In Trynka, Paul (ed.). The Beatles: Ten Years that Shook the World. London: Dorling Kindersley. p. 143. ISBN 0-7566-0670-5.
- Kane, Larry (2003). Ticket to Ride: Inside the Beatles' 1964 Tour that Changed the World. Running Press. ISBN 978-0762415922.
- Kane, Larry (2004). "Beatles Over America". In Trynka, Paul (ed.). The Beatles: Ten Years that Shook the World. London: Dorling Kindersley. pp. 152–155. ISBN 0-7566-0670-5.
- Lewisohn, Mark (1988). The Complete Beatles Recording Sessions. New York: Harmony. ISBN 978-0-517-57066-1.
- Lewisohn, Mark (2000) [1992]. The Complete Beatles Chronicle: The Only Definitive Guide To the Beatles' Entire Career. London: Hamlyn. ISBN 978-0-60060-033-6.
- Miles, Barry (1998). Paul McCartney: Many Years from Now. London: Secker and Warburg.
- Miles, Barry (2007) [1998]. The Beatles: A Diary – An Intimate Day by Day History. London: Omnibus. ISBN 978-1-847720-825.
- Sawyers, June Skinner (2006). "Larry Kane". In Sawyers, June Skinner (ed.). Read the Beatles: Classic and New Writings on the Beatles, Their Legacy, and Why They Still Matter. London: Penguin Books. p. 69. ISBN 0-14-303732-3.
- Spitz, Bob (2005). The Beatles: The Biography. Little Brown. ISBN 978-0-316-80352-6.
- Wiener, Allen J. (1992). The Beatles Ultimate Recording Guide. New York: Facts on File.
