= Munch Bunch =

Series of children's books

Munch Bunch book cover

The Munch Bunch is a series of children's books, created in the UK by Barrie Henderson and Elizabeth Henderson and originally published between 1979 and 1984.

The Munch Bunch are a group of unwanted vegetables, fruits, legumes and nuts who were swept to the corner of a shop but ran away together and set up home in and around an old, forgotten garden shed.

A spin-off television programme also ran for four series during the early 1980s.

In addition, a licensed range of children's yoghurts — originally a tie-in with the television series — were launched in the early 1980s. "Munch Bunch" yoghurts and fromage frais continue to be marketed today, albeit using a cow mascot and with little remaining connection to the original characters and stories.

== Books ==
=== Original series ===
The original books were written under the pen name Giles Reed by Barrie Henderson, Elizabeth Henderson, and British author Denis Bond, and illustrated by Angela Mitson. They were published between 1979 and 1984 by Studio Publications (Ipswich) Ltd. in the United Kingdom. United States publication rights were sold to Rourke Publications, Inc.

The books went out of print in the mid-to-late 1980s following a fire at Studio Publications which destroyed all the original artwork.

=== 1998 Ladybird Books series ===
A completely different series of Munch Bunch books was published in 1998 by Ladybird Books in the UK to tie in with the yoghurts, following the resurgence brought about by the TV commercials of 1994–96. Denis Bond and Angela Mitson were not involved and the characters were different, although a few such as Sally Strawberry were similarly named.

== Television series ==
There was also an early 1980s marionette/puppet-based television show, produced by long-time Gerry Anderson associates Mary Turner and John Read for ITC Entertainment, that featured the characters from the books.

The stories for the television series were different from those contained in the books and were written mainly by Bond (this time under his real name), though other writers such as Rosemary Kingsland also contributed.

The characters in the series were voiced by the veteran husband-and-wife team of Judy Bennett and Charles Collingwood, well best known for their work in The Archers. 52 ten-minute editions were produced, thus originally airing between September 1980 and May 1982. The show was also broadcast in Hong Kong on TVB Pearl and New Zealand on TV One.

- Series 1: 13 editions, first shown from 24 September 1980
- Series 2: 13 editions, first shown from 25 March 1981
- Series 3: 20 editions, first shown from 30 September 1981
- Series 4: 6 editions, first shown from 7 April 1982

== Yoghurt ==
The Munch Bunch yoghurt brand - aimed at children between three and nine - was launched by Express Dairies' Eden Vale division circa 1981 to coincide with the launch of the television series. These originally featured the Munch Bunch characters from the books as well as a few non-book characters such as Jenny Cherry and Charlie Chocolate. However, by the 1990s the yoghurt line had struck out completely in its own right retaining only the logo and a few character names.

The brand had a resurgence in the UK during the 1990s, largely as a result of a popular TV commercial for the Munch Bunch "pot shots" range (a petits-filous type yoghurt aimed at the young) set in a pool hall, which ran from May 1994 until February 1996. This popularity proved short-lived, and only three of the Munch Bunch characters were featured in the "pot shots" range.

A new range of Munch Bunch books based on the then-current characters used by the yoghurt line (including "Sally Strawberry") were released by Ladybird in 1998.

The Munch Bunch yoghurt brand was sold by Express Dairies' parent company to Nestlé in 2002 and continues to this day under their ownership. However, since 2008 marketing has been focused on a new mascot, Munch the Cow, with little remaining connection to the original "fruit and veg" characters, stories or concept.

== Characters and publications ==
=== Original character series 1979-82 ===
- Aubrey Aubergine
- Adam Avocado
- The Banana Bunch
- Barnabus Beetroot
- Billy Blackberry
- Bounce (spring onion)
- Button and Tiny (mushrooms)
- Casper Carrot
- Chunky Pineapple
- Corky Coconut
- Corny-on-the-Cob
- Dick Turnip
- Emma Apple
- Lizzie Leek
- Lucy Lemon
- Merv Marrow
- Nurse Plum
- Olive
- Olly Onion
- Peanut
- Pedro Orange
- Pete Pepper
- Penny Parsnip
- Percy Prune
- Pippa Pear
- Professor Peabody
- Rory Rhubarb
- Rozzy Raspberry
- Runner Bean
- Sally Strawberry
- Scruff Gooseberry
- Spud (Potato)
- Supercool (cucumber)
- Suzie Celery
- Tom Tomato
- Wally Walnut

==== US character name differences ====
- Aubrey Aubergine - Eddie Eggplant
- Barnabus Beetroot - Barnabus Beet
- Merv Marrow - Zack Zucchini

=== 1979 group 'Munch Bunch' book series ===
- Meet the Munch Bunch
- The Munch Bunch at the Seaside
- The Munch Bunch Have a Party
- The Munch Bunch Go Camping
- The Munch Bunch Welcomes New Friends (1982)

=== 1983 series ===
- Pete Pepper's Trip to the Zoo
- Casper Carrot's Big Mistake
- Lucy Lemon and the Birthday Post
- Aubrey Aubergine and the Grandfather Clock
- Spud's Sports Day
- Adam Avocado and the Picnic Basket
- Barnabus Beetroot's Blue Umbrella
- Penny Parsnip Starts a School
- The Banana Bunch Have Half a Holiday
- Button and Tiny Buy Bicycles
- Nurse Plum's Busy Week
- Peanut Goes to the Circus
- Emma Apple's Jumble Sale (1985)

=== 1984 series ===
- Spud and the Big Red Balloon
- Sally Strawberry and the Painted Snake
- Olly Onion's Fancy Dress Party
- Casper Carrot's New Blue Jumper
- Dick Turnip and the Crazy Clowns
- Rozzy Raspberry's Wallpaper Machine
- Billy Blackberry's Secret Tunnel
- Corny-on-the-Cob's Not so Funny Day
- Rory Rhubarb and the River Monster
- Merv Marrow's New Police Car
- Scruff Gooseberry and the Wishing Well
- Emma Apple's Late Birthday Party

=== New Zealand character series 1985 ===
- Charlie Kumara
- Kiri Kiwifruit
- Patty Passionfruit
- Ted Tamarillo

=== Yoghurt tie-in series 1998 ===
- Andy Apricot
- Barney Banana
- Bertie Blackcurrant
- Ollie Orange
- Rozzy Raspberry (different character though identically named)
- Sally Strawberry (different character though identically named)

== See also ==
- The Garden Gang - a similarly-themed (though unrelated) series launched around the same time
