= Tony Bramwell =

British press agent (1946–2024)

- Born: Anthony Harry Ferguson Bramwell; 11 March 1946; Liverpool, England
- Died: 2 June 2024 (aged 78)
- Known for: Association with the Beatles

Anthony Harry Ferguson Bramwell (11 March 1946 – 2 June 2024) was a British press agent, best known for his work with the Beatles.

== Biography ==
Bramwell grew up in Liverpool and was childhood friends with John Lennon, Paul McCartney and George Harrison. He met Harrison first, and later met McCartney when he "was about seven years old and Paul was about eight". Tony is said to have been present when Lennon and McCartney met for the first time. In 1957, he won a competition to see Buddy Holly live in Liverpool, and meet him backstage.

Bramwell's first job as a music assistant came in the late 1950s, when he met his neighbour Pauline's boyfriend, Gerry Marsden, who fronted Gerry and the Pacemakers. He would meet up with the Pacemakers and help carry in their instruments so he could get into venues for free.

When he first heard of the Beatles through an advert he did not know who they were, so was shocked when he first met them and saw Lennon, McCartney and Harrison in the band. Bramwell started working with the band in 1961, and would move to London with the band in 1963. He was hired by their manager Brian Epstein, who he worked with at NEMS Enterprises, after he asked him to promote their first single "Love Me Do".

During Tony's time working with the Beatles, he helped advertise their records by handing out copies to "anyone from secretaries, DJs, producers (even doormen). I even gave many people two copies–one for the office and one for home." Bramwell would later become joint head of Apple Records and managed the Saville Theatre for 2-3 years.

Tony produced the bands music video for "Strawberry Fields Forever" in 1967. Filmed between 30 and 31 January 1967 at Knole Park in Kent, Bramwell spent two days decorating a large tree within the park to make it resemble "a piano and harp combined, with strings" as he thought "the whole thing sounded like it was played on a strange instrument".

After the Beatles disbanded in 1970, Bramwell worked for Polydor records. He would appear regularly at Beatleweek, a yearly music event held at the Cavern Club that paid tribute to The Beatles, and appeared at tours showing locations significant to the band. McCartney said of Bramwell: "If you want to know anything about The Beatles, ask Tony Bramwell. He knows more than I do." Tony is also credited with helping discover the band Queen. In 2006, he co-authored the book Magical Mystery Tours.

Bramwell had a partner, Lydia, and two brothers. He died on 2 June 2024 after a short illness, aged 78.
