= TTR =

TTR may refer to:

== Games ==
- Ticket to Ride (board game), a 2004 rail-themed Eurogame
  - Ticket to Ride (video game), its digital adaptations
- Toontown Rewritten, a fan-made revival of the online role-playing game Toontown Online

== Linguistics ==
- Translation Terminology Writing (Traduction, terminologie, rédaction), a French-language journal
- Type-token ratio, a lexical density formula

== Transportation ==
- Pongtiku Airport, Rantetayo, Sulawesi, Indonesia (by IATA code)
- Talleyrand Terminal Railroad, Jacksonville, Florida, United States
- Tai Tong Road stop, an MTR light-rail stop in Hong Kong
- Toronto Terminals Railway, Canadian operator of the Union Station Rail Corridor

== Other uses ==
- Relative track and record, an access method in a direct-access storage device
- Test and Training Range, various U.S. military bombing and testing ranges
- Tonopah Test Range, a military installation in Nevada, United States
- Transthyretin, a plasma protein
- Trans-Tasman Resources, an Australian-owned mining company operating in New Zealand

== See also ==
- Ticket to Ride (disambiguation)
