= Can't Buy Me Love (disambiguation) =

"Can't Buy Me Love" is a song by the Beatles.

Can't Buy Me Love may also refer to:

- Can't Buy Me Love (book), a 2007 biography of the Beatles by Jonathan Gould
- Can't Buy Me Love (film), a 1987 teen comedy starring Patrick Dempsey and Amanda Peterson
- "Can't Buy Me Love" (Frasier), an episode of the television series Frasier
- "Can't Buy Me Love" (Holby City), an episode of the television series Holby City
- Can't Buy Me Love (2010 TV series) (Chinese: 公主嫁到), a 2010 TVB comedy television drama
- Can't Buy Me Love (2023 TV series), a 2023 Philippine romantic drama television series

== See also ==
- Can't Buy My Love, an album by Yui
