= Peace of Mind =

Peace of Mind may refer to:

- Inner peace, a deliberate state of psychological or spiritual calm despite the potential presence of stressors

== Music ==
=== Performers ===
- Peace of Mind (band), an American rock band
- Slipping Stitches, previously Peace of Mind, a Finnish rock band

=== Albums ===
- Peace of Mind (Breathe album), 1990
- Peace of Mind (Michael Monroe album), 1996
- Peace of Mind (Rebelution album), 2012
- Peace of Mind (Jay Whiss album), 2020
- Peace of Mind, AnikaBoh&Hollie (Anika Moa/Boh Runga/Hollie Smith) album, 2013

=== Songs ===
- Peace of Mind (1960 song), by Teresa Brewer
- Peace of Mind (Bee Gees song), 1964
- Peace of Mind (Boston song), 1976
- Peace of Mind (The Killers song), 2016
- “Peace of Mind/The Candle Burns", Falsely attributed to the Beatles, 1973
- "Peace of Mind", by Avicii from Tim, 2019
- "Peace of Mind", by Bad Company from Burnin' Sky, 1977
- "Peace of Mind", by Bat for Lashes from Two Suns, 2009
- "Peace of Mind", by Black Sabbath from 13, 2013
- "Peace of Mind", by Blue Cheer on the album New! Improved!, 1969
- "Peace of Mind", by Eddy Raven from Eyes, 1980
- "Peace of Mind", by Gotthard on the album Open, 1998
- "Peace of Mind", by The Grapes of Wrath from Treehouse, 1987
- "Peace of Mind", by Imagine Dragons from Mercury – Acts 1 & 2, 2022
- "Peace of Mind", by John Mayer on the album Heavier Things, 2003
- "Peace of Mind", by Kottonmouth Kings from Kottonmouth Kings, 2005
- "Peace of Mind", by Little Dragon, 2019
- "Peace of Mind", by Neil Young from Comes a Time, 1978
- "Peace of Mind", by Rare Bird, 1974
- "Peace of Mind", by Slowthai from Nothing Great About Britain, 2019
- "Peace of Mind", by Talib Kweli, 2004
- "Peace of Mind", by Tyler Childers from Country Squire, 2019
- "Peace of Mind", by Will Dailey, 2007
- "Peace of Mind (Song for Sarah)", by Axium from Matter of Time, 2002

== Other uses ==
- Peace of Mind (film), a 1931 German film
- "Peace of Mind" (Justified), a 2013 episode of the TV series Justified
- De Tranquillitate Animi, a dialogue by Seneca which is sometimes translated On Peace of Mind
- Peace of Mind, a 1946 book by Joshua L. Liebman
- Peace of Mind, a nonprofit organization for people with OCD, founded by Elizabeth McIngvale

== See also ==
- Piece of Mind (disambiguation)
