= Led Zeppelin: The Biography =

2021 non-fiction book

- Author: Bob Spitz
- Language: English
- Subject: Biography
- Publisher: Penguin
- Publication date: 9 November 2021
- Media type: Print (Paperback)
- Pages: 688 pp
- ISBN: 9780399562426

Led Zeppelin: The Biography is a biography of the English rock band Led Zeppelin written by Bob Spitz. It was published on 9 November 2021 by Penguin Books.
