= The Beatles in Italy =

Compilation album by the Beatles
- Released: 1965
- Recorded: 1963–1965
- Genre: Rock
- Length: 28:49
- Label: Parlophone
- Producer: George Martin

Professional ratings
Review scores
Source	Rating
Allmusic	2.5/5 stars

The Beatles in Italy is a Beatles compilation album released in Italy in 1965 (Parlophon PMCQ 31506). Despite its title, The Beatles in Italy is not a live album, but, rather, a compilation of previously released studio recordings. The album was issued in 1965 to capitalise on the band's Italian leg of their 1965 European tour (they performed in Milan, Rome and Genoa between 24 and 27 June 1965), and the release of the film, Help!. The album consists entirely of single and EP tracks that had not been previously collected into an LP (although Ticket to Ride appeared on the Help! LP one month later). All original copies of the LP were in mono.

The Beatles in Italy was reasonably popular for Parlophone, first appearing on the red label and later on the black label. EMI's Israeli affiliate was impressed enough with the compilation that they released it there, albeit without the gatefold cover that it sported in Italy. In 1969, when EMI affiliates were adopting a more standard look, the Italian company switched to a more standard Parlophone/EMI label, and the LP was reissued again along with the rest of the catalog. Still, most fans worldwide were unaware of the compilation. The record probably would have remained obscure had not John Lennon, in a 1970 Rolling Stone interview, speculated that there might have been a live album released in Italy. "There's one in Italy apparently, that somebody recorded there."

As the years passed, imported copies of the album continued to attract the interest of Beatles collectors. It was eventually issued in Japan (Odeon EAS-81525) and the Netherlands (Parlophone 1A 062-04632), when (in the mid-1980s) the album was issued in stereo. The album has not been released on CD.

== Track listing ==
All songs written by Lennon–McCartney, except where noted

Side one

1. "Long Tall Sally" (Enotris Johnson/Richard Penniman/Robert Blackwell) – 2:03
2. "She's a Woman" – 2:58
3. "Matchbox" (Carl Perkins) – 1:59
4. "From Me to You" – 1:56
5. "I Want to Hold Your Hand" – 2:24
6. "Ticket to Ride" – 3:11

Side two

7. "This Boy" – 2:11
8. "Slow Down" (Larry Williams) – 2:56
9. "I Call Your Name" – 2:09
10. "Thank You Girl" – 2:04
11. "Yes It Is" – 2:42
12. "I Feel Fine" – 2:16
