= The Garden Gang =

Children's book series by Jayne Fisher

- Peter Potato and Alice Apple (1980)
- Author: Jayne Fisher
- Cover artist: Jayne Fisher
- Language: English
- Publisher: Ladybird Books
- Published: 1979-1983

The Garden Gang is a series of books for children written by Jayne Fisher. They were published by Ladybird Books during the late 1970s and early 1980s as Series 413 and later re-issued as Series 793. Fourteen story books were written, each containing two short stories about a group of characters who were anthropomorphic fruit and vegetables living an almost human life, selling over 8 million copies. In addition to the fourteen story books, there were also three other books - an annual and two colouring books. Fisher's books were not dissimilar to the popular Munch Bunch series.

At the age of 9 years, Jayne was the youngest author to ever write for Ladybird Books. Her writing and illustrating has been an inspiration to others.

== Books ==
There are fourteen story books:

- Penelope Strawberry and Roger Radish (1979)
- Percival Pea and Polly Pomegranate (1979)
- Oliver Onion and Tim Tomato (1979)
- Wee Willie Watermelon and Betty Beetroot (1979)
- Lucy Leek and Bertie Brussels Sprout (1979)
- Gertrude Gooseberry and Belinda Blackcurrant (1979)
- Colin Cucumber and Patrick Pear (1980)
- Peter Potato and Alice Apple (1980)
- Pam Parsnip and Lawrence Lemon (1980)
- Grace Grape and Robert Raspberry (1980)
- Sheila Shallot and Benny Broadbean (1980)
- Avril Apricot and Simon Swede (1980)
- Pedro Pepper and The Cherry Twins (1983)
- Oscar Orange and Augustus Aubergine (1983)

A larger and relatively hard-to-find story book (or annual):

- Meet The Garden Gang (1981)

Two colouring books:

- The Garden Gang Have Fun (1979)
- The Garden Gang At Home (1979)

== See also ==
- Munch Bunch
