= Piece of Mind (disambiguation) =

Piece of Mind is a 1983 album by Iron Maiden.

Piece of Mind may also refer to:

- Piece of Mind (Tela album), 1996
- Piece of Mind, a 2003 album by Robin Lane
- "Piece of Mind", a song by Joey Badass from his 2015 album B4.Da.$$
- "Piece of Mind", a song by Kehlani from her 2017 album SweetSexySavage
- Piece of Mind, a 1987 composition for wind ensemble by Dana Wilson
- Piece of Mind, winner of the 2019 International Manga Award
- "Piece of Mind", a song by Idris Muhammad from his 1974 album Power of Soul
- "Piece of Mind", a song by Curved Air from their 1971 album Second Album

== See also ==
- Peace of Mind (disambiguation)
