= Greatest Hits Volume 1 (Beatles album) =

Compilation album by the Beatles
- Released: 7 June 1966
- Recorded: 1963–1965, EMI, London
- Genre: Rock and roll
- Label: Parlophone
- Producer: George Martin
- Compiler: EMI Australia

The Beatles Australian chronology
Rubber Soul (1965)	Greatest Hits Volume 1 (1966)	Revolver (1966)

Alternative cover
- In 1973 the album was repackaged with Volume 2 for the 10th anniversary of the Beatles' first release in Australia.

Greatest Hits Volume 1 is a greatest hits compilation album by the Beatles which was exclusive to Australia, Singapore and New Zealand. The album was compiled by EMI Australia to fill in the gap between Rubber Soul and Revolver (much like A Collection of Beatles Oldies would in 1966 in between Revolver and Sgt. Pepper's Lonely Hearts Club Band).

== Background and stereo mixes ==
The compilation and its follow-up were both originally conceived in early 1966, when EMI Australia requested stereo tapes from their UK branch for tracks not already in the Australian vaults. This meant the album contains the original 1965 stereo mixes of "I Want To Hold Your Hand" rather than the new stereo mixes created for the late-1966 compilation album A Collection of Beatles Oldies.

The mono editions of the album feature fold-down mono mixes, with only "She Loves You" and "I'll Get You" appearing in true mono, due to the unavailability of stereo mixes at the time of the compilation. The cover art was borrowed from the U.S. Beatles album, Beatles VI with the back cover using elements from the German album The Beatles Beat.

== Releases, sales and deletion ==
The mono version of Greatest Hits Volume 1 was released in Australia in June 1966. The stereo version followed twenty months later.

In 1973, both volumes of the album were repackaged as a double album by EMI Australia to commemorate the 10th anniversary of the Beatles first single in Australia. The release was titled The Beatles Australian 10th Anniversary 1963-1973 Souvenir Presentation - The Beatles' Greatest Hits Volumes 1 and 2. Eight different Australian radio stations promoted the album by featuring their logo on eight different stickers. The album was only available for a few months before it was quietly deleted.

By mid-1973, both volumes of the compilation had sold over 100,000 in Australia. Both volumes stayed in print in Australia until EMI Australia ceased vinyl production in 1991. The album was released on cassette but never released compact disc.

== Track listing ==
All tracks are written by Lennon–McCartney except as noted.

Side one:
No.	Title	Notes on stereo mix variations	Length
1.	"Please Please Me"	Stereo mix from Please Please Me	2:00
2.	"From Me To You"	Mono single version in fake stereo	1:56
3.	"She Loves You"	Mono single version in fake stereo	2:21
4.	"I'll Get You"	Mono single version in fake stereo	2:06
5.	"I Want To Hold Your Hand"	Original 1965 stereo mix. Also available on the German compilation albums Beatles Greatest and Beatles Beat. This mix has not yet been released on compact disc.	2:24
6.	"Love Me Do"	Mono version from Please Please Me in fake stereo	2:19
7.	"I Saw Her Standing There"	Stereo mix from Please Please Me	2:56
Total length:			16:02

Side two:
No.	Title	Notes on stereo mix variations	Length
1.	"Twist and Shout" (Phil Medley, Bert Russell)	Stereo mix from Please Please Me	2:33
2.	"Roll Over Beethoven" (Chuck Berry)	Stereo mix from With the Beatles	2:44
3.	"All My Loving"	Stereo mix from With the Beatles	2:04
4.	"Hold Me Tight"	Stereo mix from With the Beatles	2:30
5.	"Can't Buy Me Love"	Stereo mix from A Hard Day's Night	2:12
6.	"You Can't Do That"	Stereo mix from A Hard Day's Night	2:38
7.	"Long Tall Sally"	Original June 1964 stereo mix. Exclusive to this release until the Rock 'n' Roll Music album in 1976. Currently available on the Past Masters compilation album.	2:00
Total length:			16:41

== See also ==
- Outline of the Beatles
- The Beatles timeline
