= 1964: Eyes of the Storm =

2023 book by Paul McCartney

- Author: Paul McCartney
- Genre: Photo-book
- Publisher: Liveright
- Publication date: 13 June 2023
- ISBN: 978-1324093060

1964: Eyes of the Storm is a book of photographs taken by the English musician Paul McCartney, with an introduction by Jill Lepore. McCartney discovered the photographs in 2020 and approached the National Portrait Gallery in London about hosting an exhibition.

Most of the photos featured in the book were taken during the Beatles' 1964 North American tour, the height of Beatlemania. The book also includes photos taken in Liverpool, which was the Beatles' home city, and Paris.
