= Ticket to Ride =

Ticket to Ride may refer to:

== Games ==
- Ticket to Ride (board game), a rail-themed Eurogame by Alan R. Moon
  - Ticket to Ride (video game), its digital adaptations
  - Ticket to Ride: The Card Game, a simplified spin-off

== Music ==
- Ticket to Ride (album), 1969, by the Carpenters
- "Ticket to Ride" (song), 1965, by the Beatles
- "Ticket to Ride", on Stronger (Sara Evans album), 2011

== Literature ==
- Ticket to Ride (book), a 2003 Beatles-related memoir of Larry Kane
- Ticket to Ride (novel), a 1986 work by Dennis Potter
- "Ticket to Ride", a storyline in the science fiction comedy webtoon series Live with Yourself!

== Other uses ==
- Ticket to Ride (T2R), Number Nine Visual Technology's defunct line of computer graphics cards
