= Song of Love (song) =

"Song of Love" is a song recorded during an informal performance by Paul McCartney, singing and playing the piano at Twickenham Film Studios during the "Get Back Sessions" which were used to later produce both the Let It Be film and the album of the same name.

McCartney's lyrics for the song were inspired by the film Song of Love (1947), starring Katharine Hepburn as Clara Wieck, which he combined with the music from Hungarian Dance No. 4 by Johannes Brahms.

== See also ==
- The Beatles outtakes
- List of The Beatles songs
