= Jolly What! =

Compilation album by The Beatles and Frank Ifield
- Released: 26 February 1964
- Recorded: 1959–63
- Label: Vee-Jay Records
- Producers: George Martin; Norrie Paramor

The Beatles North American chronology
Meet the Beatles! (1964)	Jolly What! (1964)	The Beatles' Second Album (1964)

The Beatles & Frank Ifield on Stage
- Reissued version

Jolly What! England's Greatest Recording Stars: The Beatles & Frank Ifield on Stage is a 1964 compilation album, released by Vee-Jay Records and featuring tracks by English rock band the Beatles and by the Australian–English easy listening and country singer Frank Ifield.

Ifield toured the UK in 1963. While Vee-Jay temporarily had the US rights to a number of the Beatles' recordings, they released Jolly What! on 26 February 1964. The LP consisted of four studio Beatles songs (all previously released on Vee-Jay singles), plus eight recordings of Ifield. The original pressing has a drawing of a chubby old man with a moustache and a Beatle wig, and is itself quite rare.

However, just before Vee-Jay's publishing rights were about to expire on 10 October 1964, they changed the sleeve cover to a drawing of the Beatles. (This version, titled simply The Beatles & Frank Ifield on Stage, also listed all four Beatles' tracks on the front cover, but none of the eight contributed by Ifield.) Probably less than one hundred copies were pressed, making it one of the rarest Beatles albums. Three sealed stereo copies were discovered in 1976, selling for $600, $900 and $1,800. One of the three was re-sold in 1995 for $22,000.

Like many of the albums rushed out to cash in on the Beatles' success, Jolly What! has been called a "rip-off", due to its intentional misleading of buyers. The album consisted entirely of studio recordings (not live, and thus not "on stage"), and all the Beatles material had been previously released. The album is also known for a mistake in the liner notes: "It is with a good deal of pride and pleasure that this copulation has been presented"—presumably "copulation" should have been "compilation". (In confirming the matter, Snopes.com noted that "copulation" was appropriate, since the makers of the album were "trying to screw the fans out of their money.") The album, however, was significant in that, until the release of the Beatles' 1973 compilation album, The Beatles/1962–1966, Jolly What! was the only American Beatles album to include "From Me to You".

== Track listing ==
This track listing applies to both the original LP (Jolly What!) and the reissued version (The Beatles & Frank Ifield on Stage).

Side 1

1. "Please Please Me" – The Beatles
2. "Anytime" – Frank Ifield
3. "Lovesick Blues" – Frank Ifield
4. "I'm Smiling Now" – Frank Ifield
5. "Nobody's Darling" – Frank Ifield
6. "From Me to You" – The Beatles

Side 2

7. "I Remember You" – Frank Ifield
8. "Ask Me Why" – The Beatles
9. "Thank You Girl" – The Beatles
10. "The Wayward Wind" – Frank Ifield
11. "Unchained Melody" – Frank Ifield
12. "I Listen to My Heart" – Frank Ifield
