= Only The Beatles... =

1986 unauthorized Beatles compilation album

Cassette insert (unfolded) for Only the Beatles...

Only The Beatles... is an unauthorized Beatles compilation album released in 1986 in audiocassette format, as a joint promotional campaign by Heineken Beer and EMI; consumers could obtain a copy of the album in exchange for four pull tabs from specially marked cans and £2.99.

The promotion began on 1 July 1986. After 17 days, Apple Records' legal representation intervened and ordered EMI to stop distribution of the cassette. Production and distribution were successfully halted, and the tape has since become a collector's item.

== Contents ==
Only the Beatles... is a limited edition cassette, containing twelve Beatles songs dating from 1962–1968, made available to British drinkers of Heineken who sent four ring-pulls from cans of the beer and an additional £2.99. According to Rupert Perry, it remains "the only time a special pressing of Beatles' songs was used to promote a commercial product." The cassette marked the first appearance of EMI's 1965 stereo mix of "Yes It Is", which was soon widely bootlegged. According to Beatles musicologist Walter Everett, the identity of the specific mix used was not discovered until 2000. The same mix of the song soon reappeared on Past Masters Volume One (1988), albeit with a momentary tape defect. Additionally, Only the Beatles... contains an unreleased stereo version of "This Boy".

== Background ==
Only the Beatles... followed the label EMI's planned release of the Beatles' Sessions (1985), a proposed compilation of outtakes and unreleased material. The three surviving ex-Beatles – George Harrison, Paul McCartney and Ringo Starr – held no enthusiasm for the album, and the Beatles' company Apple Corps were granted an injunction to prevent EMI releasing it. Only the Beatles... has been interpreted as EMI's next plan to boost their income with Beatles product, as well as that of ATV Music, the music publisher who held the publishing rights for many Beatles songs, and their then-owner Michael Jackson. 10 of the 12 songs on the cassette were copyrighted to Northern Songs (owned by ATV Music), with the others – "Love Me Do" and "Twist and Shout" – copyrighted to MPL Communications and EMI Music Publishing, respectively.

The Only the Beatles... campaign was initiated by the independent company Stiletto, who since 1983 had established themselves as creating music-based campaigns for products such as 7 Up, Budweiser and Smirnoff; most notable of all their projects were the Fiat-sponsored compilation album Fiat Million Hits, which sold 125,000 copies, and a Barry Manilow compilation for Persil. According to EMI staff member Paul Watts, discussions between the label and Stiletto to initiate the Beatles-Heineken campaign occurred in December 1985, with contracts signed the following April. Heineken cans featured the names and faces of the Beatles, millions of which appeared on stores nationwide, and 250,000 copies of the cassette were created to meet the expected demand. According to Beatles biographer Keith Badman, 35 million cans advertising the tape were distributed. Stiletto, meanwhile, estimated total units of over a million tapes, giving "valuable secondary marketing income" to the record industry.

Even before Jackson's acquisition of ATV Music and Northern Songs in 1985, re-recordings Lennon-McCartney compositions by other artists had begun to appear in television commercials, including an appearance for "Help!" in a commercial for Lincoln-Mercury and "She Loves You" in a Spanish advertisement for Schweppes, while "We Can Work It Out" was licensed by Hewlett-Packard for £50,000. Commenting on these licensing deals, ATV noted that Beatles fans held "some consternation" whenever the band's music appeared in commercials. Peter Doggett writes that, aware of the millions of pounds they lost through Brian Epstein's naivety in the 1960s, the ex-Beatles "weren't afraid to market themselves as a commodity", and in May 1986 signed a merchandising partnership with Determined Productions Inc., but that their "willingness to consider marketing opportunities" did not extend to EMI's Only the Beatles... promotion, nor the use of the Beatles' version of "Revolution" in a March 1987 Nike advert.

== Reception and lawsuit ==
The cassette was first made available to Heineken consumers on 1 July 1986; Badman writes that the promotion was an initial success, but Beatles fans were "in an uproar when they [discovered] that they have to collect ring pulls from tins of beer in order to obtain a tape that contains two previously unavailable stereo recordings of 'This Boy' and 'Yes It Is'."

On 18 July 1986, 17 days after the promotion began, Apple – including the three remaining Beatles and Lennon's widow Yoko Ono – filed legal action against Whitbread Brewery (the makers of Heineken) and EMI, in hopes of curtailing the campaign. Apple contended that Whitbread did not seek Apple's permission to market Beatles music, and that Apple was unaware of the campaign, nor the negotiations that led to it, until reading about the cassette promotion in the newspaper. Ringo Starr complained that the Beatles had declined offers from Rolls Royce and Pierre Cardin, "only to end up on a beer can," in Perry's words. Starr said: "I personally don't want to be on a beer can, or any other can".

Apple appreciated that EMI were entitled to use the names of the ex-Beatles to promote musical releases but argued that the Only the Beatles... campaign was centred around promoting alcohol. EMI, conversely, believed they acted properly, whereas Whitbread called it their most successful promotion ever and contended that they would not withdraw the Beatles-branded cans, considering Apple's caution merely "a warning shot." Whitbread refused to desist after being asked by Apple's lawyers, with the latter company responding: "We do not think that this is any way for a reputable company to behave!" If the campaign was to be withdrawn, the former company stood to suffer losses of several million pounds, and their esteemed standing in the competitive lager marketing could be highly damaged. While the debate continued, Beatles fans hurriedly sent away for the cassette, which was quickly becoming a valuable collector's item. Writing in the 16 August 1986 issue of Billboard's Nick Robertshaw expected the promotion to last until stocks were fully cleared, presumably in September.

Apple ultimately won the case and the cassette was withdrawn, with the case adding to what Doggett described as "the bulging pot of Apple–EMI litigation."

== Track listing ==
Side one

1. "Love Me Do"
2. "Twist and Shout"
3. "She Loves You"
4. "This Boy"
5. "Eight Days a Week"
6. "All My Loving"

Side two

7. "Ticket to Ride"
8. "Yes It Is"
9. "Ob-La-Di, Ob-La-Da"
10. "Lucy in the Sky with Diamonds"
11. "And I Love Her"
12. "Strawberry Fields Forever"

== See also ==
- Hotel Babylon (music programme)
- Nike "Revolution" advertisement

== Bibliography ==
- "Entertainment Law & Finance". Entertainment Law & Finance. 3. Leader Publications: 4. 1988.
- Wiener, Allen J. (1994). The Beatles: The Ultimate Recording Guide. B. Adams. p. 384. ISBN 9781558504141.
- Russell, Jeff P. (2006). The Beatles Complete Discography. Milford, CT: Universe. p. 257.
- Soocher, Stan (1999). They Fought the Law: Rock Music Goes to Court. New York City: Schirmer Books. p. 101. ISBN 9780028647319.
