= You Know What to Do =

Song by the Beatles

from the album Anthology 1
- Released: 20 November 1995
- Recorded: 3 June 1964
- Studio: EMI, London
- Genre: Rock
- Length: 1:59
- Label: Apple
- Songwriter: George Harrison
- Producer: George Martin

"You Know What to Do" was the second song written and recorded by George Harrison with the Beatles. It was recorded on 3 June 1964 but remained unreleased until its inclusion on the band's 1995 outtakes compilation Anthology 1.

== Background ==
During a photographic assignment on the morning of 3 June 1964, Ringo Starr was taken ill with tonsillitis and pharyngitis, 24 hours before the Beatles were due to leave for a six-country tour. The recording session booked for that day was originally intended to produce a fourteenth song for the band's A Hard Day's Night album, but this activity was cancelled so that a replacement drummer, Jimmie Nicol, could be brought in and rehearse with the group. After running through six songs in a one-hour rehearsal in EMI's Studio Two, everyone felt satisfied with Nicol's drumming, so he left to pack his suitcase.

That evening, in a four-hour session in Studio Two, each of the three present Beatles recorded a demo of a newly written song. Harrison recorded "You Know What to Do"; John Lennon did "No Reply", which eventually ended up as the opening track of their next album, Beatles for Sale; and Paul McCartney did "It's for You", a song which was written specifically for Cilla Black to sing. The tape of the session was subsequently misfiled, but was rediscovered in 1993.

Harrison's first contribution to the Beatles' output was "Don't Bother Me", recorded in September 1963. His next contribution was not until "I Need You", recorded in February 1965. Asked about this gap in 1965, George Martin said that Harrison "got discouraged some time ago when none of us liked something that he had written". According to music critic Richie Unterberger, Martin was most likely referring to "You Know What to Do".

== Musical structure ==
The song is in the key of A major. After an introduction in D chord on the guitar the verse begins in A (I) on "When I see you I just don't know what to say" ending that line with E (V). The verse also features a D (IV) chord. Musicologist Dominic Pedler cites the song as an example of how "one of The Beatles' greatest contributions to pop songwriting was their skill in combining the familiarity of simple I-IV-V sequences with dramatically new harmonic material". The bridge features an "8-7-flat7-6" glide in consecutive semitones down the chromatic scale, a device subsequently used by the Beatles in "Michelle", "Cry Baby Cry", "Got to Get You into My Life", "And Your Bird Can Sing" and "Mother Nature's Son".

== Release ==
In anticipation of the track's release on Anthology 1, McCartney announced: "there will be a bunch of people interested in hearing the George Harrison song from thirty years ago that no one to this day has heard – it's not the greatest thing George ever wrote, but it's an undiscovered nugget. If you find a little Egyptian pot, it doesn't have to be the greatest Egyptian pot. The fact that it is Egyptian is enough."

Ultimate Classic Rock listed "You Know What to Do" as the worst of the Beatles' 227 officially released songs, stating: "When Harrison finally hit his stride, he became the Beatles' ace in the hole. But this early song ... shows why his songs were still being passed over at this point."

== Personnel ==
- George Harrison – vocal, rhythm guitar
- John Lennon – tambourine
- Paul McCartney – bass guitar
