= Can't Buy Me Love (book) =

Biography of the Beatles (2007)

- Cover of the 2008 paperback edition by Three Rivers Press
- Author: Jonathan Gould
- Genre: Biography, music, cultural history
- Publisher: Harmony Books
- Publication date: October 2007
- Pages: 661
- ISBN: 978-0-307-35337-5 (hardcover)

Can't Buy Me Love, subtitled The Beatles, Britain, and America, is a book by the American author Jonathan Gould that was published in October 2007. A biography of the English rock band the Beatles, it provides a musicological assessment of their work and a study of the cultural impact they had during the 1960s. It was first published in the United States by Harmony Books and took Gould seventeen years to complete, after he had begun working on the project with editor William Shawn for the Farrar, Straus and Giroux publishing company. It was the first book by Gould, who was formerly a professional musician.

Can't Buy Me Love was a commercial and critical success. Several reviewers have identified it as being among the best of the many books written about the Beatles.

== Background and development ==
Jonathan Gould had studied cultural anthropology at Cornell University in Ithaca, New York but had never considered a career in writing. In between his work as a studio drummer, he wrote a sample chapter, covering the period in 1962 when the Beatles signed their recording contract with EMI. At a dinner party, he discussed the idea of a full book with Jacob Brackman, the cultural critic for New Yorker magazine, who suggested he contact William Shawn, Brackman's former editor and subsequently an editor at Farrar, Straus and Giroux. For two years until his death in December 1992, Shawn served as a mentor to Gould as he wrote further chapters.

Gould continued with a new editor, Jonathan Glusman, but the loss of Shawn's guidance and distractions in his private life hindered his progress on the manuscript. Gould credits artist Lisa Corinne Davis, whom he met on a blind date organized by a friend, with providing the inspiration for him to return to the book. He carried on developing the manuscript with Glusman, who had since moved to Harmony Books, an imprint of Random House.

Can't Buy Me Love took seventeen years to complete, from Gould signing his book deal with Farrar, Straus and Giroux, to its publication by Harmony in 2007. The book ran to 661 pages, with illustrations and rare photographs of the band.

== Publication and reception ==
By 2007, some 500 books had been written about the Beatles. Following Bob Spitz's The Beatles: The Biography in 2005, Can't Buy Me Love was one of the first major Beatles biographies published after the band's Anthology multimedia project, which had culminated in the publication of an authorized book in 2000. Whereas Spitz sought to present a fresh interpretation of the Beatles' story and re-evaluate aspects of their career, Gould's work combined a biography of the band with both a musicological assessment of their work and a study of the cultural impact they had during the 1960s.

Shortly before its release, the book received highly favorable reviews from industry publications such as Booklist, Library Journal and Publishers Weekly. The first of the pre-publication trade reviews, however, from Kirkus Reviews, was so critical of Gould's work that Glusman chose to hide the piece from him. The book was then lauded in The New York Times Book Review. As a first-time author, according to screenwriter and journalist Nina Shengold, Gould had scored a "hole in one".

In the first two months after publication, Can't Buy Me Love was reprinted three times in the hardback format. The book was published in Britain on the Portrait imprint. For the trade paperback edition, released in November 2008, the cover carried a quote from The Baltimore Sun declaring it to be "The best book ever written about the Beatles". In her 2016 study of the band's historiography, Erin Torkelson Weber comments that Gould's biography proved more impressive to "knowledgeable readers" than Spitz's, which suffered from an abundance of factual errors and an opinionated approach that revealed the author's bias.

== Reviews ==
Mark Rotella of Publishers Weekly gave Can't Buy Me Love a starred "signature" review and said that "[Gould] has written an engrossing book, both fluid and economical (aside from one overlong section on the concept of charisma) ... Gould's deft hand makes the book sing. This is music writing at its best." In his review for USA Today, Anthony DeBarros wrote that while "another book about The Beatles – perhaps the single most-dissected band in the history of rock 'n' roll – seems a superfluous exercise", Gould's work "excels by providing what's been missing from many biographies: context". Jim Caligiuri of The Austin Chronicle said that despite the many books about the Beatles and the 1960s, "Few, if any, approach both subjects together in the manner that Jonathan Gould does." He described it as a "galvanizing read" and complimented the author's "insightful" assessments of some of the songs, predicting that "All [readers] will enjoy the tale of four extraordinary men and a band whose music can only be compared to itself."

Writing for The Guardian, author Jon Savage praised Gould for "retell[ing] this mythic fable in a way that makes it seem new again" through the combination of biography, musicological analysis and cultural context. He concluded: "With only minor mistakes of emphasis and quirks of taste, Gould's book is an essential addition to Beatle literature, ranking up there with [Ian] MacDonald's magisterial Revolution in the Head and Devin McKinney's brilliant Magic Circles." In Britain's Record Collector magazine, Terry Staunton described Can't Buy Me Love as "endlessly fascinating, with the potential to become indispensable" on a par with Savage's England's Dreaming, adding that Gould's music critiques were the equal of MacDonald's "landmark Revolution in the Head".

John Kehe of The Christian Science Monitor titled his review "Another Beatles book? Yes, maybe the best ever." He praised Gould's originality, saying that his description of the Beatles' "incubation" in Liverpool was superior to any of his predecessors'. Kehe also wrote: "It's professional musician Gould's uncanny ability to so vividly describe the Beatles' music – so vividly that you'd swear you could hear it playing – that elevates his book above the rest of the Beatles canon ..."
