= Octopus's Garden (book) =

2013 children's book by Ringo Starr

- Book cover
- Author: Ringo Starr
- Illustrator: Ben Cort
- Genre: Children's literature
- Publisher: Simon & Schuster UK; Aladdin Paperbacks
- Publication date: 24 October 2013 (UK); January 2014 (NA)
- Media type: Book
- Pages: 28
- ISBN: 978-1481403627
- OCLC: 850182096
- Dewey Decimal: 782.42
- LC Class: PZ8.3.S7944 Oc 2014

Octopus's Garden is a children's book written by English musician Ringo Starr, former member and drummer of the Beatles, and illustrated by Ben Cort. The book is named after and based on the Beatles' 1969 song of the same name, which Starr wrote and sung, from their album Abbey Road.

== Publication ==
The book was first published on 24 October 2013 in Great Britain by Simon & Schuster UK. It was published in January 2014 in North America. Included with the book are a CD featuring a 2005 live version of the song and an audio reading of the story by Starr.
