= Peace of Mind (unidentified song) =

Song
- Released: 1973
- Recorded: c. 1967–68
- Genre: Psychedelia; acid folk; avant-garde
- Length: 3:09

"Peace of Mind" (also known as "The Candle Burns") is the title given to a song of unknown origin by an unknown artist that some bootleg recordings have listed as being made by the Beatles in 1967. The song has the sound quality of a home-produced demo, and was supposedly recovered from a rubbish container at Apple Corps headquarters in 1970.

== History ==
The song first appeared credited as "Peace of Mind" on vinyl bootlegs of Beatles' material in 1973, including Peace of Mind and Supertracks, both issued by ContraBand Music. Over the next decade it was included on more than a dozen bootlegs, sometimes using the title "The Candle Burns".

Little to no information is known about the song, but a very popular theory was the recording was reported to have been "found in the Apple trash can in 1970."

=== Possible Beatles origin ===
In the 1975 Beatles discography All Together Now, the song was classified as a Beatles studio outtake from mid-1967 with "intriguing lyrics woven around very complicated beat changes." Later speculation suggested that it was a demo made at home, presumably by John Lennon with George Harrison and possibly Paul McCartney, using a Brenell tape recorder that each Beatle owned. The recording date has been placed as early as 1966 (reflecting the early psychedelia of some Revolver songs) or as late as 1968 (based on similarities to the guitar style on "Dear Prudence"). If the lyrics are interpreted as describing an LSD experience, the phrase "lately has been banned" places the song's origin no earlier than August 1966 when LSD became a prohibited drug in Britain.

Evidence for a Beatles connection include the song's vocals, instrumentation, lyrical content, and recording techniques. The two most prominent singers' voices "are credibly close to George's and John's," while some also perceive the voice of Paul among the three-part harmonising. In addition to the "Dear Prudence" guitar style, a sitar is heard toward the end of the song, a favourite instrument of Harrison. Lyrically, the song is reminiscent of other Lennon output from that era, such as "Tomorrow Never Knows" and "She Said She Said", although Harrison has also been mentioned as its possible songwriter. Indeed, on the bootleg "Day Tripping," the song is attributed to Harrison (with possible involvement from Donovan, Mike Love, and others) and given the name "Pink Litmus Shirt," a reference to spurious Beatles song "Pink Litmus Paper Shirt."

The song utilises recording techniques that were also used in the Beatles' studio work. The song begins with humming and an arrangement of vocable singing which are overdubbed in reverse. Just before the end of the second verse, vari-speed is used to increase the pitch and tempo. Vari-speed is used again near the end of the third verse, and a backwards portion of the lyrics is overdubbed over the instrumental coda.

Many experts on unreleased Beatles recordings are unconvinced. Both Mark Lewisohn (The Complete Beatles Chronicle) and Doug Sulpy (The 910's Guide to The Beatles' Outtakes) completely ignore the song in their books. Richie Unterberger (The Unreleased Beatles: Music & Film) allows for a slight possibility of a Beatles origin, stating: "Unless some surprising proof is unearthed, it must be assumed that 'Peace of Mind' is not the Beatles—though not beyond the shadow of a doubt." John Winn, author of several books documenting Beatles recordings, was asked his opinion about the song and was quoted as replying: "The only surprising thing about this is that so many people still believe it might have a Beatles connection, despite the fact that no evidence of such a title has turned up in the EMI tape log, the Lennon home archive, the 80 hours of 'Get Back' sessions, copyright records, any written documentation, or any interview (Paul, Ringo, and George Martin have all been asked about 'Peace Of Mind' and/or 'The Candle Burns' and it didn't ring a bell with any of them). I would bet my entire collection that it's not a Beatle recording."

The cover of 20x4 (1978) – another bootleg album containing "Peace of Mind".

=== Other possible origins ===
A number of other theories about the song's origin have been proposed. Some have judged it "merely some stoned bootleggers with a tape recorder and too much time on their hands." Others have considered it a demo by the late Syd Barrett, founding member of Pink Floyd, with the song even appearing on some bootlegs of Pink Floyd material. The song has also been suggested to be the work of The Pretty Things, who, like Pink Floyd, were recording in Abbey Road Studios in 1967 while the Beatles were there making Sgt. Pepper's Lonely Hearts Club Band.

One theory suggests that rather than being found in the Apple trash, the song was actually an outtake from the group Trash who recorded for Apple Records. Finally, since Apple was flooded with demo tapes after a 1968 ad campaign, it could be just what would be expected in the trash at Apple Records: a rejected demo from one of countless hopeful bands, whose members abandoned their musical aspirations long before the track became public.
