= She Said She Said =

1966 song by the Beatles

- Cover of the Northern Songs sheet music (licensed to Sonora Musikförlag)

Song by the Beatles

from the album Revolver
- Released: 5 August 1966
- Recorded: 21 June 1966
- Studio: EMI, London
- Genre: Psychedelic rock; acid rock; psychedelic pop
- Length: 2:39
- Label: Parlophone
- Songwriter: Credited to Lennon–McCartney
- Producer: George Martin

Licensed audio
- "She Said She Said (Remastered 2009)" on YouTube

"She Said She Said" is a song by the English rock band the Beatles from their seventh studio album Revolver (1966). It was written by John Lennon with George Harrison's help. Originally titled "He Said", its lyrics spring from actor Peter Fonda's comments during an LSD trip with the band in August 1965 along with Lennon's recollection of his childhood.

Lennon began working on the track in March 1966, and Harrison helped finish it from around three separate segments that Lennon had written. It was recorded in June 1966, the last track recorded for Revolver and the only one on the album finished in a single session. Having walked out of the session, Paul McCartney may or may not have contributed bass guitar to the recording; if not, Harrison performed it instead. As for genres, "She Said She Said" has been classified as psychedelic rock, psychedelic pop, and acid rock.

One of the earliest forms of acid rock, the song's psychedelic sound and theme had never been anticipated in Western pop music. Rolling Stone wrote that the "conjunction of melodic immediacy and acid-fueled mind games" in "She Said She Said" especially affected the burgeoning San Francisco and Los Angeles music scenes. In the view of some critics, Ringo Starr's drumming on the track is among his best. The song ranks high on Rolling Stone's (2011) and Time Out's (2018) lists of greatest Beatles songs. Conductor Leonard Bernstein much liked the song and praised its brief time signature switch from 4/4 to 3/4 and back as an instance of their creative, surprising songwriting.

== Background and inspiration ==
In late August 1965, the Beatles' manager Brian Epstein rented a house at 2850 Benedict Canyon Drive in Beverly Hills, California, for the band's six-day respite from their US tour. The large Spanish-style house was hidden within the side of a mountain. Soon, their address became widely known, and fans besieged the area; they blocked roads and tried to scale the steep canyon while others rented helicopters to spy from overhead. In response, the police department assigned a tactical squad of officers to protect the band and house. The Beatles found it impossible to leave and instead invited guests over, such as actress Eleanor Bron (their co-star in the film Help!) and folk singer Joan Baez. On 24 August, they invited Roger McGuinn and David Crosby of the Byrds, and actor Peter Fonda.

Having first taken LSD in March that year, John Lennon and George Harrison were determined that Paul McCartney and Ringo Starr should join them on their next trip. Harrison later said that the heightened perception induced by LSD had been so powerful that he and Lennon had not been able to relate to their bandmates since then: "Not just on the one level – we couldn't relate to them on any level, because acid had changed us so much." At the party, the issue of taking LSD thereby became important to maintain band unity. While Starr agreed to try the drug, McCartney refused. Fonda retells the scene in Rolling Stone: "It was a thoroughly tripped-out atmosphere because they kept finding girls hiding under tables and so forth: one snuck into the poolroom through a window while an acid-fired Ringo was shooting pool with the wrong end of the cue."

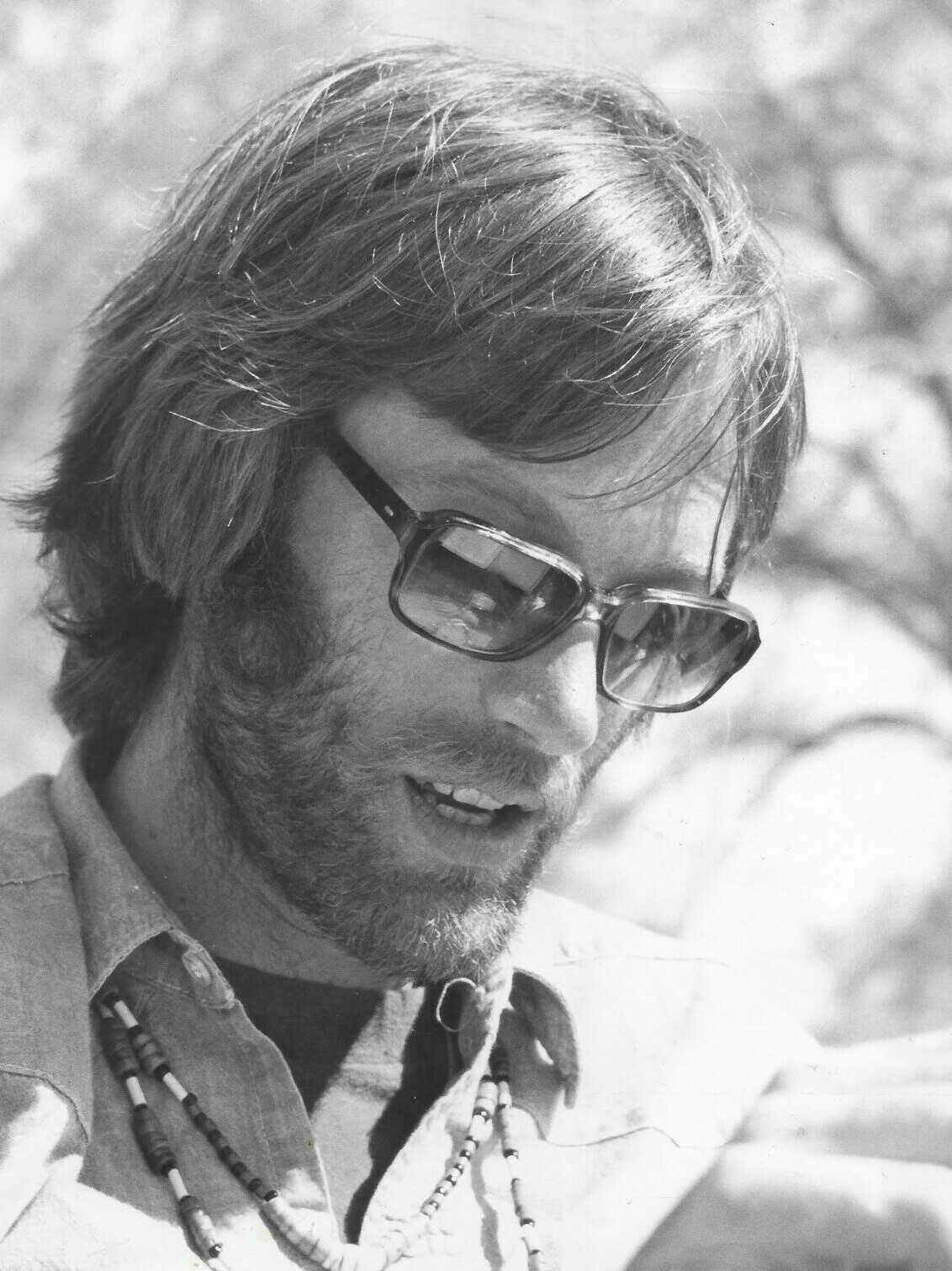
Peter Fonda in 1970

As the group passed time in a large sunken tub in the bathroom, Fonda, also on LSD, made some comments. He brought up his childhood accident where he shot himself in the abdomen and almost died. According to his memoir, he was trying to comfort a petrified Harrison, who was recovering from his own terrible LSD experience and thought he was dying: "[I] let him know that it was his own brain putting fear in his thoughts and trying to keep a control on the uncontrollable, just as impossible a task as controlling dying." Fonda said he knew what it was like to be dead since he had technically died in the operating theatre. Upon overhearing the story, Lennon urged him to stop and told him, "Who put all that shit in your head?" and, "You're making me feel like I've never been born". Lennon's account, as relayed in his interview with David Sheff, differs somewhat from Fonda's:

We were on an acid trip and the sun was shining and the girls were dancing and the whole thing was really beautiful and Sixties, and this guy – who I really didn't know; he hadn't made Easy Rider or anything – kept coming over, wearing shades, saying, 'I know what it's like to be dead,' and we kept leaving him, because he was so boring! ... It was scary. You know, ... when you're flying high and [hear], 'I know what it's like to be dead, man.' ... Don't tell me about it!

Harrison recalls in Anthology: "[Fonda] was showing us his bullet wound. He was very uncool." McCartney too remembers that he "seemed to us a little wasted; he was a little out of it".

Lennon eventually asked Fonda to leave the party. (Note: In McGuinn's recollection, Lennon's mood towards Fonda was influenced by his dislike of Cat Ballou, a film starring Fonda's sister, Jane, which they had watched earlier in the day. Fonda later wrote: "John was pissed that I was there; he didn't want any attention going around … I had no idea he was so filled with invective.") After this, the gathering settled down as Lennon, Harrison, McGuinn, and Crosby sat in the tub discussing their shared interest in Indian classical music. Crosby demonstrated raga scales on an acoustic guitar and recommended that Harrison approach the recordings of Indian sitarist Ravi Shankar. (Note: This conversation had a significant bearing on the musical direction of both groups. Harrison introduced the sitar on Lennon's song "Norwegian Wood" and combined Indian harmony and the Byrds' folk rock sound in his composition "If I Needed Someone". Crosby and McGuinn incorporated Indian influences into the Byrds' "Why" and "Eight Miles High".) Peter Brown, Epstein's assistant, later wrote that the band's LSD experiment in August 1965, besides inspiring "She Said She Said", "marked the unheralded beginning of a new era for the Beatles". Cultural author George Case describes the Beatles' subsequent albums Rubber Soul (1965) and Revolver (1966) as "the authentic beginning of the psychedelic era".

== Composition ==
"She Said She Said"
A brief sample of a verse from "She Said She Said"

"She Said She Said" was written by Lennon, and credited to Lennon–McCartney, with assistance from Harrison. Lennon began working on the track in March 1966, shortly before the Beatles started recording Revolver. On the home recordings he made at this time, the song was named "He Said" and performed on acoustic guitar. Lennon remembered that the episode with Fonda had stuck with him, and he borrowed it for a song but changed the third-person pronoun from 'he' to 'she'; he did not explain why. Harrison recalled helping Lennon construct, "weld", the song from three separate segments that his bandmate had. As he explains, "The middle part of that record is a different song. 'She said, "I know what it's like to be dead," and I said, "Oh, no, no, you're wrong ..."' Then it goes into the other one, 'When I was a boy ...'". (Note: Harrison did not name the number of song fragments with certainty.) In his 2017 book Who Wrote the Beatle Songs?, Todd Compton credits Lennon and Harrison as the song's true composers.

"She Said She Said" is in the key of B flat Mixolydian and centres on three chords: B♭7 (I), A♭ (♭VII), and E♭ (IV), with the guitars bearing a capo on the first fret to ease playing. The key centre shifts to the subdominant E flat major during the bridges by means of an F minor (v) chord; such a pivot chord had been used to modulate to the subdominant on "From Me to You" and "I Want to Hold Your Hand" as well. The coda features a canonic imitation in the voice parts, a development of the idea originally presented by Harrison's lead guitar in the verse. Lennon's Hammond organ part consists entirely of one note – a tonic B♭ held throughout and faded in and out.

The track incorporates a change in metre; the band had acquainted themselves with this musical device after Harrison introduced it in his Indian-styled "Love You To". "She Said She Said" uses both 3/4 and 4/4 time, shifting to 3/4 on the line "No, no, no, you're wrong" and back again to 4/4 on "I said …". The middle part consists of another song fragment Lennon had penned, inserted at Harrison's suggestion. Here, Lennon's lyrics move from recollecting the LSD episode with Fonda to a reminiscence of childhood: "When I was a boy everything was right / Everything was right". According to musicologist Walter Everett, this abstraction is Lennon's refuge from the disturbing sensation that he's "never been born", and the change in metre serves as an appropriate device for the shift in lyrical focus back in time. Musicologist Alan Pollack comments that, typical of the Beatles' work, the song's experimental qualities – rhythm, meter, lyrics, and sound treatment on the official recording – are tempered effectively by the band's adherence to a recognisable musical form. In this case, the structure comprises two verses, two bridge sections separated by a single verse, followed by a final verse and an outro (or coda).

"She Said She Said" is a psychedelic rock, acid rock, and psychedelic pop song. In his commentary on "She Said She Said", music critic Tim Riley writes that the song conveys the "primal urge" for innocence, which imbues the lyric with "complexity", as the speaker suffers through feelings of "inadequacy", "helplessness" and "profound fear". In Riley's opinion, the track's "intensity is palpable" and "the music is a direct connection to [Lennon's] psyche"; he adds that "at the core of Lennon's pain is a bottomless sense of abandonment", a theme that the singer would return to in late 1966 with "Strawberry Fields Forever".

== Recording ==
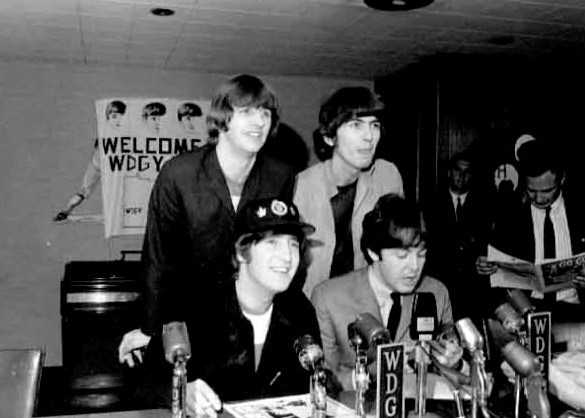
The Beatles attending a press conference in Bloomington, Minnesota, earlier in their 1965 US tour

"She Said She Said" was the final track recorded during the Revolver sessions. It was also the first composition that Lennon had brought to the band in almost two months, since "I'm Only Sleeping". Because of Lennon's lack of productivity, Harrison was afforded a rare opportunity to have a third song, "I Want to Tell You", included on a Beatles album. (Note: Lennon was quoted at this time as saying to a Melody Maker reporter that he still had one song to complete for the album but had only written "about three lines so far".) The session took place on 21 June 1966 at EMI Studios, two days before the Beatles had to leave for West Germany to begin the first leg of their 1966 world tour. It took nine hours to rehearse and record, complete with overdubs, making it the only song on Revolver to be made in a single session. After the subsequent mixing session, the Beatles' producer, George Martin, said: "All right, boys, I'm just going for a lie-down."

The creative cooperation among the four Beatles was at its highest during the Revolver period. There nevertheless remained a philosophical divide between McCartney and Lennon, Harrison and Starr due to McCartney's refusal to try LSD. (Note: McCartney said he felt tremendous "peer pressure" to join his bandmates in their LSD exploration. He admitted that his abstinence branded him as ultra-cautious and "squeaky clean", as would his reluctance to fully engage with Transcendental Meditation when Harrison and Lennon pursued that as an alternative method of attaining a state of higher consciousness.) McCartney took part in the early takes for "She Said She Said" but did not contribute to the finished recording. He recalled: "I think we had a barney or something and I said, 'Oh, fuck you!,' and they said, 'Well, we'll do it.' I think George played bass." This marked the first time any of them walked out of a Beatles recording session. In his stead, Harrison played a Burns bass guitar, which he had used earlier in the Revolver sessions during initial recording for "Paperback Writer". Harrison also contributed the lead guitar part, incorporating an Indian quality in its sound and providing an introduction that Riley describes as "outwardly harnessed, but inwardly raging". Case describes the recording as "a metallic spiral of guitar and drums as aggressive as anything by the Who or the Yardbirds".

According to McCartney biographer Barry Miles, logs from the recording session appear to contradict McCartney's statement, as they do not indicate any bass overdubs by Harrison. Some authors therefore state that McCartney taped a bass track before walking out, on the same track as Starr's drums. In his 2012 book on the making of Revolver, Robert Rodriguez comments that the stereo mix of the song puts the bass and drums on separate channels – showing that the two contributions were not recorded together on the same track, which the logs suggest – and the bass part has little in common with McCartney's playing style or sound. He concludes that the session logs must be wrong and Harrison's role as bassist on "She Said She Said" is "pretty well certain".

In his liner notes to the 2022 extended reissue of Revolver, Kevin Howlett states: "It is pretty certain ... that Paul is heard on the original rhythm track containing bass and drums." He instead suspects that the argument related to a disagreement over the song's arrangement during the overdubbing process, adding that a recording sheet for the session indicates that a piano contribution was included on the song before being wiped from the tapes entirely.

Rodriguez highlights McCartney's walkout as one of "a handful of unsolved Beatles mysteries". When identifying the probable causes for McCartney's uncharacteristic behaviour, he cites later comments made by Lennon: specifically that Lennon appreciated Harrison's tendency to "take it as-is" whereas McCartney often took a musical arrangement in a direction he himself preferred; and that, given Lennon and Harrison's habit of teasing their bandmate over his refusal to take LSD, McCartney possibly felt alienated by the song's subject matter. Lennon expressed satisfaction with the completed track, adding, "The guitars are great on it."

== Release and reception ==
EMI's Parlophone label released Revolver on 5 August 1966, one week before the Beatles began their final North American tour. "She Said She Said" was sequenced as the last track on side one, between "Yellow Submarine" and "Good Day Sunshine". Actress Salli Sachse, who appeared with Fonda in Roger Corman's 1967 psychedelic film The Trip, recalled of his reaction to the release: "Peter was really into music. He couldn't wait until The Beatles' Revolver album came out. We went to the music store and played it, trying to hear any hidden messages." Lennon reflected positively on the song in his 1980 Playboy interview, praising its guitar work. Writing in 2017, Alec Wilkinson of The New Yorker said that "She Said She Said" introduced "circumstances novel to western awareness", a theme that had "no obvious antecedent or reference" in pop music. As with much of the album, the song confused many of the band's younger or less-progressive fans. According to sociologist Candy Leonard: "For two and a half minutes they heard John recounting an impassioned conversation about something that seemed very important but totally incomprehensible. And the echoing guitar riff is a full participant in the conversation. Fans were bewildered."

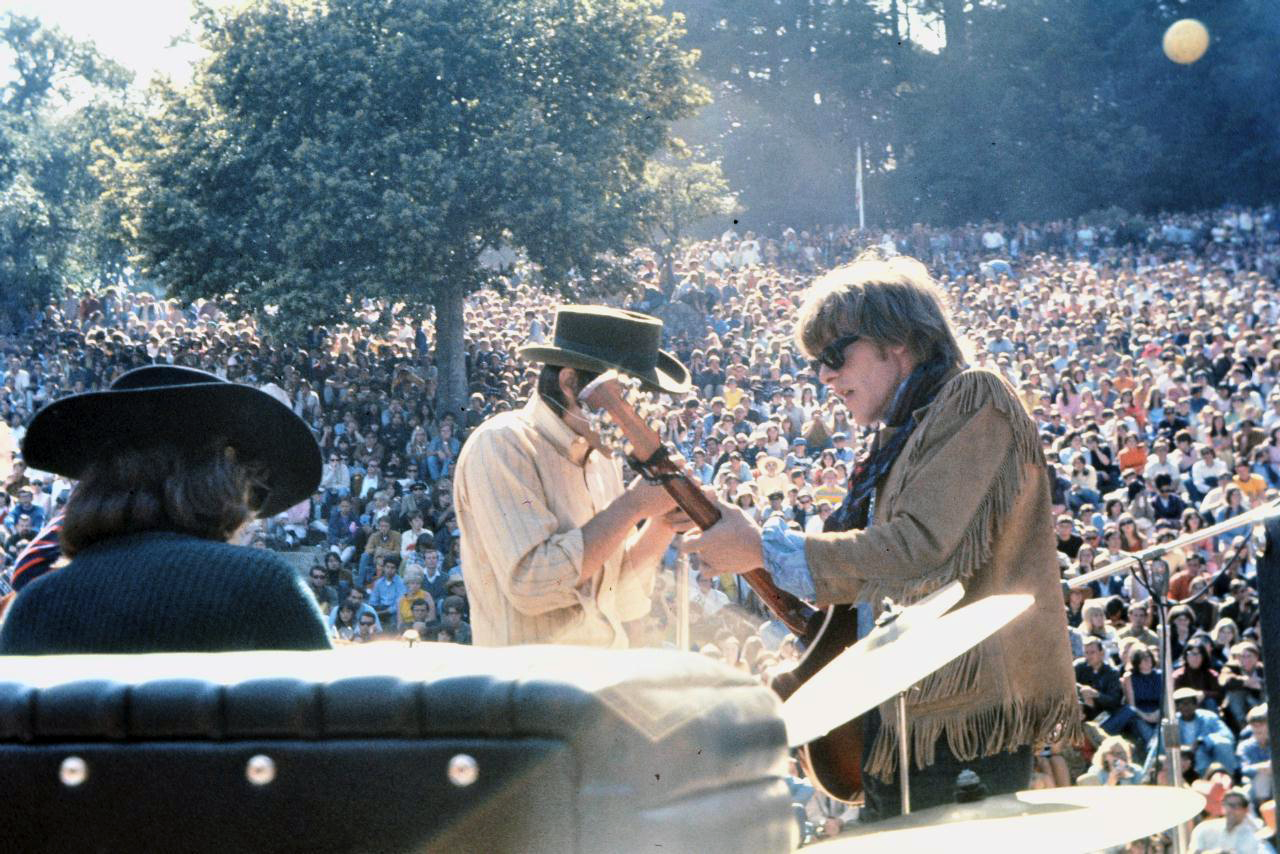
Jefferson Airplane performing at a 1967 rock festival; the song and parent album Revolver formed part of a revolution in pop music that, among others, greatly influenced the new San Francisco sound.

The song was an early example of acid rock, a genre that bloomed in Britain and America in the wake of Revolver. In his book on Swinging London, Shawn Levy identifies the album's "trio of tuned-in, blissed-out, spiked and spaced tunes" by Lennon – "Tomorrow Never Knows", "She Said She Said", and "I'm Only Sleeping" – as especially indicative of the Beatles' transformation into "the world's first household psychedelics, avatars of something wilder and more revolutionary than anything pop culture had ever delivered before". Rolling Stone ranked the song at number 37 on a list of the 100 greatest Beatles songs, attributing the development of the Los Angeles and San Francisco music scenes, including subsequent releases by the Beach Boys, Love, and the Grateful Dead, to the influence of Revolver, particularly the "conjunction of melodic immediacy and acid-fueled mind games" in "She Said She Said".

In 2018, the music staff of Time Out ranked "She Said She Said" at number 19 on their list of the best Beatles songs. The song was admired by American composer and conductor Leonard Bernstein. In his 1967 television special Inside Pop: The Rock Revolution, he demonstrated its shift in time signature as an example of the Beatles' talent for inventive and unexpected musical devices in their work. Starr's drumming on "She Said She Said" is often included among his best performances. Author and critic Ian MacDonald rated the drumming as "technically finer than that of [Starr's] other tour-de-force, 'Rain'". Thomas Ward of AllMusic noted that Lennon utters the song's first two lines "with a contempt that is rare within his work with The Beatles". He likewise calls the sound of Harrison's guitar "jarring and brittle".

"She Said She Said" was included on the band's 2012 compilation Tomorrow Never Knows, which their website described as a collection of "the Beatles' most influential rock songs". American rock band Cheap Trick covered it as part of The Howard Stern Show's tribute to Revolver in 2016. In 1988, home recordings of Lennon developing the song were broadcast on the Westwood One radio show The Lost Lennon Tapes. A cassette containing 25 minutes of these recordings, which Lennon had given to Tony Cox, the former husband of his wife Yoko Ono in January 1970, was auctioned at Christie's in London in April 2002.

== Personnel ==
According to Ian MacDonald, Walter Everett, and Robert Rodriguez:

- John Lennon – lead and backing vocals, rhythm guitar, Hammond organ
- George Harrison – backing vocal, bass guitar, lead guitar
- Ringo Starr – drums, shaker

Kevin Howlett and John C. Winn write that McCartney played bass on the rhythm track before leaving the studio. According to Howlett and Winn, the line-up is as follows:

- John Lennon – lead and harmony vocals, rhythm guitar, Hammond organ
- Paul McCartney – bass guitar
- George Harrison – harmony vocal, lead guitar
- Ringo Starr – drums

== Sources ==
- Babiuk, Andy (2002). Beatles Gear: All the Fab Four's Instruments, from Stage to Studio. San Francisco, CA: Backbeat Books. ISBN 978-0-87930-731-8.
- The Beatles (2000). The Beatles Anthology. San Francisco, CA: Chronicle Books. ISBN 0-8118-2684-8.
- Brown, Peter; Gaines, Steven (2002) [1983]. The Love You Make: An Insider's Story of the Beatles. New York, NY: New American Library. ISBN 978-0-451-20735-7.
- Case, George (2010). Out of Our Heads: Rock 'n' Roll Before the Drugs Wore Off. Milwaukee, WI: Backbeat Books. ISBN 978-0-87930-967-1.
- Compton, Todd (2017). Who Wrote the Beatle Songs? A History of Lennon-McCartney. San Jose: Pahreah Press. ISBN 978-0-9988997-0-1.
- Castleman, Harry; Podrazik, Walter J. (1976). All Together Now: The First Complete Beatles Discography 1961–1975. New York, NY: Ballantine Books. ISBN 0-345-25680-8.
- Everett, Walter (1999). The Beatles as Musicians: Revolver Through the Anthology. New York, NY: Oxford University Press. ISBN 0-19-512941-5.
- Fonda, Peter (1998). Don't Tell Dad: A Memoir. New York, NY: Hyperion. ISBN 978-0-786861118.
- Frontani, Michael R. (2007). The Beatles: Image and the Media. Jackson, MS: University Press of Mississippi. ISBN 978-1-57806-966-8.
- Goodden, Joe (2017). Riding So High: The Beatles and Drugs. London: Pepper & Pearl. ISBN 978-1-9998033-0-8.
- Gould, Jonathan (2007). Can't Buy Me Love: The Beatles, Britain and America. London: Piatkus. ISBN 978-0-7499-2988-6.
- Guesdon, Jean-Michel; Margotin, Philippe (2013). All the Songs: The Story Behind Every Beatles Release. New York, NY: Black Dog & Leventhal. ISBN 978-1-57912-952-1.]
- Lachman, Gary (2003). Turn Off Your Mind: The Mystic Sixties and the Dark Side of the Age of Aquarius. ISBN 0-9713942-3-7.
- Lavezzoli, Peter (2006). The Dawn of Indian Music in the West. New York, NY: Continuum. ISBN 0-8264-2819-3.
- Leng, Simon (2006). While My Guitar Gently Weeps: The Music of George Harrison. Milwaukee, WI: Hal Leonard. ISBN 978-1-4234-0609-9.
- Leonard, Candy (2014). Beatleness: How the Beatles and Their Fans Remade the World. New York, NY: Arcade Publishing. ISBN 978-1-62872-417-2.
- Levy, Shawn (2003). Ready, Steady, Go!: Swinging London and the Invention of Cool. London: Fourth Estate. ISBN 978-1-84115-226-4.
- Lewisohn, Mark (2005) [1988]. The Complete Beatles Recording Sessions: The Official Story of the Abbey Road Years 1962–1970. London: Bounty Books. ISBN 978-0-7537-2545-0.
- Lisanti, Tom (2001). Fantasy Femmes of Sixties Cinema. Jefferson, NC: McFarland. ISBN 978-0-7864-6101-1.
- MacDonald, Ian (2005). Revolution in the Head: The Beatles' Records and the Sixties (Second Revised ed.). London: Pimlico (Rand). ISBN 1-84413-828-3.
- Miles, Barry (1997). Paul McCartney: Many Years From Now. New York: Henry Holt & Company. ISBN 0-8050-5249-6.
- Miles, Barry (2001). The Beatles Diary Volume 1: The Beatles Years. London: Omnibus Press. ISBN 0-7119-8308-9.
- Prendergast, Mark (2003). The Ambient Century: From Mahler to Moby – The Evolution of Sound in the Electronic Age. New York, NY: Bloomsbury. ISBN 1-58234-323-3.
- Riley, Tim (2002) [1988]. Tell Me Why – The Beatles: Album by Album, Song by Song, the Sixties and After. Cambridge, MA: Da Capo Press. ISBN 978-0-306-81120-3.
- Rodriguez, Robert (2012). Revolver: How the Beatles Reimagined Rock 'n' Roll. Milwaukee, WI: Backbeat Books. ISBN 978-1-61713-009-0.
- Schaffner, Nicholas (1978). The Beatles Forever. New York, NY: McGraw-Hill. ISBN 0-07-055087-5.
- Sheff, David (2000) [1981]. All We Are Saying: The Last Major Interview with John Lennon and Yoko Ono. New York: St. Martin's Press. ISBN 0-312-25464-4.
- Sheffield, Rob (2004). "The Beatles". In Brackett, Nathan; with Hoard, Christian (eds.). The New Rolling Stone Album Guide. New York, NY: Simon & Schuster. ISBN 978-0-7432-0169-8.
- Sounes, Howard (2010). Fab: An Intimate Life of Paul McCartney. London: HarperCollins. ISBN 978-0-00-723705-0.
- Stark, Steven D. (2005). Meet the Beatles: A Cultural History of the Band That Shook Youth, Gender, and the World. New York, NY: HarperCollins. ISBN 0-06-000892-X.
- Turner, Steve (2016). Beatles '66: The Revolutionary Year. New York, NY: Ecco. ISBN 978-0-06-247558-9.
- Wenner, Jann S. (2000) [1971]. Lennon Remembers (Full interview from Lennon's 1970 interview in Rolling Stone magazine). London: Verso. ISBN 1-85984-600-9.
- Winn, John C. (2009). That Magic Feeling: The Beatles' Recorded Legacy, Volume Two, 1966–1970. New York, NY: Three Rivers Press. ISBN 978-0-307-45239-9.
- Womack, Kenneth (2007). Long and Winding Roads: The Evolving Artistry of the Beatles. New York, NY: Continuum. ISBN 978-0-8264-1746-6.
- Womack, Kenneth (2014). The Beatles Encyclopedia: Everything Fab Four. Santa Barbara, CA: ABC-CLIO. ISBN 978-0-313-39171-2.
