= Mark Rotella =

American author and editor (born 1967)

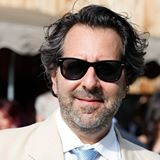
- Born: 1967 (age 58–59); Connecticut, U.S.
- Education: Columbia University
- Occupations: Author, editor
- Writing career
- Notable works: Stolen Figs: And Other Adventures in Calabria (2004), Amore: The Story of Italian American Song (2010)
- Website: markrotella.com

Mark Rotella (born 1967) is an American author and senior editor at Publishers Weekly.

== Biography ==
Rotella was born in Connecticut and grew up in St. Petersburg, Florida. He graduated from Columbia University in 1992 with a B.A. in Russian Literature.

Rotella's first book, Stolen Figs: And Other Adventures in Calabria (2004), recounts his travels to Calabria, the region in southern Italy from which his grandparents immigrated. His second book, Amore: The Story of Italian American Song (2010), tells of the era in American popular music during the mid-20th century dominated by Italian-American singers such as Frank Sinatra, Perry Como, Dean Martin, and Tony Bennett. He also wrote the introduction for the 2006 paperback edition of Carlo Levi's memoir, Christ Stopped at Eboli.

Rotella resides in Montclair, New Jersey with his wife and two children.

== Publications ==
- Stolen Figs: And Other Adventures in Calabria (North Point Press, 2004) ISBN 978-0-86547-696-7
- Introduction to Christ Stopped at Eboli by Carlo Levi (Farrar, Straus and Giroux, 2006) ISBN 978-0-374-53009-9
- Amore: The Story of Italian American Song (Farrar, Straus and Giroux, 2010) ISBN 978-0-86547-698-1
