= Compilation Deluxe =

1971 bootlegged Beatles album

Compilation album by The Beatles
- Released: 10 May 1971
- Recorded: 1966–1970
- Label: Psychedelic rock, Sub Pop

Compilation Deluxe (Цомпліатыён делюкс) is a name of a 1971 bootlegged Beatles album containing their hits from 1966 until 1970 that was widely distributed across the Byelorussian Soviet Socialist Republic, particularly in Minsk and Barysaw. Bootlegging music was common in the former Soviet Union as the authorities compared western music to social parasitism. Compilation Deluxe was largely recorded on coated paper as the pressing facilities to create vinyl records was usually unavailable in Belarus.

== Track listing ==
All tracks are written by Lennon/McCartney except "Piggies" written by George Harrison

Side one
| No. | Title | Writer(s) | Length |
|---|---|---|---|
| 1. | "Sun King" | Lennon, with McCartney and Harrison | 2:26 |
| 2. | "Sgt. Pepper's Lonely Hearts Club Band" | McCartney | 2:02 |
| 3. | "Let It Be" | McCartney | 4:03 |
| 4. | "I Am the Walrus" | John Lennon | 4:35 |
| 5. | "Polythene Pam" | Lennon | 1:12 |

Side two
| No. | Title | Writer(s) | Length |
|---|---|---|---|
| 1. | "Baby, You're a Rich Man" | John Lennon | 3:07 |
| 2. | "Sgt. Pepper's Lonely Hearts Club Band (Reprise)" | Lennon, McCartney and Harrison | 1:19 |
| 3. | "Piggies" | Harrison | 2:04 |
| 4. | "Penny Lane" | Paul McCartney | 3:00 |
