= Tomorrow Never Knows (Beatles album) =

Compilation album by the Beatles
- Released: 24 July 2012
- Recorded: 25 February 1964 – 20 August 1969
- Genres: Hard rock; psychedelic rock
- Length: 44:30
- Labels: Apple, Capitol, EMI
- Producer: George Martin

The Beatles chronology
Mono Masters (2009)	Tomorrow Never Knows (2012)	On Air – Live at the BBC Volume 2 (2013)

Professional ratings
Review scores
Source	Rating
Allmusic	3/5 stars

Tomorrow Never Knows is a compilation album by The Beatles, released digitally on 24 July 2012 through the iTunes Store. A physical edition was produced in limited quantities (1,000 copies) as a press-only PR copy.

The album was conceived to highlight the band's influence on the history of rock music and bring together many of the Beatles' most influential rock songs. It is named after the Revolver album track "Tomorrow Never Knows", which is featured on the compilation.

== Release ==
Tomorrow Never Knows was released as an iTunes Store exclusive, in partnership with EMI Records and the Beatles' own Apple Corps, upon the approval of Paul McCartney, Ringo Starr and the Board of Directors representing the estates of John Lennon and George Harrison. The release coincided with a streaming and downloadable promotional film for the song "Hey Bulldog".

The vinyl version was created to celebrate the initial $50 million in streaming revenues. Housed in a simple white paper cover, it was given mainly to press and PR outlets, as well as a few of the Apple staff involved. It was never for sale publicly as a retail album, although EMI and Abbey Road Studios took great care in making sure it was of the highest quality vinyl and packaging.

== Tributes ==
The album's release was accompanied by several written tributes from contemporary rock acts praising the band. Ex-Nirvana drummer and Foo Fighters frontman Dave Grohl wrote, "If it weren't for the Beatles I would not be a musician. It's as simple as that". Citing the gritty distorted guitar, rolling bass line, Ringo's drum fills and the groove of the song "Hey Bulldog", Grohl described it as "a quintessential Beatles rocker... raw and real".

Win Butler of Arcade Fire theorised that "There is a straight line from James Brown to death metal and it runs through 'Helter Skelter.' The primal edge to the singing on certain Beatles songs was present all along—from 'Twist and Shout' onwards. It's that edge in the voice that, to me, makes rock n' roll. I've always thought of them as heavy". Mark Stoermer of the Killers further opined that "With 'Helter Skelter', the Beatles rocked harder than Led Zeppelin ever did, one year before their first album came out".

Ben Bridwell from Band of Horses praised "She Said She Said", stating "Cheers to all involved on this track. Ringo Starr should be commended for the absolutely mental drums playing. The time signature alone is difficult to understand but to think of this performance being captured boggles my mind".

Adam Levine of Maroon 5 observed that "The Beatles are a massive part of who I am. My mother lived and breathed the Beatles and they were a huge part of my upbringing. Every time we went anywhere the Beatles were playing on the stereo. That seeped into my consciousness and completely shaped my musical style". Mike Shinoda of Linkin Park added "Nearly everything my band knows about how to approach recording a song is attached to the Beatles in some way".

== Track listing ==
All songs written by Lennon–McCartney, except tracks 5 and 10, by George Harrison.

1. "Revolution" – 3:25
2. "Paperback Writer" – 2:19
3. "And Your Bird Can Sing" – 1:59
4. "Helter Skelter" – 4:31
5. "Savoy Truffle" – 2:54
6. "I'm Down" – 2:32
7. "I've Got a Feeling" (Let It Be... Naked mix) – 3:38
8. "Back in the U.S.S.R." – 2:44
9. "You Can't Do That" – 2:35
10. "It's All Too Much" – 6:26
11. "She Said She Said" – 2:36
12. "Hey Bulldog" – 3:11
13. "Tomorrow Never Knows" – 2:59
14. "The End" (Anthology 3 mix) – 2:52

== Charts ==
Weekly chart performance for Tomorrow Never Knows
Chart (2012)	Peak position
Australian Albums (ARIA)	34
Austrian Albums (Ö3 Austria)	34
Belgian Albums (Ultratop Flanders)	23
Belgian Albums (Ultratop Wallonia)	29
Canadian Albums (Billboard)	15
Danish Albums (Hitlisten)	17
Italian Albums (FIMI)	35
New Zealand Albums (RMNZ)	37
Norwegian Albums (VG-lista)	22
UK Albums (Official Charts)	44
US Billboard 200	24
