= Bob Spitz =

American journalist

Bob Spitz is an American journalist and author best known for biographies of major cultural figures, including Reagan: An American Journey, the New York Times bestsellers The Beatles: The Biography and Dearie: The Remarkable Life of Julia Child, as well as books about Bob Dylan and the Woodstock festival.

Articles by Spitz appear regularly in The New York Times Magazine, GQ, Conde Nast Traveler, Men's Journal, In Style, Esquire and The Washington Post.

In his early career he worked as a manager for Bruce Springsteen and Elton John, beginning at Wes Farrell's Pocket Full of Tunes, a music publishing and production company. When Mike Appel signed Bruce Springsteen, Spitz followed Appel.

Spitz lives in New York.

== Nonfiction books ==
- Reagan: An American Journey (Penguin Press, 2018-10-02, ISBN 978-1-59420-531-6)
- Dearie: The Remarkable Life of Julia Child (end notes available on author's site) (Alfred A. Knopf, 2012-08-07, ISBN 9780307272225)
- The Saucier's Apprentice: One Long Strange Trip through the Great Cooking Schools of Europe (W. W. Norton and Company, 2008)
- The Beatles: The Biography (Little, Brown and Company, 2005)
- Barefoot in Babylon: The Creation of the Woodstock Music Festival, 1969 (W. W. Norton and Company, 1989)
- Dylan: A Biography (McGraw-Hill, 1988)
- The Making of Superstars: Artists and Executives of the Rock Music Business (Anchor Press, 1978)
- Led Zeppelin: The Biography (Penguin Press, 2021)
- The Rolling Stones: The Biography (Penguin Press, 2026)

== Juvenile nonfiction books ==
- Yeah! Yeah! Yeah!: The Beatles, Beatlemania, and the Music that Changed the World (Little, Brown and Company, 2007)
