= The Beatles' 1965 European tour =

1965 concert tour by the Beatles

The Beatles 1965 European tour
- Tour by the Beatles
- Poster to the concert in Barcelona
- Start date: 20 June 1965
- End date: 3 July 1965
- No. of shows: 15

The Beatles concert chronology
- 1964 North American tour; 1965 European tour; 1965 US tour

During 1965, the Beatles toured Europe.

== Set list ==
The typical set list for the shows was as follows (with lead singers noted):

1. "Twist and Shout" (short version) (John Lennon)
2. "She's a Woman" (Paul McCartney)
3. "I'm a Loser" (John Lennon)
4. "Can't Buy Me Love" (Paul McCartney)
5. "Baby's in Black" (John Lennon and Paul McCartney)
6. "I Wanna Be Your Man" (Ringo Starr)
7. "A Hard Day's Night" (John Lennon and Paul McCartney)
8. "Everybody's Trying to Be My Baby" (George Harrison)
9. "Rock and Roll Music" (John Lennon)
10. "I Feel Fine" (John Lennon)
11. "Ticket to Ride" (John Lennon)
12. "Long Tall Sally" (Paul McCartney)

== Tour dates ==
| Date | City | Country | Venue | Notes |
|---|---|---|---|---|
| 20 June 1965 (two shows) | Paris | France | Palais des Sports | |
| 22 June 1965 (two shows) | Lyon | France | Palais d'Hiver | |
| 24 June 1965 (two shows) | Milan | Italy | Velodromo Vigorelli | |
| 26 June 1965 (two shows) | Genoa | Italy | Palasport di Genova | |
| 27 June 1965 (two shows) | Rome | Italy | Teatro Adriano | |
| 28 June 1965 (two shows) | Rome | Italy | Teatro Adriano | |
| 30 June 1965 | Nice | France | Palais des Expositions | |
| 2 July 1965 | Madrid | Spain | Plaza de Toros de Las Ventas | Opening acts: Los Pekenikes, The Beat Chics, Michel, Martins duo, Trinidad Steel Band, Los Rusticks. Presented by Torrebruno. |
| 3 July 1965 | Barcelona | Spain | Plaza de Toros La Monumental | Opening acts: Los Sirex, The Beat Chics, Trinidad Steel Band, Los Shakers. Presented by Torrebruno. |

== Instruments and equipment ==
Instruments The Beatles had on the tour, shown here for each member of the group.

John

- 1964 Rickenbacker 325 hollowbody electric guitar
- 1964 Gibson J-160E acoustic/electric guitar (used for "I Feel Fine" and as a backup)
- Hohner Marine Band harmonica in key of G with harness (used for "I'm A Loser")

Paul

- 1963 Hofner Violin hollowbody bass
- 1961 Hofner Violin hollowbody bass (used as a backup)

George

- 1963 Gretsch Tennessean hollowbody electric guitar
- 1963 Rickenbacker 360-12 thinline electric guitar (used exclusively for "A Hard Day's Night")
- 1963 Gretsch Country Gentleman hollowbody electric guitar (used as a backup)

Ringo

- Ludwig 22-inch-bass 4-piece drum kit
- Number #4 drop-T logo bass drum head

== See also ==
- List of the Beatles' live performances
