= The Beatles: The Biography =

2005 book by Bob Spitz

- Author: Bob Spitz
- Language: English
- Subject: The Beatles
- Genre: Biography, music
- Publisher: Little, Brown and Company
- Publication date: November 1, 2005
- Publication place: United States
- Media type: Print (hardcover)
- Pages: 992 pp (first edition, hardcover)
- ISBN: 0-316-01331-5 (first edition, hardcover)
- OCLC: 77561694

The Beatles: The Biography is a 2005 biography of the 1960s rock band The Beatles written by Bob Spitz. It was first published by Little, Brown and Company on November 1, 2005.

== Writing and research ==
The Beatles: The Biography was among the first major Beatles biographies published after the band's Anthology multimedia project, which culminated in the publication of an authorized book in 2000. With his biography, Spitz sought to present a fresh interpretation of the Beatles' story and re-evaluate aspects of the band's career.

Spitz spent six years working on the book. He said he carried out 650 interviews during that time and received cooperation from Paul McCartney and George Harrison (who died in 2001). He also interviewed people whose story had not been heard in the context of the Beatles' history, while drawing from private tapes made by John Lennon before his death in 1980. Spitz's personal insights and editorialization feature throughout the book.

== Reception ==
The Beatles: The Biography received generally favorable reviews, particularly from The New York Times and The Washington Post. However, some journalists and fans of the band identified factual errors throughout the book. Spitz has generally been bitter towards his critics. When one of the editors of Daytrippin′, a Beatles fanzine, sent the author a list of inaccuracies in his book, Spitz replied: "You need an enema. Really! Do something useful with your life."

Spitz's book was the first major Beatles biography to be published after the emergence of internet forums, fan sites and online publications—an environment that ensured the scrutiny it received was widespread and influential. Beatles historian Erin Torkelson Weber comments that the book's standing suffered as a result of its basic factual errors, and its credibility as a historical work was further diminished by the author's tendency towards editorialization, which revealed a clear disapproval of Lennon's relationship with Yoko Ono. According to Weber, Jonathan Gould's 2007 Beatles biography, Can't Buy Me Love, proved more impressive to "knowledgeable readers".
