= Magical Mystery Tours =

2006 book about the Beatles co-authored by Tony Bramwell and Rosemary Kingsland

Magical Mystery Tours: My Life with the Beatles
- Authors: Tony Bramwell with Rosemary Kingsland
- Original title: Magical Mystery Tours: My Life with the Beatles
- Language: English
- Published: St. Martin's Griffin
- Pages: 448
- ISBN: 0312330448

Magical Mystery Tours: My Life with the Beatles is a book about the Beatles that was co-authored by Tony Bramwell (1946–2024), childhood friend of the group and Apple Corps director, and Rosemary Kingsland. It was published by St. Martin's Griffin in 2006.

== Tony Bramwell ==
Tony Bramwell was born on 11 March 1946. He died on 2 June 2024.

== Rosemary Kingsland ==
Rosemary Kingsland (5 July 1941 – 5 June 2021) was born in the Himalayan mountains of India, and worked as a journalist, and married the writer Gerald Kingsland.

- A Saint among Savages. Collins. 1980. ISBN 0-00-216740-9.
- The Secret Life of a Schoolgirl: A Memoir of a Lost Childhood, a Warring Family and a Secret Affair with Richard Burton. Crown Publishing. 2003. ISBN 1-4000-4782-X.
- White, Jimmy; Kingsland, Rosemary (1998). Behind the White Ball: My Autobiography. London: Hutchinson. ISBN 978-0-09-180126-7.

== Reception ==
Critical reception has been positive. Entertainment Weekly praised the work, writing "Though it doesn’t drop any bombshells, Tours is a tour de force of amusing details (like the suitcase of baked beans a curry-shy Starr took with him when the Beatles jetted to India in 1968 to sit at the Maharishi's feet)." The Birmingham Post also rated the book favorably, stating "This is more that just another biography about the Beatles. It's a memoir of childhood in the post-war North and a great social commentary, as it chronicles the birth of pop culture, from Liverpool in the 1950s, London in the Swinging 1960s to the New York/L.A. scenes of today."
