= Ticket to Ride (book) =

2003 memoir about the Beatles by Larry Kane

Ticket to Ride: Inside the Beatles' 1964 Tour that Changed the World
- Author: Larry Kane
- Language: English
- Genre: Biographical
- Publisher: Running Press
- Publication date: 2003
- Publication place: America
- Media type: Print (Hardcover)
- Pages: 269 (plus Appendix)
- ISBN: 0-7264-1594-4

Ticket to Ride: Inside the Beatles' 1964 Tour that Changed the World is a 2003 memoir by Larry Kane. It accounts his experience as the only American reporter to travel with The Beatles' entourage in their 1964 and 1965 tours of The United States and Canada, at the height of Beatlemania.

At the time the offer was given to him, Larry Kane was not himself a Beatles fan, so he wrote from the perspective of a journalist rather than a fan. Kane was recognized by the band to be reliable, likable and professional, and he gained the trust and confidence of each individual. As a direct result of this trust, Kane was given access to areas of The Beatles' psyches which other newsmen were not admitted to. At one point it tells the story of how The Beatles' manager, Brian Epstein, was courting Kane; oblivious to the whole situation, and as a result, Kane unknowingly led Epstein on. The book comes with a companion CD which contains interviews with The Beatles and commentary from the author looking back on the events from his current perspective.
