= The Beatles' 1965 US tour =

Two-week long concert tour by the Beatles

- Tour by the Beatles
- Poster to the first concert in New York
- Associated album: Help!
- Start date: 15 August 1965
- End date: 31 August 1965
- No. of shows: 16

The Beatles concert chronology
- 1965 European tour; 1965 US tour; 1965 UK tour

The Beatles staged their second concert tour of the United States (with one date in Canada) in the late summer of 1965. At the peak of American Beatlemania, they played a mixture of outdoor stadiums and indoor arenas, with historic concerts at Shea Stadium in New York and the Hollywood Bowl. Typical of the era, the tour was a "package" presentation, with several artists on the bill. The Beatles played for just 30 minutes at each show, following sets by support acts such as Brenda Holloway and the King Curtis Band, Cannibal & the Headhunters, and Sounds Incorporated.

After the tour's conclusion, the Beatles took a six-week break before reconvening in mid-October to record the album Rubber Soul.

Roadmap of The Beatles' 1965 US tour

== Background ==
Brian Epstein, the Beatles' manager, scheduled the band's second full concert tour of America after a series of early-summer concerts in Europe. The group began rehearsing for the tour in London on 25 July, four days before attending the royal premiere of their second feature film, Help! The rehearsals doubled as preparation for their live performance on ABC Weekend TV's Blackpool Night Out and took place at the Saville Theatre on 30 July, and then at the ABC Theatre in Blackpool.

Typically for the 1960s, the concerts were arranged in a package-tour format, with multiple acts on the bill. The support acts throughout the tour were Brenda Holloway and the King Curtis Band, Cannibal & the Headhunters, and Sounds Incorporated. The Beatles entourage comprised road managers Neil Aspinall and Mal Evans, Epstein, press officer Tony Barrow, and Alf Bicknell, who usually worked as the band's chauffeur. In his autobiography, Barrow recalls that a major part of the advance publicity for the tour was ensuring that interviews the individual Beatles gave to British publications were widely syndicated in the US. He adds that this was easily achieved, given the band's huge international popularity.

== Shea Stadium concert ==
The opening show, at Shea Stadium in the New York City borough of Queens, on 15 August was record-breaking and one of the most famous concert events of its era. It set records for attendance and revenue generation. Promoter Sid Bernstein said, "Over 55,000 people saw the Beatles at Shea Stadium. We took $304,000, the greatest gross ever in the history of show business." It remained the highest concert attendance in the United States until 1973, when Led Zeppelin played to an audience of 56,000 in Tampa, Florida. This demonstrated that outdoor concerts on a large scale could be successful and profitable. The Beatles received $160,000 for their performance, which equated to $100 for each second they were on stage. For this concert, the Young Rascals, a New York band championed by Bernstein, were added to the bill.

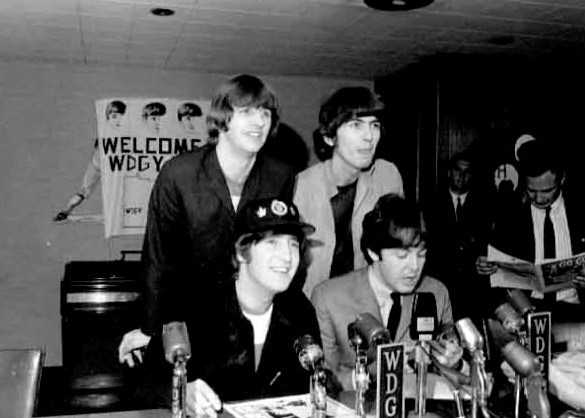
The Beatles at their press conference at Metropolitan Stadium, in Bloomington, Minnesota, August 1965

The Beatles were transported to the rooftop Port Authority Heliport at the World's Fair by a New York Airways Boeing Vertol 107-II helicopter, then took a Wells Fargo armoured truck to Shea Stadium. Two thousand security personnel were at the venue to handle crowd control. The crowd was confined to the spectator areas of the stadium, with nobody other than the band members, their entourage, and security personnel allowed on the field. As a result of this, the audience was a long distance away from the band while they played on a small stage in the middle of the field.

"Beatlemania" was at one of its highest marks at the Shea concert. Film footage taken at the concert shows many teenagers and women crying, screaming, and even fainting. The crowd noise was such that security guards can be seen covering their ears as the Beatles enter the field. Despite the heavy security presence, individual fans broke onto the field a number of times during the concert and had to be chased down and restrained. Concert film footage also shows John Lennon light-heartedly pointing out one such incident as he attempted to talk to the audience in between songs.

The deafening level of crowd noise, coupled with the distance between the band and the audience, meant that nobody in the stadium could hear much of anything. Vox had specially designed 100-watt amplifiers for this tour; however, it was still not anywhere near loud enough, so the Beatles used the house amplification system. Lennon described the noise as "wild" and also twice as deafening when the Beatles performed. On-stage "fold-back" speakers were not in common use in 1965, rendering the Beatles' playing inaudible to each other, forcing them to just play through a list of songs nervously, not knowing what kind of sound was being produced, or whether they were playing in unison. The Beatles section of the concert was extremely short by modern standards (just 30 minutes) but was the typical 1965 Beatles tour set list, with Starr opting to sing "Act Naturally" instead of "I Wanna Be Your Man". Referring to the enormity of the 1965 concert, Lennon later told Bernstein: "You know, Sid, at Shea Stadium I saw the top of the mountain." Barrow described it as "the ultimate pinnacle of Beatlemania" and "the group's brightly-shining summer solstice".

The Beatles performing in the Shea Stadium. During this first concert of the tour, "Beatlemania" was at one of its highest marks

The band were astonished at the spectacle of the event, to which Lennon responded by acting in a mock-crazed manner and reducing Harrison to hysterical laughter as they played the closing song, "I'm Down". Starr later said: "I feel that on that show John cracked up ... not mentally ill, but he just got crazy ... playing the piano with his elbows." In the view of music critic Richie Unterberger, "there are few more thrilling Beatles concert sequences than the [film's] 'I'm Down' finale".

The concert was attended by Mick Jagger and Keith Richards of the Rolling Stones and their manager, Andrew Loog Oldham. Afterwards, the Beatles spent the evening and part of the next day socialising with Bob Dylan in their suite in the Warwick Hotel.

Pete Flynn was a Shea groundskeeper who drove the Beatles from the stage to a centerfield gate in 1965, and later drove Paul McCartney from the stadium's rear entrance to the stage to perform at Billy Joel's "Last Play at Shea" concert 43 years later in 2008.

== Respite in Los Angeles ==
After the relentless schedule the Beatles had endured on their 1964 US tour, Epstein arranged for the band to have a six-day break in Los Angeles during the 1965 tour. For this purpose, Epstein rented them a secluded house at 2850 Benedict Canyon Drive, off Mulholland Drive, in Benedict Canyon, Los Angeles. The Beatles arrived there in the early hours of 23 August, following their second show at the Memorial Coliseum in Portland, Oregon.

The large Spanish-style house was hidden within the side of a mountain. The band members typically woke up at 2 pm each day and spent much of their time relaxing by the swimming pool and enjoying a panoramic view of Benedict Canyon. Soon their address became widely known and the area was besieged by fans, who blocked roads and tried to scale the steep canyon while others rented helicopters to spy from overhead. The local police department had detailed twelve officers to protect the band during their stay, and this squad was supplemented by security personnel from the company Burns Agency.

The Beatles found it impossible to leave and instead invited guests, including actor Eleanor Bron (their co-star in Help!) and folk singer Joan Baez. On 24 August, they played host to Roger McGuinn and David Crosby of the Byrds and actor Peter Fonda. On 27 August, the Beatles met their musical hero Elvis Presley at his house on Perugia Way in Bel Air.

== Hollywood Bowl shows ==
The Beatles played two concerts at Los Angeles' high-profile Hollywood Bowl. The second of these, on 30 August, featured one of the group's better performances and provided much of the material for their 1977 live album The Beatles at the Hollywood Bowl.

== Aftermath and legacy ==
Poet Allen Ginsberg attended both 22 August shows in Portland. Inspired by the Beatles and the line of police guarding them from their fans, he composed the poem "Portland Coliseum".

The Beatles and their entourage arrived at London Airport (now Heathrow Airport) on 2 September, greeted by a crowd of fans. The band's experiences in the United States inspired the songs they began writing for their new album, Rubber Soul. The album reflected, variously, the group's exposure to the latest singles from artists signed to the Motown and Stax record labels, the mutually influential relationship the Beatles had forged with the Byrds, and the influence of Dylan, who had urged Lennon to strive for more meaning in his lyrics. One of the new songs, "Drive My Car", evoked the starlets the Beatles had met at Hollywood parties, while Lennon initially based "Run for Your Life" on an early recording of Presley's, "Baby Let's Play House". Soon after their return to London, Lennon talked extensively about the meeting with Presley in an interview he gave to the NME.

A documentary titled The Beatles at Shea Stadium was produced by Ed Sullivan (under his Sullivan Productions, Inc. banner), NEMS Enterprises Ltd (which owns the 1965 copyright), and the Beatles company Subafilms Ltd. The project used twelve cameras to capture the mayhem and mass hysteria. After the Beatles had carried out overdubs in a London studio, to cover audio problems throughout the concert recording, the documentary aired on British television in March 1966. It was broadcast in the United States in 1967 on the ABC television network and subsequently became widely available as a bootleg release.

In May 2007, a recording surfaced of the entire Shea Stadium show sourced from the actual in-line stadium public address system. It offers a minute-by-minute document of the concert, including all the opening sets, and is unaltered by overdubs and other editing.

== Set list ==
The set list for the shows was as follows (with lead singers noted):

1. "Twist and Shout" (abbreviated version) (John Lennon) (Note: The Beatles omitted this song at Minneapolis, due to problems with Lennon's voice.)
2. "She's a Woman" (Paul McCartney)
3. "I Feel Fine" (Lennon)
4. "Dizzy Miss Lizzy" (Lennon)
5. "Ticket to Ride" (Lennon)
6. "Everybody's Trying to Be My Baby" (George Harrison)
7. "Can't Buy Me Love" (McCartney)
8. "Baby's in Black" (Lennon and McCartney)
9. "I Wanna Be Your Man" (Ringo Starr) ("Act Naturally" sung by Starr at Shea Stadium)
10. "A Hard Day's Night" (Lennon, with McCartney)
11. "Help!" (Lennon)
12. "I'm Down" (McCartney)

== Tour dates ==
The tour booklet cover

According to Walter Everett: (Note: Plans to give a concert in Mexico City were cancelled at the discretion of the Mexican government.)

Date	City	Country	Venue
15 August 1965	New York City	United States	Shea Stadium
17 August 1965 (2 shows)	Toronto	Canada	Maple Leaf Gardens
18 August 1965	Atlanta	United States	Atlanta Stadium
19 August 1965 (2 shows)	Houston	United States	Sam Houston Coliseum
20 August 1965 (2 shows)	Chicago	United States	Comiskey Park
21 August 1965	Bloomington	United States	Metropolitan Stadium
22 August 1965 (2 shows)	Portland	United States	Memorial Coliseum
28 August 1965	San Diego	United States	Balboa Stadium
29 August 1965	Los Angeles	United States	Hollywood Bowl
30 August 1965	Los Angeles	United States	Hollywood Bowl
31 August 1965 (2 shows)	Daly City	United States	Cow Palace

== Instruments and equipment ==
Instruments the Beatles had on the tour, shown here for each member of the group.

John Lennon

- 1964 Rickenbacker 325 semi-hollow electric guitar
- 1964 Gibson J-160E acoustic/electric guitar (used as a back-up)
- Vox Continental electric organ (Note: Two organs were used on the tour. Lennon's aggressive playing damaged the first in Toronto, so it was replaced after the Atlanta performance.)

Paul McCartney

- 1962 Hofner Violin hollow body bass
- 1961 Hofner Violin hollow body bass (used as a backup)

George Harrison

- 1963 Gretsch Tennessean hollowbody electric guitar
- 1963 Rickenbacker 360/12 thinline electric guitar
- 1963 Gretsch Country Gentleman hollowbody electric guitar (used as a backup)

Ringo Starr

- Ludwig 22-inch-bass 4-piece drum kit
- Number 5 drop-T logo bass drum head

== See also ==
- List of the Beatles' live performances

== Sources ==
- Barrow, Tony (2005). John, Paul, George, Ringo & Me: The Real Beatles Story. New York, NY: Thunder's Mouth Press. ISBN 1-56025-882-9.
- The Beatles (2000). The Beatles Anthology. San Francisco, CA: Chronicle Books. ISBN 0-8118-2684-8.
- Brown, Peter; Gaines, Steven (2002) [1983]. The Love You Make: An Insider's Story of the Beatles. New York, NY: New American Library. ISBN 978-0-451-20735-7.
- Carr, Roy; Tyler, Tony (1978). The Beatles: An Illustrated Record. London: Trewin Copplestone Publishing. ISBN 0-450-04170-0.
- Everett, Walter (2001). The Beatles as Musicians: The Quarry Men Through Rubber Soul. New York, NY: Oxford University Press. ISBN 0-19-514105-9.
- Gould, Jonathan (2007). Can't Buy Me Love: The Beatles, Britain and America. London: Piatkus. ISBN 978-0-7499-2988-6.
- Ingham, Chris (2006). The Rough Guide to the Beatles. London: Rough Guides. ISBN 978-1-84353-720-5.
- Jackson, Andrew Grant (2015). 1965: The Most Revolutionary Year in Music. New York, NY: Thomas Dunne Books. ISBN 978-1-250-05962-8.
- Kruth, John (2015). This Bird Has Flown: The Enduring Beauty of Rubber Soul Fifty Years On. Milwaukee, WI: Backbeat Books. ISBN 978-1617135736.
- Lavezzoli, Peter (2006). The Dawn of Indian Music in the West. Continuum. ISBN 978-0-8264-1815-9. Archived from the original on 22 January 2023.
- Miles, Barry (2001). The Beatles Diary Volume 1: The Beatles Years. London: Omnibus Press. ISBN 0-7119-8308-9.
- Mojo Special Limited Edition: 1000 Days That Shook the World (The Psychedelic Beatles – April 1, 1965 to December 26, 1967). London: Emap. 2002.
- Sawyers, June Skinner, ed. (2006). "Allen Ginsberg". Read the Beatles: Classic and New Writings on the Beatles, Their Legacy, and Why They Still Matter. London: Penguin Books. pp. 83–84. ISBN 0-14-303732-3.
- Schaffner, Nicholas (1978). The Beatles Forever. New York, NY: McGraw-Hill. ISBN 0-07-055087-5.
- Unterberger, Richie (2006). Unreleased Beatles Music and Film. San Francisco: Backbeat Books. ISBN 978-0-87930-892-6.
- Winn, John C. (2008). Way Beyond Compare: The Beatles' Recorded Legacy, Volume One, 1962–1965. New York, NY: Three Rivers Press. ISBN 978-0-3074-5239-9.
