= Greatest Hits Volume 2 (Beatles album) =

Compilation album by the Beatles
- Released: 16 February 1967
- Recorded: 1963–1965, EMI, London
- Genre: Rock and roll
- Language: English
- Label: Parlophone
- Producer: George Martin
- Compiler: EMI Australia

The Beatles Australian chronology
Revolver (1966)	Greatest Hits Volume 2 (1967)	Sgt. Pepper's Lonely Hearts Club Band (1967)

Greatest Hits Volume 2 is a greatest hits compilation album by The Beatles that was exclusive to Australia. The album was compiled by EMI Australia to fill in the gap between Revolver and Sgt. Pepper's Lonely Hearts Club Band.

== Background and stereo mixes ==
The compilation and its predecessor were both originally conceived in early 1966, when EMI Australia requested stereo tapes from their UK branch for tracks not already in the Australian vaults. This meant the album contains the original 1965 stereo mixes of "Day Tripper" and "We Can Work It Out" rather than the new stereo mixes created for the late-1966 compilation album A Collection of Beatles Oldies.

The compilation was the only album release worldwide of the original stereo mix of "She's a Woman" until The Beatles Box in 1980 and the Past Masters collection in 1988.

== Release, sales and deletion ==
The album was pressed and distributed through Australia by EMI Australia and through Southeast Asia (Singapore, Malaysia and Hong Kong) by EMI (SEA). By mid-1973, both volumes of the compilation had sold over 100,000 in Australia.

In 1973, both volumes of the album were repackaged as a double album by EMI Australia to commemorate the 10th anniversary of the Beatles first single in Australia. The release was titled The Beatles Australian 10th Anniversary 1963-1973 Souvenir Presentation - The Beatles' Greatest Hits Volumes 1 and 2. Eight different Australian radio stations promoted the album by featuring their logo on eight different stickers. This edition of the albums was only available for a few months before it was quietly deleted.

Both volumes stayed in print in Australia until EMI Australia ceased vinyl production in 1991. The album was released on cassette but never released a compact disc.

== Track listing ==
All tracks are written by Lennon–McCartney except as noted.

Side one:
No.	Title	Notes on stereo mix variations	Length
1.	"A Hard Day's Night"	Stereo mix from A Hard Day's Night.	2:36
2.	"Boys" (Luther Dixon, Wes Farrell)	Stereo mix from Please Please Me.	2:27
3.	"I Should Have Known Better"	Stereo mix from A Hard Day's Night.	2:45
4.	"I Feel Fine"	Original 1964 stereo mix. Available currently on the Past Masters compilation.	3:06
5.	"She's a Woman"	Original 1965 stereo mix. This was exclusive to this album until 1980. Altered stereo version released in 1965 on Beatles '65 with added reverb. Available currently on the Past Masters compilation.	3:06
6.	"Till There Was You" (Meredith Willson)	Stereo mix from With the Beatles.	2:16
7.	"Rock and Roll Music" (Chuck Berry)	Stereo mix from Beatles for Sale.	2:35
Total length:			18:51

Side two:
No.	Title	Notes on stereo mix variations	Length
1.	"Anna (Go to Him)" (Arthur Alexander)	Stereo mix from Please Please Me.	2:57
2.	"Ticket to Ride"	Original 1965 stereo mix from Help!	3:11
3.	"Eight Days a Week"	Stereo mix from Beatles for Sale.	2:44
4.	"Help!"	Original 1965 stereo mix from Help!	2:21
5.	"Yesterday"	Original 1965 stereo mix from Help!	2:07
6.	"We Can Work It Out"	Original 1965 stereo mix. Also available on the original vinyl release of Yesterday and Today and the original U.S. vinyl release of 1962–1966. Can be found on the Yesterday and Today CD within The U.S. Albums.	2:17
7.	"Day Tripper"	Original 1965 stereo mix. Also available on the original vinyl release of 1962–1966 and Yesterday and Today. Can be found on the Yesterday and Today CD within The U.S. Albums.	2:50
Total length:			18:27

== See also ==
- Outline of the Beatles
- The Beatles timeline
