= I'm a Loser =

- Cover of the song's sheet music

Song by the Beatles

from the album Beatles for Sale
- Released: 4 December 1964
- Recorded: 14 August 1964
- Studio: EMI, London
- Genre: Folk rock, country
- Length: 2:30
- Label: Parlophone
- Songwriter: Lennon–McCartney
- Producer: George Martin

Audio sample
- "I'm a Loser": file; help

"I'm a Loser" is a song by the English rock band the Beatles, originally released on Beatles for Sale in the United Kingdom, later released on Beatles '65 in the United States, both in 1964. Written by John Lennon, and credited to Lennon–McCartney, it was considered for release as a single until Lennon wrote "I Feel Fine".

According to music critic Richie Unterberger, while the lyrics tell a story of romantic rejection, "I'm a Loser" is one of the first Beatles compositions that "goes beyond young love," including "the hypocrisy of keeping up a happy face when your world's falling down".

== Composition ==
Looking back on it I think songs like 'I'm a Loser' and 'Nowhere Man' were John's cries for help. We used to listen to quite a lot of country and western songs and they are all about sadness and 'I lost my truck' so it was quite acceptable to sing 'I'm a loser' ... It's only later you think, God! I think it was brave of John.

— Paul McCartney

In 1980, Lennon said the song was "me in my Dylan period" and added, "Part of me suspects I'm a loser and part of me thinks I'm God Almighty. [Laughs]" Country music and Bob Dylan were catalysts for the song. The country is in the fingerpicking, guitar twang and downhearted words; in 1964, the Beatles were listening to songs by Buck Owens and George Jones that McCartney said were "all about sadness." Musicologists say the song was "notable for being perhaps the first Beatles' song to directly reflect the influence of Dylan, thus nudging folk and rock a little closer together toward the folk-rock explosion of the following year." Musicologist Alan Pollack said the song contained "a stronger blend of folk elements than almost anything else The Beatles had done to-date." The line "I'm not what I appear to be" was Lennon's most introspective to date, the start of the progression that led to "Help" and "Nowhere Man" the following year.

Lennon hits a low G2 in the verses, a note usually reserved for baritone and/or bass singers. This was atypical of Lennon; he sang the bulk of his Beatles songs in a tenor register. "I'm a Loser" does not mark the only occasion on which Lennon sang a low G, he also did so in "Happiness Is a Warm Gun".

The song includes what would be the last of John Lennon's harmonica solos, which had been a prominent feature of the band's early-era records and live shows. The group still occasionally used harmonica in their later recordings, such as "Rocky Raccoon".

== Recording and release ==
The Beatles recorded this song on 14 August 1964, the same day as "Mr. Moonlight" and "Leave My Kitten Alone". It was recorded in eight takes.

It was released four months after it was recorded, but beforehand, it was previewed on BBC Radio on 17 November, along with three other songs from Beatles for Sale and also the "I Feel Fine"/"She's a Woman" single.

It was also performed before its 4 December 1964 release date. The Beatles performed and recorded an appearance for a British edition of the US music TV show Shindig! at the Granville Studio in London on Saturday, 3 October 1964. The performance was watched by London residents of the Beatles Fan Club. The Beatles performed three songs live: "Kansas City/Hey-Hey-Hey-Hey!," "I'm A Loser" and "Boys." The British edition of Shindig! was first broadcast in the US by ABC on Wednesday, 7 October 1964, but was never shown in Britain.

== Personnel ==
- John Lennon – lead vocals, harmonica, acoustic rhythm guitar
- Paul McCartney – harmony vocal, bass guitar
- George Harrison – electric lead guitar
- Ringo Starr – drums, tambourine

Personnel per Ian MacDonald

== Covers ==
Marianne Faithfull covered the song in 1965 on her eponymous album. Vince Guaraldi covered the song on Live at El Matador in 1966 with Bola Sete. In 2004 the Punkles did a cover of this song on their third album Pistol. Doug Kershaw covered the song on his 1977 album Flip, Flop, and Fly. The Buckinghams covered the song on their 1997 album Places in Five. Shaun Micallef and the cast of 'Shaun Micallef's MAD AS HELL' also covered this song for the closing credits of the show broadcast on Wednesday 27 March 2013.

In 2016 James Corden sang a version of this in Beat Bugs as Morgs the Stick Bug.
