= The U.S. Albums =

Box set by the Beatles
- Released: 17 January 2014 (UK/Europe) 21 January 2014 (US)
- Recorded: 1962–1969 at EMI, Trident, Olympic, Apple, Chappell, De Lane Lea and Regent Sound studios, London; Pathé Marconi Studio, Paris; EMI Studios, Bombay
- Genres: Rock; pop
- Length: 685:36
- Labels: Apple, Capitol, UM^{e}
- Producer: George Martin (original recordings)

The Beatles chronology
The Beatles Bootleg Recordings 1963 (2013)	The U.S. Albums (2014)	The Japan Box (2014)

Professional ratings
Review scores
Source	Rating
AllMusic	4/5 stars
Classic Rock	10/10 stars
Mojo	4/5 stars
Paste	8.5/10

The U.S. Albums is a box set compilation comprising the remastered American albums released by the Beatles between 1964 and 1970. The box set was released on 21 January 2014 in the United States, marking the fiftieth anniversary of the Beatles' first trip to the US and first American album from Capitol Records, Meet the Beatles!

== Disc listing ==
All 13 unique albums released by Capitol Records are included in the box set (eight of which were previously released in The Capitol Albums, Volume 1 and Volume 2—which, unlike this U.S. Albums set, were sourced from the original Capitol master tapes). The set contains remastered mono and stereo versions of each album, except The Beatles' Story and Hey Jude, which are presented only in stereo. Additionally, the two aforementioned albums, Yesterday and Today, and the US versions of A Hard Day's Night and Revolver were released for the first time on CD in this box set. The Beatles' Story (in stereo only) is the only album from the box set that is not available separately.

- Meet the Beatles! (1964)
- The Beatles' Second Album (1964)
- A Hard Day's Night (1964)
- Something New (1964)
- The Beatles' Story (1964)
- Beatles '65 (1964)
- The Early Beatles (1965)
- Beatles VI (1965)
- Help! (1965)
- Rubber Soul (1965)
- Yesterday and Today (1966)
- Revolver (1966)
- Hey Jude (1970)

The masters for the US versions of the albums are partially based on the original 1960s masters delivered by EMI and the 2009 remasters released in The Beatles (The Original Studio Recordings) and The Beatles in Mono. Unique stereo and mono mixes prepared in the UK for US release are sourced from the original tapes. Any unique versions prepared for US release were recreated for this set. The tapes used for the 2004 and 2006 Capitol boxed sets drawn from the Capitol tapes were not used in this set, with the exception of The Beatles' Story.

The albums Sgt. Pepper's Lonely Hearts Club Band, Magical Mystery Tour, The Beatles (the "White Album"), Yellow Submarine, Abbey Road and Let It Be are not included in this set as those albums were identical to available UK editions (although the US edition of Sgt. Pepper's Lonely Hearts Club Band does not have the inner groove sound featured on the UK edition). Plus, the White Album was released only in stereo in the US. Originally, the American version of Magical Mystery Tour was also unique, as a Capitol Records compilation of the band's British EP and 1967 singles. When the Beatles catalogue was first issued on compact disc in 1987, the American Magical Mystery Tour running order was chosen as the official version of the release.

== Mixes unique to this release ==
In nearly every case, the master delivered by EMI to Capitol was used as the source; in some cases, unique mixes were re-created. In cases where Capitol had previously used a folded-down stereo mix (such as for Meet The Beatles, The Early Beatles and Help!) for the mono version, this set uses a dedicated (2009 master) mono mix. In cases where Capitol used a "Duophonic" stereo mix, this set uses a dedicated stereo mix. For tracks released on the UK Help! and Rubber Soul, the 1987 stereo remix (as remastered in 2009) was used. The one error is featured on Yesterday and Today. Instead of the unique, alternate true stereo mix of “I’m Only Sleeping”, the incorrect UK true stereo mix was used.

=== The Beatles' Second Album ===
"Long Tall Sally" (mono)
"I Call Your Name" (mono)

=== A Hard Day's Night ===
"I'll Cry Instead" (mono) (same as on mono Something New)
"And I Love Her" (mono) (same as on mono Something New, but runs slower here)
"I'll Cry Instead" (mono) (no stereo version)

=== Something New ===
"I'll Cry Instead" (mono)
"Any Time at All" (mono)
"When I Get Home" (mono)
"And I Love Her" (mono)

=== Beatles '65 ===
"I'll Be Back" (mono)
"She's a Woman" (mono)
"I Feel Fine" (mono)

=== Rubber Soul ===
"Michelle" (mono)
"The Word" (stereo)
"I'm Looking Through You" (stereo)

=== Yesterday and Today ===
"I'm Only Sleeping" (mono)
"Doctor Robert" (mono)
"And Your Bird Can Sing" (mono)
"We Can Work It Out" (stereo)
"Day Tripper" (stereo)

== Charts ==
Chart (2014)	Peak position
Belgian Albums (Ultratop Flanders)	92
Belgian Albums (Ultratop Wallonia)	168
Spanish Albums (Promusicae)	82
German Albums (Offizielle Top 100)	29
Dutch Albums (Album Top 100)	90
Swiss Albums (Schweizer Hitparade)	99
US Billboard 200	48

== See also ==
- Outline of the Beatles
- The Beatles timeline
