= I Feel Fine =

1964 single by the Beatles

Single by the Beatles
- B-side: "She's a Woman"
- Released: 23 November 1964
- Recorded: 18 October 1964
- Studio: EMI, London
- Genre: Rock and roll; pop rock
- Length: 2:25
- Label: Capitol (US); Parlophone (UK)
- Songwriter: Lennon–McCartney
- Producer: George Martin

The Beatles US singles chronology
"Matchbox" (1964)	"I Feel Fine" (1964)	"Eight Days a Week" (1965)

The Beatles UK singles chronology
"A Hard Day's Night" (1964)	"I Feel Fine" (1964)	"Ticket to Ride" (1965)

Promotional film
- "I Feel Fine" on YouTube

"I Feel Fine" is a song by the English rock band the Beatles that was released in November 1964 as the A-side of their eighth single. It was written by John Lennon and credited to the Lennon–McCartney partnership. The recording includes one of the earliest uses of guitar feedback in popular music.

The single topped charts in the United Kingdom, the United States, Canada, Ireland, the Netherlands, New Zealand, Norway and Sweden. In the UK, it was the fifth-highest-selling single of the 1960s, and the Christmas number one of 1964.

== Origin ==
Lennon wrote the song's guitar riff while the Beatles were in the studio recording "Eight Days a Week" in October 1964, and kept playing it between takes. He later recalled: "I told them I'd write a song specially for the riff. So they said, 'Yes. You go away and do that', knowing that we'd almost finished the album Beatles for Sale. Anyway, going into the studio one morning, I said to Ringo, 'I've written this song but it's lousy'. But we tried it, complete with riff, and it sounded like an A-side, so we decided to release it just like that."

Both Lennon and George Harrison said that the riff was influenced by a riff in "Watch Your Step", a 1961 song written and performed by Bobby Parker and covered by the Beatles in concerts during 1961 and 1962. Paul McCartney said the drums on "I Feel Fine" were inspired by Ray Charles's 1959 single "What'd I Say".

At the time of the song's recording, the Beatles, having mastered the studio basics, had begun to explore new sources of inspiration in noises previously eliminated as mistakes (such as electronic goofs, twisted tapes, and talkback). "I Feel Fine" marks one of the earliest examples of the use of feedback as a recording effect in popular music. Artists such as the Kinks and the Who had already used feedback live, but Lennon remained proud of the fact that the Beatles were perhaps the first group to deliberately put it on vinyl.

== Structure ==
"I Feel Fine" is written in 4/4 time with drummer Ringo Starr's R&B-influenced beat (based on the "Latin" drumming in Ray Charles's hit "What'd I Say") featured through most of the song except for the bridge, which has a more conventional backbeat. After a brief note of heavy feedback (see below), the intro begins with a distinctive arpeggiated riff which starts in D major before quickly progressing to C major and then G major, at which point the vocals begin in G. The melody, unusually, uses a major third and a minor seventh, and has been classified as Mixolydian mode. Just before the coda, Lennon's intro riff (or ostinato) is repeated with a bright sound by George Harrison on electric guitar (a Gretsch Tennessean). The song ends with a fadeout of the G major portion of the opening riff repeated several times.

=== Audio feedback ===
"I Feel Fine" starts with a single, percussive feedback note produced by McCartney plucking the A string on his bass, and Lennon's guitar, which was leaning against McCartney's bass amp, picking up feedback. This is considered the first intentional use of feedback on a rock record. According to McCartney, "John had a semi-acoustic Gibson guitar. It had a pickup on it so it could be amplified ... We were just about to walk away to listen to a take when John leaned his guitar against the amp. I can still see him doing it … it went, 'Nnnnnnwahhhhh!' And we went, 'What's that? Voodoo!' 'No, it's feedback.' 'Wow, it's a great sound!' George Martin was there so we said, 'Can we have that on the record?' 'Well, I suppose we could, we could edit it on the front.' It was a found object, an accident caused by leaning the guitar against the amp." Although it sounded very much like an electric guitar, Lennon actually played the riff on an acoustic-electric guitar (a Gibson model J-160E), employing the guitar's onboard pickup.

Later, Lennon was very proud of this sonic experimentation. In one of his last interviews, he said: "I defy anybody to find a record – unless it's some old blues record in 1922 – that uses feedback that way."

== Release and commercial performance ==
Backed by "She's a Woman", "I Feel Fine" was issued as a single A-side on 23 November 1964 in the United States, with the UK release following on 27 November. Public demand for the single was unprecedented, according to author Nicholas Schaffner, particularly in the US, where the market had been saturated with Beatles releases over the first seven months of 1964, "making the ensuing gap seem like forever". He recalled that fans remained "glued" to their transistor radios over the ten days between the single's unveiling on radio and its retail release, and that this established a fan ritual for all the band's subsequent records.

"I Feel Fine" reached the top of the UK charts on 12 December, displacing the Rolling Stones' "Little Red Rooster", and remained there for five weeks, becoming the Christmas number one of 1964. In Canada, the song also reached number one.

The song topped the US Billboard Hot 100 chart for three weeks in late 1964 and early 1965. Cash Box magazine ranked "I Feel Fine" as the 19th biggest US hit of 1965. It was the sixth single by the Beatles to hit number one on the Billboard Hot 100 in a calendar year (1964), an all-time record. In order, these singles were "I Want to Hold Your Hand", "She Loves You", "Can't Buy Me Love", "Love Me Do", "A Hard Day's Night" and "I Feel Fine". For songwriters Lennon and McCartney, it was the seventh number-one they wrote in the same calendar year, which was another all-time record. The song was the first of six Hot 100 number one chart-toppers in a row (not counting the EP 4 – by the Beatles) by one act, also a record at the time. The subsequent singles were "Eight Days a Week", "Ticket to Ride", "Help!", "Yesterday" and "We Can Work It Out".

By 2012, "I Feel Fine" had sold 1.41 million copies in the UK. As of December 2018, it was the 53rd-best-selling single of all time there – one of six Beatles songs included on the top sales rankings published by the UK's Official Charts Company.

== Promotional film ==
Picture taken during the filming of the promotional film

On 23 November 1965, the Beatles filmed two promotional clips for the song for inclusion in Top of the Pops' round-up of the year's biggest hits. Directed by Joe McGrath, both films feature the band interacting with items of gym equipment. In the first, Harrison sang into a punch-ball while Starr pedalled on an exercise bike. In the second film, the Beatles ate fish and chips while trying to mime to the song. The band's manager, Brian Epstein, was adamant that this film could not be used. From then on, the controversial "fish and chips" footage was kept in a 2" videotape box labelled "I Feel Fried". The first promotional film was included in the Beatles' 2015 video compilation 1, and both films were included in the three-disc versions of the compilation, titled 1+.

== Other releases ==
In the United States, "I Feel Fine" was released on the Capitol album Beatles '65. The mono version of the LP featured an exclusive mix of "I Feel Fine" with added reverb and a shorter fade as created by Beatles producer George Martin, which was also released as a single on Capitol. The stereo version presented a duophonic (mock stereo) mix of the song featuring a layer of reverb added by executive Dave Dexter Jr. Both versions were released on CD in 2004 as part of The Capitol Albums, Volume 1 box set.

In the United Kingdom, the song was released in the LP format on A Collection of Beatles Oldies in 1966, and the stereo version of that album included a true stereo mix, which can also be found on the Past Masters Volume 1 and 1 CDs. There is also another stereo version (virtually identical to the standard true stereo mix) in which the whispered words "'s low enough" can be heard at the beginning of the track. This "whispering version" appeared on the UK release of 1962–1966 and has been rereleased occasionally.

A radio show outtake in mono is included on the On Air – Live at the BBC Volume 2 compilation released in 2013.

== Personnel ==
- John Lennon – double tracked lead vocal, lead/rhythm guitar
- Paul McCartney – harmony vocal, bass guitar
- George Harrison – harmony vocal, lead guitar
- Ringo Starr – drums

Personnel per Ian MacDonald

== Charts and certifications ==
=== Weekly charts ===
Chart (1964–1965)	Peak position
Austria (Ö3 Austria Top 40)	3
Belgium (Ultratop 50 Flanders)	3
Canada Top Singles (RPM)	1
Ireland (IRMA)	1
Finland (The Official Finnish Charts)	2
Netherlands (Single Top 100)	1
New Zealand (Lever Hit Parade)	1
Norway (VG-lista)	1
Rhodesia (Lyons Maid)	1
Sweden (Kvällstoppen)	1
Sweden (Tio i Topp)	2
UK Singles (Official Charts)	1
US Billboard Hot 100	1
US Cash Box Top 100	1
West Germany (Media Control)	3

=== Year-end charts ===
Chart (1965)	Rank
US Cash Box Top 100	19

=== Certifications and sales ===
Region	Certification	Certified units/sales
United Kingdom	—	1,000,000
United States (RIAA)	Gold	1,000,000^{^}
^{^} Shipments figures based on certification alone.
