= The Punkles =

German punk band

- Live at Rockfabrik Ludwigsburg, 5 October 2005

Background information
- Origin: Hamburg, Germany
- Genres: Punk
- Years active: 1998–2006
- Labels: Teichiku Records, Punkles Records
- Members: Joey Lennon; Sid McCartney; Rat Harrison; Markey Starkey

The Punkles were a German band performing songs by The Beatles in punk style. They formed in 1998 in Hamburg, Germany, and was a side project of Prollhead!.

After a lot of touring around Europe they toured together with Beatallica in October 2005 and in Spring 2006. Unlike Beatallica they performed the Beatles songs "as they are", singing the same lyrics and playing cover versions of the originals, just a "little" faster and with a punk feeling.

They were quite successful in Europe, as well as in Japan, where their best of CD The Punkles 1998-2003 (2003), and the following album, Pistol (2004), both entered the Top 50. Their final album For Sale! was released in April 2006. They have not appeared in public since.

== Band members ==
1998–2002	Joey Lennon – lead vocals, rhythm guitar; Dee Dee Harrison – lead guitar, vocals; Sid McCartney – bass guitar; Markey Starkey – drums, percussion, vocals
2002–2004	Joey Lennon – lead vocals, rhythm guitar; Captain ‘O Harrison – lead guitar, backing vocals; Sid McCartney – bass guitar; Markey Starkey – drums, percussion, vocals
2004	Joey Lennon – lead vocals, rhythm guitar; Stiff Harrison – lead guitar, vocals; Sid McCartney – bass guitar; Markey Starkey – drums, percussion, Vocals
2004–2006	Joey Lennon – lead vocals, rhythm guitar; Rat Harrison – lead guitar, vocals; Sid McCartney – bass guitar; Markey Starkey – drums, percussion, vocals

== Albums ==
- The Punkles (1998 - Wolverine Records) The cover is a tribute to the album Black and White by The Stranglers.
- Punk! (2002 - Bitzcore) The cover is a tribute to The Beatles album Help! and the first Sex Pistols album.
- Beat The Punkles (2002 Bitzcore - reissue of the first album) The cover is a tribute to The Beatles album A Hard Day's Night. The name was a parody of the album Meet The Beatles.
- 1998 - 2003 (Imperial/Teichiku Records) The cover is a tribute to the famous The Beatles Yesterday and Today "Butcher" cover.
- Pistol (2004 Bitzcore & Imperial/Teichiku Records) The cover is a tribute to The Beatles Revolver.
- Punkles for Sale (2006 Punkles Records & Imperial/Teichiku Records) The cover is a tribute to The Beatles Abbey Road. The name was a parody of the album Beatles for Sale.
