= Yesterday and Today =

1966 American studio album by the Beatles

Studio album by the Beatles
- Released: 15 June 1966
- Recorded: 14–17 June 1965; 13 October – 4 November 1965; 17 April – 6 May 1966
- Studios: EMI, London
- Genre: Pop
- Length: 27:33
- Label: Capitol
- Producer: George Martin

The Beatles North American chronology
Rubber Soul (1965)	Yesterday and Today (1966)	Revolver (1966)

Singles from Yesterday and Today
- 1. "Nowhere Man" Released: 21 February 1966

Alternative cover

Yesterday and Today (also rendered as "Yesterday" ... and Today in part of the original packaging) is a studio album by the English rock band the Beatles. Released in the United States and Canada in June 1966, it was their ninth album issued on Capitol Records and twelfth American release overall. Typical of the Beatles' North American discography until 1967, the album contains songs that Capitol had withheld from its configurations of the band's recent EMI albums, along with songs that the group had released elsewhere on non-album singles. Among its eleven tracks are songs from the EMI albums Help! and Rubber Soul, and three new 1966 recordings that would later appear on Revolver in countries outside North America. The album's title plays on the song "Yesterday".

Yesterday and Today is remembered primarily for the controversy surrounding its original cover image. Nicknamed the "butcher cover", it depicted the band wearing white butcher smocks and covered with decapitated baby dolls and pieces of raw meat. While the photo was intended to be a critique of the public's adoration of the Beatles, the band members claimed that it was a commentary on the Vietnam War. Others interpreted it as the Beatles protesting Capitol's practice of "butchering" their albums for the North American market by altering track lists. In response to retailers' concerns about the gory imagery, Capitol immediately withdrew the LP and replaced the cover image with a shot of the band gathered around a steamer trunk.

The original LP became a highly prized item among collectors. Since some of Capitol's pressing plants merely pasted the trunk image onto the existing LP covers, the album also encouraged a phenomenon of stripping back the top layer of artwork in the search for a banned butcher cover. Having been deleted from Capitol's catalogue in the early-to-mid-1990s, Yesterday and Today was reissued on CD in 2014.

== Background ==
In keeping with the record company's policy for all the Beatles' North American LPs until 1967, Capitol Records selected songs for Yesterday and Today from the albums the band released in Britain and other territories overseen by EMI, and from tracks issued on non-album singles outside North America. The industry preference in the US for shorter LPs facilitated this policy, as did the fact that the Beatles' A Hard Day's Night and Help! albums were presented as "genuine" soundtrack albums in the US, since the non-film songs were replaced by orchestral selections from the respective film scores. In this way, even though the group had recorded six albums for EMI by early 1966, Yesterday and Today was the Beatles' tenth American Capitol album, (Note: Counting The Beatles' Story, which had no full songs.) and twelfth overall. The two non-Capitol albums were A Hard Day's Night, then on United Artists Records, and Introducing ... The Beatles on Vee Jay Records.

That Capitol should be preparing a new Beatles album for a June release, the first of three for the year, was also consistent with the US approach to the band's LP releases, following the pattern of 1964 and 1965. Similarly, the February 1966 single "Nowhere Man" – a song Capitol omitted from its reconfigured Rubber Soul in December 1965 – was a typical practice whereby the company exploited the most commercial-sounding EMI LP tracks and signalled a forthcoming album.

== Song selection ==
Yesterday and Today included songs from the Beatles' two most recent LPs that had not yet been included on American albums, plus three from the LP they began recording in April 1966, plus two songs which until then had only been released back-to-back on a single:

- from Help!: the tracks "Yesterday" and "Act Naturally" (respectively, these were A- and B-sides of a single issued by Capitol nine months previously)
- from Rubber Soul: "Nowhere Man" and "What Goes On" (issued as the B-side of the February 1966 single), plus "Drive My Car" and "If I Needed Someone"
- both sides of the December 1965 double A-side single: "We Can Work It Out" / "Day Tripper"
- from the not-yet-released Revolver: the tracks "I'm Only Sleeping", "Doctor Robert" and "And Your Bird Can Sing". The mono mixes were different from those used for the August 1966 release of Revolver, while the stereo version of Yesterday and Today initially contained duophonic ("fake stereo") mixes of the three songs. Subsequent issues of Capitol's album used the true stereo mixes.

The collection covers a diverse range of "phases" in the Beatles' musical development, according to author Michael Frontani, given the band's maturation between June 1965 and May 1966. It includes material drawing on the American folk and country styles, and songs that anticipate British psychedelia in their drug-inspired lyrics and musical experimentation.

The hodge-podge nature in which Capitol repackaged their work for the North American market infuriated the Beatles, as it did Brian Epstein and George Martin, the band's manager and record producer, respectively. The June 1966 LP was unusual in its inclusion of tracks that had yet to be issued in the UK. These three Revolver recordings were all written by John Lennon, whose presence as a composer on Capitol's eleven-song version of Revolver was therefore greatly reduced. In a 1974 interview, Lennon complained that the Beatles "put a lot of work into the sequencing" of their albums and that they were told "there was some rule or something" against issuing the full fourteen-song LPs in the US, which led to Capitol releases such as Yesterday and Today.

== Artwork ==
=== Whitaker photo session ===
On 25 March 1966, British photographer Robert Whitaker hosted a photo session with the Beatles at his studio at 1 The Vale, off King's Road in Chelsea. Having spent three months away from the public eye, the band members had expanded their interests and were eager to depart from the formula imposed on them as pop stars, both in their music and in their presentation. (Note: Aside from carrying out overdubs for the concert film The Beatles at Shea Stadium in January, it was the band's first group activity since completing their December 1965 UK tour.) Whitaker similarly had ambitions that the photo session should break new ground. He planned a conceptual art piece titled A Somnambulant Adventure, which he later described as "a considered disruption of the conventions surrounding orthodox pop star promotional photography". Whitaker conceived the piece as a comment on the Beatles' fame, having accompanied them on their August 1965 US tour and been alarmed at the scenes of Beatlemania he witnessed then.

Whitaker assembled props such as plastic doll parts, trays of meat, white butchers' coats, a hammer and nails, a birdcage, cardboard boxes, and sets of false teeth and eyes. During the shoot, he took several reels of film of the band members interacting with the objects, culminating in a series of photos of the group dressed in the white coats and draped with pieces of meat and body parts from the baby dolls. The band were used to Whitaker's fondness for the surreal and played along. Lennon recalled that they were motivated by "boredom and resentment at having to do another photo session and another Beatles thing. We were sick to death of it." Whitaker's concept was also compatible with their own black humour and their interest in the avant-garde.

George Harrison apparently hammering nails into John Lennon's head. Whitaker intended the image to serve as the basis for the right-hand panel of his triptych.

Whitaker intended that A Somnambulant Adventure would be a triptych design across two panels of a 12-inch LP cover. Among various comments he later made on the subject, he said the panels would be the inner gatefold spread or, alternatively, the front and back cover. The butcher photo was to appear in the central portion of the triptych or on the back cover. He planned to reduce the image to just "two-and-a-quarter inches square" and set it in the middle of the panel; bejewelled silver halos would be added behind the band members' heads, and the remaining space would be designed as a Russian religious icon in colours of silver and gold. Whitaker said: "The meat is meant to represent the fans, and the false teeth and the false eyes is the falseness of representing a god-like image as a golden calf." (Note: Alternatively, he said the raw meat and dismembered limbs symbolised the violence behind Beatlemania and what the band's fans would do to them without the presence of heavy security at their concerts.)

For the front cover, or left-hand portion of the triptych, Whitaker planned to use a photo of the Beatles holding two strings of sausages, symbolising umbilical cords, that appeared to connect to the belly of a woman whose back was to camera. This photo would be set inside another image, showing a woman's womb, thereby representing the Beatles' birth and emphasising their human qualities. The third part of Whitaker's triptych was a photo of George Harrison hammering long nails into Lennon's head, suggesting trepanation. Apparently in a state of transcendence, Lennon's face would be rendered as wood grain and a horizon would be added in which ocean and sky were reversed. Whitaker credited Man Ray as a partial inspiration for this idea and said it again emphasised the band's human qualities over their idol status.

=== Cover images ===
The Beatles submitted photographs from the session for their promotional materials. Contrary to Whitaker's original vision, the band chose the butcher photo as the cover image for Yesterday and Today, and Lennon and Paul McCartney insisted that it was the Beatles' statement against war, particularly the Vietnam War. Capitol president Alan Livingston was immediately against using the image, but Epstein told him that the Beatles were adamant. In a 2002 interview published in Mojo magazine, Livingston recalled that his principal contact was with McCartney, who pushed strongly for the photo to be used as the album cover and described it as "our comment on the [Vietnam] war". Capitol's art director was more impressed with the image and prepared it to appear like a painting, with a canvas effect. (Note: The Beatles had compromised by allowing Capitol to remove any bloodstains from their white coats.)

The cover photo was soon replaced with a picture of the four band members posed around an open "steamer" trunk. This image was taken by Whitaker at Epstein's NEMS offices, near Carnaby Street. Rather than being submitted as an afterthought, the trunk photo had been pasted onto a mock-up LP sleeve and was being considered by Epstein while the Beatles filmed promotional clips for "Paperback Writer" and "Rain" at Chiswick House on 20 May. Lennon later described the replacement as "an awful looking photo of us looking just as deadbeat but supposed to be a happy-go-lucky foursome". (Note: The full butcher photo, without the cropping applied to fit LP dimensions in 1966, was included as an insert in the 1980 US compilation album Rarities.) Music critic Tim Riley describes it as "tame" but, due to the Beatles' sullen expressions, still evocative of their will to ridicule the standard band portrait.

=== Controversy and Operation Retrieve ===
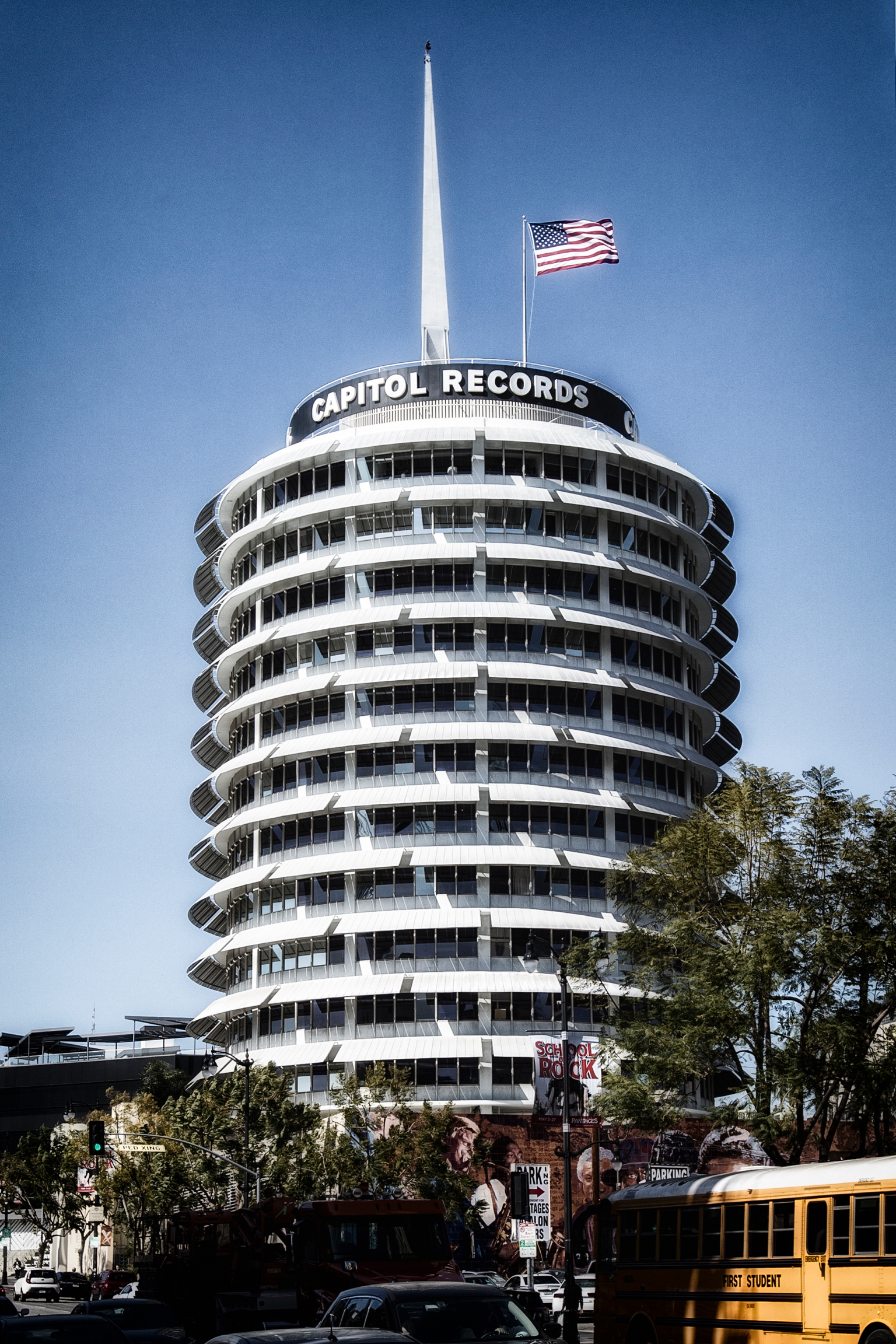
Capitol Records Building in Los Angeles (pictured in 2018). The company launched a nation-wide operation to recall all copies of the butcher sleeve.

In the United States, Capitol Records printed approximately 750,000 copies of Yesterday and Today with the "butcher cover". (Note: Early cover proofs show the word "Yesterday" printed in inverted commas in the album title. The vinyl label and back cover give the title as "Yesterday" ... and Today.) The album was scheduled for a 15 June release. Around 60,000 copies were sent to US radio and the print media and to Capitol branch offices for marketing purposes. Disc jockeys were appalled by the cover image, and many retailers found it so distasteful they refused to stock the LP. Livingston notified Epstein, who decided to have the cover replaced with the trunk photo.

On 10 June, Capitol launched "Operation Retrieve", recalling all copies of the LP from distributors to replace the offending image, as well as items such as promotional posters. The total cost to Capitol of replacing the cover and promotional materials was $250,000 (equivalent to $2.48 million in 2025), wiping out the company's initial profit. All copies were ordered shipped back to the record label, leading to its rarity and popularity among collectors. On 14 June, Capitol sent a memo to reviewers asking them to disregard the artwork and quoting Livingston's explanation that "The original cover, created in England, was intended as 'pop art' satire. However, a sampling of public opinion in the United States indicates that the cover design is subject to misinterpretation."

In Britain, the same photograph had been used to promote the "Paperback Writer" single, starting with a full-page ad, in black-and-white, in the 3 June issue of the NME. A different photo from the shoot appeared in full colour on the cover of the 11 June edition of Disc and Music Echo; lacking the doll parts but retaining the raw meat, the image was accompanied by a caption reading, "Beatles: What a Carve-Up!" The picture attracted an unfavourable response from many of the magazine's readers, and the UK music press were similarly offended by the ads for the single. To the public, the Beatles' celebration of the grotesque was something that had previously been evident only in Lennon's books of nonsensical verse and drawings. Some US commentators and music industry executives viewed the cover imagery as a statement on Capitol's policy of "butchering" the Beatles' albums for the North American market. (Note: When the promotional clips for "Paperback Writer" and "Rain" first aired in America, on the 5 June episode of The Ed Sullivan Show, the Beatles delivered a personal introduction to Sullivan with colour transparencies of the butcher cover hiding their faces.) In her study of the band's contemporary audience, sociologist Candy Leonard says that some fans recall interpreting the "butcher cover" in this way and supporting the Beatles "and their sense of humour".

The backlash against the butcher cover in the US was reported in the 25 June issue of Billboard. The cover controversy marked the first time that the Beatles' judgment was criticised by the media and distributors. At the time, Lennon's political directness was unusual for a pop star; he said the butcher sleeve was "as relevant as Vietnam", adding that "If the public can accept something as cruel as the war, they can accept this cover." McCartney called their critics "soft". When interviewed on 15 August during the band's 1966 US tour, however, Lennon called the image "unsubtle", and he and Harrison said they might have fought the recall decision had the photo been better. (Note: According to author Bob Spitz, the Beatles were "picking their battles". With the band's recording contract up for renewal in January 1967, Epstein was keen to bypass EMI and negotiate directly with Capitol, since the US was the largest and most lucrative market.) In The Beatles Anthology, Harrison dismissed the butcher cover as "gross" and "stupid", adding: "Sometimes we all did stupid things thinking it was cool and hip when it was naïve and dumb; and that was one of them." In 2007, Martin recalled that the cover had been the cause of his first strong disagreement with the band. He added: "I thought it was disgusting and in poor taste ... It suggested that they were madmen. Which they were, but not in that way."

== Release and reception ==
Professional ratings
Review scores
Source	Rating
AllMusic	3.5/5 stars
Encyclopedia of Popular Music	3/5 stars
The Rolling Stone Album Guide	5/5 stars

Despite Capitol's recall of the original LP, some distributors had already delivered stock to retailers, and copies were sold to customers in line with the scheduled 15 June release date. Capitol released Yesterday and Today with the amended cover on 20 June. Record World's reviewer included the LP among the magazine's "albums of the week" and wrote: "The new Beatle album contains a number of their recent hits ... Also some rousing new ones like 'Drive My Car.' Of course, it'll be a big package." Billboard described it as a "Hot album release" and said that the five previously unissued songs "all have singles potential", particularly "And Your Bird Can Sing" and "Drive My Car". Cash Box rated the new tracks "top notch" and said "The Fab Four outdo themselves with this stunning set ... Top of the charts is the place for this one."

The cover controversy endured, and was soon followed by controversies in Japan and the Philippines, where the Beatles performed in early July and inadvertently snubbed Filipino First Lady Imelda Marcos, and again in the US, with the furore over Lennon's "more popular than Jesus" remark. KRLA Beat berated the Beatles for supplying "the most nauseating album cover ever seen in the US", saying that the image amused no one and appeared to be designed for "shock value". The reviewer added that the band seemed ignorant of their audience's tastes, and concluded: "But those wise in the ways of the entertainment business have stuck to the same thought throughout the Beatle reign – 'No one can kill the Beatles except themselves'. And perhaps they're doing it now." Writing in the October issue of HiFi/Stereo Review, Gene Lees said that the butcher cover was indicative of the Beatles' "contempt for society" and of the same "obnoxious arrogance" that they had demonstrated in their "insulting behavior" towards Imelda Marcos. Lees opined that the group's music had deteriorated along with their charm; he found the LP "dull through repetition" and a "grab-bag", with the title track the most appealing but still a "pretty miserable" performance and lyrically "cluttered to the point of incomprehensibility".

The Recording Industry Association of America (RIAA) certified Yesterday and Today as a gold record, signifying it as a "million seller", on 8 July. The album topped the Billboard Top LPs chart in the US on 30 July, displacing Frank Sinatra's Strangers in the Night. It stayed at number 1 for five weeks and also topped the sales charts in Cash Box and Record World. During that time, the Beatles played their final concert tour, in the US and Canada, and included "Yesterday", "Nowhere Man", "If I Needed Someone" and "Day Tripper" in their set list. In February 1976, following the expiration of the Beatles' 1967 contract with EMI, Yesterday and Today was made available as an import in the UK via EMI International.

According to figures published in 2009 by former Capitol executive David Kronemyer, further to estimates he gave in MuseWire magazine, Yesterday and Today had sold 967,410 copies in the US by 31 December 1966, and 1,230,558 copies by the end of the decade. As of 2014, the album was certified 2x Multi-Platinum by the RIAA, indicating US sales of over 2 million.

== Classification in the Beatles' catalogue ==
In his 1977 book The Beatles Forever, Nicholas Schaffner commented on the enduring aspect of Capitol's reconfiguring of the Beatles' EMI LPs:

If you are an American Beatlemaniac, it is possible that you rate albums such as Beatles '65, Beatles VI, and Yesterday and Today among your favorites. Mention this to a British fan, however, and, unless he is a seasoned collector, he might have little or no idea what you're talking about ... He, in turn, may cite such unfamiliar titles (to Americans) as With the Beatles or Beatles for Sale; even should you agree on the respective excellence of, say, the Hard Day's Night or Revolver albums, you'll actually be talking about quite different compilations ... You would both be right, for until 1967 and Sgt. Pepper ... no British rock album could reasonably hope to survive the voyage across the Atlantic intact.

Writing in the 21st century, both Tim Riley and American Songwriter journalist Jim Beviglia classified Yesterday and Today as a compilation album. Joe Bosso of MusicRadar said it was one in a series of "hit-filled compilation albums" that the American Capitol label "sliced and diced" from the Beatles' original British albums.

In early 1986, Capitol announced that over the next two years, the Beatles' catalogue would be streamlined to adhere to the band's EMI releases up to Revolver. The international standardisation of their catalogue was established in 1987 with the CD release of their original EMI/Parlophone albums, followed by the two-volume Past Masters compilation containing all the band's non-album singles. The US Capitol albums were deleted on LP in 1989, although they remained available on cassette into the early 1990s. In 2014, Yesterday and Today was reissued individually and included in the Beatles' U.S. Albums box set. In a review of the box set for Mojo magazine, Jon Savage described Yesterday and Today as a "rag-bag of material" for which the withdrawn butcher cover was an apt depiction, since the album represented "the worst piece of vandalism" carried out by Capitol on the band's music. Although he acknowledged that the company's approach was in keeping with all of the band's previous US releases, Savage was critical of Capitol's failure to include "Paperback Writer" and its B-side, "Rain", and for leaving the US version of Revolver with "three key songs ... ripped from its heart".

== Collectability ==
The original LP sleeves for Yesterday and Today were assembled at Capitol's US plants situated in different cities: Los Angeles, California; Scranton, Pennsylvania; and Jacksonville, Illinois. Numbers designating where the covers originated were printed near the RIAA symbol on the back; for example, stereo copies from the Los Angeles plant were designated "5" and mono Los Angeles copies were marked "6". Mono copies outnumbered stereo copies by about ten to one, making the stereo copies far more rare and valuable to collectors. Capitol initially ordered plant managers to destroy the covers, and the Jacksonville plant delivered most of its copies to a landfill. However, faced with so many jackets already printed, Capitol decided instead to paste the replacement cover over the old ones. The new cover had to be trimmed on the open end by about 3 mm (1/8 inch) because the new sheet, known as a "slick", was not placed exactly "square" on top of the original cover. Tens of thousands of these so-called 'trunk covers' were sent out. As word of this manoeuvre became known to the public, owners of the altered cover attempted, usually unsuccessfully, to peel off the pasted-over cover, hoping to reveal the original image hidden beneath. Eventually, the soaring value and desirability of unpasted-over 'butcher covers' spurred the development of intricate and complex techniques for peeling the 'trunk cover' off in such a way that only faint horizontal glue lines remained on the original cover.

Copies that have never had the white cover pasted onto them, known as "first state" covers, are very rare and command the highest prices. Copies with the pasted-on cover intact above the 'butcher' image are known as "second state" or "pasteovers". Today, "pasteover" covers that have remained unpeeled are also becoming increasingly rare and valuable; these can be identified if Ringo Starr's black V-neck shirt from the original cover can be seen through the paste-over to the right of the trunk lid (in alignment with the word "Today" from the album title). Covers that have had the 'trunk cover' removed to reveal the underlying 'butcher' image are known as "third state" covers; these are now the most common (and least valuable, although their value varies depending on how well the cover is removed) as people continue to peel second state covers. The most valuable and highly prized first and second state 'butcher covers' are those that were never opened and remain still sealed in their original shrink-wrap. Since the first documented collector's sale of a mono "butcher cover" LP in 1974, which fetched US$457.00, the value of first state mono versions has consistently appreciated, reaching $20,000 in 2006.

In 1987, Alan Livingston released for sale 24 "first state" butcher covers from his private collection. When the original cover was scrapped in June 1966, Livingston took a case of already-sealed 'butcher cover' albums from the warehouse before they were to be pasted over with the new covers, and kept them in a closet at his home. These albums were first offered for sale at a Beatlefest convention at the Marriott Hotel near Los Angeles International Airport on Thanksgiving weekend 1987 by Livingston's son. These still-sealed pristine items, which included nineteen mono and five stereo versions, are the very rarest and most valuable 'butcher covers' in existence. These so-called "Livingston Butchers" today command premium prices among collectors, the five stereo versions being the most rare and valuable of these. In April 2006, Heritage Auction Galleries sold one of the sealed mono "Livingston Butchers" at auction in Dallas for close to $39,000.

An extremely rare original "first state" stereo copy that was not from the Livingston collection was presented for appraisal at a 2003 Chicago taping of the PBS series Antiques Roadshow. It was still in the possession of the original owner, who had bought it at Sears & Roebuck on the day of release in 1966 – the only day that the original 'butcher cover' versions were on sale before being recalled by Capitol. Although not in its original shrink-wrap, it had rarely been played and was still in excellent condition, and Roadshow appraiser Gary Sohmers valued it at US$10,000–$12,000. In 2016, a mint condition "first state" stereo copy of Yesterday and Today in shrink-wrap was sold for $125,000.

== CD release ==
Leonard writes that the album was "beloved by fans at the time", yet it became "lost for decades after the transition to digital music" and notable instead for the 'butcher cover' episode. Yesterday and Today received its first release on compact disc in 2014, individually and as part of the Beatles' box set The U.S. Albums. Mixes included on the mono/stereo 2014 CD differ from the original North American LP releases. "Drive My Car" in mono has been replaced with the UK mono mix, and "Doctor Robert" in mono omits Lennon's very quiet spoken words at the end. All tracks in stereo except "Day Tripper" and "We Can Work It Out" have been replaced with versions from the 2009 UK-format stereo CDs. The cover is the 'butcher cover'; a sticker with the 'trunk cover' is included with the CD.

== Track listing ==
All songs written by Lennon–McCartney, except where noted. Lead vocals per Ian MacDonald.

Side one
No.	Title	Writer(s)	Lead vocals	Length
1.	"Drive My Car"		McCartney and Lennon	2:25
2.	"I'm Only Sleeping"		Lennon	2:58
3.	"Nowhere Man"		Lennon	2:40
4.	"Doctor Robert"		Lennon	2:14
5.	"Yesterday"		McCartney	2:04
6.	"Act Naturally"	Johnny Russell; Voni Morrison	Starr	2:27
Total length:				14:48

Side two
No.	Title	Writer(s)	Lead vocals	Length
1.	"And Your Bird Can Sing"		Lennon	2:02
2.	"If I Needed Someone"	George Harrison	Harrison	2:19
3.	"We Can Work It Out"		McCartney	2:10
4.	"What Goes On"	Lennon–McCartney; Richard Starkey	Starr	2:44
5.	"Day Tripper"		Lennon and McCartney	2:47
Total length:				12:02

== Personnel ==
According to Ian MacDonald, except where noted:

The Beatles

- John Lennon – lead, harmony and backing vocals; rhythm, acoustic and lead guitars; harmonium; handclaps
- Paul McCartney – lead, harmony and backing vocals; bass, acoustic and lead guitars; piano; handclaps
- George Harrison – harmony and backing vocals; lead and acoustic guitars; tambourine, maracas, handclaps; lead vocals on "If I Needed Someone"
- Ringo Starr – drums, percussion, handclaps; lead vocals on "Act Naturally" and "What Goes On"

Additional musicians

- George Martin – producer, harmonium on "If I Needed Someone", string quartet arrangement on "Yesterday" (in association with McCartney)

== Charts and certifications ==
=== Weekly charts ===
Chart (1966–67)	Peak position
Canadian CHUM's Album Index	1
US Billboard Top LPs	1
US Cash Box Top 100 Albums	1
US Record World 100 Top LPs	1

=== Year-end charts ===
Year-end chart performance
Chart (1966)	Ranking
US Billboard	17
US Cash Box	46

=== Certifications ===
Region	Certification	Certified units/sales
Canada (Music Canada)	Platinum	100,000^{^}
United States (RIAA)	2× Platinum	2,000,000^{^}
^{^} Shipments figures based on certification alone.

== See also ==
- List of controversial album art
- Outline of the Beatles
- The Beatles timeline

== Sources ==
- Badman, Keith (2001). The Beatles Diary Volume 2: After the Break-Up 1970–2001. London: Omnibus Press. ISBN 978-0-7119-8307-6.
- The Beatles (2000). The Beatles Anthology. San Francisco, CA: Chronicle Books. ISBN 0-8118-2684-8.
- Brackett, Nathan; Hoard, Christian, eds. (2004). The New Rolling Stone Album Guide (4th edn). New York, NY: Fireside/Simon & Schuster. ISBN 0-7432-0169-8.
- Castleman, Harry; Podrazik, Walter J. (1976). All Together Now: The First Complete Beatles Discography 1961–1975. New York, NY: Ballantine Books. ISBN 0-345-25680-8.
- Everett, Walter (1999). The Beatles as Musicians: Revolver Through the Anthology. New York, NY: Oxford University Press. ISBN 0-19-512941-5.
- Everett, Walter (2001). The Beatles as Musicians: The Quarry Men through Rubber Soul. New York, NY: Oxford University Press. ISBN 0-19-514105-9.
- Frontani, Michael R. (2007). The Beatles: Image and the Media. Jackson, MS: University Press of Mississippi. ISBN 978-1-57806-966-8.
- Gould, Jonathan (2007). Can't Buy Me Love: The Beatles, Britain and America. London: Piatkus. ISBN 978-0-7499-2988-6. Archived from the original on 25 June 2020.
- Hunt, Chris (2002). "Robert Whitaker: Here, There & Everywhere". Mojo Special Limited Edition: 1000 Days That Shook the World (The Psychedelic Beatles – 1 April 1965 to 26 December 1967). London: Emap. pp. 64–71.
- Ingham, Chris (2006). The Rough Guide to the Beatles. London: Rough Guides/Penguin. ISBN 978-1-84836-525-4.
- Larkin, Colin, ed. (2006). The Encyclopedia of Popular Music (4th edn). London: Oxford University Press. ISBN 978-0-19-531373-4.
- Leonard, Candy (2014). Beatleness: How the Beatles and Their Fans Remade the World. New York, NY: Arcade Publishing. ISBN 978-1-62872-417-2.
- Lewisohn, Mark (2005) [1988]. The Complete Beatles Recording Sessions: The Official Story of the Abbey Road Years 1962–1970. London: Bounty Books. ISBN 978-0-7537-2545-0.
- MacDonald, Ian (1998). Revolution in the Head: The Beatles' Records and the Sixties. London: Pimlico. ISBN 978-0-7126-6697-8.
- Miles, Barry (2001). The Beatles Diary Volume 1: The Beatles Years. London: Omnibus Press. ISBN 0-7119-8308-9.
- Riley, Tim (2002) [1988]. Tell Me Why – The Beatles: Album by Album, Song by Song, the Sixties and After. Cambridge, MA: Da Capo Press. ISBN 978-0-306-81120-3.
- Riley, Tim (2011). Lennon: The Man, the Myth, the Music – The Definitive Life. London: Virgin Books. ISBN 978-0-75354020-6. Archived from the original on 2 May 2021.
- Rodriguez, Robert (2012). Revolver: How the Beatles Reimagined Rock 'n' Roll. Milwaukee, WI: Backbeat Books. ISBN 978-1-61713-009-0.
- Savage, Jon (2015). 1966: The Year the Decade Exploded. London: Faber & Faber. ISBN 978-0-571-27763-6.
- Schaffner, Nicholas (1978). The Beatles Forever. New York, NY: McGraw-Hill. ISBN 0-07-055087-5.
- Spitz, Bob (2005). The Beatles: The Biography. New York, NY: Little, Brown and Company. ISBN 1-84513-160-6.
- Spizer, Bruce (2000). The Beatles' Story on Capitol Records, Part Two: The Albums. New Orleans, LA: 498 Productions. ISBN 978-0-96626492-0. Archived from the original on 2 May 2021.
- Turner, Steve (2016). Beatles '66: The Revolutionary Year. New York, NY: Ecco. ISBN 978-0-06-247558-9.
- Winn, John C. (2009). That Magic Feeling: The Beatles' Recorded Legacy, Volume Two, 1966–1970. New York, NY: Three Rivers Press. ISBN 978-0-307-45239-9.
- Womack, Kenneth (2014). The Beatles Encyclopedia: Everything Fab Four. Santa Barbara, CA: ABC-CLIO. ISBN 978-0-313-39171-2.
