= Beatles '65 =

Studio album by the Beatles
- Released: 15 December 1964
- Recorded: 1 June 1964 ("I'll Be Back"); 11 August – 26 October 1964
- Studios: EMI, London
- Genre: Pop
- Length: 26:10
- Label: Capitol
- Producer: George Martin

The Beatles North American chronology
The Beatles' Story (1964)	Beatles '65 (1964)	The Early Beatles (1965)

Singles from Beatles '65
- 1. "I Feel Fine" / "She's a Woman" Released: 23 November 1964

Professional ratings
Review scores
Source	Rating
AllMusic	3.5/5 stars
The Encyclopedia of Popular Music	3/5 stars
The Rolling Stone Record Guide	5/5 stars

Beatles '65 is an album by the English rock band the Beatles that was issued in the United States and Canada in December 1964. Released as the North American alternative to Beatles for Sale, it was the band's fifth studio album culled by Capitol Records in the US from the Beatles' EMI releases. The LP was also issued in West Germany on the Odeon label.

In 2004, Beatles '65 was released on CD for the first time as part of The Capitol Albums, Volume 1 box set. In 2014, the album was reissued on CD, both individually and as part of the box set The U.S. Albums, using the UK mixes as remastered in 2009. In 2024, the album was reissued on vinyl as part of The Beatles: 1964 U.S. Albums in Mono, using the original master tapes rather than the UK mixes.

== Music ==
Beatles '65 includes eight of the fourteen songs from Beatles for Sale. It also includes "I'll Be Back", which was cut from the US version of the Hard Day's Night album, and both sides of the single "I Feel Fine" / "She's a Woman". The latter two songs were issued in "duophonic" stereo and included added reverb by Capitol Records' executive Dave Dexter, Jr. to cover up the use of the mono mixes sent from the UK. Other than "I'll Be Back", which was recorded on 1 June 1964, the Beatles recorded all of its songs between 11 August and 26 October 1964 at EMI Abbey Road Studios in London.

Two of the three songs written by Carl Perkins and recorded by the Beatles appear on this album. The six Beatles for Sale tracks omitted from the album were issued by Capitol on Beatles VI in June 1965.

== Reception ==
In the United States, Beatles '65 jumped from number 98 straight to number 1, making the biggest jump to the top position in the history of the Billboard album charts up to that time. It remained at number 1 for nine straight weeks from 9 January 1965. The album was the top selling non-soundtrack LP based on Billboard's year-end chart for 1965. By 31 December 1964, the album had sold 1,967,261 copies in the US; by the end of the 1960s, sales there were up to 2,327,186.

Writing in The Rolling Stone Record Guide (1983), John Swenson described Beatles '65 as the first of the band's "classic 'concept' albums". He said that the LP "worked as a musical whole" rather than merely serving as a collection of "the latest bunch of songs that could be assembled into a record in any order". Several albums were released and promoted in America during 1965 sporting a similar title to Beatles '65. These included Sinatra '65 by Frank Sinatra and Ellington '65 by Duke Ellington on Reprise Records, and Brasil '65 by Sérgio Mendes on the Beatles' own Capitol label.

== Track listing ==
All tracks written by John Lennon and Paul McCartney, except where noted.

Side one
No.	Title	Writer(s)	Lead vocals	Length
1.	"No Reply"		Lennon with McCartney	2:15
2.	"I'm a Loser"		Lennon	2:31
3.	"Baby's in Black"		Lennon and McCartney	2:02
4.	"Rock and Roll Music"	Chuck Berry	Lennon	2:32
5.	"I'll Follow the Sun"		McCartney	1:46
6.	"Mr. Moonlight"	Roy Lee Johnson	Lennon	2:35
Total length:				13:41

Side two
No.	Title	Writer(s)	Lead vocals	Length
1.	"Honey Don't"	Carl Perkins	Starr	2:56
2.	"I'll Be Back"		Lennon	2:22
3.	"She's a Woman"		McCartney	2:57
4.	"I Feel Fine"		Lennon	2:20
5.	"Everybody's Trying to Be My Baby"	Carl Perkins	Harrison	2:24
Total length:				12:59

- "Rock and Roll Music" was misprinted as being 2:02 on the original Capitol LP release. This mistake has never been corrected, even appearing on the 2024 mono vinyl reissue for The Beatles: 1964 U.S. Albums in Mono.

== Personnel ==
The Beatles

- John Lennon – rhythm guitar, harmonica (on "I'm a Loser"), vocals, lead guitar (on "I Feel Fine"), tambourine (on "Everybody's Trying to Be My Baby")
- Paul McCartney – bass guitar, vocals, piano (on "She's a Woman"), Hammond organ (on "Mr. Moonlight")
- George Harrison – lead guitar, backing vocals, lead vocals (on "Everybody's Trying to Be My Baby"), African drum (on "Mr. Moonlight")
- Ringo Starr – drums, percussion, lead vocals (on "Honey Don't")

Production

- George Martin – producer, piano (on "No Reply" and "Rock and Roll Music")

== Charts ==
Weekly chart performance
Chart (1964–66)	Peak position
Canadian CHUM's Album Index	1
US Billboard Top LPs	1
US Cash Box Top 100 Albums	1
US Record World 100 Top LPs	1
West German Musikmarkt LP Hit-Parade	9

Year-end chart performance
Chart (1965)	Ranking
US Billboard	2
US Cash Box	8

== Certifications ==
Region	Certification	Certified units/sales
Canada (Music Canada)	Platinum	100,000^{^}
United States (RIAA)	3× Platinum	3,000,000^{^}
^{^} Shipments figures based on certification alone.

== See also ==
- Outline of the Beatles
- The Beatles timeline
