= The Capitol Albums, Volume 1 =

Box set by the Beatles
- Released: 15 November 2004
- Recorded: 1963–1964, EMI Studios, London and Pathé Marconi Studios, Paris
- Genres: Rock and roll; R&B; pop
- Length: 215:56
- Labels: Apple, Capitol
- Producer: George Martin

The Beatles chronology
| Let It Be... Naked (2003) | The Capitol Albums, Volume 1 (2004) | The Capitol Albums, Volume 2 (2006) |

Professional ratings
Review scores
| Source | Rating |
|---|---|
| AllMusic | 3.5/5 stars |
| Blender | 5/5 stars |
| Robert Christgau | 5/5 stars |
| The Encyclopedia of Popular Music | 5/5 stars |
| Pitchfork Media | 6.0/10 |
| PopMatters | (favourable) |
| Uncut | 4/5 stars |

The Capitol Albums, Volume 1 is a boxed set compilation comprising the Beatles' 1964 American Capitol Records releases. The set, which features the first official stereo versions of a number of tracks on CD, was released in late 2004. The CDs were mastered from submaster tapes from the Capitol Records vaults which were originally prepared by Capitol A&R executive Dave Dexter Jr., who added reverb to several tracks and simulated stereo ("fake stereo") on some mono tracks.

The box set debuted on the Billboard 200 album chart on 4 December 2004 at number 35 with sales of 37,303 copies. It spent 6 weeks on the chart. The box was certified with gold and platinum awards on 17 December 2004 by the RIAA.

== Disc listing ==
Each disc in the collection contains both the stereo and mono versions of each album. See below for links to articles pertaining to each individual album.

Contents of The Capitol Albums, Volume 1
| Disc | Title | Catalogue number |
|---|---|---|
| 1 | Meet the Beatles! | CDP 7243 8 66875 2 4 |
| 2 | The Beatles' Second Album | CDP 7243 8 66877 2 2 |
| 3 | Something New | CDP 7243 8 66876 2 3 |
| 4 | Beatles '65 | CDP 7243 8 66874 2 5 |

== Promotional disc ==
In the weeks prior to the release of the box set, a promotional sampler disc was sent to radio stations and reviewers. It included eight tracks, with a stereo (tracks 1–8) and mono (tracks 9–16) version of each.

All songs by Lennon–McCartney, except where noted.

1. "All My Loving"
2. "I Wanna Be Your Man"
3. "I Call Your Name"
4. "Roll Over Beethoven" (Chuck Berry)
5. "Things We Said Today"
6. "If I Fell"
7. "She's a Woman"
8. "I'm a Loser"

== Release details ==
The CD box set was released in various countries in November 2004.

| Country | Date | Label | Catalog |
|---|---|---|---|
| United Kingdom | 15 November 2004 | Apple Records, Capitol Records | 8754002 |
| France | 15 November 2004 | Parlophone | |
| Germany | 15 November 2004 | Apple Records | |
| Australia | 15 November 2004 | EMI | 8753482 |
| United States | 16 November 2004 | Apple Records, Capitol Records | CDP 7243 8 66878 2 1 |
| Canada | 16 November 2004 | Apple Records, Capitol Records | |
| Japan | 17 November 2004 | Toshiba-EMI | TOCP 67601–04 |

== See also ==
- Outline of the Beatles
- The Beatles timeline
