= What You're Doing =

- Sheet music cover

Song by the Beatles

from the album Beatles for Sale
- Released: 4 December 1964
- Recorded: 29–30 September & 26 October 1964
- Studio: EMI, London
- Genre: Jangle pop
- Length: 2:30
- Label: Parlophone
- Songwriter: Lennon–McCartney
- Producer: George Martin

"What You're Doing" is a song by the English rock band the Beatles from their album Beatles for Sale, released in December 1964. It was written by Paul McCartney, although credited to Lennon–McCartney. The song was one of eight original compositions on Beatles for Sale. In North America, where Capitol Records typically altered the content of the band's albums, "What You're Doing" instead appeared on the 1965 US release Beatles VI.

== Composition ==
"What You're Doing" was written by McCartney in Atlantic City on 30 August 1964, shortly following the end of the Beatles' 1964 world tour. Throughout the song, McCartney adds to the rhyme scheme by combining a single, two-syllable word with two one-syllable words (i.e. "Look what you're doing, I'm feeling blue and lonely ... You got me runnin', and there's no fun in it"). He used the same technique on "She's a Woman", which was also recorded during the sessions for Beatles for Sale. Inspired by his often turbulent relationship with girlfriend Jane Asher, McCartney has gone on record as not liking "What You're Doing", regarding it as "a bit of filler" for the album. Neither the Beatles, nor McCartney as a solo artist, ever performed the song live.

The track features a unique four-bar drum intro by Ringo Starr, which is repeated just before the song's coda, the drum intro was influenced by The Ronettes, Be My Baby. The guitar riff is played by George Harrison on his Rickenbacker 12-string electric guitar. The sound was influential on the Byrds, who crafted their sound partly on the Beatles' use of the Rickenbacker (and used a similar riff on their version of Bob Dylan's "Mr. Tambourine Man"). Harrison in turn adopted influences from the Byrds in his 1965 song "If I Needed Someone".

== Recording ==
The Beatles first attempted to record "What You're Doing" on 29 September 1964, but only the basic rhythm track was taped over seven takes (with take seven being deemed the best). The following day, after finishing the recording of "Every Little Thing", the group recorded five more takes, with take 11 being deemed the "best;" music historian Mark Lewisohn notes that at this point, the song differed from the final version in that "its breaks between choruses were less tight, the middle eight instrumental break was performed an octave above the vocals and it had a 1 & 1/2 second pause preceding a reprise instrumental coda." The group rejected the 29-30 September takes and re-recorded the song in its final form on 26 October, immediately after finishing work on the Carl Perkins-cover "Honey Don't". "What You're Doing" was the last song to be recorded for the Beatles for Sale album.

== Love remix ==
The song was sampled to create a medley, along with "Drive My Car" and "The Word", on the band's 2006 remix album Love. "What You're Doing" shares a number of characteristics with (the also predominantly McCartney-written) "Drive My Car", particularly the home key (D major), meter (4/4), and chord progression (alternating between B minor and G major).

== Personnel ==
According to Ian MacDonald:

- Paul McCartney – lead vocal, bass
- John Lennon – harmony vocal, acoustic rhythm guitar
- George Harrison – harmony vocal, twelve-string lead guitar
- Ringo Starr – drums
- George Martin – piano
