= She's a Woman =

1964 single by the Beatles

- US picture sleeve (reverse)

Single by the Beatles
- A-side: "I Feel Fine"
- Released: 23 November 1964
- Recorded: 8 October 1964
- Studio: EMI, London
- Genre: Rock and roll; pop rock; pop-blues; R&B
- Length: 3:00
- Label: Capitol (US); Parlophone (UK)
- Songwriter: Lennon–McCartney
- Producer: George Martin

The Beatles US singles chronology
"Matchbox" (1964)	"I Feel Fine" / "She's a Woman" (1964)	"Eight Days a Week" (1965)

The Beatles UK singles chronology
"A Hard Day's Night" (1964)	"I Feel Fine" / "She's a Woman" (1964)	"Ticket to Ride" (1965)

"She's a Woman" is a song by the English rock band the Beatles, written primarily by Paul McCartney and credited to Lennon–McCartney. It was released on a non-album single in November 1964 as the B-side to "I Feel Fine", except in North America, where it also appeared on the album Beatles '65, released in December 1964. Though it was the B-side, it charted in the US, reaching number four on the Billboard Hot 100 and number eight on the Cash Box Top 100. The song originated in McCartney's attempt to write a song in the style of Little Richard. The lyrics include the first reference to drugs in a Beatles song, with the line "turn(s) me on" referring to marijuana.

The Beatles recorded "She's a Woman" in October 1964, during the sessions for their album Beatles for Sale. McCartney composed it quickly, writing much of the song at EMI Recording Studios shortly before recording. With a sparse arrangement, John Lennon's rhythm guitar hits on the offbeats, allowing room for the bass to be the centre of the recording. McCartney's prominent bass was to that point the loudest heard on a Beatles recording, anticipating his high-profile bass lines in later songs. His vocal extends near the top of his register, heard especially as he strains near the song's opening. The song has subsequently appeared on compilation albums such as the UK edition of Rarities; Past Masters, Volume One and Mono Masters.

"She's a Woman" has received praise from several music critics and musicologists for McCartney's strong vocal and the band's loud backing, though some have criticised its lyrics as weak. In addition to recording the song twice for BBC radio, the Beatles regularly performed the song during their 1965 and 1966 tours. An August 1965 performance appeared on the 1977 live album The Beatles at the Hollywood Bowl while one from June 1966 was included on the 1996 compilation Anthology 2. In his post-Beatles career, McCartney has occasionally performed the song in concert, including an acoustic version that appeared on his 1991 live album Unplugged (The Official Bootleg). Charles River Valley Boys, Jeff Beck and Scritti Politti are among the artists who have covered the track.

== Background and composition ==
Paul McCartney began composing the lyrics and melody to "She's a Woman" on 8 October 1964, the same day that it was recorded, and finished it quickly. Appearing on the radio programme Top Gear on 17 November 1964, he explained that he only had "about one verse" ready on the morning of the session, finishing the rest of the song once in the studio. In his authorised biography, Many Years from Now, he recalls that the initial idea came to him while walking around the streets of St John's Wood, but is unsure whether he finished the song at home, on his way to the studio, or once actually there. Comparing it to his earlier composition "Can't Buy Me Love", he further recalls the song as an attempt to write "a bluesy thing" in the style of one of his favourite singers, Little Richard. In a 1972 interview, John Lennon identifies the song as McCartney's, but suggests that he may have helped with the middle. In a 1980 interview with Playboy, he again identifies the composition as McCartney's, but suggests he likely contributed some lyrics.

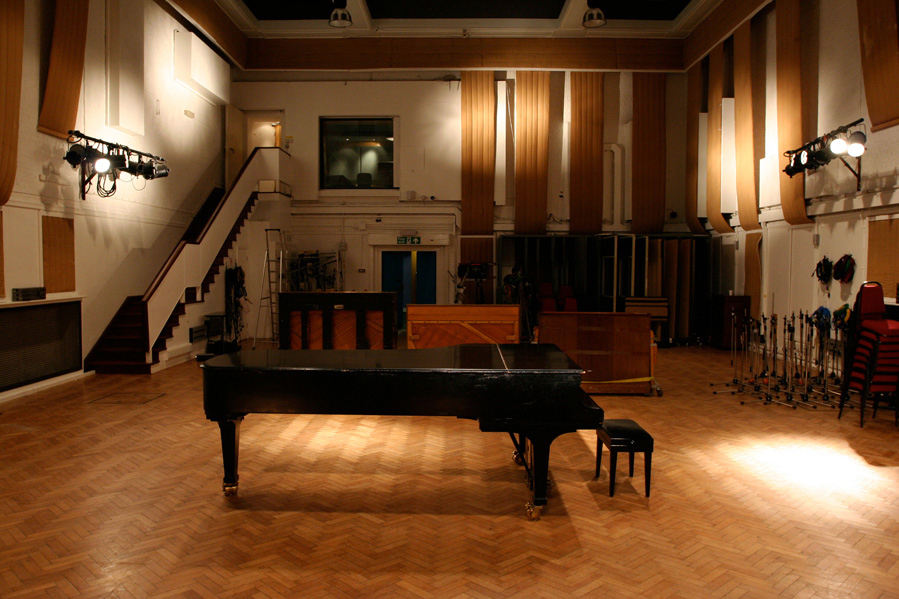
Studio Two at EMI Studios in London, where "She's a Woman" was mostly written and then recorded.

"She's a Woman" is mainly in the key of A major, with brief shifts to C-sharp minor, and is in 4/4 time. Besides its two short bridge sections, the song only uses the chords I, IV and V. Music scholar Thomas MacFarlane characterises the song as a "synthesis of rock and blues inflections with elements derived from country and western or folk styles". Variously described as rock and roll, pop rock, R&B, or "perky pop-blues", the song is a long-form blues number with a four-bar bridge. Musicologist Walter Everett characterises the format as structurally similar to "Can't Buy Me Love", joining a minor pentatonic verse with a major mode bridge. (Note: "Can't Buy Me Love" features a minor pentatonic verse-refrain and a major mode chorus.) Similar to Cliff Richard's song "Move It", the verse is twenty four-bars rather than the more typical twelve-bar format, making the four-bar bridge sound especially short. Everett suggests the short bridge quickly returning to the verse creates a "formal ambiguity".

Comparing its beginning to "I Want to Hold Your Hand", Everett writes that before the song's beat has been established, the "sneaky accenting" of offbeats results in an "off-center introduction". For the first four bars, the rhythm guitar and piano are the only instruments heard, with the "heavily accented backbeat" not heard as such until the bass and drums begin playing, "'proving' the correct metrical accent". Music critic Tim Riley writes the "clipped guitar yelps" of the opening "tease the ear in a simpler way than the fade-in to 'I Want to Tell You' will". Rather than playing a typical rhythm guitar section, Lennon provides a distinct sound to the track by only hitting the off-beats, adding a reggae accent to the song, and which McCartney later explained, "left a lot of space for the rest of the stuff". Musicologist Ian MacDonald calls McCartney's legato bass line the "structural centrepiece" of the song and that "without it, the other elements in this stark arrangement would make no sense". Everett suggests it is instructive to compare "the simple form and involved melodicism" of the song against "the opposite emphases" heard on Ray Charles's "I Got a Woman". Pollack contends that the song pairs well with "I Feel Fine", in particular the "euphoric subtext of the words", its stylised blues and the similar V–IV–I intros. MacDonald characterises it as the second single by the Beatles to be based on blues changes, the first being the March 1964 release "Can't Buy Me Love"/"You Can't Do That".

McCartney sings the song near the top of his vocal register, straining in the opening to hit a high A. The singer explains that though his lover does not give him presents they each still love each other. Several lines rhyme with the second-to-last word, as in "lonely" with "only [fooling]" and "jealous" with "well as [loving]". Its lyric includes the first reference to drugs in the Beatles' catalogue, with the line "turn(s) me on when I feel lonely" referring to marijuana. The Beatles had one of their earliest experiences with the drug six weeks earlier – smoking with Bob Dylan in New York City during their 1964 North American tour – with Lennon reflecting in 1980 that "[w]e were so excited to say 'turn me on' – you know, about marijuana and all that, using it as an expression". (Note: On first hearing "I Want to Hold Your Hand", Dylan misheard "I can't hide" as "I get high", assuming it was a drug reference.)

== Recording ==
The Beatles recorded "She a Woman" on 8 October 1964, during the sessions for their fourth album, Beatles for Sale. Recording took place in EMI's Studio Two, with George Martin producing the session, assisted by balance engineer Norman Smith. The basic track features guitars, drums, bass and a lead vocal from McCartney. Everett suggests that Lennon's damped Rickenbacker 325 Capri results in a sound like "a Motown offbeat 'chick' rhythm guitar". The song's first take was in a rockabilly style, not yet using the syncopated chords heard on the completed version. On take five, the band moved into an extended jam with McCartney screaming, the complete take lasting over six minutes. (Note: The "long jam" is sometimes identified as take seven, due to Martin introducing it as, "Take five, is it? Take seven". Beatles writer John C. Winn suggests that he was likely confused due to several false starts.) Journalist Mark Hertsgaard calls the take "a spirited, if somewhat ragged, jam", while Everett suggests it comes closer to Lennon's 1969 song "Cold Turkey" than any other pre-1968 recording. After two more attempts, take six was marked "best".

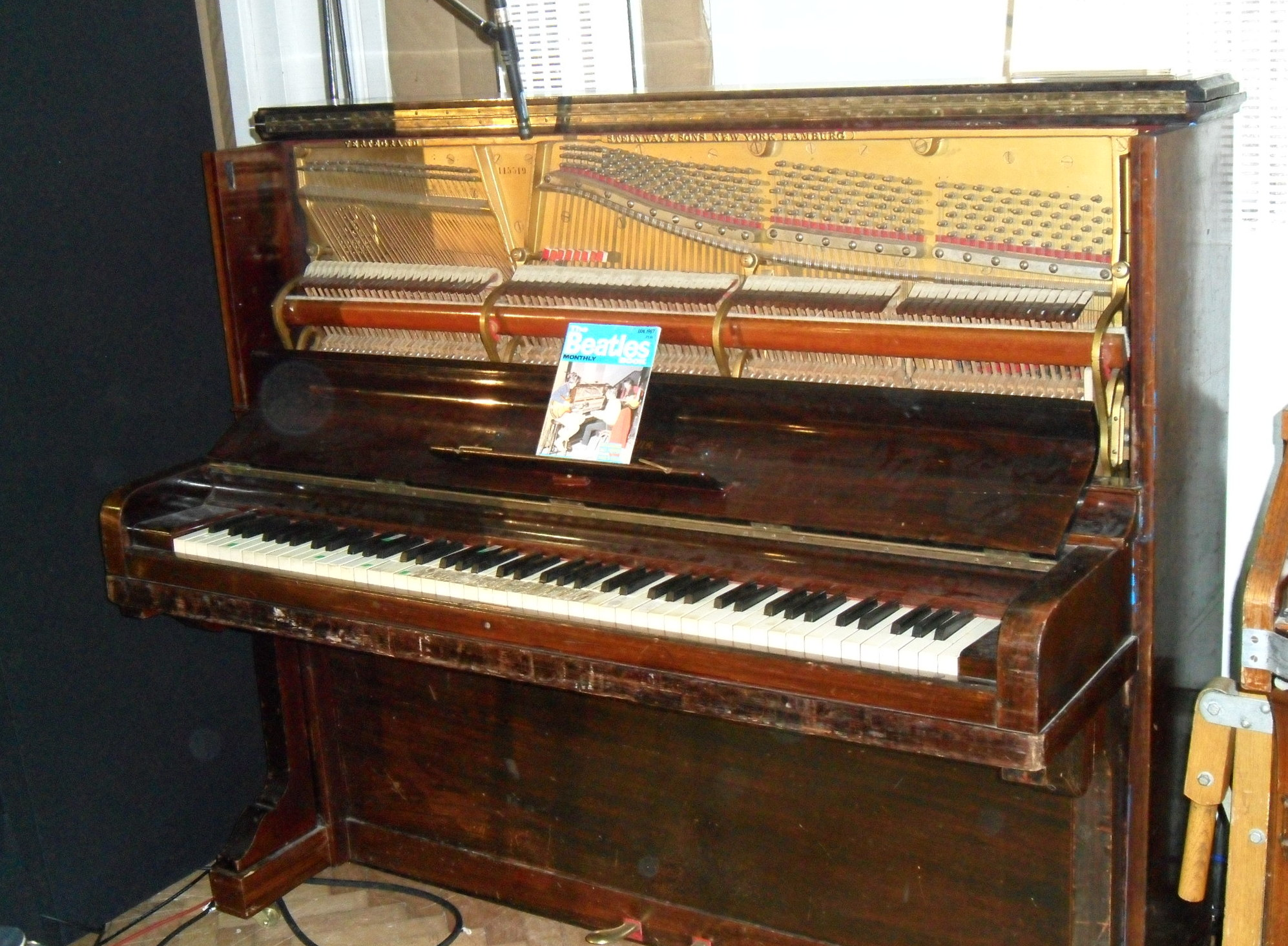
"Mrs Mills", the Steinway Vertegrand tack piano McCartney plays on "She's a Woman".

After breaking for dinner, the band completed the track with overdubs onto take six. Ringo Starr added further percussion with a chocalho – a shaker made of metal and filled with either lead shot or peas. Along with double tracking his original vocal, McCartney played Studio Two's Steinway Vertegrand tack piano – dubbed "Mrs Mills" in reference to the music hall pianist Gladys Mills – substituting it on the second verse in place of a lead guitar. (Note: The same piano was played on several Beatles songs, including "I Want to Tell You", "Lady Madonna", "Penny Lane", "With a Little Help from My Friends" and "You Never Give Me Your Money".) George Harrison did not play on the basic track, but instead overdubbed a double tracked guitar solo with his Gretsch Country Gent. Playing the solo nearly identically each time – capturing the same ornamental hammer-ons, pull-offs and portamento slides – the double tracking alters the guitar's tonal qualities. McCartney was pleased with the final recording, calling it "a nice little R&B thing".

On 12 October, Martin and Smith returned to Studio Two to remix the track for mono and stereo. McCartney's prominently featured bass, to that point the loudest bass heard on a Beatles track, necessitated the mix be ducked whenever it left the home triad. The mono mix made on 12 October was meant exclusively for UK release, while a later mono remix made on 21 October was made for the US market, the latter fading out one second earlier. The 21 October mix was made in EMI's Room 65, typically designated as the studio's "experimentation room". After receiving the US master, Capitol executive Dave Dexter Jr. added heavy echo to the tape, drowning out the sound of McCartney's piano. The stereo version heard on US releases is fake stereo, reprocessed from the mono American masters.

== Release and reception ==
Capitol released "She's a Woman" in the US as the B-side to "I Feel Fine" on 23 November 1964. EMI's Parlophone label released the same single in the UK four days later. Journalist Neil Spencer suggests that the song would have been an album track on Beatles for Sale were it not for the dearth of new Lennon–McCartney compositions. In the US – where Capitol reconfigured the Beatles' albums, reducing the number of songs and using single A- and B-sides to create further LP releases – the song appeared on the North American album Beatles '65, released on 15 December 1964. It has since appeared on the 1978 British compilation album Rarities, while the first true stereo mix of the song to be released in the US appeared on the 1988 compilation Past Masters, Volume One. The mono mix was subsequently included on the 2009 Mono Masters compilation.

Among contemporaneous reviews, Derek Johnson in the NME described "She's a Woman" as "arresting and ear-catching", and highlighted the track's "pounding beat" and blues-inflected vocal. Billboard predicted an immediate chart hit for both sides of the single and recognised the record as a "gift to Capitol on the group's first anniversary with the label". The UK single release sold 800,000 units within five days and over a million by 9 December. In the US, where five albums and sixteen singles had been released in the first seven months of 1964, the ensuing lull of new Beatles material led to fans highly anticipating the next single's release. The US release sold more than a million copies in its first week. "She's a Woman" became a hit in its own right, mostly on the strength of point of sale requests, peaking at number four on the Billboard Hot 100 and remaining on the chart for nine weeks.

In all respects an experimental recording, "She's a Woman" is driven by its author's cannabis-cultivated curiosity to pursue every "what if?" he could think of. At the same time, the overriding priority was to rock hard – a token of a group which, until 1966, continued to think of themselves as "just a little R&B band".

— Author and critic Ian MacDonald, Revolution in the Head

In a retrospective review for AllMusic, Stephen Thomas Erlewine says the song demonstrates the Beatles' ability to "rock really, really hard". MacDonald describes the track as "the most extreme sound the Beatles had manufactured to date". Writing that it is the first Beatles song to feature a high profile bass line, he opines that it foreshadows McCartney's later "striving to get his instrument 'up' in volume, tone, and octave". He further characterises the recording as outré, and groups it with "What You're Doing" and "Eight Days a Week" as one of McCartney's late-1964 recording experiments. (Note: In particular, the "overdriven guitar and drop-in piano" on "What You're Doing" and the "pioneering fade-in" of "Eight Days a Week".) Everett writes that his piano playing on the song "[took] his keyboard work to a new level", while describing Harrison's guitar solo as rockabilly in style, heavily influenced by guitarist Carl Perkins. (Note: "She's a Woman", "Baby's in Black" and "Kansas City" are the only three Beatles songs released in 1964 to include string bending. Everett suggests these instances anticipate McCartney's Epiphone Casino bending on the 1965 songs "Ticket to Ride", "The Night Before" and "Another Girl".) Rolling Stone critic Rob Sheffield opines that the song's "power-chord thud" anticipates the sound of the heavy metal band Black Sabbath.

Spencer calls the song McCartney's "stoned out-take on his Little Richard legacy", and musicologist Alan W. Pollack describes the song as McCartney's "most outrageous vocal performance" since "Long Tall Sally", anticipating that of the 1969 songs "Get Back" and "Oh! Darling". He further writes that as the song progresses, the vocal gets "steadily freer, louder, and more extroverted". Calling the song a "throaty McCartney rocker", Hertsgaard describes the line, "My love don't give me presents / I know that she's no peasant" as "one of the most awkward rhymes in the Beatles' catalogue". MacDonald also dismisses the lyrics, calling them "[k]nowingly functional" and only notable for the marijuana reference. Riley writes that, were it not for Starr's cymbal smashing in the four-bar break, the song would be "almost too tightly strung".

== Other versions ==
=== The Beatles ===
British law in the 1960s compelled BBC Radio to play material recorded especially for the medium. In keeping with this practice, the Beatles played "She's a Woman" twice for radio, recording for the BBC Light Programmes Top Gear and The Beatles (Invite You to Take a Ticket to Ride) on 17 November 1964 and 26 May 1965, respectively. The latter, broadcast on 7 June 1965, was among the last set the Beatles contributed to BBC Radio. EMI included the November 1964 performance on the 1994 album Live at the BBC.

The Beatles regularly performed the song during their 1965 and 1966 tours, sequencing it second in the set list after "Twist and Shout", "I Feel Fine" or "Rock and Roll Music". Though the band performed the song on 15 August 1965 at Shea Stadium in New York City, it was omitted from the documentary film The Beatles at Shea Stadium because the film cameras were being reloaded during the song. The 1977 live album The Beatles at the Hollywood Bowl includes a performance of "She's a Woman" from the 30 August 1965 show at the Hollywood Bowl in Los Angeles. Author Jonathan Gould describes this performance as the "definitive version" of the song, while pop historian Robert Rodriguez writes that the combination of "Twist and Shout" and "She's a Woman" "[kicks] things off with a bang". In 1996, Apple Records included the Beatles' 30 June 1966 performance from the Nippon Budokan in Tokyo on the compilation Anthology 2. Author John Winn describes the concert as a particularly poor performance, and Beatles road manager Neil Aspinall later suggested that the lack of screaming from the respectful Japanese audience caused the group to realise they were playing out of tune.

McCartney has occasionally performed the song in his live shows, including it on his 2004 Summer Tour's set list. He performed the song in a 25 January 1991 set, played on acoustic and filmed by MTV for their series Unplugged. Given the vocal strain needed to perform the original version, he found it necessary to transpose the song down a fourth from its original key of A to E. The MTV performance was included on McCartney's 1991 album Unplugged (The Official Bootleg).

=== Cover versions ===
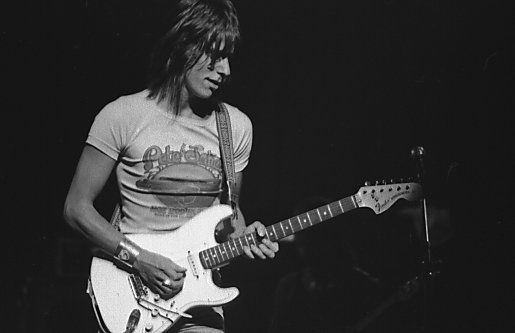
A 1975 cover version by Jeff Beck (pictured 1973) transformed "She's a Woman" into a reggae song, complete with a talk box.

The American bluegrass band Charles River Valley Boys included "She's a Woman" on their 1966 album of bluegrass arranged Beatles covers, Beatle Country. (Note: The cover was later included on a 2007 compilation album of music from Elektra Records, Forever Changing: The Golden Age of Elektra 1963–1973.) Critic Richie Unterberger counts the cover as among several on the LP that few listeners would have thought possible to arrange into a bluegrass context. In a retrospective assessment coinciding with the album's 1995 CD re-release, Adrea Moed of CMJ New Music Monthly magazine remarked that the playing on the cover displays a "technical virtuosity [that] almost makes you forget [the song’s] origins".

British guitarist Jeff Beck covered "She's a Woman" on his 1975 album Blow by Blow, produced by George Martin. Months earlier, he played the song with the band Upp for the BBC documentary Five Faces of Guitar. Keyboard player Max Middleton suggested the song for the album, having come up with a calypso-like arrangement on his own. Middleton later recalled that "George hated it, but Jeff loved it, so we did it". Beck further altered the arrangement into a reggae instrumental, following the original vocal melody with his guitar, and incorporated a talk box. Mark Kirschenmann of AllMusic describes the arrangement as clever, and author Martin Power describes the track in similarly favourable terms, with its "flashes of syncopation, falling blues scales and the occasional use of the voice bag".

British pop band Scritti Politti covered "She's a Woman" with Jamaican dancehall musician Shabba Ranks. Reaching number twenty on the UK Singles Chart and number 14 on the UK Airplay Chart in April 1991, the recording immediately preceded a lengthy hiatus from Scritti Politti frontman Green Gartside, who did not return to recording until 1999. Later included on the band's 2011 compilation album Absolute, Terry Staunton of Record Collector magazine describes the track as a "trenchtown jolly-up" cover.

== Personnel ==
According to Ian MacDonald, except where noted:

- Paul McCartney – double tracked vocal, bass, piano
- John Lennon – rhythm guitar
- George Harrison – double tracked lead guitar (Note: While Everett and Winn each write Harrison played lead guitar, MacDonald speculates on the basis of sound and playing style that Harrison did not play on the final recording and that it was instead McCartney who overdubbed the lead guitar solo. Authors Jean-Michel Guesdon & Philippe Margotin dispute MacDonald's suggestion, countering that the solo displays Chet Atkins influence on Harrison and that it corresponds "perfectly" to Harrison's style.)
- Ringo Starr – drums, chocalho

== Charts ==
=== Weekly charts ===
1964–65 weekly chart performance
Chart (1964–65)	Peak position
Belgium (Ultratop 50 Wallonia)	7
Canada Top Singles (RPM)	18
New Zealand (Lever Hit Parade)	1
US Billboard Hot 100	4
US Cash Box Top 100	8
US Record World Top 100	7

=== Year-end charts ===
1965 year-end chart performance
Chart (1965)	Ranking
US Cash Box	99
