= Baby's in Black =

- Sheet music cover

Song by the Beatles

from the album Beatles for Sale
- Released: 4 December 1964
- Recorded: 11 August 1964
- Studio: EMI, London
- Genre: Folk rock
- Length: 2:02
- Label: EMI, Parlophone, Capitol
- Songwriter: Lennon–McCartney
- Producer: George Martin

"Baby's in Black" is a song by the English rock band the Beatles, co-written by John Lennon and Paul McCartney. It appears on the United Kingdom album Beatles for Sale and on the United States album Beatles '65, both released in 1964.

== Composition ==
"Baby's in Black" has a 12/8 time signature and a moderate tempo. An AllMusic critic described the song as "a love lament for a grieving girl that was perhaps more morose than any previous Beatles' song." Musicologist Alan W. Pollack notes that the song is relatively complex in format, with a refrain, bridge, and a guitar solo. He describes the song as having a "mishmash" of stylistic elements—among them, "bluesy" chords and country music-inspired vocals.

== Recording ==
"Baby's in Black" was recorded on 11 August 1964, and was the first song recorded for Beatles for Sale. Lennon and McCartney sang their vocal parts simultaneously through the same microphone. This was done at their own insistence in order to achieve a closer feel to the performance. McCartney was subsequently contacted by their music publisher in 1964 inquiring as to which melody line was the main tune (i.e., Paul's higher or John's lower melody). McCartney later said that he told the publisher they were both the main melody.

== Live performances ==
The Beatles performed "Baby's in Black" live during their appearances from late 1964 until 1966 on their final tour. McCartney said they introduced the song by saying, "'And now for something different.' ... We used to put that in there, and think, 'Well, they won't know quite what to make of this, but it's cool.'" In 1996, a live version of "Baby's in Black" was released as a B-side to "Real Love", the second single from their Anthology project. 20 years later, it was included as a bonus track in 2016 expanded live album Live at the Hollywood Bowl.

== Covers ==
- Canadian rock band Big Sugar recorded a cover of "Baby's in Black" during the sessions of their 1998 album, Heated. Though the cover did not make it onto the album, the cover was featured on the 25th anniversary deluxe edition of the band's 1996 album Hemi-Vision, which was released in 2020.
- American jazz pianist Brad Mehldau recorded a version in September 2020 at Philharmonie de Paris for his live solo album, Your Mother Should Know: Brad Mehldau Plays The Beatles.
- Panamanian musician Rubén Blades and accompanying band Seis Del Solar covered the song on their critically acclaimed 1992 release "Amor Y Control".

== Personnel ==
- John Lennon – vocal, acoustic rhythm guitar
- Paul McCartney – vocal, bass guitar
- George Harrison – lead guitar
- Ringo Starr – drums, tambourine

Personnel per Ian MacDonald
