= The Capitol Albums, Volume 2 =

Box set by the Beatles
- Released: 11 April 2006
- Recorded: 1962–1965, Abbey Road Studios, London, United Kingdom
- Genres: Rock, rock and roll
- Length: 226:56
- Labels: Apple, Capitol
- Producer: George Martin

The Beatles chronology
| The Capitol Albums, Volume 1 (2004) | The Capitol Albums, Volume 2 (2006) | Love (2006) |

Professional ratings
Review scores
| Source | Rating |
|---|---|
| AllMusic | 3.5/5 stars |
| The Encyclopedia of Popular Music | 5/5 stars |
| Pitchfork | 7.5/10 |

The Capitol Albums, Volume 2 is a box set compilation composed of the Beatles' 1965 American Capitol Records releases. The set, which contains stereo and mono versions of all 92 tracks (with all of the tracks on The Early Beatles and many of the tracks on Beatles VI being released in stereo on compact disc for the first time), was announced on 22 March 2006.

Differences between the stereo and mono mixes are one of the main draws for collectors. There are also a few significant musical differences to other versions of these recordings, such as a false start on the stereo version of "I'm Looking Through You".

As with The Capitol Albums, Volume 1, the CDs did not contain the original George Martin mixes released in Britain in the 1960s. Instead, the CDs were mastered from tapes prepared by Capitol A&R executive Dave Dexter Jr., who, in 1965 took sub-master tapes from Capitol Records' vaults and added reverb to several tracks and simulated stereo on some mono tracks.

The official release date of 11 April 2006 was the 42nd anniversary of the Beatles holding a record 14 positions in the Billboard Hot 100 chart. This was one week after the Beatles monopolized the top 5 positions in the Billboard Hot 100 chart. The UK release was slightly earlier than the official date. Some advance copies were circulated and pre-orders were also shipped early.

The box set debuted on the Billboard 200 album chart on 29 April 2006, at number 46, with approximate sales of 27,000 copies. It was awarded a gold record by the RIAA on 19 May 2006.

== Incorrect mono versions ==
Box sets and sampler discs made available prior to the 11 April release date have incorrect mono versions of Beatles VI and Rubber Soul. The incorrect mono versions were only released in this set. These "fold-down" mono versions are actually the stereo mixes consolidated into both speakers. Although the versions are technically in mono (in the sense that the sound in both the right and left channels is the same), they are not the actual mono mixes released by Capitol in 1965. The mono mixes on the original US vinyl releases of The Early Beatles and Help! were already fold-down versions of the stereo mixes, but the US vinyl releases of both Beatles VI and Rubber Soul had contained dedicated mono mixes.

Beatles author Bruce Spizer, who also wrote the set's in-depth liner notes, told the Beatles fan website What Goes On that a "third party mastering facility incorrectly sent stereo-to-mono mixdowns" to be pressed, rather than the vintage mono mixes. It was initially unknown whether this error was restricted to one pressing plant or all pressings, but now seems to have involved all sets prior to the issue of the "corrected" version.

An explanation for the mistake given at the time was that Capitol anticipated that the stereo versions would sometimes be played back in mono, and wanted to test how they would sound if played that way (for Beatles VI and Rubber Soul; this concern not being an issue for the other two). They then made fold-down copies of the stereo versions of these, just to test how they would sound in mono, and by mistake someone caused these recordings to be issued in lieu of the true mono mixes.

Discs with the correct mono mixes have a slightly longer playing time than the mispressed discs:

Disc 1 = 52:25
Disc 2 = 56:16 (disc with incorrect mono version is 56:01)
Disc 3 = 59:07
Disc 4 = 59:08 (disc with incorrect mono version is 59:01)

== Disc listing ==
Contents of The Capitol Albums, Volume 2
| Disc | Title | Catalogue number |
|---|---|---|
| 1 | The Early Beatles | CDP 0946 3 57498 2 3 |
| 2 | Beatles VI | CDP 0946 3 57499 2 2 |
| 3 | Help! (US version) | CDP 0946 3 57500 2 7 |
| 4 | Rubber Soul (US version) | CDP 0946 3 57501 2 6 |

- Each disc in the collection contains both the stereo and mono mixes of each album.

In the weeks prior to the official release of the boxed set, a promotional disc was circulated. Like the previous Volume 1, it contains both the stereo and mono versions of eight songs.

== See also ==
- Outline of the Beatles
- The Beatles timeline
