= Dave Dexter Jr. =

American music journalist and record company executive (1915–1990)

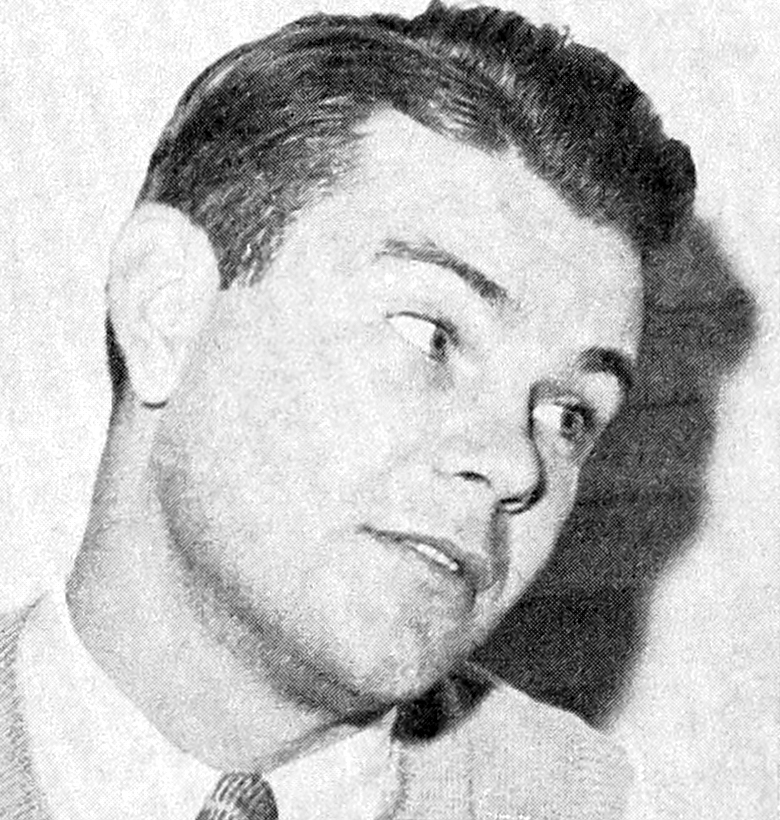
Dave Dexter Jr. in 1948

David Edwin Dexter Jr. (November 25, 1915 – April 19, 1990) was an American music journalist, record company executive, and producer known primarily for his long association with Capitol Records. He worked with many important figures in jazz and traditional popular music, including Count Basie, Peggy Lee, Duke Ellington, and Frank Sinatra. Dexter is also known for his role in Capitol's turning down the early singles by the Beatles as well as his subsequent decisions regarding their packaging, and his sometimes altering their recordings for the American market.

== Jazz and pop career ==
Dexter was born and raised in Kansas City, Missouri. His career in music began in journalism, as he wrote about music for the Kansas City Journal-Post and then for Down Beat magazine in the late 1930s and early 1940s. During this time, he produced an album entitled Kansas City Jazz which documented his hometown's jazz scene, showcasing such talents as Count Basie, Lester Young, and Big Joe Turner.

In 1943, Dexter joined Capitol Records, established the previous year, initially writing press releases and doing other publicity work, but eventually rising to the position of A&R representative. Over the next three decades, he signed some of the biggest names in music to the label, including Frank Sinatra, Stan Kenton, Peggy Lee, Nat King Cole, Duke Ellington, Woody Herman, Kay Starr, and Julia Lee. He produced the first Dixieland recordings to reach the music charts, and was responsible for the landmark 1944 collection The History of Jazz. He also compiled a series of world music albums, Capitol of the World, which showcased music from around the world, which included over 400 titles from 1956 into the early 1970s. Capitol of the World LPs included German Beer Drinking Songs, A Visit to Finland, Kasongo! Music from the Belgian Congo, and other titles. He also served as editor of the company's own publication, Capitol News. His productions included the Duke Ellington classic "Satin Doll".

Dexter wanted the label to focus more on jazz than on rock and roll and hit singles. In a 1956 memo, he complained that the music business was being driven by the tastes of children, and derided current hits by such artists as Elvis Presley and Guy Mitchell as "juvenile and maddeningly repetitive."

== The Beatles ==
After 97% of Capitol stock was acquired by the British company EMI in 1955, Dexter was placed in charge of screening that company's releases to determine if they were suitable for American release. He rejected most, and Capitol gave little promotional support to those records from EMI that were released. When the Beatles were initially signed to EMI's Parlophone label and began to enjoy considerable success in Britain, Dexter turned down their initial four single releases, believing the group was not suitable for American audiences. Dexter had a change of heart while visiting England in 1963, seeing the effects of Beatlemania on the UK music scene and industry, and encouraged Capitol to license The Beatles' recordings for US release, once they were released from Swan Records. Capitol eventually released "I Want To Hold Your Hand", their fifth UK single, in the U.S. in December, 1963.

In addition, Dexter rejected the following British EMI artists on behalf of Capitol in 1963 and 1964: Parlophone's the Hollies and Billy J. Kramer and the Dakotas, His Master's Voice's the Swinging Blue Jeans and Manfred Mann, and Columbia's Gerry and the Pacemakers, the Animals, the Yardbirds, Herman's Hermits and the Dave Clark Five, all of whom had some U.S. success on other labels beginning in 1964. In a memo dated Feb. 20, 1964 to Capitol Records head Alan W. Livingston, Dexter viewed most of these artists as unsuccessful, praising only Freddie and the Dreamers, whom he signed to Capitol.

Dexter oversaw the Beatles' American releases in 1964 and 1965, compiling the albums according to his belief in the different needs of the American market, where albums tended to contain fewer songs than their UK counterparts, and where hit singles were routinely included on albums rather than being considered separate as was then common in the UK. Dexter also remastered the recordings, sometimes adding reverb and altering the stereo picture. The resulting albums achieved great success and were much-loved by American fans, but have often been criticized over the years; critic Dave Marsh, for example, referred to Dexter's treatment of the recordings as "genuine stupidity". Beatles producer George Martin and the Beatles themselves were also very critical of Dexter's alterations to their material, and for all territories, including America, the Beatles reissues of the 1980s forward almost exclusively used only the original UK packaging and mixes. The Dexter-altered versions of the Beatles canon were eventually released on CD in the form of the box sets The Capitol Albums, Volume 1 (2004) and The Capitol Albums, Volume 2 (2006).

== Later career ==
Dexter's decisions and appraisals regarding the potential success of British popular music in the U.S. led to problems between Capitol and EMI beginning in late 1964, which were exacerbated by his refusal to accede to the Beatles' requests for identical releases in the U.S. and U.K. Eventually, these factors led to his demotion in 1966 to, as he called it, "a job with no title", and he ultimately left Capitol in 1974, after more than thirty years with the company. He subsequently wrote for Billboard magazine; in the December 20, 1980, issue, which featured tributes to John Lennon following his 1980 murder, Dexter infamously wrote an article highly critical of Lennon. His piece, "Nobody's Perfect", resulted in threats of sponsor boycotts, prompting the magazine to publish an apology "to those who were offended" in the following week's issue.

In 1975 he produced a radio show entitled Here's to Veterans for the Veterans Administration. While with Billboard, he published an autobiography, entitled Playback, his previous books included Jazz Cavalcade (1946) and The Jazz Story, From the '90s to the '60s (1964). He was a tireless supporter of younger musicians and wrote the liner notes for the Fullerton College Jazz Band's 1983 Down Beat award winning LP Time Tripping released on the Discovery/Trend Records AM-PM label by his longtime friend Albert Marx.

== Tributes ==
Count Basie recorded "Diggin' For Dex" in Dexter's honor, while Jay McShann did likewise with "Dexter's Blues".

== Death ==
Dexter died in his sleep in his home in Sherman Oaks, California on April 19, 1990, at age 74. He had suffered a stroke a few years earlier.
