= Duophonic =

Type of audio signal processing

Duophonic sound was a trade name for a type of audio signal processing used by Capitol Records on certain releases and re-releases of monaural recordings issued during the 1960s and 1970s.

== Origin ==
In the Duophonic process, mono recordings were reprocessed into a type of artificial stereo. Generically, the sound is commonly known as fake stereo or mock stereo. Capitol Studios' staff engineer John Palladino created the process over a two-year period of research and experimentation. It was introduced in May 1961. Capitol trademarked Duophonic in 1963, and was said to have applied for a patent on the process.

== Process ==
The Duophonic sound process split the mono signal into two channels, then delayed one channel's signal by means of delay lines and other circuits. It desynchronized the two channels by fractions of a second, cut the bass frequencies in one channel with a high-pass filter, and cut the treble frequencies in the other channel with a low-pass filter. In some cases, the effect was enhanced with reverberation. The result was an artificial stereo effect, said to give listeners the spatial fullness of stereo but not the effect of hearing specific instruments or sounds from one speaker or the other.

== Reception ==
By one estimate, Duophonic greatly improved recordings made before there was stereo recording, and "many of these are well worthy of being transformed into two-channel records that can exploit stereo reproducers." The process was lauded as "revitalizing" old favorites and providing a "sumptuousness their originals never had," giving a "dimensional two-speaker effect," though not stereo.

Love for the Duophonic process was not, however, universal. One commentator characterized the process as putting "boom in one channel and scratch in the other," contending that it sounds louder than the mono original.

== Market drive ==
Capitol employed the Duophonic technique in order to increase its inventory of stereo LPs, as well as to boost the sales of its mono LP catalog in the face of the growing popularity of stereo recordings. With Duophonic product, Capitol also sought to meet retailer demand for more stereo content (and help to promote the sale of stereo receivers and turntables). For nearly ten years Capitol used the banner "DUOPHONIC – For Stereo Phonographs Only" to differentiate the Duophonic LPs from its true stereo LPs.

Capitol began using the process in 1961 and continued its practice into the 1970s. It was used for some of the biggest Capitol releases, including albums by The Beach Boys and Frank Sinatra. Over the years, however, some Duophonic tapes were confused with true stereo recordings in Capitol Records' vaults, and were reissued on CD throughout the 1980s and 1990s. Capitol intentionally reissued some of the Beatles' Duophonic mixes on The Capitol Albums, Volume 1 and The Capitol Albums, Volume 2, in 2004 and 2006, respectively.

Duophonic LPs sold for fifty cents more than their mono counterparts, so the standard $3.98 mono sale price was raised to $4.49. True stereo records were usually priced $1.00 higher than their mono versions. In 1967, labels raised the mono record price by a dollar to match the stereo price, and the following year, discontinued mono releases. Over the next two decades "fake stereo was the only way to buy many evergreens," such as The Rolling Stones, Patsy Cline, Miles Davis, and Frank Sinatra.

On rare occasions some artists deliberately used fake stereo to achieve an intended artistic effect. In such situations artificial stereo was used when certain elements of a mono mix could not be reproduced for a stereo remix. An example is the Beatles' stereo mix of the song "I Am the Walrus", where the first portion of the piece is true stereo, but switches to artificial stereo at approximately the two-minute mark for the remainder of the song; this is because the live radio feeds from a BBC broadcast of King Lear were mixed directly into the mono mix of the song, and could not (with the pre-digital technology of that time) be extricated and discreetly superimposed onto the stereo mix. Later remixes of the song, such as that included in the Love soundtrack album, are in true stereo for the complete song. Similarly, the mono mix of the song "Only a Northern Song" featured sound effects that were made during the mixing process and could only with difficulty be remade for a stereo remix, so the song was released in fake stereo on the 1969 album Yellow Submarine. However, the 1999 album Yellow Submarine Songtrack features a full stereo remix of the song, and the 2009 remaster of the original 1969 album restores the song to its original mono mix because enhanced stereo had fallen out of favor.

== Other processes ==
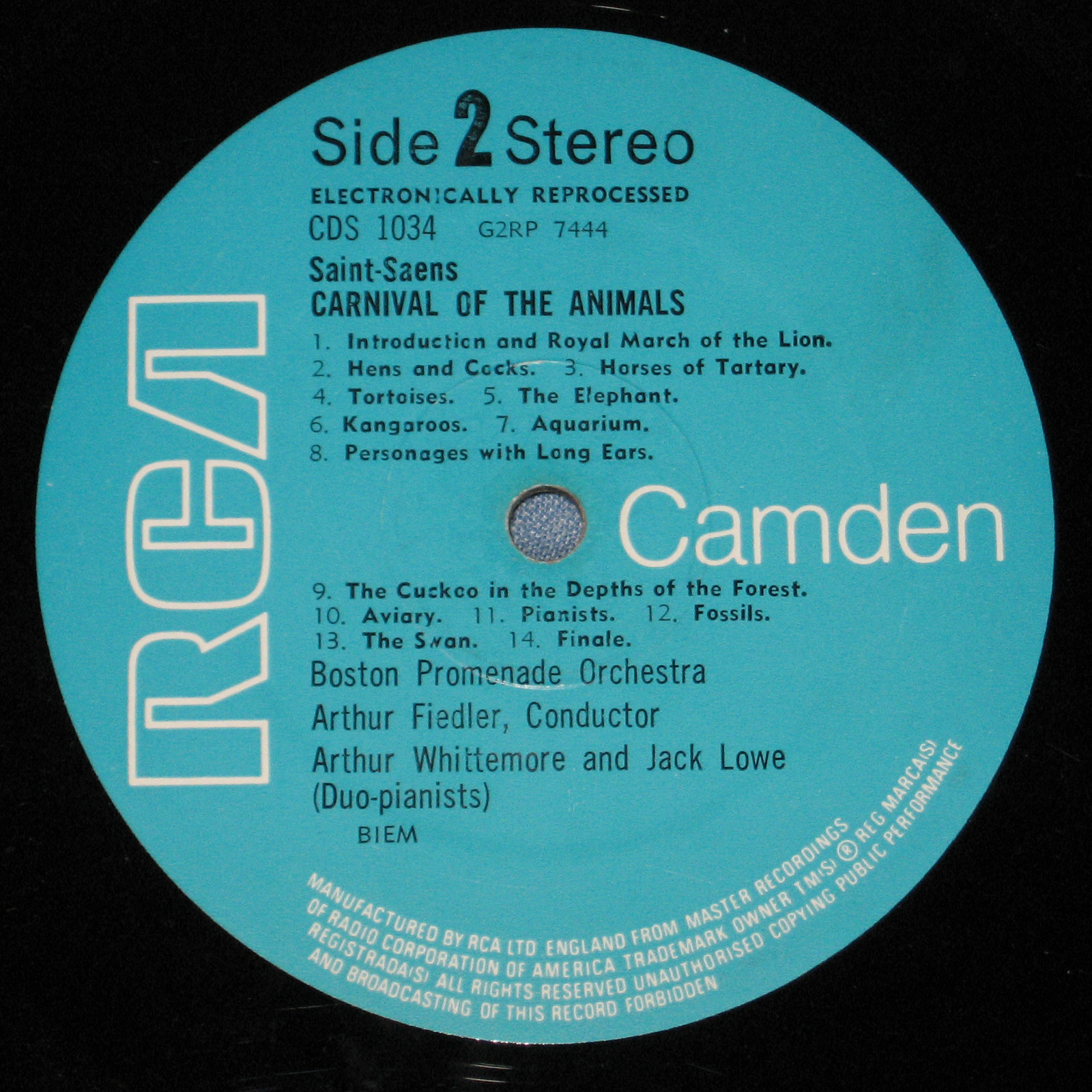
RCA "stereo" reissue bearing the "electronically reprocessed" wording.

Other record companies used similar processing of monophonic material to create a stereo effect, but referred to it by other terms, such as RCA Records' "electronically reprocessed stereo" and Columbia Records' "Electronically Re-channeled for Stereo". As with Capitol, Columbia's artificial stereo issues included albums by major artists, such as Miles Davis ('Round About Midnight, CL 949 mono, reissued in stereo as PC 8649) and Dave Brubeck (Jazz Goes to College, CL 566 mono, reissued in stereo as CS 8631). Pickwick Records' version was labeled "Design Compatible Fidelity," said to be able to be played on mono or stereo phonographs without damage.

== Original Capitol releases ==
At the rollout, Capitol released fourteen of its top-selling mono albums in the Duophonic format:

- Le Sacre Du Sauvage – Les Baxter (DT 288)
- The Voices of Walter Schumann (DT 297)
- Lonesome Echo – Jackie Gleason (DW 627)
- Four Freshmen and 5 Trombones (DT 683)
- Favorite Instrumentals of the Islands – Wesley Edwards (DT 715)
- Velvet Carpet – The George Shearing Quintet (DT 720)
- Your Guy Lombardo Medley (DT 739)
- Pal Joey Original Soundtrack (DW 912)
- Hits of Les and Mary – Les Paul & Mary Ford (DT 1476)
- The Hits of Benny Goodman (DT 1514)
- German Beer-Drinking Music – various artists (DT 10008)
- Haydn: The Salomon Symphonies – Sir Thomas Beecham (DCGR-7127)
- Songs of Stephen Foster – The Roger Wagner Chorale (DP-8267)
- Echoes of Spain – Carmen Dragon, Hollywood Symphony Orchestra (DP-8275)

== See also ==
- Precedence effect
