= The Number Ones =

Greatest hits album by the Beatles
- Released: 13 May 1983
- Studio: Abbey Road Studios; Trident Studios; Apple Studios
- Genre: Rock; pop
- Label: Parlophone
- Producer: George Martin
- Compiler: EMI Australia

The Beatles Australian chronology
The Beatles Box (1980)	The Number Ones (1983)	Past Masters (1988)

Bonus EP
- The sleeve of the bonus EP that came with the original LP release

The Number Ones is a compilation album of hits by The Beatles released in 1983 by EMI on the Parlophone Records label in Australia. It is a localised version of the 1982 compilation album 20 Greatest Hits.

== Background ==
To reflect Australia's differing tastes, EMI Australia issued its own version of 20 Greatest Hits. As The Beatles had 23 number ones in Australia, the title was aptly changed to The Number Ones. However, not all tracks would fit into a standard vinyl LP, so three tracks ("Love Me Do", "I Feel Fine" and "Rock and Roll Music") were added as a bonus EP that came with the original album.

The Australian album is unique as it is the only album release of the original 1963 stereo mix of "I Want To Hold Your Hand". This was only previously available on a 1976 Australian reissue of the original single. This stereo mix of the song has never been officially released on compact disc or any other digital format.

== Release ==
The album was released May 1983 on both LP and cassette. It spent one week at the top of the Australian album charts in 1983.

Due to timing problems, EMI included a three-track bonus EP (A-980) with the 20-track LP. Without the same length limitations, the cassette version contains all 23 tracks.

The Number Ones stayed in print in Australia until 1991. It was deleted (with other Australian only compilations) when EMI Australia ceased vinyl production. It was never released on compact disc.

== Track listing ==
=== LP Version ===
All tracks are written by Lennon–McCartney, except where noted.

Side one
No.	Title	Length
1.	"I Want to Hold Your Hand" (original 1963 stereo mix)	2:24
2.	"I Saw Her Standing There"	2:55
3.	"Can't Buy Me Love"	2:11
4.	"A Hard Day's Night"	2:33
5.	"I Should Have Known Better"	2:44
6.	"Ticket to Ride"	3:10
7.	"Help!"	2:18
8.	"We Can Work It Out"	2:15
9.	"Nowhere Man"	2:44
10.	"Yellow Submarine"	2:38
11.	"Penny Lane"	3:00

Side two
No.	Title	Writer(s)	Length
1.	"All You Need Is Love"		3:47
2.	"Hello, Goodbye"		3:27
3.	"Lady Madonna"		2:16
4.	"Hey Jude"		7:04
5.	"Ob-La-Di, Ob-La-Da"		3:07
6.	"Get Back"		3:12
7.	"The Ballad of John and Yoko"		2:59
8.	"Something"	Harrison	3:01
9.	"Let It Be"		3:50

Bonus EP side one
No.	Title	Length
1.	"Love Me Do"	2:20

Bonus EP side two
No.	Title	Writer(s)	Length
1.	"I Feel Fine"		2:18
2.	"Rock and Roll Music"	Berry	2:30

=== Cassette version ===
All tracks are written by Lennon–McCartney, except where noted.

Side one
No.	Title	Writer(s)	Length
1.	"I Want to Hold Your Hand" (original 1963 stereo mix)		2:24
2.	"Love Me Do"		2:20
3.	"I Saw Her Standing There"		2:55
4.	"Can't Buy Me Love"		2:11
5.	"A Hard Day's Night"		2:33
6.	"I Should Have Known Better"		2:44
7.	"I Feel Fine"		2:18
8.	"Rock and Roll Music"	Berry	2:30
9.	"Ticket to Ride"		3:10
10.	"Help!"		2:18
11.	"We Can Work It Out"		2:15
12.	"Nowhere Man"		2:44
13.	"Yellow Submarine"		2:38
14.	"Penny Lane"		3:00

Side two
No.	Title	Writer(s)	Length
1.	"All You Need Is Love"		3:47
2.	"Hello, Goodbye"		3:27
3.	"Lady Madonna"		2:16
4.	"Hey Jude"		7:04
5.	"Ob-La-Di, Ob-La-Da"		3:07
6.	"Get Back"		3:12
7.	"The Ballad of John and Yoko"		2:59
8.	"Something"	Harrison	3:01
9.	"Let It Be"		3:50

== Chart positions ==
Chart (1983)	Peak position
Australian (Kent Music Report)	1

== See also ==
- 20 Greatest Hits
- Outline of the Beatles
- The Beatles timeline
