= Hey Jude (Beatles album) =

Compilation album by the Beatles
- Released: 26 February 1970
- Recorded: 1964–1969
- Studios: EMI, Apple and Trident, London; Pathé Marconi, Paris
- Genre: Rock
- Length: 33:17
- Label: Apple
- Producer: George Martin

The Beatles North American chronology
Abbey Road (1969)	Hey Jude (1970)	Let It Be (1970)

Professional ratings
Review scores
Source	Rating
AllMusic	3/5 stars
Christgau's Record Guide	A
The Encyclopedia of Popular Music	3/5 stars
The Rolling Stone Record Guide	4/5 stars

Hey Jude (original title: The Beatles Again) is a 1970 collection of non-album singles and B-sides by the Beatles. It is named after the album's biggest hit and the Beatles' longest-running No. 1 single, "Hey Jude", itself the seventh track of the compilation.

Originally released in the United States and various other markets, but not in the United Kingdom, it includes "I Should Have Known Better" and "Can't Buy Me Love", two singles released by Capitol Records whose only previous American album appearance had been on the A Hard Day's Night soundtrack album, which had been released by United Artists Records. The album also features both sides of the single "Paperback Writer" and "Rain", and three other non-album singles and B-sides that would later make their album debut on the 1967–1970 compilation in countries outside North America. The album was issued on CD for the first time in 2014, as an individual release and in a box set titled The U.S. Albums.

== Background ==
In 1969, Allen Klein negotiated a more lucrative contract for the Beatles with Capitol Records, which required one compilation album per year. After Klein convinced the band to turn their current Get Back project into a feature film, the accompanying soundtrack album was postponed until 1970. Since the distribution rights of the proposed Get Back LP and film belonged to United Artists, Capitol decided to release their own new Beatles album. In November 1969, Klein asked his associate at ABKCO Records, Allan Steckler, to assemble a new Beatles compilation for the U.S. market.

Steckler chose ten songs that had not yet appeared on a Capitol album in the U.S. and which spanned the group's career. He requested a stereo master tape from EMI, who had to remix four of the songs for stereo, as they had never appeared on a UK album. Steckler arranged the running order, which was, with the exception of "Don't Let Me Down", programmed chronologically.

While "Can't Buy Me Love" and "I Should Have Known Better" had appeared in the film A Hard Day's Night and on the subsequent United Artists soundtrack LP, they had only previously been issued by Capitol on singles. The former was released as an A-side on 16 March 1964 and the latter as the B-side to "A Hard Day's Night" on 13 July 1964.

Hey Jude was not intended to be a definitive collection of rarities. Other songs that had not appeared on a Capitol LP but were passed over for this compilation included "Misery", "There's a Place" (both issued by Vee-Jay Records on their Introducing... the Beatles album), "From Me to You", "Sie Liebt Dich" (a German-language version of "She Loves You"), "A Hard Day's Night" (issued by United Artists on their soundtrack album), "I'm Down" (the B-side of "Help!") and "The Inner Light" (the B-side of "Lady Madonna").

The 21 January 1970 issue of Rolling Stone announced that Get Back had been delayed again, to coincide with the film release, and that a compilation album, titled The Beatles Again, would be issued shortly. Apple labels were printed with this title and the catalog number SO-385, denoting a stereo release priced at $6.98. However, after retailers complained about the price, given that the album only contained previously released songs, Capitol reduced it to $5.98 and changed the catalog number to SW-385.

Steckler and Apple had become disappointed with Capitol's release schedules and were determined to promote the new album themselves. Steckler also took the tapes to Sam Feldman at Bell Sound Studios for mastering, rather than delivering them to Capitol, as he would do for several releases thereafter.

== Artwork and title ==
The front and back cover pictures were taken by Ethan Russell and Monte Fresco at the last-ever Beatles photo session, on 22 August 1969, at John Lennon's home, Tittenhurst Park. In 2007, Neil Aspinall claimed that the back cover photo was intended for the front cover, and vice versa, but that Klein had reversed them in error. However, at least three prototype cover designs are known to exist, with only the first design displaying the rear photo on the front. The album's artwork was designed by John Kosh.

Shortly before the record was released, the title was changed to Hey Jude, the album's biggest hit. The change occurred after the record labels were printed, and some copies of the LP were sold with labels that bore the original title of The Beatles Again. Neither the front nor the back of the album jacket displayed the record's title, but most copies were sold in a jacket whose spine read Hey Jude. The edition of the album with the Beatles Again labels bore catalogue number SO-385 on the labels but not on the jacket. Later pressings include both the Hey Jude title and SW-385 on the labels. Some copies of the album displayed a sticker on the cover bearing the new title.

== Release ==
Hey Jude was released in the U.S. on 26 February 1970. It charted for 33 weeks on the Billboard 200, peaking at No. 2, and by June had sold 3.3 million copies.

The compilation was released in many countries, including the United States, Canada, Australia, Spain, Germany, France, Greece, Japan, Mexico and most of South America. It was also available to other countries as an "export" from Britain (Parlophone/Apple CPCS-106) but was not at first issued in Britain, although it was a popular import to the UK. The first issue in New Zealand was on the gloss black Apple label with the catalogue number CPCS-106. The matrix numbers were identical to those on the UK "export" issue. Because of its popularity worldwide, EMI issued Hey Jude in Britain on the Parlophone label on 11 May 1979 (catalogue number PCS 7184).

Until the release of 1967–1970 in 1973, Hey Jude was the only way to own the extremely popular "Hey Jude" single on LP or in a stereo mix. The songs "Rain", "Lady Madonna" and "Revolution" were also first mixed for stereo specifically for this album. Prior to the release of the "Get Back" single in the spring of 1969, all Beatles singles were issued in mono in the US.

Several other countries adopted the original The Beatles Again title. Of these, the Spanish release omitted "The Ballad of John and Yoko", due to that song having been deemed offensive. (In addition to making repeated mention of Christ and crucifixion, the lyrics contain the line "Gibraltar near Spain" at a time when Spain's Franco administration was contesting the ownership of Gibraltar with the UK.)

On the reel-to-reel and cassette tape releases, sides one and two are reversed. Although it is clear on the vinyl version that "Hey Jude" opens side two, when compiling this issue for audio tape, some compilers (at Capitol and Ampex) thought to make the change, which resulted in "Hey Jude" leading off the album. This was done because side two was the longer side, and it was the practice in some tape formats to lead the album with the longer side to avoid a large gap in the "middle" of the tape. The four-track tape cartridge, prepared by Ampex along with the reel-to-reel tape, has the songs in the original, chronological order. (The eight-track tape was treated to the usual re-ordering that eight-tracks received.)

The compact disc era saw the standardization of the Beatles' discographies worldwide, and for many years the Hey Jude compilation was not available in the CD format. Although no longer in print on LP, the Hey Jude album was still available on cassette tape until the 1990s.

In January 2014, Hey Jude was issued on CD, both in the American Beatles album compilation box set The U.S. Albums and separately.

== Track listing ==
All tracks written by Lennon–McCartney, except where noted.

Side one
No.	Title	Lead vocals	Length
1.	"Can't Buy Me Love" (single, 1964; later included on A Hard Day's Night, 1964)	McCartney	2:19
2.	"I Should Have Known Better" (from A Hard Day's Night, 1964; B-side, 1964)	Lennon	2:44
3.	"Paperback Writer" (non-album single, 1966)	McCartney	2:19
4.	"Rain" (B-side, 1966)	Lennon	3:02
5.	"Lady Madonna" (non-album single, 1968)	McCartney	2:19
6.	"Revolution" (B-side, 1968)	Lennon	3:25
Total length:			16:08

Side two
No.	Title	Lead vocals	Length
1.	"Hey Jude" (non-album single, 1968)	McCartney	7:10
2.	"Old Brown Shoe" (George Harrison; B-side, 1969)	Harrison	3:21
3.	"Don't Let Me Down" (B-side, 1969)	Lennon	3:36
4.	"The Ballad of John and Yoko" (non-album single, 1969)	Lennon	3:02
Total length:			17:09

== Personnel ==
The Beatles

- John Lennon – lead vocals, backing vocals, rhythm guitar, lead guitar, harmonica, tambourine, percussion
- Paul McCartney – lead vocals, backing vocals, bass guitar, lead guitar, piano, Hammond organ, drums, percussion
- George Harrison – lead vocals, backing vocals, lead guitar, rhythm guitar, bass guitar, Hammond organ, percussion
- Ringo Starr – backing vocals, drums, percussion

Additional musicians

Credits adapted from The Beatles Recording Sessions by Mark Lewisohn:

- Ronnie Scott – tenor saxophone (5)
- Bill Povey – tenor saxophone (5)
- Harry Klein – baritone saxophone (5)
- Bill Jackman – baritone saxophone (5)
- Nicky Hopkins – electric piano (6)
- Billy Preston – electric piano (9)

Technical

- George Martin – producer
- Ethan Russell – photography
- Monte Fresco – photography
- John Kosh – design

== Charts ==
Weekly chart performance
Chart (1970)	Peak
Australian Albums (Kent Music Report)	1
Canada Top Albums/CDs (RPM)	2
Finnish Albums (Suomen virallinen lista)	13
Italian Albums (Musica e dischi)	3
US Billboard Top LPs	2

== Certifications ==
Certifications and sales
Region	Certification	Certified units/sales
Canada (Music Canada)	4× Platinum	400,000^{^}
Italy (FIMI) sales since 2009	Gold	25,000^{‡}
United States (RIAA)	3× Platinum	3,000,000^{^}
^{^} Shipments figures based on certification alone.^{‡} Sales+streaming figures based on certification alone.

== See also ==
- Outline of the Beatles
- The Beatles timeline

== Bibliography ==
- Spizer, Bruce (2020). The Beatles Finally Let It Be. New York: Imagine Wonder. ISBN 978-1-63761-001-5.
- Wiener, Allen J. (1994). The Beatles: The Ultimate Recording Guide (Third revised ed.). Holbrook, Massachusetts: Bob Adams, Inc. ISBN 1-55850-414-1.
