= Get Back =

1969 single by the Beatles with Billy Preston

- Picture sleeve for 1989 UK reissue

Single by the Beatles with Billy Preston

from the album Let It Be
- B-side: "Don't Let Me Down"
- Released: 11 April 1969
- Recorded: 27–28 January 1969
- Studio: Apple, London
- Genre: Rock and roll; blues; rock
- Length: 3:09 (album version); 3:13 (single version)
- Label: Apple
- Songwriter: Lennon–McCartney
- Producers: Glyn Johns and George Martin (single version); Phil Spector (album version)

The Beatles singles chronology
"Hey Jude" (1968)	"Get Back" (1969)	"The Ballad of John and Yoko" (1969)

Billy Preston singles chronology
"Hey Brother" (1968)	"Get Back" (1969)	"That's the Way God Planned It" (1969)

Audio sample
- "Get Back": file; help

"Get Back" is a song recorded by the English rock band the Beatles with Billy Preston, written by Paul McCartney, and credited to the Lennon–McCartney partnership. It was originally released as a single on 11 April 1969 and credited to "The Beatles with Billy Preston", and is one of the few examples of John Lennon featuring prominently as lead guitarist. The album version contains a different mix that features a studio chat between Lennon and McCartney for 20 seconds at the start before the song begins, also omitting the coda featured in the single version, and with a final dialogue taken from the Beatles' rooftop concert. This version became the closing track of Let It Be (1970), which was released just after the group split up. The single version was later issued on the compilation albums 1967–1970, 20 Greatest Hits, Past Masters, and 1.

The single reached number one in the United Kingdom, the United States, Ireland, Canada, New Zealand, the Netherlands, Australia, France, West Germany, Mexico, Norway, Switzerland, Austria, and Belgium. It was the Beatles' only single that credited another artist at their request. "Get Back" was the Beatles' first single release in true stereo in the US. In the UK, the Beatles' singles remained monaural until the following release, "The Ballad of John and Yoko". It was also the only Beatles single to debut on the UK singles chart at number one.

== Composition ==
=== Musical development ===
"Get Back" is unusual in the Beatles' canon in that almost every moment of the song's evolution has been documented, from its beginning as an offhand riff to its final mixing in several versions. This is covered in bootleg recordings, books, the 1970 documentary Let It Be, and the 2021 Peter Jackson–directed documentary The Beatles: Get Back.

The song's melody grew out of some unstructured jamming on 7 January 1969 during rehearsal sessions on the sound stage at Twickenham Studios. After working out the rhythm and harmony of the primary riff on his Höfner bass, McCartney introduced some of the lyrics, reworking "Get back to the place you should be" from George Harrison's "Sour Milk Sea" into "Get back to where you once belonged". McCartney had played bass on Jackie Lomax's recording of "Sour Milk Sea" a few months earlier. On 9 January, McCartney brought a more developed version of "Get Back" to the group, with the "Sweet Loretta" verse close to its finished version. For the press release to promote the "Get Back" single, McCartney wrote, "We were sitting in the studio, and we made it up out of thin air ... we started to write words there and then ... when we finished it, we recorded it at Apple Studios and made it into a song to roller-coast by."

At the beginning of the Let It Be version of the song, Lennon can be heard jokingly saying "Sweet Loretta Fart (often misheard as "fat", due to Lennon's pronunciation), she thought she was a cleaner, but she was a frying pan." The album version of the song also ends with Lennon famously quipping, "I'd like to say thank you on behalf of the group and ourselves, and I hope we passed the audition." (He had said that at the end of their 30 January 1969 rooftop concert on the roof of Apple Studios, but Phil Spector edited it into the studio version of "Get Back" that was released on the Let It Be album.)

In an interview in Playboy magazine in 1980, Lennon described "Get Back" as "... a better version of 'Lady Madonna'. You know, a potboiler rewrite". Lennon also said that "there's some underlying thing about Yoko in there", saying that McCartney looked at Yoko Ono in the studio every time he sang "Get back to where you once belonged."

=== Early protest lyrics ===
When McCartney introduced the song to the group during the Twickenham rehearsals, the lyrics were mostly incomplete except for the "Get Back" chorus. McCartney improvised various temporary lyrics leading to what has become known in Beatles' folklore as the "No Pakistanis" version. This version parodied the anti-immigrant views of Enoch Powell, a Member of Parliament (MP) whose racially charged speeches, particularly the Rivers of Blood speech, had recently gained much media attention. The lyrics addressed attitudes toward immigrants in the United States and the United Kingdom: "... don't need no Puerto Ricans living in the USA"; and "don't dig no Pakistanis taking all the people's jobs." Later during the same session, the subject of immigration came up again in an improvised jam that has become known as "Commonwealth". The lyrics included a line, "You'd better get back to your Commonwealth homes".

== Recordings and post-production work ==
Billy Preston, an old friend of the Beatles, was in England for some television appearances. He joined the Beatles on keyboards on 22 January. The group, with Preston playing Fender Rhodes electric piano, recorded about ten takes on 23 January. They made a concerted effort to perfect "Get Back" on 27 January, recording about 14 takes. By this time, the song had the addition of a false ending and reprise coda. After numerous takes, the band jammed some old numbers and then returned to "Get Back" one last time in an attempt to record the master take. This performance (Take 11) was considered to be the best yet: it was musically tight and punchy without mistakes, though the song finishes without the restart. On the session tape, George Harrison comments, "[W]e missed that end"; this is the version heard on the Let It Be... Naked album. On 28 January the group attempted to recapture the previous day's performance and recorded several new takes, each including the coda. While these takes were good, they did not quite achieve the quality of the best take from the previous day. The line-up for the released versions of "Get Back" was Paul McCartney, lead vocal and bass; John Lennon, lead guitar and backing vocal; George Harrison, rhythm guitar; Ringo Starr, drums; and Billy Preston, electric piano. Harrison, the usual lead guitarist, had temporarily quit the group on 10 January, so Lennon worked out the lead guitar part and played it on the recordings.

On 4 April, producer George Martin and engineer Jeff Jarratt created a mono mix in EMI's Room 4. McCartney was unhappy with the mix, and on 7 April, he and Glyn Johns worked at Olympic Studios to produce new remixes for the single release. They made an edited version using the best take of the main part of the song (Take 11) from 27 January and the 'best coda' ending from 28 January. The edit is so precise that it appears to be a continuous take, achieving the ending the Beatles had desired all along. This was a divergence from the concept of a straight live performance without studio trickery, but a relatively minor one, and avoids the somewhat abrupt ending of the version used on the Let It Be... Naked album.

The Beatles performed "Get Back" (along with other songs from the album) as part of their rooftop performance, which took place on the roof of Apple Studios in Savile Row, London, on 30 January 1969, an edited version of which was included in the Let It Be film. "Get Back" was performed in full three times. During the third, which marked the end of the rooftop performance, the Beatles were interrupted by the police, who had received complaints from office workers nearby. After the police spoke to Mal Evans, he turned off Lennon and Harrison's amplifiers only for Harrison to switch them back on, insisting that they finish the song. McCartney said, "You've been playing on the roofs again, and that's no good, and you know your Mummy doesn't like that ... she gets angry ... she's gonna have you arrested! Get back!" The third rooftop performance of "Get Back" is available on Anthology 3: the last song of the Beatles' final live performance.

At the end of the last rooftop performance of "Get Back", the audience applauds, and McCartney says, "Thanks, Mo", in reply to Maureen Starkey's cheering. Lennon adds: "I'd like to say thank you on behalf of the group and ourselves and I hope we've passed the audition". Spector used some of the talk preceding the master take of 27 January and edited on these comments to make the album version sound different from the single.

== Releases ==
=== Single version ===
On 11 April 1969, Apple Records released "Get Back" as a single in the UK, paired with "Don't Let Me Down" on the B-side. The single began its 17-week stay in the charts on 23 April at No. 1, a position it held for six weeks. It was the first Beatles single to enter the official UK singles chart at the top. In the US, "Get Back" began its first of 12 weeks on the Billboard Hot 100 chart the week ending 10 May. Two weeks after the song's chart debut, it hit No. 1, where it stayed for five weeks. "Get Back" became the band's 17th No. 1 song on Billboard, matching Elvis Presley's previous record of 17 number ones.

In both the UK and US, the single was released by Apple, although EMI retained the rights to the song as part of their contract. It was the only Beatles single to include an accompanying artist's name, crediting "Get Back/Don't Let Me Down" to "The Beatles with Billy Preston". Neither Apple nor Capitol Records created a picture sleeve for the single—it was modestly packaged in a black sleeve with a cursive-style font simply stating "The Beatles on Apple". Apple launched a print ad campaign for the song concurrent with its release showing a photo of the band with the slogan The Beatles as Nature Intended, indicating that the sound of "Get Back" harked to the group's earlier days.

The single version of the song contains a chamber reverb effect throughout and a coda after a false ending, with the lyrics "Get back Loretta / Your mommy's waiting for you / Wearing her high-heel shoes / And her low-neck sweater / Get back home, Loretta." This does not appear on the album version; the single version's first LP appearance would come three years later on the 1967–1970 compilation. This version also appeared in the albums 20 Greatest Hits, Past Masters and 1. It was also included in the original line-up of the proposed Get Back album, which was scheduled to be released in the fall of 1969.

The single was also released in the experimental PocketDisc format by Americom in conjunction with Apple and Capitol in the late 1960s.

=== Let It Be version (1970) ===
When Phil Spector came to remix "Get Back", he wanted to make it seem different from the version released as the single, though both versions were essentially the same take. The unreleased Get Back albums included elements of studio chatter to add to the live feel of the recordings. In this spirit, Spector included part of the studio chatter recorded immediately before a take recorded on 27 January, slightly crossfaded it onto the beginning of the master take (also recorded on 27 January), and omitted the coda recorded on 28 January, instead adding McCartney and Lennon's remarks after the close of the rooftop performance. This created the impression that the single and album versions are different takes. The single's reverb effect was also omitted from this remix.

=== Naked version (2003) ===
In 2003, "Get Back" was re-released on the Let It Be... Naked album, remixed by independent producers with the sanction of surviving Beatles Paul McCartney and Ringo Starr, with John Lennon's and George Harrison's widows. The "Naked" version of "Get Back" is a remix of the take recorded on 27 January 1969 used for both the single and album versions, without the coda recorded the following day or the framing dialogue from the studio and rooftop concert added to the album version. The single's reverb effect was also omitted from this remix, and the song fades immediately before the final "whoo". Apple also prepared a specially-created music video of the Let It Be ... Naked release of the song to promote that album in 2003. This video is edited together using stock footage of the band, along with Billy Preston, George Martin and others.

=== Love version (2006) ===
In 2006, a newly mixed version of "Get Back" produced by George Martin and his son Giles was included on the album Love. This version incorporates elements of "A Hard Day's Night" (the intro chord), "A Day in the Life" (the improvised orchestral crescendo), "The End" (Ringo Starr's drum solo, Paul McCartney's second guitar solo, and John Lennon's last guitar solo), and "Sgt. Pepper's Lonely Hearts Club Band (Reprise)" (Take 1's drum count-off intro). However, this piece has several edits, including an extended intro, and the second verse is removed completely.

=== The Beatles: Get Back versions ===
Universal Music released take 8 from the recording sessions to promote the 50th-anniversary edition of Let It Be and the 2021 Get Back documentary miniseries. This version has McCartney ad-libbing a different spoken word section over the bridge, beginning with "It's five o'clock ... your mother's got your tea on." As the band performed the song three times during their impromptu rooftop concert on 30 January 1969, all three of those versions also appear in the final episode of the mini-series, as the concert is shown in its entirety. Take 3 of the rooftop concert was released on Anthology 3 in 1996, while the first two were released in January 2022.

== McCartney live performances ==
McCartney performed "Get Back" on the Late Show with David Letterman on 15 July 2009. Letterman's show was taped in the Ed Sullivan Theater, the same theatre that hosted the Beatles' performances on The Ed Sullivan Show in 1964 and 1965. McCartney's performance was not on the stage, however. Instead, he performed atop the theatre's marquee overlooking Broadway. In the interview preceding the performance, Letterman asked McCartney if he had ever played on a marquee before. "I've done a roof", McCartney replied, referring to the Beatles' 1969 performance atop the Apple Corps building in London.

McCartney also performed the song as a kind of encore on Saturday Night Live on 11 December 2010. The performance was unusual for the show because McCartney had played the two standard songs that musical guests play, then had played a third song ("A Day in the Life"/"Give Peace a Chance"). At the normal conclusion of the show, when host Paul Rudd thanked the cast, McCartney retook the stage for "Get Back", the broadcast of which was partially cut off due to time constraints.

McCartney performed this live during his 1989/1990 World Tour, and it was released on both the full-length and highlight versions of the subsequent live album Tripping the Live Fantastic (1990). In 2009, a performance was included on the Good Evening New York City album.

In 2005, the song was part of his Super Bowl halftime show.

McCartney and the Foo Fighters performed the song at the 2021 Rock and Roll Hall of Fame Induction Ceremony.

== Personnel ==
- Paul McCartney – lead vocals, bass guitar
- John Lennon – harmony vocals, lead guitar
- George Harrison – rhythm guitar
- Ringo Starr – drums
- Billy Preston – Fender Rhodes electric piano

== Notable cover versions ==
- Rod Stewart, for the 1976 musical documentary All This and World War II. The song was released as a single and it reached No. 11 on the UK chart.
- Billy Preston, who played the Rhodes piano on the original Beatles recording, covered the song for the 1978 film Sgt. Pepper's Lonely Hearts Club Band and its soundtrack album. This version peaked at No. 86 on the Billboard Hot 100.
- Steve Wariner released his cover in 1995 as part of Come Together: America Salutes The Beatles album.

== Cultural references ==
- In the 2007 film Across the Universe, directed by Julie Taymor, most characters are named after lyrics in Beatles songs. A principal character is named Jojo, an African American who was played by Martin Luther McCoy.
- In February 2010, NBC used a cover of the song in commercials to promote Jay Leno's return to the 11:35 pm time slot for The Tonight Show with Jay Leno.
- Hirohiko Araki's 1987 manga JoJo's Bizarre Adventure may have used this song for inspiration for the main character of the first part, Jonathan Joestar, who starts as a loner but gains companions throughout his journey, as well as the nickname "JoJo" used throughout the series. The author is known for including many music references in his manga, including multiple references to The Beatles. At the end of the series's third part, Stardust Crusaders, Joseph Joestar is seen listening to the song on his Walkman. He also originally mentioned wanting to listen to it at the end of the second part, though later releases changed the scene to no longer mention the specific song, while "The Beatles" can still be seen on his walkman.

== Charts ==
=== Weekly charts ===
1969 weekly chart performance for "Get Back"
Chart (1969)	Peak position
Australia (Go-Set National Top 40)	1
Austria (Ö3 Austria Top 40)	1
Belgium (Ultratop 50 Flanders)	1
Canada Top Singles (RPM)	1
Finland (Suomen virallinen lista)	4
France (Centre d'Information et de Documentation du Disque)	1
Ireland (IRMA)	1
Italy (Musica e Dischi)	5
Netherlands (Single Top 100)	1
New Zealand (Listener)	1
Norway (VG-lista)	1
Sweden (Kvällstoppen)	1
Sweden (Tio i Topp)	6
Switzerland (Schweizer Hitparade)	1
UK Singles (Official Charts)	1
US Billboard Hot 100	1
US Cash Box Top 100	1
West German Media Control Singles Chart	1

1976 weekly chart performance for "Get Back"
Chart (1976)	Peak position
Ireland (IRMA)	8
UK Singles (Official Charts)	28

2021 weekly chart performance for "Get Back"
Chart (2021)	Peak position
US Hot Rock & Alternative Songs (Billboard)	23

=== Year-end charts ===
Year-end chart performance for "Get Back"
Chart (1969)	Rank
Canada	1
US Billboard Hot 100	25
US Cash Box Top 100	14

== Certifications and sales ==
Certifications and sales for "Get Back"
Region	Certification	Certified units/sales
Mexico	—	198,000
New Zealand (RMNZ)	Gold	15,000^{‡}
United Kingdom (BPI)	Gold	530,000
United States (RIAA)	2× Platinum	2,000,000^{^}
Summaries
Worldwide	—	4,500,000
^{^} Shipments figures based on certification alone.^{‡} Sales+streaming figures based on certification alone.
