= 1 (Beatles album) =

2000 greatest hits album by The Beatles

Greatest hits album by the Beatles
- Released: 13 November 2000
- Recorded: 11 September 1962 – 1 April 1970
- Studios: EMI, Apple, Olympic and Trident Studios, London; Pathé Marconi Studios, Paris
- Genres: Rock; pop
- Length: 78:39
- Labels: Apple; Parlophone; Capitol
- Producers: George Martin; Phil Spector
- Compilers: George Harrison; George Martin; Paul McCartney; Ringo Starr

The Beatles chronology
Yellow Submarine Songtrack (1999)	1 (2000)	Let It Be... Naked (2003)

1 is a greatest hits album of the British rock band the Beatles, originally released on 13 November 2000. The album features virtually every number-one single the band achieved in the United Kingdom or United States from 1962 to 1970. Issued on the 30th anniversary of the band's break-up, it was their first compilation album available on only one CD. 1 was a commercial success and topped charts worldwide. It has sold over 31 million copies. Since Nielsen SoundScan began tracking US album sales in January 1991, 1 is the fourth-best-selling album in the US, the best-selling album of the 2000s decade in the US, as well as the best-selling album of the decade worldwide.

1 was remastered and reissued in September 2011. It was remixed and reissued again in several different deluxe editions in November 2015, the most comprehensive of which is a three-disc set entitled 1+, which includes video discs of Beatles promotional films. As of June 2015, 1 was the sixth-best-selling album of the 21st century in the UK, having sold over 3.1 million copies.

1 was the last Beatles album to be released during George Harrison's lifetime, as he died on 29 November 2001, just over a year after 1 was released.

== Background ==
1 was compiled by producer George Martin and former band members Paul McCartney, George Harrison and Ringo Starr. The album contains the 27 Beatles songs that went to number one in the United Kingdom on the Record Retailer Top 50 chart or in the United States on the Billboard Hot 100 chart. Despite Harrison's "For You Blue" charting at number 1 on Billboard, along with the A-side "The Long and Winding Road", Capitol Records treated "For You Blue" as strictly a B-side and did not promote it as an A-side. "Day Tripper" was included on 1 since it charted at number 1 in the UK as a double A-side with "We Can Work It Out", while in the US, only "We Can Work It Out" was number 1. Two singles written by John Lennon and released in both the UK and US were omitted as they did not top either the Record Retailer chart or the Billboard Hot 100: "Please Please Me" and "Strawberry Fields Forever". The former was the Beatles' first UK number one single in all British charts except Record Retailer, reaching the top spot in the music magazines New Musical Express, Melody Maker and Disc. "Strawberry Fields Forever" was part of a double A-side single with "Penny Lane", which reached the top spot in Melody Maker and peaked at number 2 in the other UK charts, behind Engelbert Humperdinck's "Release Me"; while in the US, "Penny Lane" topped the charts, but "Strawberry Fields Forever" did not as it was listed separately. The compilation was created before the release of the single "Now and Then", which reached number 1 on the UK Singles Chart in 2023.

The album is a combination of both the US and UK versions of the 1982 compilation 20 Greatest Hits, with the addition of "Something" (which was left off 20 Greatest Hits because of time constraints). On 1, "Hey Jude" was included in its original full-length version (slightly over seven minutes), whereas the American version of 20 Greatest Hits contained a shortened version.

=== Remastering ===
Before 1, all 27 songs were mainly available on two remastered CD releases: firstly on the respective Beatles studio albums released in 1987 (as well as Past Masters, Volume One and Past Masters, Volume Two, released in 1988). The second remastering was made available on the CD versions for 1962–1966 and 1967–1970, released in 1993.

The songs on 1 were remastered specifically for the release in 2000. According to the liner notes of the album, the original analogue masters were "digitally remastered at 24 bits resolution, processed using Sonic Solutions NoNoise technology and mastered to 16-bit using Prism SNS Noise Shaping". The remastering was overseen by Peter Mew of Abbey Road Studios and took place there. In 2011, 1 was remastered and reissued on CD. In 2015 it was remastered again and remixed by Giles Martin; when Martin began to assist with fixing up the audio tracks for the 1+ video clips, he realised that his goal of making them "more immersive" should also apply to 1. For the remixing project, Martin commented: "The remasters went back to these final mix tapes and remastered them. They cleaned them up and then they EQ-ed them and released them. What we're doing is remixing. We're going not to the final mix, we're creating our own mixes." About his remixing approach, Martin said: "My approach was to be respectful of everything, I had sessions and sessions where I flipped between previously remastered stereos, the mono remasters, and the remixes we've done. I flip between everything and make sure I prefer what we've done."

=== Package ===
The package of 1 was intended to be simplistic and ambitious at the same time. Its cover was designed by Rick Ward, and consists of a pop art-style yellow number one on a red background. The emphasis on the 1 digit was used on many of the compilations of number-one hits by different artists that followed this album; for example, ELV1S by Elvis Presley and Number Ones by the Bee Gees. The album's back cover features the famous photos of the Beatles taken by Richard Avedon and copyrighted on 17 August 1967. The design exclusively uses variations of the Helvetica typeface.

1 was released worldwide on CD and cassette. The vinyl format was released only in the United Kingdom. The CD includes a 32-page booklet with a coloured page with international picture covers (a total of 163 covers are displayed on the whole booklet) and details (recording date, location, release date, chart stats) for each of the singles. It also includes on its first two pages a collage with 27 1s in different colours (all of them following the same art as the cover) with the sentence "27 No. 1 singles = 1" (which was used as a catch phrase for the promo ads for the album), and a foreword by George Martin.

The LP and cassette keep the main art of the CD version, but in a different form. The double vinyl record version was not released in the US, but the imported British edition was available. The vinyl version features a large full-colour fold-out poster showing 126 picture sleeves (37 fewer than on the CD), and reproductions of the four Richard Avedon photos. The Avedon portraits also appear on the inside of the gate-fold cover. The records have custom labels featuring the same graphics as the front cover and are packaged in custom inner sleeves. The deluxe packaging of the vinyl album, with its four portraits and poster, is reminiscent to that of their eponymous 1968 album. The cassette included a 20-page insert, including the collage, the George Martin commentary and paged Avedon's portraits on its inlay and the whole description for the tracks as a total of 36 covers on its inlay reverse.

== Reception ==
Professional ratings
Review scores
Source	Rating
AllMusic	5/5 stars
The Encyclopedia of Popular Music	4/5 stars
Entertainment Weekly	A−
Melody Maker	5/5 stars
NME	9/10
Q	4/5 stars

1 received universal acclaim. Stephen Thomas Erlewine of AllMusic gave the album five stars out of five. He stated that there is "no question that this is all great music", although to him "there's really no reason for anyone who owns all the records to get this too".

== Legacy ==
1 went on to inspire the release of a wave of compilation albums, in particular three other "number ones" albums: Elvis Presley's ELV1S (2002), Michael Jackson's Number Ones (2003) and the Bee Gees' Number Ones (2004). Other compilations inspired by 1 issued included Prince's The Very Best of Prince (2001), Pink Floyd's Echoes: The Best of Pink Floyd (2001), The Who's The Ultimate Collection (2002), the Rolling Stones' Forty Licks (2002) Nirvana's Nirvana (2002) Elton John's Greatest Hits 1970–2002 (2002), The Beach Boys' Sounds of Summer (2003), and Dean Martin's Dino: The Essential Dean Martin (2004).

== Sales and chart performance ==
The reception of 1 surpassed all critical and commercial expectations. It became the highest-selling CD of 2000 and, some time later, of the entire decade. This achievement made the Beatles the first and only artist to have the best-selling albums of two different decades: they also released the best-selling album of the 1960s, Sgt. Pepper's Lonely Hearts Club Band. No tracks from Sgt. Pepper appear on this album. With this album, the Beatles also achieved having an album hit the number 1 position in the US in four non-consecutive decades (1960s, 1970s, 1990s and 2000s).

In the United Kingdom, 1 became the Beatles' 15th number 1 album with sales of 319,126 copies (achieving record sales for only one week in 2000). On 18 December 2000, Ananova.com reported that the album has "become 2000's biggest-selling album—in only five weeks." 1 was the first album to stay at the top spot for nine weeks in almost ten years (the last being the Eurythmics's Greatest Hits), the best-selling album of 2000, and the sixth-best-selling album of the 2000s in the UK. In its eleventh week, 1 had sold a total of two million copies in the UK. It spent a total of 46 weeks inside the Top 75. In July 2013 it was certified 10× platinum by the BPI, for over 3 million copies sold in the UK. It is the 21st-best-selling album in the UK, according to an assessment by the Official Charts Company and the British Phonographic Industry that counted album sales in the UK from 28 July 1956 to the present day, and the second-best-selling Beatles album in that country (only beaten by Sgt. Pepper's Lonely Hearts Club Band, which is the UK's third-best-selling album). As of July 2016, the album has sold over 3,230,000 copies in the UK.

In the United States, the response was similar. 1 debuted at number one on the Billboard 200 during the week of 2 December 2000 with sales totaling over 595,500 copies. In its second week, sales increased to 662,000 but it was knocked off the top spot by Backstreet Boys' Black & Blue which sold 1.59 million units, therefore, 1 fell off to number two on its second week on chart. By doing so, the album became the sixth to debut at the top of the Billboard 200 and post a SoundScan increase in its second week and the first to do so after opening with a sum of more than half a million copies. The following week it stayed at number two selling 607,000 units. During the week of 23 December 2000, its fourth week on chart, 1 moved 671,000 copies and returned to the top of the Billboard 200. The next week, on 30 December 2000 it stayed at the top of the chart selling 823,500 copies. On 10 February 2001, after being the number one album for eight non-consecutive weeks, 1 fell off to number four on the Billboard 200 with 173,500 units sold, a 19.5% dip in sales; by the time this happened, the album had sold almost six million units. The album spent a total of eight weeks at number 1 and sold 1,258,667 copies during the week before Christmas of 2000. With this number, the Beatles achieved a new record: it was the seventh highest one-week sales in Soundscan history, the highest for an album not in its first week of sales, and the highest for an album comprising previously released music. The album spent 309 weeks inside the Billboard 200 and was the sixth-best-selling album in the United States in 2000 with 5,100,000 copies sold according to Nielsen SoundScan. On 30 August 2011 the band announced through their Facebook account that the album was available to pre-order from iTunes and that it was digitally remastered. On 24 September 2011, after the album made its digital debut in the iTunes Store it re-entered on the Billboard 200 at number four selling 60,000 units, it also topped the iTunes album charts in the US, Canada, Japan, the Netherlands, Mexico, Switzerland, Spain, New Zealand and Greece according to a Capitol/EMI press release. Its digital launch on the iTunes Store was accompanied with a price of $9.99 and a Twitter campaign with the hashtag #MyBeatles1 asking their fans: What is your favorite "1" track? Resulting in many celebrities and stars posting their favorites, too. In 2015, after it was remastered again and remixed by Giles Martin, 1 re-entered on the Billboard 200 at number six selling 40,000 units. It was certified eleven times platinum by the RIAA on 8 March 2010 denoting shipments of eleven million units, and 1 is included on the list of the Top 100 Albums by the Recording Industry Association of America. The album is the best-selling album of the 21st century in the US and the fourth-best-selling album in the Soundscan era (1991–present). As of October 2019, the album has sold 13 million copies in the US. In the US, the album secured the Beatles a fourth decade in which they placed an album at number 1 on the Billboard chart.

In Canada, 1 debuted at number 1 on the Canadian Albums Chart, selling 54,668 copies in its first week. The album was certified Diamond (1,000,000 units) by the CRIA in February 2001, just four months after its release. As of 2009, 1 has sold 1,103,000 units in Canada, making it the fifth-best-selling album ever in Canada of the Nielsen SoundScan era.

In Germany, 1 debuted at number 1 and stayed there for nine non-consecutive weeks. It stayed seventeen weeks in the top ten of the German Albums Chart and fifty weeks in the total chart. By selling 1,650,000 copies and reaching 11× Gold, it is the third-best-selling album of the decade 2000–2009 and the best-selling non-German language album.

In 2009, Apple Corps, the Beatles' company, stated that worldwide sales of 1 had exceeded 31 million copies. Worldwide in 2000 the album sold 13.8 million copies, with 2 million or more copies sold during two consecutive weeks, and was the fourth-best-selling album behind Eminem's The Marshall Mathers LP, Britney Spears' Oops!... I Did It Again, and Santana's Supernatural.

== Track listing ==
All tracks are written by Lennon–McCartney, except "Something" by George Harrison.

1 track listing
No.	Title	Original release	Length
1.	"Love Me Do"	Please Please Me, 1963	2:21
2.	"From Me to You"	single, 1963	1:55
3.	"She Loves You"	single, 1963	2:21
4.	"I Want to Hold Your Hand"	single, 1963	2:24
5.	"Can't Buy Me Love"	A Hard Day's Night, 1964	2:11
6.	"A Hard Day's Night"	A Hard Day's Night	2:33
7.	"I Feel Fine"	single, 1964	2:18
8.	"Eight Days a Week"	Beatles for Sale, 1964	2:43
9.	"Ticket to Ride"	Help!, 1965	3:07
10.	"Help!"	Help!	2:18
11.	"Yesterday"	Help!	2:05
12.	"Day Tripper"	single, 1965	2:48
13.	"We Can Work It Out"	single, 1965	2:18
14.	"Paperback Writer"	single, 1966	2:16
15.	"Yellow Submarine"	Revolver, 1966	2:37
16.	"Eleanor Rigby"	Revolver	2:06
17.	"Penny Lane"	single, 1967	3:00
18.	"All You Need Is Love"	single, 1967	3:46
19.	"Hello, Goodbye"	single, 1967	3:26
20.	"Lady Madonna"	single, 1968	2:15
21.	"Hey Jude"	single, 1968	7:03
22.	"Get Back"	single, 1969	3:13
23.	"The Ballad of John and Yoko"	single, 1969	2:57
24.	"Something"	Abbey Road, 1969	3:01
25.	"Come Together"	Abbey Road	4:16
26.	"Let It Be"	single, 1970	3:48
27.	"The Long and Winding Road"	Let It Be, 1970	3:36

=== Chart placements ===
1 song information
Song	Release date	UK chart placement	US chart placement
"Love Me Do"	5 October 1962 (UK); 27 April 1964 (US)	17	1
"From Me to You"	11 April 1963 (UK); 27 May 1963 (US)	1	41
"She Loves You"	23 August 1963 (UK); 16 September 1963 (US)	1	1
"I Want to Hold Your Hand"	29 November 1963 (UK); 26 December 1963 (US)	1	1
"Can't Buy Me Love"	20 March 1964 (UK); 16 March 1964 (US)	1	1
"A Hard Day's Night"	10 July 1964 (UK); 13 July 1964 (US)	1	1
"I Feel Fine"	27 November 1964 (UK); 23 November 1964 (US)	1	1
"Eight Days a Week"	15 February 1965 (US)	—	1
"Ticket to Ride"	9 April 1965 (UK); 19 April 1965 (US)	1	1
"Help!"	23 July 1965 (UK); 19 July 1965 (US)	1	1
"Yesterday"	13 September 1965 (US)	—	1
"Day Tripper"	3 November 1965 (UK); 6 November 1965 (US)	1	5
"We Can Work It Out"	3 November 1965 (UK); 6 November 1965 (US)	1	1
"Paperback Writer"	10 June 1966 (UK); 30 May 1966 (US)	1	1
"Yellow Submarine"	5 August 1966 (UK); 8 August 1966 (US)	1	2
"Eleanor Rigby"	5 August 1966 (UK); 8 August 1966 (US)	1	11
"Penny Lane"	17 February 1967 (UK); 13 February 1967	2	1
"All You Need Is Love"	7 July 1967 (UK); 17 July 1967 (US)	1	1
"Hello, Goodbye"	24 November 1967 (UK); 27 November 1967 (US)	1	1
"Lady Madonna"	15 March 1968 (UK); 18 March 1968 (US)	1	4
"Hey Jude"	30 August 1968 (UK); 26 August 1968 (US)	1	1
"Get Back"	11 April 1969 (UK); 5 May 1969 (US)	1	1
"The Ballad of John and Yoko"	30 May 1969 (UK); 4 June 1969 (US)	1	8
"Something"	31 October 1969 (UK); 6 October 1969 (US)	4	1
"Come Together"	31 October 1969 (UK); 6 October 1969 (US)	4	1
"Let It Be"	6 March 1970 (UK); 11 March 1970 (US)	2	1
"The Long and Winding Road"	11 May 1970 (US)	—	1
"—" denotes singles that were not released in that territory.

== Release variations ==
- 2000 CD. Apple 7243 5 29970 2 2 (Released in UK only)
- 2000 CD. Apple 7243 5 29325 2 8 (Worldwide release)
- 2011 CD. (Remastered). Apple 50999 083070 2 6
- 2015 CD. (Remixed). Apple 06025 475678 1 9 (as 1+ with two DVD or Blu-ray discs)

=== 1+ ===
1+
- DVD/Blu-ray cover

Greatest hits album / video album by the Beatles
- Released: 6 November 2015
- Length: 76:56
- Labels: Apple/Parlophone, Capitol
- Producer: Giles Martin

The Beatles chronology
The Japan Box (2014)	1+ (2015)	Live at the Hollywood Bowl (2016)

On 6 November 2015, Apple Records released a deluxe version of the original album, titled 1+. Most of the tracks on 1 have been remixed from the original multi-track masters by Giles Martin, except the first three tracks, which are the original mono mixes. In addition to the new mixes, there are surround sound 5.1 mixes presented as Dolby TrueHD and DTS-HD Master Audio in the Blu-ray version and Dolby Digital and DTS in the DVD version.

1+ also includes 50 promotional films/performances, plus commentary and introductions from Paul McCartney and Ringo Starr. All the videos have been digitally restored and enhanced. They are available on DVD and Blu-ray.

Variations of 1/1+ include standard CD, CD/DVD, CD/Blu-ray, CD/2DVD, CD/2Blu-ray. The double-disc video editions also feature a 124-page hard-bound book with illustrations. The DVD/Blu-ray video editions are also available as a stand-alone package.

First DVD/Blu-ray

1. "Love Me Do" – 2:21
  - The DVD/BD track is from The Little Theatre, Southport, Merseyside, England, 27 August 1963 recorded for the BBC documentary The Mersey Sound; it aired on 9 October.
2. "From Me to You" – 1:55
  - The DVD/BD track is from the Royal Variety Performance, Prince of Wales Theatre, London, England, 4 November 1963, aired on 10 November.
3. "She Loves You" – 2:21
  - The DVD/BD track is from the Swedish television pop music show Drop In, recorded 30 October 1963, aired 3 November.
4. "I Want to Hold Your Hand" – 2:24
  - The DVD/BD track is from Studio Four, Granada TV Centre, Manchester, England, 25 November 1963 filmed for Late Scene Extra, aired two days later.
5. "Can't Buy Me Love" – 2:11
  - The DVD/BD track is from the Beatles' television special Around the Beatles, music recorded on 19 April 1964, performed lip-synched on 28 April (at Studio 5 A/B, Wembley Studios, London, England), and aired on Rediffusion 6 May.
6. "A Hard Day's Night" – 2:33
  - The DVD/BD track is from the Palais des Sports, Paris, France, 20 June 1965, recorded/filmed for a 31 October broadcast of Les Beatles.
7. "I Feel Fine" – 2:18
  - The DVD/BD track is a promo video filmed at the Twickenham Film Studios, Middlesex, England, 23 November 1965.
8. "Eight Days a Week" – 2:43
  - The DVD/BD track is a montage of footage of their famous concert at Shea Stadium, New York City, 15 August 1965.
9. "Ticket to Ride" – 3:08
  - The DVD/BD track is a promo video filmed at Twickenham Film Studios, Middlesex, England, 23 November 1965.
10. "Help!" – 2:18
  - The DVD/BD track is a promo video filmed at Twickenham Film Studios, Middlesex, England, 23 November 1965.
11. "Yesterday" – 2:05
  - The DVD/BD track is from The Ed Sullivan Show, New York City, recorded 14 August 1965, aired 12 September.
12. "Day Tripper" – 2:48
  - The DVD/BD track is a promo video filmed at Twickenham Film Studios, Middlesex, England, 23 November 1965.
13. "We Can Work It Out" – 2:15
  - The DVD/BD track is a promo video filmed at Twickenham Film Studios, Middlesex, England, 23 November 1965.
14. "Paperback Writer" – 2:16
  - The DVD/BD is a promo video filmed in colour at Chiswick House, Chiswick, London, England, 20 May 1966; later aired in black and white on Top of the Pops.
15. "Yellow Submarine" – 2:37
  - The DVD/BD track is montage of footage from the animated film Yellow Submarine (1968).
16. "Eleanor Rigby" – 2:06
  - The DVD/BD track is a sequence originally found as a part of Yellow Submarine.
17. "Penny Lane" – 3:00
  - The DVD/BD track is a promo video filmed on 5 & 7 February 1967 in England (Stratford, London; Knole Park, Sevenoaks, Kent; Liverpool (non-Beatles footage)); later aired on Juke Box Jury, Top of the Pops (both from the BBC), and The Hollywood Palace (in the US).
18. "All You Need Is Love" – 3:46
  - The DVD/BD track is a live broadcast from Studio One, Abbey Road Studios, London, England, 25 June 1967 for the Our World special. The pre-recorded backing track was done on 14 June as the orchestra, vocals, drums, bass, and guitar solo were recorded and filmed live in the studio. Famous guests who appeared included Mick Jagger and Keith Richards (of The Rolling Stones), Eric Clapton, Keith Moon of The Who, Graham Nash of The Hollies, Mike McGear (McCartney's brother), and Gary Walker of The Walker Brothers. The orchestra can be heard playing Bach's Brandenburg Concerto and the traditional song "Greensleeves" (which Martin was paid £15 for) during the extended fade-out in the 6-minute broadcast.
19. "Hello, Goodbye" – 3:26
  - The DVD/BD track is a promo video filmed at the Saville Theatre, London, England, 10 November 1967 featuring the Beatles in their Sgt. Pepper outfits (unlike the first of the other two video versions of the song which are included on the second disc). It later aired on the Sunday 26 November episode of The Ed Sullivan Show and The Hollywood Palace two days later. Due to the Musicians' Union's ban on miming during performances in the UK, the video was replaced by a montage of shots from the film A Hard Day's Night (1964) for 23 November broadcast of Top of the Pops and the film Magical Mystery Tour (1967) two weeks later.
20. "Lady Madonna" – 2:15
  - The DVD/BD track is a promo video filmed in Studio Three, Abbey Road Studios, London, England, 11 February 1968 and at Chappell Studios, London, England three days later. It included shots of the band recording "Hey Bulldog" (with its accompanying video found on the second disc).
21. "Hey Jude" – 7:03
  - The DVD/BD track is a promotional recording made on 4 September 1968 at Twickenham Film Studios, Middlesex, England, with a live vocal from McCartney. It later aired on Frost on Sunday (by David Frost) on 6 October 1968, and a month later on The Smothers Brothers Comedy Hour.
22. "Get Back" – 3:12
  - The DVD/BD track is a promo video featuring filmed footage at the famous Apple rooftop concert in Savile Row, Mayfair, London, England, 30 January 1969. Edits and mash-ups of the three times they played the song were done by Apple Films for later broadcasts such as Top of the Pops.
23. "The Ballad of John and Yoko" – 2:57
  - The DVD/BD track is a promo video created by Apple Films with outtakes from the film Let It Be (1970) and footage shot at places like London, Paris, Amsterdam, and Vienna.
24. "Something" – 3:01
25. "Come Together" – 4:16
  - The DVD/BD track is a multimedia clip created by Melon Dezign for the launch of the Beatles' official website, which was done to celebrate the original release of 1.
26. "Let It Be" – 3:48
  - The DVD/BD track is from the film Let It Be being synced with the single version for promotional release. It was of the recording sessions for said song at Apple Studio, Savile Row, London, England, 31 January 1969, a day after the Apple rooftop concert.
27. "The Long and Winding Road" – 3:36
  - The DVD/BD track is from the film Let It Be, with footage being used from the same recording sessions as "Let It Be". The only exception with both videos is that the audio from the sessions was used in this video instead of the one for "Let It Be".

Second DVD/Blu-ray

1. "Twist and Shout" (Bert Berns/Phil Medley)
  - Recorded at Studio Four, Granada TV Centre, Manchester, England, 14 August 1963 as a part of Scene at 6.30.
2. "Baby It's You" (Burt Bacharach/Mack David/Barney Williams)
  - From episode 2 of the BBC radio series Pop Go the Beatles, recorded 1 June 1963, aired 11 June; combined with black and white footage of the Beatles' dancing and released to promote Live at the BBC. (1994)
3. "Words of Love" (Buddy Holly)
  - From episode 10 of Pop Go the Beatles, recorded 16 July 1963, aired 20 August, with sound effects added in video production; released to promote On Air – Live at the BBC Volume 2. (2013)
4. "Please Please Me"
  - From The Ed Sullivan Show, recorded 9 February 1964 (at Studio 50, New York City), aired 23 February.
5. "I Feel Fine"
  - Alternative promotional film. Filmed at Twickenham Film Studios, Middlesex, England, 23 November 1965.
6. "Day Tripper"
  - Lip-synching filmed for the television special The Music of Lennon and McCartney (done at Granada TV Centre, Manchester, England, 1–2 November 1965), aired 16 December 1965 in London, 17 December in the rest of Britain.
7. "Day Tripper"
  - Alternative promotional film. Filmed at Twickenham Film Studios, Middlesex, England, 23 November 1965.
8. "We Can Work It Out"
  - Alternative promotional film. Filmed at Twickenham Film Studios, Middlesex, England, 23 November 1965.
9. "Paperback Writer"
  - Alternative promotional film. Filmed at Studio One, Abbey Road Studios, London, England, 19 May 1966.
10. "Rain"
  - Promo video filmed in colour at Chiswick House, Chiswick, London, England, 20 May 1966; later aired in black and white on Top of the Pops.
11. "Rain"
  - Alternative promotional film. Filmed at Studio One, Abbey Road Studios, London, England, 19 May 1966; later aired in black and white on Ready Steady Go! on 3 June.
12. "Strawberry Fields Forever"
  - Promo video filmed at Knole Park, Sevenoaks, Kent, 30–31 January 1967; later aired as an audio-only clip on Juke Box Jury and in its entirety on Top of the Pops.
13. "Within You Without You/Tomorrow Never Knows"
  - Mash-up from the album Love. (2006)
14. "A Day in the Life"
  - Promo video filmed at Studio One, Abbey Road Studios, London, England, 10 February 1967 during the recording sessions of said song who included the orchestra with their wacky costumes Mick Jagger and Keith Richards of The Rolling Stones, which provided the inspiration for the live broadcast for "All You Need Is Love".
15. "Hello, Goodbye"
  - Alternative version. Promo video filmed at Saville Theatre, London, England, 10 November 1967; featured the Beatles in "street clothes".
16. "Hello, Goodbye"
  - Third version promotional film. Promo video filmed at Saville Theatre, London, England, 10 November 1967. It's a combination of the previous two videos along with additional footage.
17. "Hey Bulldog"
  - Promo video filmed at Studio Three, Abbey Road Studios, London, England, 11 February 1968 during the recording sessions of said song and re-edited in 1999; some of the footage was used in the "Lady Madonna" promo video (included on the first disc).
18. "Hey Jude"
  - Alternative promotional recording made on 4 September 1968, with live vocal from McCartney; the audio differences from the version on the first disc are the introduction of the song and McCartney's live vocal.
19. "Revolution"
  - Promotional recording made on 4 September 1968 at Twickenham Film Studios, Middlesex, England, with live vocals (and the backing track in mono); later aired on Top of the Pops on 19 September and The Smothers Brothers Comedy Hour on 13 October, both in black and white.
20. "Get Back"
  - Filmed at Twickenham Studios and Apple Studio, Savile Row, London, England, 28 January 1969 and edited together to promote Let It Be... Naked. (2003)
21. "Don't Let Me Down"
  - Audio track from the album Let It Be... Naked, an edit of two of the Apple headquarters rooftop performances on 30 January 1969 at Savile Row, London, England.
22. "Free as a Bird (2015 Mix)" (Lennon/McCartney/Harrison/Richard Starkey)
  - Filmed for the premiere (and aired as a part) of the documentary The Beatles Anthology on 19 November 1995. The video uses a new mix of the song, prepared for this release, which cleans up Lennon's vocal further, and uses a different take of Harrison's vocal phrase, replacing the lyric "whatever happened to the life that we once knew" with "whatever happened to the love that we once knew"
23. "Real Love (2015 Mix)" (Lennon)
  - Filmed originally for The Beatles Anthology but later used as a part of the 2003 DVD reissue of the documentary; a different video was used for the second instalment of the documentary on 22 November 1995. The video uses a new mix of the song, prepared for this release, which cleans up Lennon's vocal further, and reinstates several deleted elements originally recorded in 1995, such as lead guitar phrases and drum fills, as well as making the harpsichord and harmonium more prominent in the mix.

== Personnel ==
- John Lennon – vocals, guitars, keyboards, harmonica, percussion, six-string bass on "The Long and Winding Road"
- Paul McCartney – vocals, bass, keyboards, guitars, percussion, drums on "The Ballad of John and Yoko"
- George Harrison – guitars, percussion, backing vocals, lead vocals on "Something"
- Ringo Starr – drums, percussion, lead vocals on "Yellow Submarine", backing vocals on "Hey Jude"

Additional musicians

- George Martin – piano on "A Hard Day's Night", "Penny Lane" and "All You Need Is Love"
- Mal Evans – bass drum on "Yellow Submarine"
- David Mason – piccolo trumpet solo on "Penny Lane", trumpet on "All You Need Is Love"
- Billy Preston – Hammond organ on "Let It Be" and "Something", electric piano on "Get Back" and "The Long and Winding Road"
- Ronnie Scott – tenor saxophone solo on "Lady Madonna"
- Andy White – drums on "Love Me Do"

== Charts ==
=== Weekly charts ===
Weekly chart performance for 1
Chart (2000–2020)	Peak position
Australian Albums (ARIA)	1
Austrian Albums (Ö3 Austria)	1
Belgian Albums (Ultratop Flanders)	1
Belgian Albums (Ultratop Wallonia)	1
Canadian Albums (Billboard)	1
Colombian Albums (ASINCOL)	1
Czech Albums (ČNS IFPI)	6
Danish Albums (Hitlisten)	2
Dutch Albums (Album Top 100)	1
European Albums (Top 100)	1
Finnish Albums (Suomen virallinen lista)	1
French Albums (SNEP)	10
German Albums (Offizielle Top 100)	1
Hungarian Albums (MAHASZ)	14
Irish Albums (IRMA)	1
Italian Albums (FIMI)	1
Japanese Albums (Oricon)	1
Mexican Albums (Top 100 Mexico)	49
South Korean Albums (Circle)	5
South Korean International Albums (Circle)	1
New Zealand Albums (RMNZ)	1
Norwegian Albums (VG-lista)	1
Polish Albums (ZPAV)	1
Portuguese Albums (AFP)	1
Spanish Albums (Promusicae)	1
Swedish Albums (Sverigetopplistan)	1
Swiss Albums (Schweizer Hitparade)	1
UK Albums (Official Charts)	1
US Billboard 200	1
US Top Catalog Albums (Billboard)	1
US Top Rock Albums (Billboard)	3

=== Year-end charts ===
Year-end chart performance for 1
Chart (2000)	Position
Australian Albums (ARIA)	1
Austrian Albums (Ö3 Austria)	19
Belgian Albums (Ultratop Flanders)	16
Belgian Albums (Ultratop Wallonia)	5
Canadian Albums (Nielsen SoundScan)	4
Danish Albums (Hitlisten)	3
Dutch Albums (Album Top 100)	31
European Albums (Music & Media)	46
French Compilations (SNEP)	1
German Albums (Offizielle Top 100)	9
Italian Albums (FIMI)	1
Japanese Albums (Oricon)	31
South Korean International Albums (MIAK)	6
Swedish Albums & Compilations (Sverigetopplistan)	1
Swiss Albums (Schweizer Hitparade)	21
UK Albums (OCC)	1
Worldwide Albums (IFPI)	6

2001 year-end chart performance for 1
Chart (2001)	Position
Australian Albums (ARIA)	14
Austrian Albums (Ö3 Austria)	1
Belgian Albums (Ultratop Flanders)	35
Belgian Albums (Ultratop Wallonia)	10
Canadian Albums (Nielsen SoundScan)	17
Danish Albums (Hitlisten)	28
Dutch Albums (Album Top 100)	17
European Albums (Music & Media)	2
German Albums (Offizielle Top 100)	6
Italian Albums (FIMI)	9
Japanese Albums (Oricon)	17
New Zealand Albums (RMNZ)	35
Spanish Albums (AFYVE)	7
Swedish Albums (Sverigetopplistan)	50
Swedish Albums & Compilations (Sverigetopplistan)	68
Swiss Albums (Schweizer Hitparade)	10
UK Albums (OCC)	35
US Billboard 200	1
Worldwide Albums (IFPI)	27

2002 year-end chart performance for 1
Chart (2002)	Position
Australian Albums (ARIA)	61
Canadian Albums (Nielsen SoundScan)	98
UK Albums (OCC)	148
US Billboard 200	94

2003 year-end chart performance for 1
Chart (2003)	Position
UK Albums (OCC)	170
US Catalog Albums (Billboard)	2

2004 year-end chart performance for 1
Chart (2004)	Position
US Catalog Albums (Billboard)	1

2005 year-end chart performance for 1
Chart (2005)	Position
US Catalog Albums (Billboard)	3

2006 year-end chart performance for 1
Chart (2006)	Position
US Catalog Albums (Billboard)	7

2007 year-end chart performance for 1
Chart (2007)	Position
US Catalog Albums (Billboard)	10

2008 year-end chart performance for 1
Chart (2008)	Position
US Catalog Albums (Billboard)	19

2009 year-end chart performance for 1
Chart (2009)	Position
Italian Albums (FIMI)	92
US Catalog Albums (Billboard)	45

2010 year-end chart performance for 1
Chart (2010)	Position
South Korean International Albums (Circle)	21
US Catalog Albums (Billboard)	4

2011 year-end chart performance for 1
Chart (2011)	Position
South Korean International Albums (Gaon)	19
UK Albums (OCC)	147
US Billboard 200	175
US Catalog Albums (Billboard)	14

2012 year-end chart performance for 1
Chart (2012)	Position
South Korean International Albums (Gaon)	16
US Catalog Albums (Billboard)	46

2013 year-end chart performance for 1
Chart (2013)	Position
Belgian Albums (Ultratop Flanders)	144
South Korean International Albums (Gaon)	34
US Catalog Albums (Billboard)	28

2014 year-end chart performance for 1
Chart (2014)	Position
Belgian Albums (Ultratop Flanders)	119
Belgian Albums (Ultratop Wallonia)	139
US Billboard 200	188
US Catalog Albums (Billboard)	17

2015 year-end chart performance for 1
Chart (2015)	Position
Belgian Albums (Ultratop Flanders)	80
Belgian Albums (Ultratop Wallonia)	120
German Albums (Offizielle Top 100)	60
Italian Albums (FIMI)	75
Japan Hot Albums (Billboard Japan)	17
Japanese Albums (Oricon)	29
UK Albums (OCC)	42

2016 year-end chart performance for 1
Chart (2016)	Position
Belgian Albums (Ultratop Flanders)	77
Belgian Albums (Ultratop Wallonia)	93
Japan Hot Albums (Billboard Japan)	84
UK Albums (OCC)	93
US Billboard 200	66
US Catalog Albums (Billboard)	13

2017 year-end chart performance for 1
Chart (2017)	Position
Belgian Albums (Ultratop Wallonia)	191
US Billboard 200	149
US Catalog Albums (Billboard)	32
US Top Rock Albums (Billboard)	25

2018 year-end chart performance for 1
Chart (2018)	Position
UK Albums (OCC)	87
US Billboard 200	127
US Catalog Albums (Billboard)	26
US Top Rock Albums (Billboard)	15

2019 year-end chart performance for 1
Chart (2019)	Position
Irish Albums (IRMA)	50
UK Albums (OCC)	49
US Billboard 200	97
US Catalog Albums (Billboard)	21
US Top Rock Albums (Billboard)	14

2020 year-end chart performance for 1
Chart (2020)	Position
Irish Albums (IRMA)	38
UK Albums (OCC)	34
US Billboard 200	76
US Catalog Albums (Billboard)	7
US Top Rock Albums (Billboard)	7

2021 year-end chart performance for 1
Chart (2021)	Position
Irish Albums (IRMA)	34
UK Albums (OCC)	34
US Billboard 200	84
US Catalog Albums (Billboard)	18
US Top Rock Albums (Billboard)	10

2022 year-end chart performance for 1
Chart (2022)	Position
UK Albums (OCC)	31
US Billboard 200	181
US Top Rock Albums (Billboard)	28

2023 year-end chart performance for 1
Chart (2023)	Position
UK Albums (OCC)	60

=== Decade-end charts ===
2000s-end chart performance for 1
Chart (2000–09)	Position
Australian Albums (ARIA)	20
UK Albums (OCC)	6
US Billboard 200	8
US Catalog Albums (Billboard)	5

== Certifications and sales ==
Certifications and sales for 1
Region	Certification	Certified units/sales
Argentina (CAPIF)	2× Platinum	120,000^{^}
Australia (ARIA)	10× Platinum	750,000
Austria (IFPI Austria)	3× Platinum	150,000^{*}
Belgium (BRMA)	5× Platinum	250,000^{*}
Brazil (Pro-Música Brasil)	Platinum	250,000^{*}
Canada (Music Canada)	Diamond	1,231,000
Chile (IFPI Chile)	Platinum	25,000
Denmark (IFPI Danmark)	4× Platinum	200,000^{^}
Denmark (IFPI Danmark) reissue	Platinum	20,000^{‡}
Finland (Musiikkituottajat)	Platinum	77,466
France (SNEP)	2× Platinum	650,000
Germany (BVMI)	11× Gold	1,650,000^{^}
Italy sales 2000–2001	—	1,000,000
Italy (FIMI) sales since 2009	2× Platinum	100,000^{‡}
Japan (RIAJ)	2× Million	2,000,000^{^}
Netherlands (NVPI)	4× Platinum	320,000^{^}
New Zealand (RMNZ)	15× Platinum	225,000^{^}
Norway (IFPI Norway)	3× Platinum	150,000^{*}
Poland (ZPAV)	Platinum	70,000^{*}
Portugal (AFP)	3× Platinum	120,000^{^}
Singapore	—	50,000
South Korea	—	620,175
Spain (Promusicae)	5× Platinum	500,000^{^}
Sweden (GLF)	2× Platinum	215,000
Switzerland (IFPI Switzerland)	3× Platinum	150,000^{^}
United Kingdom (BPI)	13× Platinum	3,900,000^{‡}
United States (RIAA)	11× Platinum	11,000,000^{^} / 12,410,000
Summaries
Europe (IFPI)	9× Platinum	9,000,000^{*}
Worldwide	—	31,000,000
^{*} Sales figures based on certification alone.^{^} Shipments figures based on certification alone.^{‡} Sales+streaming figures based on certification alone.

== See also ==
- List of best-selling albums
- List of most expensive albums
- Outline of the Beatles
- The Beatles timeline
- List of best-selling albums of the 2000s (decade) in the United Kingdom
