= 20 Greatest Hits (Beatles album) =

Greatest hits album by the Beatles
- Released: 11 October 1982 (US edition); 18 October 1982 (UK edition)
- Recorded: 11 September 1962 – 1 April 1970
- Studios: EMI, Trident and Apple studios, London and Pathé Marconi Studio, Paris
- Genre: Rock
- Length: 59:31 (US edition); 56:45 (UK edition)
- Labels: Capitol (US); Parlophone (UK)
- Producers: George Martin and Phil Spector (US edition: side 2 track 8)

The Beatles chronology
The Beatles Mono Collection (1982)	20 Greatest Hits (1982)	Past Masters (1988)

Professional ratings
Review scores
Source	Rating
AllMusic	3/5 stars
The Encyclopedia of Popular Music	4/5 stars

20 Greatest Hits is a compilation album featuring a selection of songs by The Beatles that were number one singles in the UK and US. It was released on 11 October 1982 in the United States and 18 October in the United Kingdom and marked the 20th anniversary of The Beatles' first record release, "Love Me Do", in the UK in October 1962. 20 Greatest Hits was the last Beatles album to be released with variations between the U.S. and UK versions (some Beatles hits in the US were not released as singles in the UK, such as "Eight Days a Week" and "Yesterday"). There is an extremely rare 8 track tape version of this album, of which approximately 10 to 15 copies still exist today. Capitol Records decided not to release the album in the format, as 8 tracks were not selling well in late 1982. However, in early 1983, they made a few copies available through Capitol Special Markets.

The band's 2000 compilation album 1 is a combination of both versions of 20 Greatest Hits.

== Releases ==
=== UK edition ===
The UK version of the album comprised all 19 tracks from the 17 Beatles singles to top the UK Singles Chart (including both sides of the double A-sides "Day Tripper"/"We Can Work It Out" and "Yellow Submarine"/"Eleanor Rigby") plus the Beatles' first chart hit "Love Me Do", which peaked at number 17 in the UK.

The songs were presented in their original stereo mixes except for "Love Me Do" and "She Loves You", which used the Duophonic versions – the last time a new Beatles release would use such mixes. Similarly to 1962-1966, 20 Greatest Hits uses the same "whispering intro" mix of "I Feel Fine".

Although many documentaries state that the first number 1 of The Beatles in England was "Please Please Me", the track does not appear in this collection, and also does not appear in the compilation 1.

=== US edition ===
For the US LP, catalogue number SV 12245, a five-minute edited version of "Hey Jude" was used due to time constraints.

The American version of this LP was also released in other countries, although the track list does not reflect the local number ones. For instance, in Canada "Can't Buy Me Love" only reached No. 3 on the CHUM singles charts, and the Canadian No. 1 hits "All My Loving" and "This Boy" are omitted.

The New Zealand version was the same as the American one although originally EMI (NZ) was going to issue the UK version. The covers were printed in New Zealand but the inner sleeve was imported from the U.S.

The original issues of this album accidentally indicates the running time of "Yesterday" as being 1:04 in length. Later issues have the correct 2:04 running time.

The album featured the first US appearance of "I Want to Hold Your Hand" and "I Feel Fine" in true stereo.

=== Other versions ===
In 1979 and 1980, a similar album called 20 Golden Hits was issued in many countries outside Britain and the U.S.

In Australia, a 23-track alternate version of this album, with bonus EP, was issued titled The Number Ones, released in 1983.

This single-disc compilation was supplanted by the later single-CD album 1 with all 27 of the 28 Beatles songs that were number one on either side of the Atlantic including George Harrison's "Something" that was absent from the original collection. Harrison's "For You Blue", the B-Side of "The Long and Winding Road", which was also charted in the top spot by Billboard, was not included on that album.

== Track listing ==
All songs written by Lennon–McCartney

=== UK edition ===
Side one
No.	Title	Length
1.	"Love Me Do"	2:23
2.	"From Me to You"	1:56
3.	"She Loves You"	2:22
4.	"I Want to Hold Your Hand"	2:27
5.	"Can't Buy Me Love"	2:14
6.	"A Hard Day's Night"	2:34
7.	"I Feel Fine"	2:20
8.	"Ticket to Ride"	3:10
9.	"Help!"	2:19
10.	"Day Tripper"	2:50
11.	"We Can Work It Out"	2:17

Side two
No.	Title	Length
1.	"Paperback Writer"	2:19
2.	"Yellow Submarine"	2:38
3.	"Eleanor Rigby"	2:08
4.	"All You Need Is Love"	3:49
5.	"Hello, Goodbye"	3:30
6.	"Lady Madonna"	2:16
7.	"Hey Jude"	7:11
8.	"Get Back"	3:13
9.	"The Ballad of John and Yoko"	2:59

=== US edition ===
Side one
No.	Title	Length
1.	"She Loves You"	2:22
2.	"Love Me Do"	2:23
3.	"I Want to Hold Your Hand"	2:27
4.	"Can't Buy Me Love"	2:14
5.	"A Hard Day's Night"	2:34
6.	"I Feel Fine"	2:20
7.	"Eight Days a Week"	2:45
8.	"Ticket to Ride"	3:10
9.	"Help!"	2:19
10.	"Yesterday"	2:06
11.	"We Can Work It Out"	2:17
12.	"Paperback Writer"	2:19

Side two
No.	Title	Length
1.	"Penny Lane"	3:02
2.	"All You Need Is Love"	3:49
3.	"Hello, Goodbye"	3:30
4.	"Hey Jude"	5:05
5.	"Get Back"	3:13
6.	"Come Together"	4:19
7.	"Let It Be"	3:52
8.	"The Long and Winding Road"	3:38

Note: On the US Cassette (EMI-Capitol 4XV-12245) "Penny Lane" is track 13, but appears at the end of Side 1, rather than the beginning of Side 2. On the original United States LP and Canadian cassette versions of the album "Hey Jude" was edited 5:09 due to time constraints. The United States cassette edition contains the full version of the song.

== Charts ==
=== Charts ===
Chart (1982)	Peak position
Australian (Kent Music Report)	52
Canada Top Albums/CDs (RPM)	50
New Zealand Albums (RMNZ)	4
UK Albums (Official Charts)	10
US Billboard 200	50

== Certifications and sales ==
Region	Certification	Certified units/sales
Argentina	—	100,000
Canada (Music Canada)	3× Platinum	300,000^{^}
United Kingdom (BPI)	Platinum	300,000^{^}
United States (RIAA)	2× Platinum	2,000,000^{^}
Yugoslavia	—	99,000
^{^} Shipments figures based on certification alone.

== See also ==
- The Number Ones
- Outline of the Beatles
- The Beatles timeline
