= 1967–1970 =

1973 compilation album by the Beatles

Compilation album by the Beatles
- Released: 2 April 1973
- Recorded: 28 November 1966 – 1 April 1970
- Studios: EMI, Olympic, Apple and Trident, London
- Genres: Rock; psychedelia
- Length: 99:40
- Label: Apple
- Producers: George Martin, Phil Spector
- Compiler: Allen Klein

The Beatles chronology
1962–1966 (1973)	1967–1970 (1973)	The Singles Collection 1962–1970 (1976)

Professional ratings
Review scores
Source	Rating
AllMusic	4.5/5 stars
Blender	4/5 stars
The Encyclopedia of Popular Music	5/5 stars
The Rolling Stone Album Guide	4.5/5 stars

1967–1970 (also known as the Blue Album) is a compilation album of songs by the English rock band the Beatles, spanning the years indicated in the title and the albums Sgt. Pepper's Lonely Hearts Club Band through to Let It Be with numerous single releases in between. A double LP, it was released with 1962–1966 (the "Red Album") in April 1973. 1967–1970 topped the Billboard albums chart in the United States and peaked at number 2 on the UK Albums Chart. It was re-released in September 1993 on CD, charting at number 4 in the United Kingdom.

The album was instigated by Apple Records manager Allen Klein during his final months before being dismissed from that position. As with 1962–1966, the compilation was created by Apple and EMI/Capitol Records in response to a bootleg collection titled Alpha Omega, which had been sold on television the previous year. Print advertising for the two records made a point of declaring them "the only authorized collection of the Beatles". The success of the two official double LP compilations inspired Capitol's repackaging of the Beach Boys' 1960s hits, starting with the 1974 album Endless Summer.

A deluxe expanded version of the album was released on 10 November 2023, featuring the previously unreleased song "Now and Then", the final original single by the group. The deluxe edition features the album anniversary remix versions of the songs.

== Album covers ==
For the group's 1963 debut LP Please Please Me, photographer Angus McBean took the distinctive colour photograph of the group looking down over the stairwell inside EMI House (EMI's London headquarters in Manchester Square, demolished in 1995).

In 1969, the Beatles asked McBean to recreate this shot. Although a photograph from the 1969 photo shoot was originally intended for the then-planned Get Back album, it was not used when that project saw eventual release in 1970 as Let It Be. Instead, another photograph from the 1969 shoot and an unused photograph from the 1963 photo shoot were used for both this LP and 1962–1966 respectively.

The inner gatefold photo for both LPs has been attributed to both Stephen Goldblatt and Don McCullin, and is from the "Mad Day Out" photo session in London on Sunday 28 July 1968.

The album cover was designed by Tom Wilkes.

== International versions ==
Unlike the 1962–1966 collection, the Blue Album is largely the same in the U.S. and the UK, although there are some variations.

The U.S. edition has "Strawberry Fields Forever" in its original 1966 stereo mix, while "Penny Lane" and "Hello, Goodbye" are presented in mono, and "I Am the Walrus" with a four-beat electric piano introduction; the UK version had the more common six-beat beginning.

The albums has several other variants and anomalies. "Get Back" is described as the album version in the U.S. liner notes, although it is, in fact, the single version. In both countries, "Hey Jude" is around nine seconds shorter than it had been on the original single, although the full length was restored for the 1993 compact disc edition.

The original vinyl version fades in during the crowd noise at the beginning of "A Day in the Life". The fade in is different on both the UK and U.S. versions. The original compact disc edition, meanwhile, features a clean version previously heard on the Imagine: John Lennon soundtrack album in 1988.

On the Spanish edition, "One After 909" replaces "The Ballad of John and Yoko", a song that had been banned from the airwaves shortly after being released as a single in 1969, for its allusions to "Christ" and "Gibraltar" in the lyrics.

== Release variations ==
- Original 1973 UK release: Apple PCSP 7181-2
- Original 1973 US release: Apple SKBO-3404 (whole and sliced apples in blue background)
- Second 1976 US pressing: Capitol SKBO-3404 (Capitol target label on back of album cover, blue label with "Capitol" in light blue letters at bottom)
- 1978 first US blue vinyl release: Capitol SEBX-11843 (Capitol dome label on back of album cover, large dome logo at top of light blue labels)
- 1980 East German release. Amiga 8 55 742. One disc only with 14 tracks, mostly from disc 1 of the original version.
- 1993 CD release. Apple 0777 7 97039 2 0 (whole and sliced apples in blue background)
- 2010 remastered CD release. Apple 5099990674723 (whole and sliced apples in blue background)

=== 2023 remixed editions ===
The compilation, along with its counterpart, was rereleased with an expanded track listing on 10 November 2023.

The nine additional tracks are: "Within You Without You", "Dear Prudence", "Glass Onion", "Blackbird", "Hey Bulldog", "Oh! Darling", "I Want You (She's So Heavy)", "I Me Mine", and "Now and Then".

Six tracks ("I Am the Walrus", "The Fool on the Hill", "Magical Mystery Tour", "Revolution", "Hey Bulldog", and "Old Brown Shoe") received new stereo mixes for this release. The stereo mixes for the remaining tracks were sourced from those created for the following previously released album reissues: 1 (2015), Sgt. Pepper's Lonely Hearts Club Band: 50th Anniversary Edition (2017), The Beatles: 50th Anniversary Edition (2018), Abbey Road: 50th Anniversary Edition (2019), and Let It Be: Special Edition (2021). The album is also available in Dolby Atmos surround sound. On the CD and digital editions, the additional tracks are inserted into the track list in chronological order of each track's original issue, while on the vinyl edition, the first two LPs retain the track list of the 1973 release, with the additional tracks placed on a third LP. The vinyl edition come in both standard and coloured vinyl with each compilation's respective colours.

Of note, both "A Day in the Life" and "Dear Prudence" feature clean openings on the 2023 release, as opposed to their album counterparts, which are crossfaded with their respective preceding tracks. The dialogue introduction previously added to the 2021 Mix of "Don't Let Me Down" for Let It Be: Special Edition has also been removed.

== Track listing ==
- The singles "Strawberry Fields Forever", "Penny Lane", "Hello, Goodbye", "Lady Madonna", "Hey Jude" and "The Ballad of John and Yoko", the B-sides "I Am the Walrus", "Revolution", "Don't Let Me Down" and "Old Brown Shoe", and the single versions of "Get Back" and "Let It Be" make their global album debut in this compilation.

All tracks are written by Lennon–McCartney, except where noted.

Disc 1, side 1
No.	Title	Album	Length
1.	"Strawberry Fields Forever"	non-album single, 1967 (UK); later included on Magical Mystery Tour LP, 1967 (U.S.)	4:08
2.	"Penny Lane"	non-album single, 1967 (UK); later included on Magical Mystery Tour LP, 1967 (U.S.)	3:01
3.	"Sgt. Pepper's Lonely Hearts Club Band"	from Sgt. Pepper's Lonely Hearts Club Band, 1967	2:02
4.	"With a Little Help from My Friends"	from Sgt. Pepper's Lonely Hearts Club Band, 1967	2:44
5.	"Lucy in the Sky with Diamonds"	from Sgt. Pepper's Lonely Hearts Club Band, 1967	3:29
6.	"A Day in the Life"	from Sgt. Pepper's Lonely Hearts Club Band, 1967	5:07
7.	"All You Need Is Love"	non-album single, 1967 (UK); later included on Magical Mystery Tour LP, 1967 (U.S.)	3:48
Total length:			24:19

Disc 1, side 2
No.	Title	Album	Length
1.	"I Am the Walrus"	B-side, 1967; included on Magical Mystery Tour EP and LP, 1967	4:35
2.	"Hello, Goodbye"	non-album single, 1967 (UK); later included on Magical Mystery Tour LP, 1967 (U.S.)	3:29
3.	"The Fool on the Hill"	from Magical Mystery Tour EP and LP, 1967	3:00
4.	"Magical Mystery Tour"	from Magical Mystery Tour EP and LP, 1967	2:49
5.	"Lady Madonna"	non-album single, 1968	2:18
6.	"Hey Jude"	non-album single, 1968	7:11
7.	"Revolution"	non-album B-side, 1968	3:25
Total length:			26:47

Disc 2, side 1
No.	Title	Writer(s)	Album	Length
1.	"Back in the U.S.S.R."		from The Beatles, 1968	2:46
2.	"While My Guitar Gently Weeps"	George Harrison	from The Beatles, 1968	4:46
3.	"Ob-La-Di, Ob-La-Da"		from The Beatles, 1968	3:11
4.	"Get Back"		non-album single, 1969	3:12
5.	"Don't Let Me Down"		non-album B-side, 1969	3:35
6.	"The Ballad of John and Yoko"		non-album single, 1969	3:01
7.	"Old Brown Shoe"	Harrison	non-album B-side, 1969	3:21
Total length:				23:52

Disc 2, side 2
No.	Title	Writer(s)	Album	Length
1.	"Here Comes the Sun"	Harrison	from Abbey Road, 1969	3:07
2.	"Come Together"		from Abbey Road, 1969	4:19
3.	"Something"	Harrison	from Abbey Road, 1969	3:03
4.	"Octopus's Garden"	Richard Starkey	from Abbey Road, 1969	2:52
5.	"Let It Be"		non-album single, 1970	3:52
6.	"Across the Universe"		from Let It Be, 1970	3:50
7.	"The Long and Winding Road"		from Let It Be, 1970	3:40
Total length:				24:42

2023 edition

All tracks are written by Lennon-McCartney, except where noted.

Disc 1
No.	Title	Writer(s)	Lead vocals	Length
1.	"Strawberry Fields Forever (2015 Mix)" (non-album single, 1967 (UK); later included on Magical Mystery Tour LP, 1967 (U.S.))		Lennon	4:12
2.	"Penny Lane (2017 Mix)" (non-album single, 1967 (UK); later included on Magical Mystery Tour LP, 1967 (U.S.))		McCartney	3:00
3.	"Sgt. Pepper's Lonely Hearts Club Band (2017 Mix)" (from Sgt. Pepper's Lonely Hearts Club Band, 1967)		McCartney	2:02
4.	"With a Little Help from My Friends (2017 Mix)" (from Sgt. Pepper's Lonely Hearts Club Band, 1967)		Starr	2:44
5.	"Lucy in the Sky with Diamonds (2017 Mix)" (from Sgt. Pepper's Lonely Hearts Club Band, 1967)		Lennon	3:30
6.	"Within You Without You (2017 Mix)" (from Sgt. Pepper's Lonely Hearts Club Band, 1967)	George Harrison	Harrison	5:11
7.	"A Day in the Life (2017 Mix)" (from Sgt. Pepper's Lonely Hearts Club Band, 1967)		Lennon with McCartney	5:07
8.	"All You Need Is Love (2015 Mix)" (non-album single, 1967 (UK); later included on Magical Mystery Tour LP, 1967 (U.S.))		Lennon	3:49
9.	"I Am the Walrus (2023 Mix)" (non-album B-side, 1967; included on Magical Mystery Tour EP and LP, 1967)		Lennon	4:35
10.	"Hello, Goodbye (2015 Mix)" (non-album single, 1967 (UK); later included on Magical Mystery Tour LP, 1967 (U.S.))		McCartney	3:29
11.	"The Fool on the Hill (2023 Mix)" (Magical Mystery Tour EP and LP, 1967)		McCartney	3:00
12.	"Magical Mystery Tour (2023 Mix)" (Magical Mystery Tour EP and LP, 1967)		McCartney	2:49
13.	"Lady Madonna (2015 Mix)" (non-album single, 1968)		McCartney	2:18
14.	"Hey Jude (2015 Mix)" (non-album single, 1968)		McCartney	7:11
15.	"Revolution (2023 Mix)" (non-album B-side, 1968)		Lennon	3:21
Total length:				56:18

Disc 2
No.	Title	Writer(s)	Lead vocals	Length
1.	"Back in the U.S.S.R. (2018 Mix)" (from The Beatles, 1968)		McCartney	2:45
2.	"Dear Prudence (2018 Mix)" (from The Beatles, 1968)		Lennon	3:59
3.	"While My Guitar Gently Weeps (2018 Mix)" (from The Beatles, 1968)	Harrison	Harrison	4:46
4.	"Ob-La-Di, Ob-La-Da (2018 Mix)" (from The Beatles, 1968)		McCartney	3:11
5.	"Glass Onion (2018 Mix)" (from The Beatles, 1968)		Lennon	2:19
6.	"Blackbird (2018 Mix)" (from The Beatles, 1968)		McCartney	2:21
7.	"Hey Bulldog (2023 Mix)" (from Yellow Submarine, 1969)		Lennon with McCartney	3:11
8.	"Get Back (2015 Mix)" (non-album single, 1969)		McCartney	3:12
9.	"Don't Let Me Down (2021 Mix)" (non-album B-side, 1969)		Lennon	3:34
10.	"The Ballad of John and Yoko (2015 Mix)" (non-album single, 1969)		Lennon	3:00
11.	"Old Brown Shoe (2023 Mix)" (non-album B-side, 1969)	Harrison	Harrison	3:18
12.	"Here Comes the Sun (2019 Mix)" (from Abbey Road, 1969)	Harrison	Harrison	3:07
13.	"Come Together (2019 Mix)" (from Abbey Road, 1969)		Lennon	4:19
14.	"Something (2019 Mix)" (from Abbey Road, 1969)	Harrison	Harrison	3:03
15.	"Octopus's Garden (2019 Mix)" (from Abbey Road, 1969)	Richard Starkey	Starr	2:52
16.	"Oh! Darling (2019 Mix)" (from Abbey Road, 1969)		McCartney	3:28
17.	"I Want You (She's So Heavy) (2019 Mix)" (from Abbey Road, 1969)		Lennon	7:47
18.	"Let It Be (2021 Mix)" (non-album single, 1970)		McCartney	3:51
19.	"Across the Universe (2021 Mix)" (from Let It Be, 1970)		Lennon	3:49
20.	"I Me Mine (2021 Mix)" (from Let It Be, 1970)	Harrison	Harrison	2:28
21.	"The Long and Winding Road (2021 Mix)" (from Let It Be, 1970)		McCartney	3:37
22.	"Now and Then" (non-album single, 2023)		Lennon with McCartney	4:08
Total length:				79:20

The 2023 Vinyl edition add the additional 9 songs onto a 3rd Disc, having Now and Then, Blackbird, Dear Prudence, Glass Onion and Within You Without You on side 1 and Hey Bulldog, Oh! Darling, I Me Mine and I Want You (She's So Heavy) on side 2.

== Charts ==
=== Weekly charts ===
Original release

Weekly chart performance for 1967–1970 original release
Chart (1973)	Peak position
Australian Kent Music Report	11
Austrian Albums Chart	1
Canadian RPM Albums Chart	3
Dutch Mega Albums Chart	2
Finnish Albums (Suomen virallinen lista)	4
Italian M&D Albums Chart	10
Japanese Oricon LPs Chart	2
Norwegian VG-lista Albums Chart	2
Spanish Albums Chart	1
UK Albums Chart	2
US Billboard Top LPs & Tape	1
West German Media Control Albums Chart	2

1993 reissue

Weekly chart performance for 1967–1970 1993 reissue
Chart (1993–2008)	Peak position
Australian Albums Chart	8
Austrian Albums Chart	3
Belgian Albums Chart (Wallonia)	46
Canadian RPM Albums Chart	11
Dutch Albums Chart	3
Italian M&D Albums Chart	18
Japanese Albums Chart	5
New Zealand Albums Chart	4
Norwegian Albums Chart	8
Swedish Albums Chart	23
Swiss Albums Chart	3
UK Albums Chart	4
US Billboard Top Pop Catalog	1

2010 reissue

Weekly chart performance for 1967–1970 2010 reissue
Chart (2010)	Peak position
Austrian Albums Chart	65
Belgian Albums Chart (Flanders)	30
Belgian Albums Chart (Wallonia)	56
Danish Albums Chart	23
Dutch Mega Albums Chart	55
German Albums Chart	71
Japanese Albums Chart	3
Spanish Albums Chart	19
Swedish Albums Chart	17
Swiss Albums Chart	47
UK Albums Chart	4
US Billboard 200	29
US Billboard Catalog Albums Chart	1

Weekly chart performance for 1967–1970 in the 2020s
Chart (2021–2024)	Peak position
Australian Albums (ARIA)	8
Austrian Albums (Ö3 Austria)	4
Canadian Albums (Billboard)	13
Finnish Albums (Suomen virallinen lista)	50
German Albums (Offizielle Top 100)	5
Greek Albums (Billboard)	4
Hungarian Physical Albums (MAHASZ)	31
Italian Albums (FIMI)	18
Japanese Albums (Oricon)	6
Japanese Combined Albums (Oricon)	6
Japanese Hot Albums (Billboard Japan)	6
New Zealand Albums (RMNZ)	12
Norwegian Albums (VG-lista)	22
Polish Albums (ZPAV)	13
Portuguese Albums (AFP)	38
Spanish Albums (Promusicae)	10
Swedish Albums (Sverigetopplistan)	48
Swiss Albums (Schweizer Hitparade)	3
UK Albums (Official Charts)	2

=== Year-end charts ===
Year-end chart performance for 1967–1970
Chart	Year	Position
Austrian Albums Chart	1973	3
Dutch Albums Chart	1973	10
German Albums Chart	1973	28
Japanese Albums Chart	1973	6
US Billboard Pop Albums	1973	24
Austrian Albums Chart	1974	4
German Albums Chart	1974	2
UK Albums Chart	1974	23
US Billboard Pop Albums	1974	70
German Albums Chart	1975	2
German Albums Chart	1976	4
German Albums Chart	1977	21
German Albums Chart	1978	23
Canadian Albums Chart	1993	82
Dutch Albums Chart	1993	54
Italian Albums Chart	1993	106
Japanese Albums Chart	1993	94
Spanish Albums Chart	1993	12
UK Albums Chart	1993	76
UK Albums (OCC)	2023	89
UK Albums (OCC)	2024	78
US Billboard 200	2024	182
UK Albums (OCC)	2025	60

== Certifications and sales ==
In the US, the album sold 1,294,896 LPs by 31 December 1973 and 5,850,026 LPs by the end of the decade.

Certifications for 1967–1970
Region	Certification	Certified units/sales
Argentina (CAPIF)	Platinum	60,000^{^}
Australia (ARIA)	5× Platinum	350,000^{^}
Austria (IFPI Austria)	3× Platinum	150,000^{*}
Belgium (BRMA)	Platinum	50,000^{*}
Canada (Music Canada)	Diamond	1,000,000^{^}
Denmark (IFPI Danmark)	3× Platinum	60,000^{‡}
France (SNEP)	Platinum	400,000^{*}
France (SNEP) 1993 release	2× Platinum	600,000^{*}
France (SNEP) 2010 remaster	Gold	50,000^{*}
Germany (BVMI)	3× Platinum	1,500,000^{^}
Greece	—	25,000
Italy (FIMI)	Gold	25,000^{*}
Japan (RIAJ)	2× Platinum+Gold	807,000
Netherlands (NVPI)	Gold	50,000^{^}
New Zealand (RMNZ)	4× Platinum	60,000^{^}
Norway (IFPI Norway)	Gold	25,000^{*}
Spain (Promusicae)	2× Platinum	200,000^{^}
Sweden (GLF)	Platinum	100,000^{^}
Switzerland (IFPI Switzerland)	Platinum	50,000^{^}
United Kingdom (BPI) sales since 2010	4× Platinum	1,200,000^{‡}
United States (RIAA)	17× Platinum	8,500,000^{^}
^{*} Sales figures based on certification alone.^{^} Shipments figures based on certification alone.^{‡} Sales+streaming figures based on certification alone.

== See also ==
- Outline of the Beatles
- The Beatles timeline
