= The Ballad of John and Yoko =

- US picture sleeve

Single by the Beatles
- B-side: "Old Brown Shoe"
- Released: 30 May 1969
- Recorded: 14 April 1969
- Studio: EMI, London
- Genre: Rock and roll; folk rock
- Length: 2:59
- Label: Apple
- Songwriter: Lennon–McCartney
- Producer: George Martin

The Beatles singles chronology
"Get Back" (1969)	"The Ballad of John and Yoko" (1969)	"Something" / "Come Together" (1969)

Promotional film
- "The Ballad of John and Yoko" on YouTube

"The Ballad of John and Yoko" is a song by the English rock band the Beatles. It was released as a non-album single in May 1969. Written by John Lennon and credited to the Lennon–McCartney partnership, the song chronicled the events surrounding the wedding of Lennon and Yoko Ono in March 1969. The song was the Beatles' 17th UK number-one single and their last for 54 years until "Now and Then" in 2023. In the United States it was banned by some radio stations because of references in the lyrics to Christ and crucifixion. The single peaked at number 8 on the US Billboard Hot 100. The song has subsequently appeared on compilation albums such as Hey Jude, 1967–1970, Past Masters, and 1.

== Writing ==
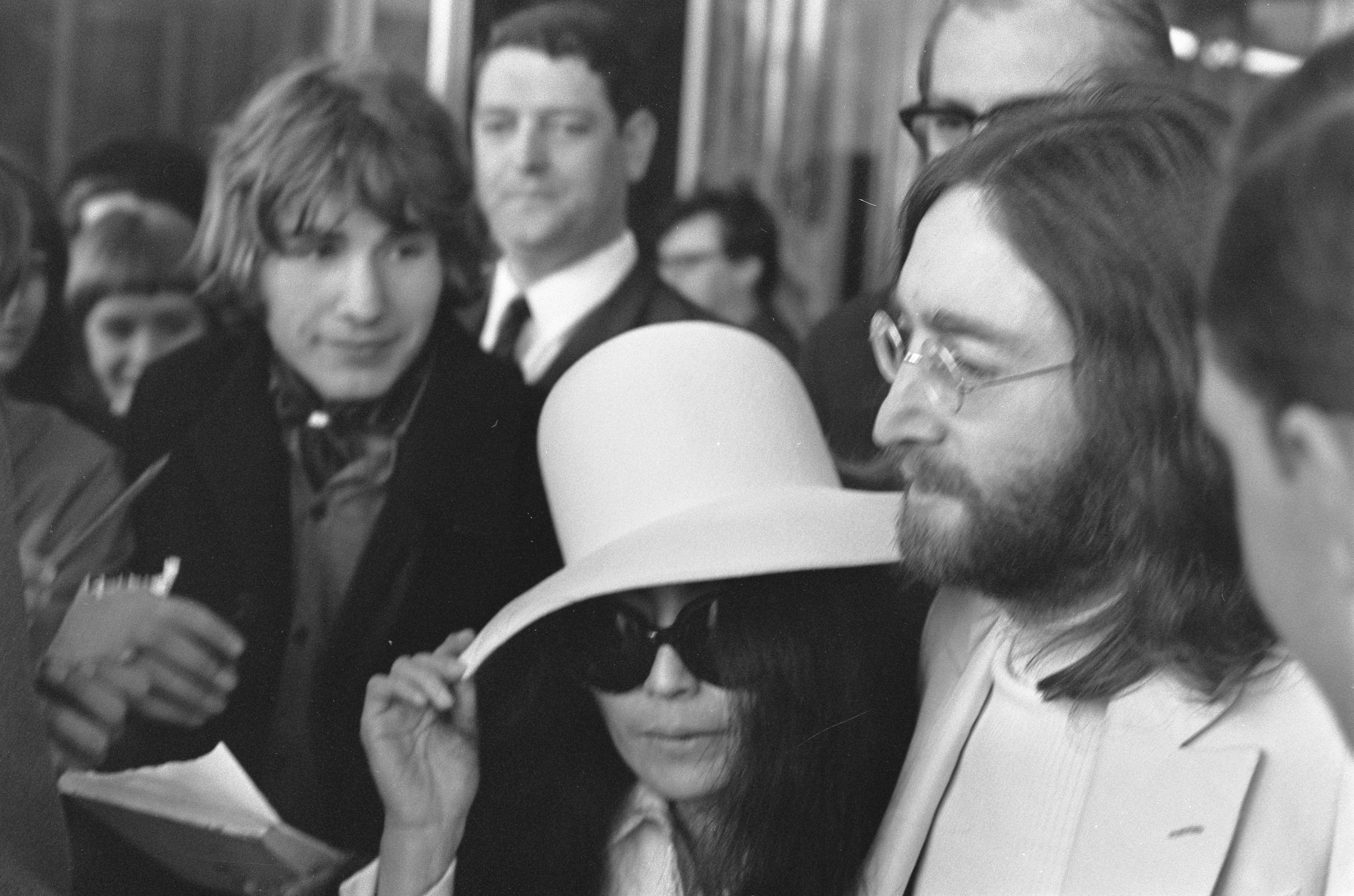
Ono and Lennon leaving Amsterdam in March 1969

Lennon wrote the song while he and Ono were on their honeymoon in Paris. It described the events of the couple's wedding and their highly publicised honeymoon activities, including their "bed-in" at the Amsterdam Hilton Hotel and their demonstration of "bagism". In an interview with Alan Smith of the NME published in May 1969, Lennon described it as "Johnny B. Paperback Writer"; in a 1980 interview, he said it was "a piece of journalism".

Lennon took the song to Paul McCartney at McCartney's home in St John's Wood, London, on 14 April, eager to record it that evening. Recalling the controversy caused by Lennon's "more popular than Jesus" remarks in the US in 1966, McCartney was alarmed by the references to Christ in the new song, but agreed to assist Lennon. Ono said later: "Paul knew that people were being nasty to John, and he just wanted to make it well for him. Paul has a very brotherly side to him."

== Recording ==
Lennon and McCartney recorded the song with producer George Martin at EMI's Abbey Road Studios without their bandmates George Harrison, who was abroad, and Ringo Starr, who was filming The Magic Christian. McCartney recalled that Lennon was so convinced the song had to be recorded immediately that he was "on heat, so to speak". Reflecting the unusual situation, the session tapes include the following exchange:

Lennon (on guitar): "Go a bit faster, Ringo."
McCartney (on drums): "OK, George!"

In choosing to collaborate on the song, Lennon and McCartney set aside the antagonism that had existed between them for a while when McCartney was outvoted in the Beatles' choice of a new manager for their failing business enterprise, Apple Corps. The recording also marked the return of Geoff Emerick as recording engineer at a Beatles session, after he had quit working with the group in July 1968 during the tense White Album sessions. Commenting in the Beatles Anthology book, Harrison said: "I didn't mind not being on the record, because it was none of my business ... If it had been 'The Ballad of John, George and Yoko', then I would have been on it."

Music critic Richie Unterberger commented on the historical significance of the seven-hour session since it produced "probably some of the final tapes of Lennon and McCartney working closely together, alone". In Beatles historian Mark Lewisohn's description, the session tapes challenged the typical reports of Lennon and McCartney's relationship becoming acrimonious in 1969, as the pair's "great talent, humour, musical understanding and togetherness shone through from start to finish".

Mark Hertsgaard of The New Yorker, the only other writer known to have heard the tapes, attended a private listening session in London with Lewisohn in January 1994. Soon afterwards, Hertsgaard wrote that Lewisohn had again enthused about Lennon and McCartney's camaraderie and "musical kinship", but he himself detected "a forced, polite quality to their joking, and none of the enthusiastic electricity heard during earlier Beatles sessions ... They are coming apart, and they know it." (Note: Hertsgaard also described the pair's humour as "subdued, even hollow".)

== Release ==
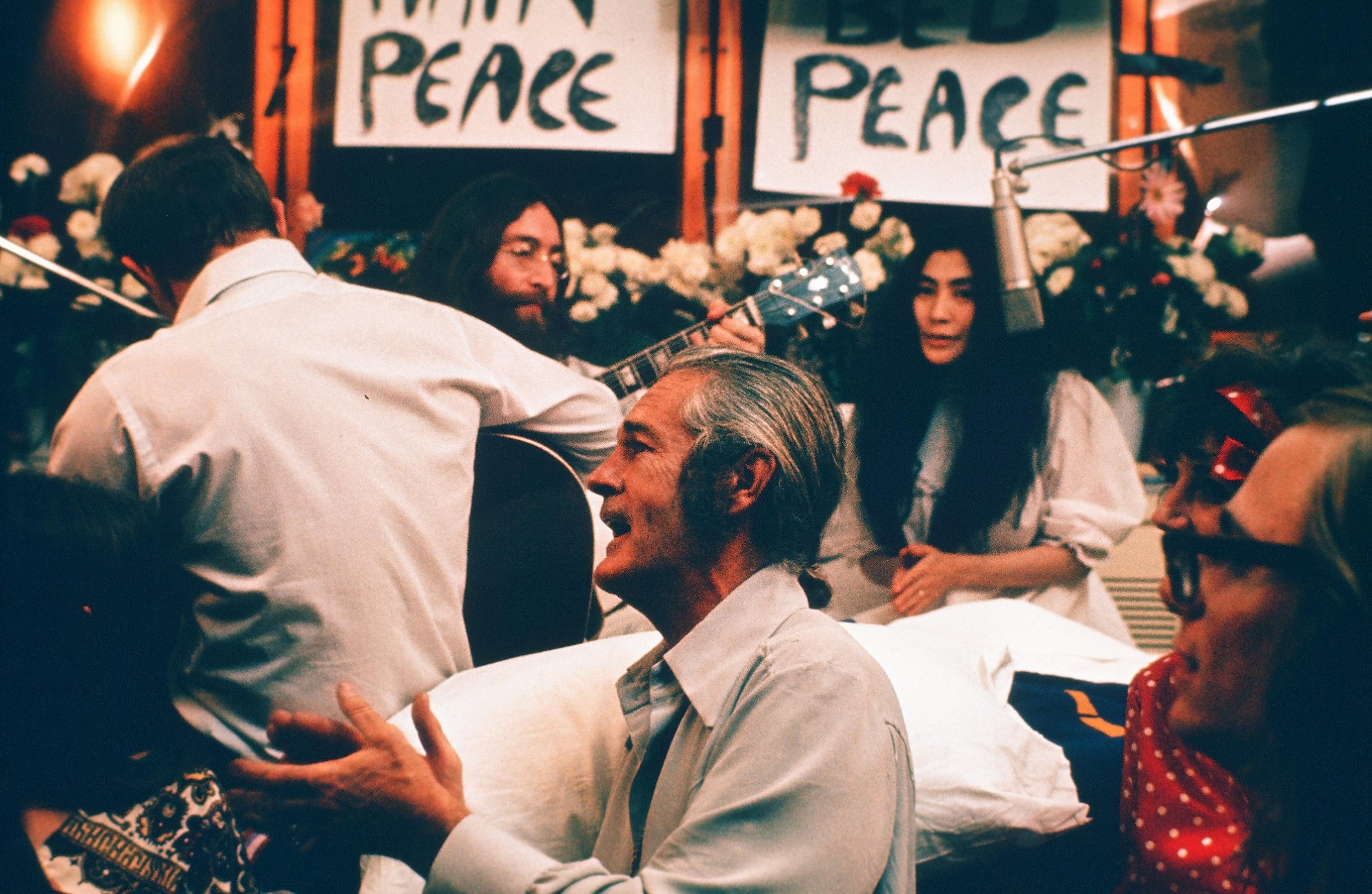
Lennon and Ono during their Montreal bed-in, recording "Give Peace a Chance" with guests including Timothy Leary (foreground)

Lennon was impatient to issue the single but its release was delayed by the Beatles' April 1969 single, "Get Back". Backed with Harrison's "Old Brown Shoe", "The Ballad of John and Yoko" was issued as a single in the UK on 30 May 1969. Lennon and Ono were performing a second bed-in at the Queen Elizabeth Hotel in Montreal at the time. The United States release followed on 4 June.

In the UK and Europe, "The Ballad of John and Yoko" was the first Beatles single to be issued in stereo. It was their first release not given a mono mix. Lennon advised Tony Bramwell, Apple Records' promotions manager, to limit pre-release previews of the record and not to give it any advance publicity, especially with regard to "the 'Christ!' bit". In his NME interview at the time, Lennon said that although the story had already emerged that Harrison and Starr did not play on the song, he would not have chosen to publicise this, adding, "It doesn't mean anything, it just so happened that there were only us two there."

In the US, Apple issued the record in a picture sleeve containing two photos taken by Linda McCartney of the Beatles and Ono in the garden of McCartney's London home. The front of the sleeve showed Lennon and Ono seated with Harrison, McCartney and Starr standing behind them. According to author Bruce Spizer, Lennon's bandmates appeared uncomfortable ceding the spotlight to Ono and in better humour in the shot used for "Old Brown Shoe" on the reverse of the sleeve. (Note: Author Peter Doggett says that the sleeve depicted "all five Beatles". He quotes McCartney as saying: "Yoko used to sit in on the photos, and we didn't really know how to tell her to get out .. You couldn't really say, 'Excuse me, John, can you get her out?'")

The single was accompanied by two promotional clips assembled from footage of some of Lennon and Ono's public activities, all of which the couple routinely filmed, between July 1968 and April 1969. The first clip was broadcast three times on Top of the Pops and contained footage from four events. When shown on the Australian TV show Rage long afterwards, in black and white, this version had the word "Christ" bleeped out in the choruses with an on-screen starburst effect. In the second film, broadcast on the US show The Music Scene, a traffic sign containing an exclamation mark appears each time the word is heard. This film was made with footage from events featuring Lennon and Ono in London, Paris, Amsterdam and Vienna, among other locations. For this reason, according to author John Winn, it "illustrates the lyrics much more effectively" than the first clip.

The song has been included on several compilation albums: Hey Jude (US, 1970), 1967–1970 (1973), 20 Greatest Hits (UK, 1982), Past Masters, Volume Two (1988) and 1 (2000). Apple's electronic press kit for 1 included a new colour print of the US promo clip.

== Reception ==
In his review of the single in the NME, John Wells said he found "The Ballad of John and Yoko" profoundly moving as an account of people's attitude towards Lennon and Ono, and only the "raw, earthy rock" backing stopped him succumbing to tears. He described it as a "stormer" but predicted that the record's sales would be affected by "Get Back"'s ongoing chart success. Cash Box said that "Mixed programmer reaction [to the U.S. single] is the result of 'objectionable' lyrics, but musically the side is an exciting old-Elvis flavored track with other 50's touches."

The single became the Beatles' 17th UK number 1, their last for 54 years until the release of "Now And Then" in 2023. In the US, it peaked at number 8 on the Billboard Hot 100. On other national charts in the US it reached number 10 in Cash Box and number 7 in Record World. Several US radio stations declined to broadcast the song because of the use of the words "Christ" and "crucify" in the chorus:

Christ, you know it ain’t easy
You know how hard it can be
The way things are going
They’re gonna crucify me

"The Ballad of John and Yoko" never appeared on the surveys of WLS in Chicago or WABC in New York, two of the largest Top 40 stations in the US. The word "Christ" was censored (by being "bleeped out") for radio airplay in Australia. The Spanish government under Franco objected to the song because of the phrase "Gibraltar near Spain". The status of Gibraltar is a long-running subject of debate between Spain and the United Kingdom.

When cartoonist Al Capp visited Lennon and Ono at their 1969 Bed-In for Peace in Montreal, he pointedly asked Lennon about the meaning of the song's lyrics. Their testy exchange, which included Capp referring to Ono as "Madame Nhu", later appeared in the 1988 documentary film Imagine: John Lennon. On Capp's exit, Lennon sang an impromptu version with a slightly revised lyric that stated, "They're gonna crucify Capp!"

In 2012, "The Ballad of John and Yoko" was ranked as the 404th best classic rock song of all time by New York's Q104.3. Less impressed, Alex Petridis of The Guardian ranked the song last of the Beatles' 22 UK singles, saying: "John Lennon once convened a meeting of the Beatles to inform them that he was Jesus: the charmless 'Ballad of John and Yoko' is that crazed egotism and messiah complex wrought into song." Rolling Stone ranked it at number 48 on the magazine's list of the 100 greatest Beatles songs.

== Personnel ==
According to Ian MacDonald and Mark Lewisohn:

The Beatles

- John Lennon – lead vocal, lead guitars, acoustic guitar, percussion
- Paul McCartney – bass guitar, drums, piano, maracas, harmony vocal

== Charts ==
=== Weekly charts ===
Chart (1969)	Peak position
Australia (Kent Music Report)	1
Austria (Ö3 Austria Top 40)	1
Belgium (Ultratop 50 Flanders)	1
Canada RPM Top Singles	7
Finland (Suomen virallinen lista)	8
Ireland (IRMA)	1
Italy (Musica e Dischi)	10
Netherlands (Single Top 100)	1
New Zealand (Listener)	2
Norway (VG-lista)	1
Sweden (Kvällstoppen)	2
Sweden (Tio i Topp)	2
Switzerland (Schweizer Hitparade)	1
UK Singles (Official Charts)	1
US Billboard Hot 100	8
US Cash Box Top 100	10
US Record World 100 Top Pops	7
West German Media Control Singles Chart	1

=== Year-end charts ===
Chart (1969)	Rank
Switzerland	7
UK	16

== Certifications and sales ==
Region	Certification	Certified units/sales
France	—	150,000
United Kingdom	—	300,000
United States (RIAA)	Gold	1,250,000
Summaries
Worldwide	—	2,500,000

== Sources ==
- The Beatles (2000). The Beatles Anthology. San Francisco, CA: Chronicle Books. ISBN 0-8118-2684-8.
- Doggett, Peter (2011). You Never Give Me Your Money: The Beatles After the Breakup. New York, NY: It Books. ISBN 978-0-06-177418-8.
- Greene, Doyle (2016). Rock, Counterculture and the Avant-Garde, 1966–1970: How the Beatles, Frank Zappa and the Velvet Underground Defined an Era. Jefferson, NC: McFarland. ISBN 978-1-4766-6214-5.
- Guesdon, Jean-Michel; Margotin, Philippe (2013). All the Songs: The Story Behind Every Beatles Release. New York, NY: Black Dog & Leventhal. ISBN 978-1-57912-952-1.
- Lewisohn, Mark (2005) [1988]. The Complete Beatles Recording Sessions: The Official Story of the Abbey Road Years 1962–1970. London: Bounty Books. ISBN 978-0-7537-2545-0.
- MacDonald, Ian (1998). Revolution in the Head: The Beatles' Records and the Sixties. London: Pimlico. ISBN 978-0-7126-6697-8.
- Miles, Barry (2001). The Beatles Diary Volume 1: The Beatles Years. London: Omnibus Press. ISBN 0-7119-8308-9.
- Spizer, Bruce (2003). The Beatles on Apple Records. New Orleans, LA: 498 Productions. ISBN 0-9662649-4-0.
- Sutherland, Steve, ed. (2003). NME Originals: Lennon. London: IPC Ignite!.
- Unterberger, Richie (2006). The Unreleased Beatles: Music & Film. San Francisco, CA: Backbeat Books. ISBN 978-0-87930-892-6.
- Wallgren, Mark (1982). The Beatles on Record. New York: Simon & Schuster. ISBN 0-671-45682-2.
- Winn, John C. (2009). That Magic Feeling: The Beatles' Recorded Legacy, Volume Two, 1966–1970. New York, NY: Three Rivers Press. ISBN 978-0-307-45239-9.
- Womack, Kenneth (2014). The Beatles Encyclopedia: Everything Fab Four. Santa Barbara, CA: ABC-CLIO. ISBN 978-0-313-39171-2.
