= Monte Fresco =

British photojournalist

Monte Fresco (photographer)
- Born: 14 February 1936; East End, London UK
- Died: 5 December 2013 (aged 77)
- Known for: Photography,
- Notable work: MBE (1995), British Sports Journalists Association Lifetime Achievement Award (1995), Sports Photographer of the Year

Monte Fresco MBE (14 February 1936 – 5 December 2013) was an English photographer known for humorous photographs of sporting events. He covered seven World Cups, many European Championships and more than 40 FA Cup Finals, and Wimbledon Championships.

He said in an interview:

What makes a great football picture? Being in the right place with the right lens and... luck! After a working lifetime in sport for a national newspaper, with 80% of my time spent concentrating on football, I know that I have been very, very lucky. For me it was always about 'Incidents'. I was always looking for an incident that had gone unnoticed, something off the ball, something to make the reader stop and take a second look and think "I didn't see that!"
