= Lady Madonna =

- US picture sleeve

Single by the Beatles
- B-side: "The Inner Light"
- Released: 15 March 1968
- Recorded: 3 and 6 February 1968
- Studio: EMI, London
- Genre: Pop rock; rhythm and blues; rock and roll; boogie-woogie
- Length: 2:16
- Label: Parlophone (UK); Capitol (US)
- Songwriter: Lennon–McCartney
- Producer: George Martin

The Beatles singles chronology
"Hello, Goodbye" (1967)	"Lady Madonna" (1968)	"Hey Jude" (1968)

Promotional film
- "Lady Madonna" on YouTube

"Lady Madonna" is a song by the English rock band the Beatles, written primarily by Paul McCartney and credited to Lennon–McCartney. In March 1968, it was released as a mono non-album single backed with "The Inner Light". The song was recorded on 3 and 6 February 1968 before the Beatles left for India, and its style drawing from boogie-woogie signalled a more conventional approach to writing and recording for the band, following the psychedelic experimentation of the previous two years.

This single was the last release by the band on Parlophone in the United Kingdom, where it reached number 1 for the two weeks beginning 27 March, and Capitol Records in the United States, where it debuted at number 23 on the Billboard Hot 100 for the week ending 23 March and reached number 4 from the week ending 20 April through the week ending 4 May. Subsequent releases, starting with "Hey Jude" in August 1968, were released on their own label, Apple Records, under EMI distribution, until the late 1970s, when Capitol and Parlophone re-released old material. The song's first album appearance in stereo was on the North American collection Hey Jude compilation, released in 1970, and on the global market collection 1967–1970, released in 1973.

== Inspiration ==
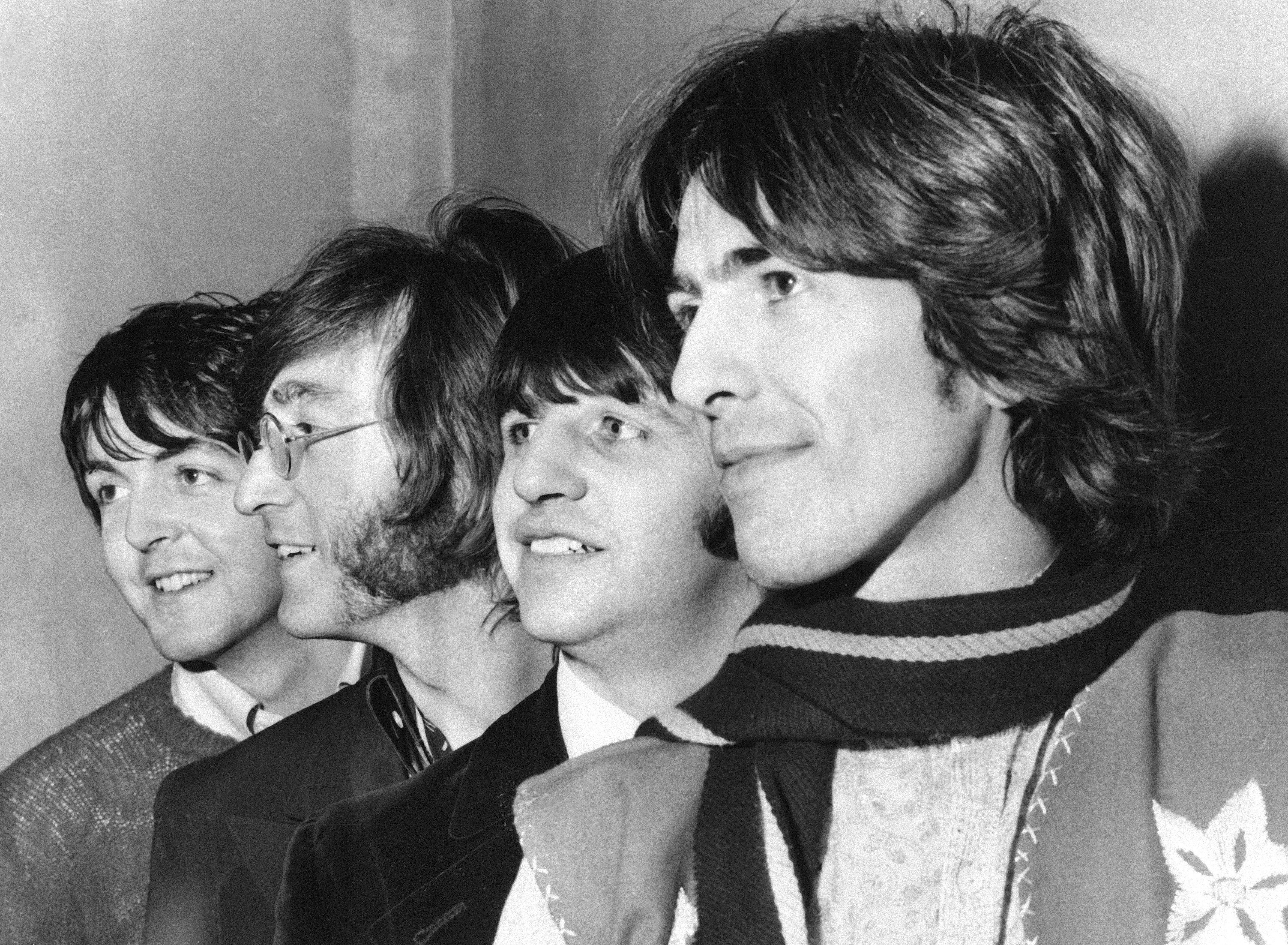
The photo session for the single cover took place on February 8, 1968

In the description of musicologist Walter Everett, "Lady Madonna" is a "raucous rock and roll" song. As such, it heralded the Beatles' return to a more standard form of songwriting after their recent psychedelic productions, a back-to-basics approach that many other artists pursued throughout 1968. According to one of Paul McCartney's neighbours at his farm in Scotland, McCartney previewed the song on a piano during a visit he and Jane Asher made from London in early December 1967. Author Jonathan Gould views the timing as propitious, since the British music press in early 1968 "[began] to tout the idea of a 'rock-and-roll revival' as a corrective to the excesses of psychedelia".

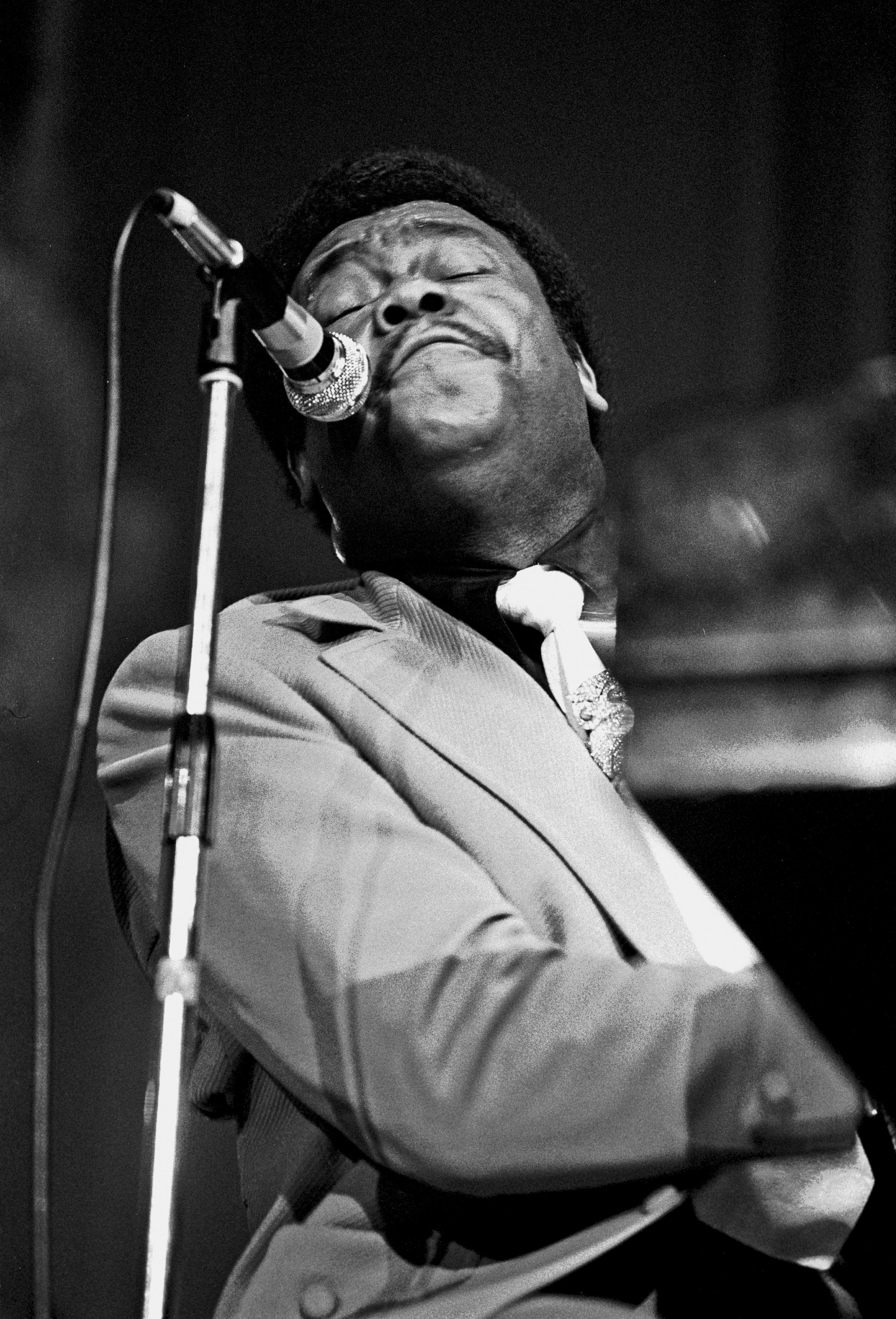
Fats Domino performing in Hamburg in 1973

McCartney based his piano part for the song on Humphrey Lyttelton's trad jazz rendition of "Bad Penny Blues", which was released on the Parlophone record label in 1956, soon after George Martin, the Beatles' producer, had taken over as head of the label. McCartney recalled: "'Lady Madonna' was me sitting down at the piano trying to write a bluesy boogie-woogie thing ... It reminded me of Fats Domino for some reason, so I started singing a Fats Domino impression. It took my other voice to a very odd place." Domino's 1956 hit "Blue Monday" conveys the plight of a working man through each day of the week, while "Lady Madonna" does the same from a female perspective.

John Lennon helped write the lyrics, which give an account of an overworked, exhausted and possibly single mother facing a new problem each day of the week. McCartney explained the song by saying: "'Lady Madonna' started off as the Virgin Mary, then it was a working-class woman, of which obviously there's millions in Liverpool. There are a lot of Catholics in Liverpool because of the Irish connection." The lyrics include each day of the week except Saturday, which McCartney only noticed many years later: "I was writing the words out to learn it for an American TV show and I realised I missed out Saturday ... So I figured it must have been a real night out." McCartney said his inspiration for the song came after seeing a photograph in National Geographic magazine of a woman breastfeeding, titled "Mountain Madonna".

Speaking later about "Lady Madonna", Lennon said that it had a "[g]ood piano lick, but the song never really went anywhere", adding: "Maybe I helped him on some of the lyrics, but I'm not proud of them either way." Author Howard Sounes identifies both a relevance to McCartney's Catholic upbringing, and an autobiographical quality that belies the song's upbeat melody and delivery. He writes: "the lyric is also tender and personal, evoking the image of Mary McCartney as midwife, tending mothers and their babies in Liverpool as she had during Paul's childhood. The phrase 'Lady Madonna' also has a clear Christian meaning, of course, conflating Paul's memory of his mother with the Virgin Mary in what is a boogie-woogie hymn."

== Recording ==
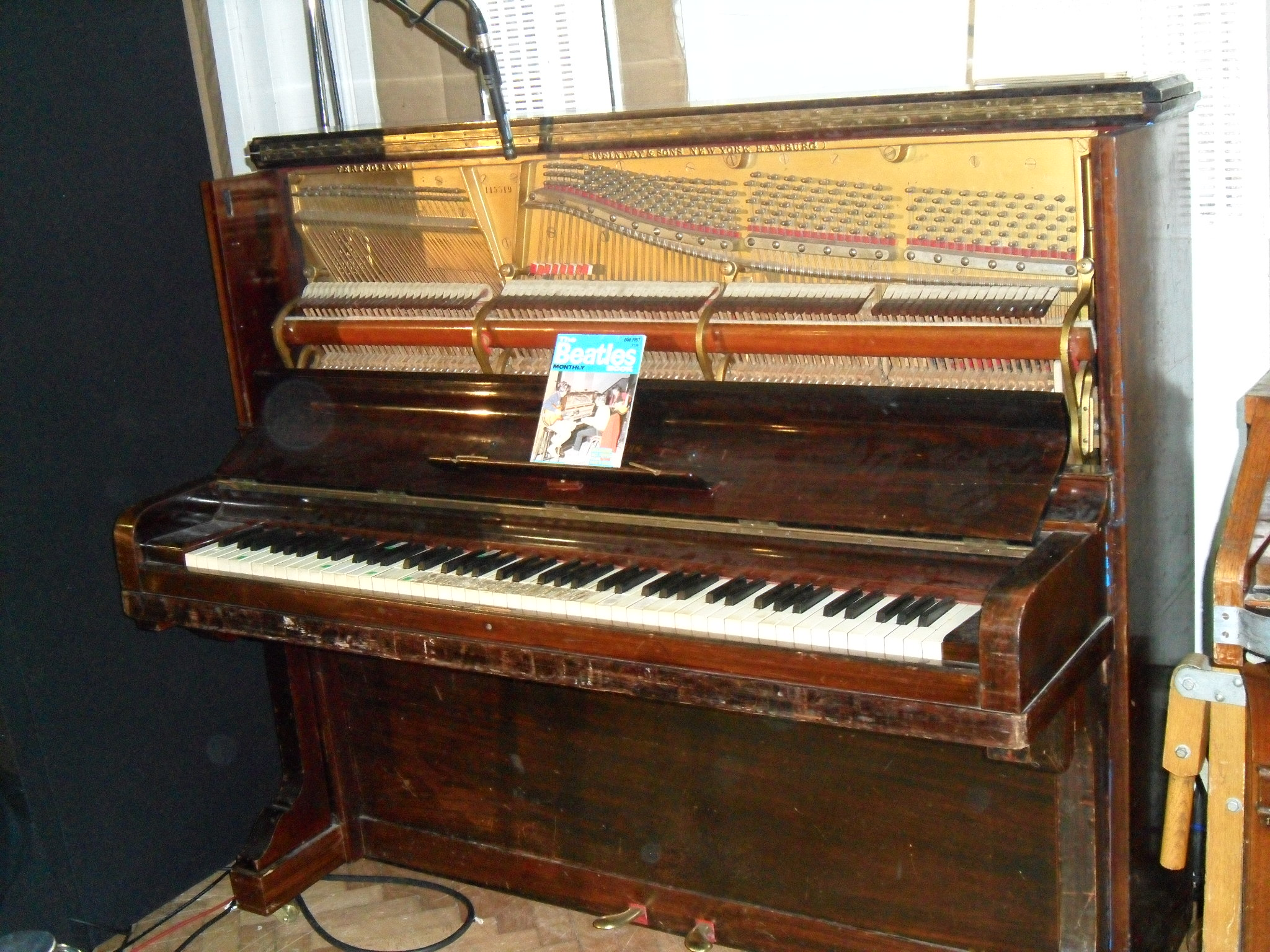
The 1905 Vertegrand piano used by McCartney on "Lady Madonna"

The release of "Lady Madonna" alongside "The Inner Light" was intended to cover the Beatles' absence while they attended a Transcendental Meditation course in India under the guidance of Maharishi Mahesh Yogi. The sessions took place on 3 and 6 February at EMI Studios (subsequently Abbey Road Studios) in London. Although the song was a return to the Beatles' musical roots, this aesthetic was not carried over to the band taping the basic track as an ensemble. McCartney first recorded his piano part, using EMI's "Mrs Mills" Steinway Vertegrand upright, accompanied by Ringo Starr playing a snare drum with brushes. Starr recalled that when recording the track the Beatles consulted Martin on how to recreate the sound that Lyttelton had achieved on "Bad Penny Blues". (Note: "Bad Penny Blues" was produced by Joe Meek rather than Martin, who had clashed with Lyttelton at a session in the early 1950s.) George Harrison and Lennon added the song's distorted guitar riffs, playing identical lines through the same amplifier; McCartney overdubbed bass guitar and Starr added more drums, played on a full drum kit. McCartney sang his lead vocal in a style that author Ian MacDonald terms Presleyesque, while Lennon, McCartney and Harrison contributed backing vocals, part of which consisted of the singers imitating brass instruments over the song's instrumental break. Music journalist John Harris identified the influence of the Mills Brothers, whose act included the four singers mimicking brass instruments, on the Beatles' scat singing harmonies on "Lady Madonna". Early mixes of the song indicate that Mellotron and tambourine were cut from the completed track, along with extraneous vocals and dialogue where the band had been in high spirits during the sessions.

The overdubbing session for the four-piece horn section took place on 6 February. The tenor saxophone solo on the track was played by British jazz musician and club owner Ronnie Scott. Harry Klein, who played baritone saxophone on the track, recalled that the session was organised at the last minute, while Bill Povey, the second tenor saxophonist, said that no music had been written out for the musicians to follow and McCartney offered them only vague instructions. The second baritone saxophone was played by Bill Jackman. In his book Revolution in the Head, MacDonald writes that Scott's "audibly exasperated" solo was prompted by McCartney's "unprofessional" failure to provide the players with a proper horn arrangement.

The song's selection as the single's A-side came at the expense of Lennon's "Across the Universe", which Lennon also withdrew from contention as the B-side, since he was dissatisfied with the musical arrangement. As a result, Harrison gained his first Beatles B-side as a songwriter, with "The Inner Light", the backing track of which he had recorded with several Indian classical musicians in Bombay, in January.

== Promotional films ==
McCartney and Lennon in the "Lady Madonna" promotional film

The Beatles made two promotional films for "Lady Madonna", which were syndicated to television broadcasting companies. The material was shot on 11 February 1968 at EMI Studios and was distributed by NEMS Enterprises to US and UK TV stations. Tony Bramwell directed the two films.

Although the intention had been to show the Beatles miming to the single, the band decided at the last minute that they wanted to use the time to record a new song' the footage then consisted of the Beatles recording Lennon's "Hey Bulldog", which became the last of the four new songs they supplied United Artists for use in the Yellow Submarine animated film. Little attempt was made to marry up the footage of the Beatles' playing and singing with the audio of "Lady Madonna", where in the second of the two clips, Harrison is shown eating a plate of beans, while both clips show Starr listening to a playback and the Beatles playing alternative instruments from those heard on the song. The promos also included footage of McCartney at Chappell Studios in November 1967, from a session he produced for Cilla Black's single "Step Inside Love".

A new edit of the footage, together with footage from the band's July 1968 rehearsals of "Hey Jude", was assembled for "Lady Madonna"'s segment in The Beatles Anthology in 1995. In 1999, the footage was again reedited by Apple, but this time to create a new music video for "Hey Bulldog" that synchronized it with the song, to help promote the reissue of the Yellow Submarine film.

== Release and reception ==
I describe it as "rock-as-swing". We've been trying to make a decent rock'n'roll record ever since we started, and as far as I know, we haven't done a decent one yet. This is another bash; it's pretty near it.

— Ringo Starr, 1968

In Britain, Parlophone issued "Lady Madonna" backed by "The Inner Light" on 15 March 1968, with the catalogue number R 5675. The single was released three days later in the United States, as Capitol 2138. One of the promo clips was aired by the BBC on the 14 March edition of Top of the Pops and then on Alan Freeman's All Systems Freeman the following day, and in the US on ABC-TV's The Hollywood Palace on 30 March. In Everett's description, the single was "at the forefront of a spring–summer 1968 rock-and-roll revival in the United Kingdom", which included UK-exclusive reissues of singles by Gene Vincent, Carl Perkins, Jerry Lee Lewis, Buddy Holly and Little Richard.

Among contemporary reviews of the single, Billboard magazine described "Lady Madonna" as a "powerful blues rocker" while Cash Box's reviewer wrote: "Take one step back, the Beatles ease their progressive pace with this knocking rhythm side that features Ringo Starr in a rare vocal showing with hard-rock and kazoo orking and lyrics that view working class hardship with a pinch of salt." (Note: Many listeners mistook McCartney's Presley-style vocal for Starr. On his return from India, Starr commented: "Yes, a lot of people did. It didn't sound like me to me.") Record World said it "is terrific rock and roll and pungent social comment." Chris Welch of Melody Maker expressed doubts about the song, saying: "Best bit is the piano intro, then you can have fun wondering why Paul['s singing] sounds like Ringo … then go out and buy another record." Welch concluded: "I can't really see this being a hit, not when there's competition from the likes of Four Jacks and a Jill and Kay Starr." Time magazine recognised the Beatles as the leaders of an "upsurge" of renewed interest in 1950s rock 'n' roll and said that the band had re-engaged with the "simple hard-driving style they left behind in Liverpool". Author Bernard Gendron, paraphrasing a contention of the Time writers – who he says were ahead of the US rock press in recognising this trend – writes that by preceding the Rolling Stones' "similarly retrospective 'Jumpin' Jack Flash'", "Lady Madonna" was possibly "the first single by an elite rock band to signal the 'return to roots'".

"Lady Madonna" topped the Record Retailer chart (subsequently adopted as the UK Singles Chart) for two weeks, although on the national chart compiled by Melody Maker it peaked at number 2. It was the first single by the Beatles not to make number 1 on Melody Maker's chart since the band's 1962 debut, "Love Me Do". (Note: The song topped the NME's Top 30 on 27 March, its second week on that chart.) In America, "Lady Madonna" peaked at number 4 on the Billboard Hot 100, making it the first Beatles single not to top that chart since "Eleanor Rigby" in 1966, and number 2 on the Cash Box Top 100. Ian MacDonald considers this relative lack of success to be significant, and he described the song as "a moderately entertaining let-down after the psychedelic heights of early 1967". In Jonathan Gould's opinion, the song is a "witty, powerful, yet willfully inconsequential track" with "all the makings of a classic Beatle B-side", whereas ideally the lead side of the single should have been a Lennon composition. (Note: Referring to his song "Glass Onion", which he began writing in India, Lennon said that the line "The walrus was Paul" was intended to acknowledge McCartney for his efforts in "holding us together". Among its references to several past Beatles songs, the lyrics mention "Lady Madonna trying to make ends meet".) Rob Sheffield of Rolling Stone considers that, at this stage in their career, "the Beatles didn't need to push – they could have hit #1 with a tape of themselves blowing their noses", which, he suggests, "would have been catchier" than "Lady Madonna" and the band's previous single, "Hello, Goodbye". Music critic Tim Riley has similarly dismissed the song as a "trifle" and "something they could do with their left hand".

Writing in 1988, Beatles historian Mark Lewisohn described "Lady Madonna" as a "terrific" single that was "curiously overlooked today by those analysing the group's output". In his song review for AllMusic, Richie Unterberger attributes its standing as one of the band's less-celebrated singles partly to its failure to match the chart success usually associated with the Beatles, but he considers it an "excellent song". He adds that the lyrics, in their implication of the protagonist as a prostitute, are "more intriguing than anything Fats Domino was likely to come up with", while the Beatles' imitation of brass instruments was done "effectively and wittily". Writing for Mojo in 2003, John Harris bemoaned that the song was overlooked as a key recording in the Beatles' development and "one of the foundation stones" for the late 1960s "roots-rock revival". He identified it as the precedent for the Rolling Stones' return to form on Beggars Banquet, for Eric Clapton to exchange Cream's "virtuoso head-rock" for a musical path that resulted in the formation of Derek and the Dominos, and for Chuck Berry and Little Richard to assume "the rarified pedestals where the British Invasion groups had originally placed them". (Note: Walter Everett writes that in addition to inaugurating pop music's "rock and roll revival", "Lady Madonna" anticipated the Beatles' formal attempt to re-engage with their teenage influences – namely, their January 1969 Get Back rehearsals.) In 2010, Rolling Stone ranked "Lady Madonna" at number 86 on its list of "The 100 Greatest Beatles Songs".

== Other releases ==
The Beatles' version of "Lady Madonna" has appeared on the following compilation albums, released by Apple Records: Hey Jude (1970), 1967–1970 (1973), 20 Greatest Hits (1982), Past Masters, Volume Two (1988), Anthology 2 (1996; takes 3 and 4 of the song), 1 (2000) and Love (2006). The mix used in the 1968 single had obscured much of Ronnie Scott's saxophone; the versions subsequently issued on Anthology 2 and Love feature a more prominent use of his solo, at the end of the song. In the BBC documentary Timewatch, McCartney explained that Scott had not been impressed that his playing had been hidden behind the "imitation brass vocals" performed by McCartney, Lennon and Harrison, so McCartney had decided to fix it with the most recent mix. The Love version incorporates the percussion intro from "Why Don't We Do It in the Road?", the piano from "Ob-La-Di, Ob-La-Da", the guitar riff from "Hey Bulldog", Billy Preston's organ solo from "I Want You (She's So Heavy)" and Eric Clapton's guitar solo from "While My Guitar Gently Weeps"..

Having been averse to performing compositions from the Beatles era following the band's break-up in 1970, McCartney included "Lady Madonna" in the set list for his and Wings' 1975–76 world tour. He continued to feature the song on many of his subsequent tours. Live versions appear on the albums Wings over America, Paul Is Live, Back in the U.S., Back in the World and Good Evening New York City. A variation of the song can be heard on his Chaos and Creation at Abbey Road DVD, where McCartney calls it "an old lady in new clothes".

== Cover versions ==
- Fats Domino covered the song on his 1968 album Fats Is Back. McCartney says he may have told record producer Richard Perry that the song was "based on Fats", leading to Domino's version. Also released as a single, Domino's recording peaked at number 100 on the Billboard 100 in September 1968, giving the singer his 77th and final US chart hit.
- Romanian band Phoenix performed this song on their first EP, Vremuri ("Old times", 1968), because the Electrecord studios did not trust the sales success of the band's own songs ("Vremuri" and "Canarul"). This was a common practice in communist countries and the predominant way western music was reaching there officially.
- Elvis Presley covered the song in 1971. Presley's version was an impromptu studio jam that was not available until the release of his 1995 box set Walk a Mile in My Shoes. Harris writes that, just as Domino's cover "confirm[ed] Lady Madonna's rock 'n' roll credentials", Presley's performance served as "the greatest accolade".
- A cover version of the song performed by Aretha Franklin was used as the theme song for the ABC sitcom Grace Under Fire from 1993 until 1996.

== Personnel ==
According to Ian MacDonald:

The Beatles

- Paul McCartney – double-tracked lead vocal, piano, bass guitar, handclaps
- John Lennon – backing vocal, lead guitar, handclaps
- George Harrison – backing vocal, lead guitar, handclaps
- Ringo Starr – drums, drums (with brushes), handclaps

Additional musicians and production

- Ronnie Scott – tenor saxophone
- Bill Povey – tenor saxophone
- Harry Klein – baritone saxophone
- Bill Jackman – baritone saxophone

== Charts ==
=== Weekly charts ===
Chart (1968)	Peak position
Australian Go-Set National Top 40	1
Austrian Singles Chart	1
Belgian Singles Chart	3
Canadian CHUM Hit Parade	1
Canadian RPM 100	2
Dutch Singles Chart	1
Irish Singles Chart	3
Italy M&D Singles Chart	9
New Zealand Listener Chart	1
Finland (Suomen virallinen lista)	7
Norwegian VG-lista Singles	2
Rhodesia Lyons Maid Chart	6
Swedish Kvällstoppen Chart	1
Swedish Tio i Topp Chart	1
Swiss Hitparade	1
UK Record Retailer Chart	1
US Billboard Hot 100	4
US Cash Box Top 100	2
US Record World 100 Top Pops	2
West German Musikmarkt Hit-Parade	2

=== Year-end charts ===
Chart (1968)	Rank
Australian Go-Set Singles	32
Austrian Singles	3
Belgian Singles	31
Canadian RPM Year-End	19
Dutch Singles	45
Switzerland	4
US Billboard	60

== Certifications and sales ==
Region	Certification	Certified units/sales
France	—	200,000
United Kingdom	—	250,000
United States (RIAA)	Platinum	1,000,000^{^}
^{^} Shipments figures based on certification alone.

== Sources ==
- Babiuk, Andy (2002). Beatles Gear: All the Fab Four's Instruments, from Stage to Studio. San Francisco, CA: Backbeat Books. ISBN 978-0-87930-731-8.
- Brackett, Nathan; Hoard, Christian, eds. (2004). The New Rolling Stone Album Guide (4th edn). New York, NY: Fireside/Simon & Schuster. ISBN 0-7432-0169-8.
- Castleman, Harry; Podrazik, Walter J. (1976). All Together Now: The First Complete Beatles Discography 1961–1975. New York, NY: Ballantine Books. ISBN 0-345-25680-8.
- Gilliland, John (1969). "Show 54 – Hail, Hail, Rock 'n' Roll: Getting back to rock's funky, essential essence. (Part 3)" (audio). Pop Chronicles. University of North Texas Libraries.
- Everett, Walter (1999). The Beatles as Musicians: Revolver Through the Anthology. New York, NY: Oxford University Press. ISBN 0-19-988093-X.
- Gendron, Bernard (2002). Between Montmartre and the Mudd Club: Popular Music and the Avant-Garde. Chicago, IL: University of Chicago Press. ISBN 978-0-226-28737-9.
- Gould, Jonathan (2007). Can't Buy Me Love: The Beatles, Britain and America. London: Piatkus. ISBN 978-0-7499-2988-6.
- The History of Rock 1968. London: Time Inc. 2015.
- Ingham, Chris (2006). The Rough Guide to the Beatles (2nd edn). London: Rough Guides/Penguin. ISBN 978-1-84836-525-4.
- Lewisohn, Mark (2005) [1988]. The Complete Beatles Recording Sessions: The Official Story of the Abbey Road Years 1962–1970. London: Bounty Books. ISBN 978-0-7537-2545-0.
- MacDonald, Ian (1998). Revolution in the Head: The Beatles' Records and the Sixties (1st rev. ed.). London: Pimlico. ISBN 0-7126-6697-4.
- Miles, Barry (1997). Paul McCartney: Many Years from Now. New York, NY: Henry Holt & Company. ISBN 0-8050-5249-6.
- Miles, Barry (2001). The Beatles Diary Volume 1: The Beatles Years. London: Omnibus Press. ISBN 0-7119-8308-9.
- Mojo Special Limited Edition: 1000 Days of Revolution (The Beatles' Final Years – Jan 1, 1968 to Sept 27, 1970). London: Emap. 2003.
- Schaffner, Nicholas (1978). The Beatles Forever. New York, NY: McGraw-Hill. ISBN 0-07-055087-5.
- Sheff, David (2000) [1981]. All We Are Saying: The Last Major Interview with John Lennon and Yoko Ono. New York: St. Martin's Press. ISBN 0-312-25464-4.
- Sounes, Howard (2010). Fab: An Intimate Life of Paul McCartney. London: HarperCollins. ISBN 978-0-00-723705-0.
- Unterberger, Richie (2006). The Unreleased Beatles: Music & Film. San Francisco, CA: Backbeat Books. ISBN 978-0-8793-0892-6.
- Winn, John C. (2009). That Magic Feeling: The Beatles' Recorded Legacy, Volume Two, 1966–1970. New York, NY: Three Rivers Press. ISBN 978-0-3074-5239-9.
- Womack, Kenneth (2014). The Beatles Encyclopedia: Everything Fab Four. Santa Barbara, CA: ABC-CLIO. ISBN 978-0-313-39171-2.
