= List of songs recorded by the Beatles =

Songs by English band

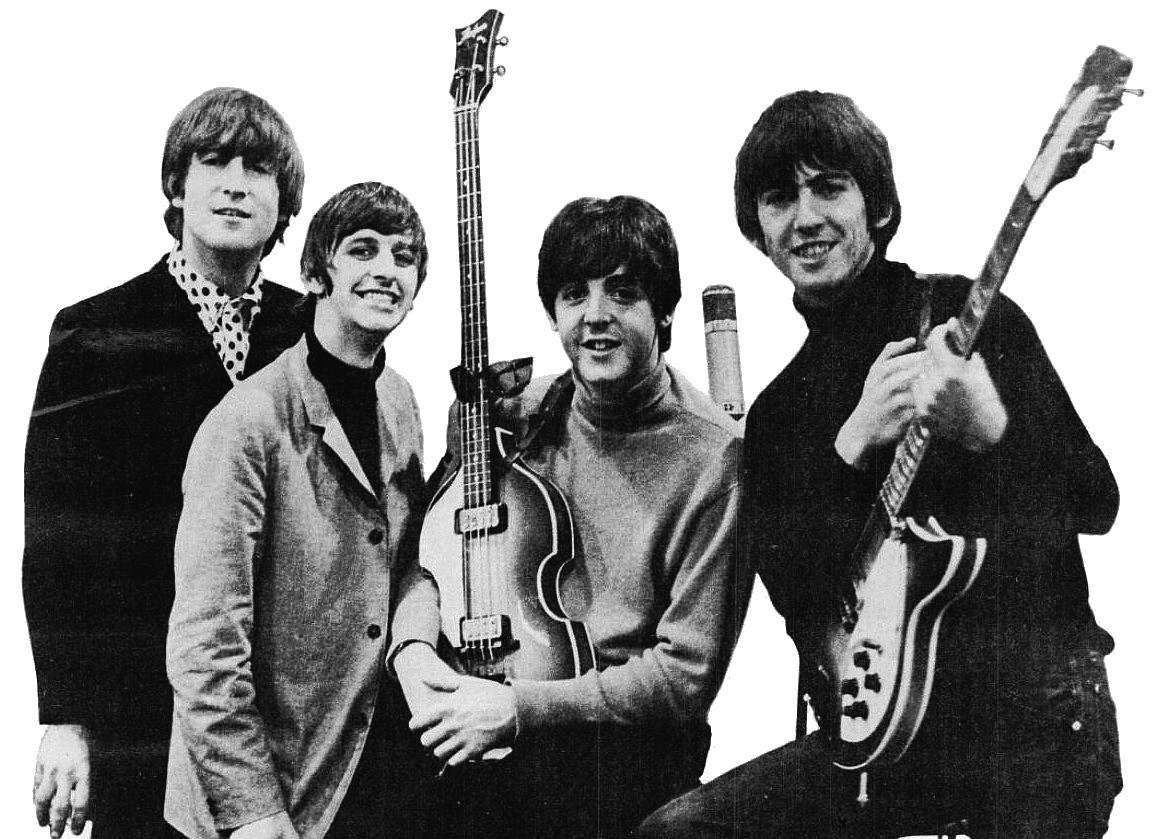
The Beatles in 1965; from left to right: John Lennon, Ringo Starr, Paul McCartney and George Harrison.

The Beatles were an English rock band from Liverpool who recorded hundreds of songs during their career. The group's "main catalogue"—songs released between 1962 and 1970—consists of 213 songs (four of which exist in different versions): 188 originals and 25 covers. Since their break-up, over 100 more songs by the group have been officially released, including live songs the group never recorded in the studio and numerous outtakes. The band also recorded several songs that remain unreleased. Often considered the most influential band of the rock era, the group's music pioneered new recording techniques and was primarily responsible for pop music's evolution into an art form. The majority of their recordings were produced by George Martin, who also played and composed string arrangements on multiple songs; his influence on the group led him to be referred to as the "Fifth Beatle". Between 1962 and 1968, the Beatles released their songs in both mono and stereo versions; Abbey Road and Let It Be were mixed and released only in stereo. Their songs often featured differences between the mixes and the group put the most effort into making the mono mixes. All mono mixes were remastered and released on The Beatles in Mono box set in 2009, along with the remastering of the band's entire catalogue in stereo.

Following their signing with EMI in 1962, each member of the Beatles contributed to songwriting. Their primary songwriters were the partnership of John Lennon and Paul McCartney, who composed most of the group's songs; lead guitarist George Harrison wrote 22 songs, including "While My Guitar Gently Weeps", "Something" and "Here Comes the Sun", while drummer Ringo Starr wrote two songs ("Don't Pass Me By" and "Octopus's Garden"), and was credited as co-writer for four others. (Note: These consist of "Dig It", the instrumental "Flying", "Maggie Mae" and "What Goes On".) While songs written by Lennon or McCartney were always credited to "Lennon–McCartney", (Note: This was due to an agreement the two made before the Beatles became famous.) the pair wrote many songs completely separately. These include "Come Together", "Strawberry Fields Forever" and "Nowhere Man" (Lennon) and "Hey Jude", "Let It Be" and "Yesterday" (McCartney), the last of which is one of the most covered songs of all time. Artists the band covered while together included Chuck Berry ("Roll Over Beethoven", "Rock and Roll Music"), Carl Perkins ("Matchbox", "Honey Don't"), Larry Williams ("Slow Down", "Dizzy Miss Lizzy") and Little Richard ("Long Tall Sally"). Cover songs were included on five of the band's core albums: Please Please Me and With the Beatles (both 1963), Beatles for Sale (1964), Help! (1965) and Let It Be (1970). Lead vocals were also shared by the group, with Starr usually contributing vocals to one song per album. The group were known for their harmonies, mostly two-part, but sang intricate three-part harmonies on "This Boy", "Yes It Is" and "Because".

Originally rooted in skiffle and 1950s rock and roll music, the group embraced pop music in their early years ("She Loves You", "I Want to Hold Your Hand"), but began to branch out into different genres, including folk rock (Help!, Rubber Soul), country ("Act Naturally", "Don't Pass Me By") and psychedelia (Sgt. Pepper's Lonely Hearts Club Band, Magical Mystery Tour). Their 1968 self-titled album (also known as the "White Album") in particular featured a wide range of styles, including ska ("Ob-La-Di, Ob-La-Da"), blues ("Yer Blues"), hard rock ("Helter Skelter" and the single version of "Revolution"), and a musique concrète sound collage ("Revolution 9"). The group also composed numerous ballads, including "Michelle" and "The Long and Winding Road". During their career, the Beatles introduced more innovations into popular music than any other rock band of the 20th century. Some of these include one of the first uses of guitar feedback in music ("I Feel Fine"), the first use of a fade-in in a pop song ("Eight Days a Week"), use of tape loops ("Tomorrow Never Knows"), using the recording studio as an instrument (Revolver and Sgt. Pepper) and popularising the Indian sitar in pop music ("Norwegian Wood"); Harrison further embraced Indian music on songs such as "Love You To", "Within You Without You" and "The Inner Light". Abbey Road (1969) featured prominent use of the Moog synthesiser and the Leslie speaker, along with a medley of song fragments edited together to form a single piece.

Along with their main catalogue, over 100 previously unreleased songs have been released on numerous live albums, compilations, and deluxe editions. These include demos, outtakes, songs the group only recorded live and not in the studio and, for The Beatles Anthology in the 1990s, two reunion songs: "Free as a Bird" and "Real Love". A final reunion song, "Now and Then", was released in 2023. The Beatles remain one of the most acclaimed and influential artists in popular music history. Their songs have been covered thousands of times by a wide range of artists and continue to be celebrated around the world.

== Main songs ==
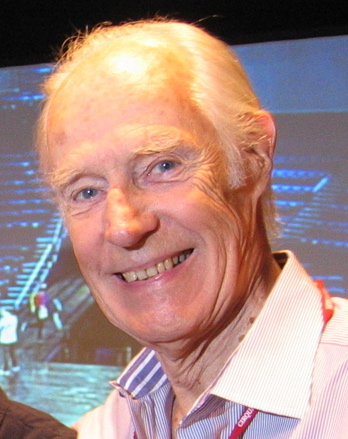
George Martin (pictured in 2006) was the Beatles' primary producer, producing nearly all of their recordings. He is sometimes referred to as the "Fifth Beatle".

Between 1963 and 1966, the Beatles' songs were released on different albums in the United Kingdom and the United States. In the UK, 30 songs were released as non-album singles, while appearing on numerous albums in the US. Since the remastering of the band's catalogue on CDs in the 1980s, the Beatles have a primary "core catalogue" of 14 albums:

- Please Please Me (1963)
- With the Beatles (1963)
- A Hard Day's Night (1964)
- Beatles for Sale (1964)
- Help! (1965)
- Rubber Soul (1965)
- Revolver (1966)
- Sgt. Pepper's Lonely Hearts Club Band (1967)
- Magical Mystery Tour (US LP, 1967) (Note: Magical Mystery Tour was released as a double extended play in the UK, featuring only the songs from the film, and a standard LP in the US, featuring the films tracks and the group's five other 1967 singles. Eventually (in November 1976), the US version was released in the UK. When remastering the Beatles' music on CD in the 1980s, EMI adopted the US LP version rather than the UK EP.)
- The Beatles ("The White Album", 1968)
- Yellow Submarine (1969)
- Abbey Road (1969)
- Let It Be (1970)
- Past Masters (compilation album, 1988) (Note: Past Masters collected 25 of the Beatles' 30 non-album singles, along with the 1964 EP Long Tall Sally and other rarities that were commercially available in the 1960s.)

Key
†	Indicates song not written by the members of the Beatles
#	Indicates song originally released as a non-album single in the UK

Name of song, core catalogue release, songwriter, lead vocalist and year of original release
Song	Core catalogue release(s)	Songwriter(s)	Lead vocal(s) (Note: Lead vocal credits per Castleman and Podrazik's 1976 book All Together Now.)	Year	Ref(s)
"Across the Universe" (Note: "Across the Universe" originally appeared on the charity album No One's Gonna Change Our World in 1969; this version appears on Past Masters (1988). A different mix, with orchestral and choral overdubs by Phil Spector, appears on Let It Be (1970).)	Let It Be; Past Masters	Lennon–McCartney	Lennon	1969	
"Act Naturally"	Help!	Johnny Russell; Voni Morrison †	Starr	1965	
"All I've Got to Do"	With the Beatles	Lennon–McCartney	Lennon	1963	
"All My Loving"	With the Beatles	Lennon–McCartney	McCartney	1963	
"All Together Now"	Yellow Submarine	Lennon–McCartney	McCartney (with Lennon)	1969	
"All You Need Is Love" (Note: Also included on Yellow Submarine (1969).) #	Magical Mystery Tour (A-side of "Baby, You're a Rich Man")	Lennon–McCartney	Lennon	1967	
"And I Love Her"	A Hard Day's Night	Lennon–McCartney	McCartney	1964	
"And Your Bird Can Sing"	Revolver	Lennon–McCartney	Lennon	1966	
"Anna (Go to Him)"	Please Please Me	Arthur Alexander †	Lennon	1963	
"Another Girl"	Help!	Lennon–McCartney	McCartney	1965	
"Any Time at All"	A Hard Day's Night	Lennon–McCartney	Lennon	1964	
"Ask Me Why"	Please Please Me	Lennon–McCartney	Lennon	1963	
"Baby It's You"	Please Please Me	Burt Bacharach; Mack David; Luther Dixon †	Lennon	1963	
"Baby, You're a Rich Man" #	Magical Mystery Tour (B-side of "All You Need Is Love")	Lennon–McCartney	Lennon	1967	
"Baby's in Black"	Beatles for Sale	Lennon–McCartney	Lennon; McCartney	1964	
"Back in the U.S.S.R."	The Beatles ("White Album")	Lennon–McCartney	McCartney	1968	
"Bad Boy"	Past Masters	Larry Williams †	Lennon	1965	
"The Ballad of John and Yoko" #	Past Masters (A-side of "Old Brown Shoe")	Lennon–McCartney	Lennon	1969	
"Because"	Abbey Road	Lennon–McCartney	Lennon (with McCartney and Harrison)	1969	
"Being for the Benefit of Mr. Kite!"	Sgt. Pepper's Lonely Hearts Club Band	Lennon–McCartney	Lennon	1967	
"Birthday"	The Beatles ("White Album")	Lennon–McCartney	McCartney and Lennon	1968	
"Blackbird"	The Beatles ("White Album")	Lennon–McCartney	McCartney	1968	
"Blue Jay Way"	Magical Mystery Tour	Harrison	Harrison	1967	
"Boys"	Please Please Me	Luther Dixon; Wes Farrell †	Starr	1963	
"Can't Buy Me Love"	A Hard Day's Night	Lennon–McCartney	McCartney	1964	
"Carry That Weight"	Abbey Road	Lennon–McCartney	McCartney (with Lennon, Harrison, and Starr)	1969	
"Chains"	Please Please Me	Gerry Goffin; Carole King †	Harrison	1963	
"Come Together"	Abbey Road	Lennon–McCartney	Lennon	1969	
"The Continuing Story of Bungalow Bill"	The Beatles ("White Album")	Lennon–McCartney	Lennon (with Yoko Ono)	1968	
"Cry Baby Cry"	The Beatles ("White Album")	Lennon–McCartney	Lennon; McCartney (Note: "Can You Take Me Back?" section only)	1968	
"A Day in the Life"	Sgt. Pepper's Lonely Hearts Club Band	Lennon–McCartney	Lennon (with McCartney)	1967	
"Day Tripper" #	Past Masters (Double A-side with "We Can Work It Out")	Lennon–McCartney	Lennon; McCartney	1965	
"Dear Prudence"	The Beatles ("White Album")	Lennon–McCartney	Lennon	1968	
"Devil in Her Heart"	With the Beatles	Richard Drapkin †	Harrison	1963	
"Dig a Pony"	Let It Be	Lennon–McCartney	Lennon	1970	
"Dig It"	Let It Be	Lennon; McCartney; Harrison; Starkey	Lennon	1970	
"Dizzy Miss Lizzy"	Help!	Larry Williams †	Lennon	1965	
"Do You Want to Know a Secret"	Please Please Me	Lennon–McCartney	Harrison	1963	
"Doctor Robert"	Revolver	Lennon–McCartney	Lennon	1966	
"Don't Bother Me"	With the Beatles	Harrison	Harrison	1963	
"Don't Let Me Down" (Note: Originally released in 1969 as a single (with "Get Back") and credited to "the Beatles with Billy Preston".) #	Past Masters (B-side of "Get Back")	Lennon–McCartney	Lennon	1969	
"Don't Pass Me By"	The Beatles ("White Album")	Starkey	Starr	1968	
"Drive My Car"	Rubber Soul	Lennon–McCartney	McCartney and Lennon	1965	
"Eight Days a Week"	Beatles for Sale	Lennon–McCartney	Lennon	1964	
"Eleanor Rigby"	Revolver	Lennon–McCartney	McCartney	1966	
"The End"	Abbey Road	Lennon–McCartney	McCartney	1969	
"Every Little Thing"	Beatles for Sale	Lennon–McCartney	Lennon; McCartney	1964	
"Everybody's Got Something to Hide Except Me and My Monkey"	The Beatles ("White Album")	Lennon–McCartney	Lennon	1968	
"Everybody's Trying to Be My Baby"	Beatles for Sale	Carl Perkins †	Harrison	1964	
"Fixing a Hole"	Sgt. Pepper's Lonely Hearts Club Band	Lennon–McCartney	McCartney	1967	
"Flying"	Magical Mystery Tour	Lennon; McCartney; Harrison; Starkey	Instrumental	1967	
"The Fool on the Hill"	Magical Mystery Tour	Lennon–McCartney	McCartney	1967	
"For No One"	Revolver	Lennon–McCartney	McCartney	1966	
"For You Blue"	Let It Be	Harrison	Harrison	1970	
"From Me to You" #	Past Masters (A-side of "Thank You Girl")	Lennon–McCartney	Lennon and McCartney	1963	
"Get Back" (Note: Originally released in 1969 as a single (with "Don't Let Me Down") and credited to "the Beatles with Billy Preston". This version appears on Past Masters (1988). A different mix produced by Phil Spector was subsequently released a year later on Let It Be (1970).) #	Let It Be; Past Masters (A-side of "Don't Let Me Down")	Lennon–McCartney	McCartney	1969	
"Getting Better"	Sgt. Pepper's Lonely Hearts Club Band	Lennon–McCartney	McCartney	1967	
"Girl"	Rubber Soul	Lennon–McCartney	Lennon	1965	
"Glass Onion"	The Beatles ("White Album")	Lennon–McCartney	Lennon	1968	
"Golden Slumbers"	Abbey Road	Lennon–McCartney	McCartney	1969	
"Good Day Sunshine"	Revolver	Lennon–McCartney	McCartney	1966	
"Good Morning Good Morning"	Sgt. Pepper's Lonely Hearts Club Band	Lennon–McCartney	Lennon	1967	
"Good Night"	The Beatles ("White Album")	Lennon–McCartney	Starr	1968	
"Got to Get You into My Life"	Revolver	Lennon–McCartney	McCartney	1966	
"Happiness Is a Warm Gun"	The Beatles ("White Album")	Lennon–McCartney	Lennon	1968	
"A Hard Day's Night"	A Hard Day's Night	Lennon–McCartney	Lennon (with McCartney)	1964	
"Hello, Goodbye" #	Magical Mystery Tour	Lennon–McCartney	McCartney	1967	
"Help!"	Help! (A-side of "I'm Down")	Lennon–McCartney	Lennon	1965	
"Helter Skelter"	The Beatles ("White Album")	Lennon–McCartney	McCartney	1968	
"Her Majesty"	Abbey Road	Lennon–McCartney	McCartney	1969	
"Here Comes the Sun"	Abbey Road	Harrison	Harrison	1969	
"Here, There and Everywhere"	Revolver	Lennon–McCartney	McCartney	1966	
"Hey Bulldog"	Yellow Submarine	Lennon–McCartney	Lennon	1969	
"Hey Jude" #	Past Masters (A-side of "Revolution")	Lennon–McCartney	McCartney	1968	
"Hold Me Tight"	With the Beatles	Lennon–McCartney	McCartney	1963	
"Honey Don't"	Beatles for Sale	Carl Perkins †	Starr	1964	
"Honey Pie"	The Beatles ("White Album")	Lennon–McCartney	McCartney	1968	
"I Am the Walrus"	Magical Mystery Tour	Lennon–McCartney	Lennon	1967	
"I Call Your Name" (Note: Originally recorded by Billy J. Kramer with the Dakotas and released as a single (with "Bad to Me") in 1963.)	Past Masters (Long Tall Sally EP)	Lennon–McCartney	Lennon	1964	
"I Don't Want to Spoil the Party"	Beatles for Sale	Lennon–McCartney	Lennon (with McCartney)	1964	
"I Feel Fine" #	Past Masters (A-side of "She's a Woman")	Lennon–McCartney	Lennon	1964	
"I Me Mine"	Let It Be	Harrison	Harrison	1970	
"I Need You"	Help!	Harrison	Harrison	1965	
"I Saw Her Standing There"	Please Please Me	Lennon–McCartney	McCartney	1963	
"I Should Have Known Better"	A Hard Day's Night	Lennon–McCartney	Lennon	1964	
"I Wanna Be Your Man" (Note: First recorded and released by the Rolling Stones, the Beatles' own version appeared on With the Beatles shortly after.)	With the Beatles	Lennon–McCartney	Starr	1963	
"I Want to Hold Your Hand" #	Past Masters (A-side of "This Boy")	Lennon–McCartney	Lennon and McCartney	1963	
"I Want to Tell You"	Revolver	Harrison	Harrison	1966	
"I Want You (She's So Heavy)"	Abbey Road	Lennon–McCartney	Lennon	1969	
"I Will"	The Beatles ("White Album")	Lennon–McCartney	McCartney	1968	
"If I Fell"	A Hard Day's Night	Lennon–McCartney	Lennon (with McCartney)	1964	
"If I Needed Someone"	Rubber Soul	Harrison	Harrison	1965	
"I'll Be Back"	A Hard Day's Night	Lennon–McCartney	Lennon and McCartney	1964	
"I'll Cry Instead"	A Hard Day's Night	Lennon–McCartney	Lennon	1964	
"I'll Follow the Sun"	Beatles for Sale	Lennon–McCartney	McCartney	1964	
"I'll Get You" #	Past Masters (B-side of "She Loves You")	Lennon–McCartney	Lennon and McCartney	1963	
"I'm a Loser"	Beatles for Sale	Lennon–McCartney	Lennon	1964	
"I'm Down" #	Past Masters (B-side of "Help!")	Lennon–McCartney	McCartney	1965	
"I'm Happy Just to Dance with You"	A Hard Day's Night	Lennon–McCartney	Harrison	1964	
"I'm Looking Through You"	Rubber Soul	Lennon–McCartney	McCartney	1965	
"I'm Only Sleeping"	Revolver	Lennon–McCartney	Lennon	1966	
"I'm So Tired"	The Beatles ("White Album")	Lennon–McCartney	Lennon	1968	
"I've Got a Feeling"	Let It Be	Lennon–McCartney	McCartney and Lennon	1970	
"I've Just Seen a Face"	Help!	Lennon–McCartney	McCartney	1965	
"In My Life"	Rubber Soul	Lennon–McCartney	Lennon	1965	
"The Inner Light" #	Past Masters (B-side of "Lady Madonna")	Harrison	Harrison	1968	
"It Won't Be Long"	With the Beatles	Lennon–McCartney	Lennon	1963	
"It's All Too Much"	Yellow Submarine	Harrison	Harrison	1969	
"It's Only Love"	Help!	Lennon–McCartney	Lennon	1965	
"Julia"	The Beatles ("White Album")	Lennon–McCartney	Lennon	1968	
"Kansas City/Hey-Hey-Hey-Hey!"	Beatles for Sale	Jerry Leiber; Mike Stoller / Richard Penniman †	McCartney	1964	
"Komm, gib mir deine Hand" # (German version of "I Want to Hold Your Hand")	Past Masters	Lennon; McCartney; Jean Nicolas; Heinz Hellmer	Lennon; McCartney	1964	
"Lady Madonna" #	Past Masters (A-side of "The Inner Light")	Lennon–McCartney	McCartney	1968	
"Let It Be" (Note: The single version of "Let It Be", produced by George Martin, was released in March 1970, and appears on Past Masters (1988). The album version, produced by Phil Spector, features an additional guitar solo and minor differences in the orchestral sections, appears on Let It Be (1970).)	Let It Be; Past Masters (A-side of "You Know My Name (Look Up the Number)")	Lennon–McCartney	McCartney	1970	
"Little Child"	With the Beatles	Lennon–McCartney	Lennon and McCartney	1963	
"The Long and Winding Road"	Let It Be	Lennon–McCartney	McCartney	1970	
"Long Tall Sally"	Past Masters (Long Tall Sally EP)	Robert Blackwell; Enotris Johnson; Richard Penniman †	McCartney	1964	
"Long, Long, Long"	The Beatles ("White Album")	Harrison	Harrison	1968	
"Love Me Do" (Note: Three different versions of "Love Me Do" exist. The first version, recorded on 6 June 1962 with Pete Best on drums, appears on Anthology 1 (1995). The second version, recorded on 4 September 1962 with Ringo Starr on drums, was released as a UK single in 1962 and appears on Past Masters (1988). The third version, recorded on 11 September 1962 with session drummer Andy White on drums and Starr on tambourine, was released as a US single in 1962 and appears on Please Please Me (1963).)	Please Please Me; Past Masters	Lennon–McCartney	McCartney and Lennon	1962	
"Love You To"	Revolver	Harrison	Harrison	1966	
"Lovely Rita"	Sgt. Pepper's Lonely Hearts Club Band	Lennon–McCartney	McCartney	1967	
"Lucy in the Sky with Diamonds"	Sgt. Pepper's Lonely Hearts Club Band	Lennon–McCartney	Lennon	1967	
"Maggie Mae"	Let It Be	Traditional, arr. Lennon; McCartney; Harrison; Starkey †	Lennon and McCartney	1970	
"Magical Mystery Tour"	Magical Mystery Tour	Lennon–McCartney	McCartney and Lennon	1967	
"Martha My Dear"	The Beatles ("White Album")	Lennon–McCartney	McCartney	1968	
"Matchbox"	Past Masters (Long Tall Sally EP)	Carl Perkins †	Starr	1964	
"Maxwell's Silver Hammer"	Abbey Road	Lennon–McCartney	McCartney	1969	
"Mean Mr. Mustard"	Abbey Road	Lennon–McCartney	Lennon	1969	
"Michelle"	Rubber Soul	Lennon–McCartney	McCartney	1965	
"Misery"	Please Please Me	Lennon–McCartney	Lennon and McCartney	1963	
"Money (That's What I Want)"	With the Beatles	Berry Gordy; Janie Bradford †	Lennon	1963	
"Mother Nature's Son"	The Beatles ("White Album")	Lennon–McCartney	McCartney	1968	
"Mr. Moonlight"	Beatles for Sale	Roy Lee Johnson †	Lennon	1964	
"The Night Before"	Help!	Lennon–McCartney	McCartney	1965	
"No Reply"	Beatles for Sale	Lennon–McCartney	Lennon	1964	
"Norwegian Wood (This Bird Has Flown)"	Rubber Soul	Lennon–McCartney	Lennon	1965	
"Not a Second Time"	With the Beatles	Lennon–McCartney	Lennon	1963	
"Nowhere Man"	Rubber Soul	Lennon–McCartney	Lennon	1965	
"Ob-La-Di, Ob-La-Da"	The Beatles ("White Album")	Lennon–McCartney	McCartney	1968	
"Octopus's Garden"	Abbey Road	Starkey	Starr	1969	
"Oh! Darling"	Abbey Road	Lennon–McCartney	McCartney	1969	
"Old Brown Shoe" #	Past Masters (B-side of "The Ballad of John and Yoko")	Harrison	Harrison	1969	
"One After 909"	Let It Be	Lennon–McCartney	Lennon and McCartney	1970	
"Only a Northern Song"	Yellow Submarine	Harrison	Harrison	1969	
"Paperback Writer" #	Past Masters	Lennon–McCartney	McCartney	1966	
"Penny Lane" #	Magical Mystery Tour (Double A-side with "Strawberry Fields Forever")	Lennon–McCartney	McCartney	1967	
"Piggies"	The Beatles ("White Album")	Harrison	Harrison	1968	
"Please Mr. Postman"	With the Beatles	Georgia Dobbins; William Garrett; Brian Holland; Robert Bateman; Freddie Gorman †	Lennon	1963	
"Please Please Me"	Please Please Me	Lennon–McCartney	Lennon and McCartney	1963	
"Polythene Pam"	Abbey Road	Lennon–McCartney	Lennon	1969	
"P.S. I Love You"	Please Please Me	Lennon–McCartney	McCartney	1962	
"Rain" #	Past Masters (B-side of "Paperback Writer")	Lennon–McCartney	Lennon	1966	
"Revolution" (Note: The single version of "Revolution" has a hard rock style that is in a higher key and faster tempo than "Revolution 1".) #	Past Masters (B-side of "Hey Jude")	Lennon–McCartney	Lennon	1968	
"Revolution 1" (Note: "Revolution 1" has a more blues-influenced style and relaxed tempo than "Revolution". It also contains "shoo-bee-do-wop" backing vocals that are reminiscent of doo-wop music.)	The Beatles ("White Album")	Lennon–McCartney	Lennon	1968	
"Revolution 9" (Note: "Revolution 9" is an avant-garde sound collage that evolved from take 20 of "Revolution 1". It features numerous sound effects, tape loops and overdubs that were recorded and compiled over several sessions almost exclusively by Lennon and Yoko Ono, although Harrison provided assistance for spoken overdubs.)	The Beatles ("White Album")	Lennon–McCartney	Sound Collage	1968	
"Rock and Roll Music"	Beatles for Sale	Chuck Berry †	Lennon	1964	
"Rocky Raccoon"	The Beatles ("White Album")	Lennon–McCartney	McCartney	1968	
"Roll Over Beethoven"	With the Beatles	Chuck Berry †	Harrison	1963	
"Run for Your Life"	Rubber Soul	Lennon–McCartney	Lennon	1965	
"Savoy Truffle"	The Beatles ("White Album")	Harrison	Harrison	1968	
"Sexy Sadie"	The Beatles ("White Album")	Lennon–McCartney	Lennon	1968	
"Sgt. Pepper's Lonely Hearts Club Band"	Sgt. Pepper's Lonely Hearts Club Band	Lennon–McCartney	McCartney	1967	
"Sgt. Pepper's Lonely Hearts Club Band (Reprise)"	Sgt. Pepper's Lonely Hearts Club Band	Lennon–McCartney	McCartney; Lennon; Harrison	1967	
"She Came In Through the Bathroom Window"	Abbey Road	Lennon–McCartney	McCartney	1969	
"She Loves You" #	Past Masters	Lennon–McCartney	Lennon; McCartney	1963	
"She Said She Said"	Revolver	Lennon–McCartney	Lennon	1966	
"She's a Woman" #	Past Masters (B-side of "I Feel Fine")	Lennon–McCartney	McCartney	1964	
"She's Leaving Home"	Sgt. Pepper's Lonely Hearts Club Band	Lennon–McCartney	McCartney (with Lennon)	1967	
"Sie liebt dich" # (German version of "She Loves You")	Past Masters (B-side of "Komm, gib mir deine Hand")	Lennon; McCartney; Jean Nicolas; Lee Montogue	Lennon; McCartney	1964	
"Slow Down"	Past Masters (Long Tall Sally EP)	Larry Williams †	Lennon	1964	
"Something"	Abbey Road	Harrison	Harrison	1969	
"Strawberry Fields Forever" #	Magical Mystery Tour (Double A-side with "Penny Lane")	Lennon–McCartney	Lennon	1967	
"Sun King"	Abbey Road	Lennon–McCartney	Lennon (with McCartney and Harrison)	1969	
"A Taste of Honey"	Please Please Me	Bobby Scott; Ric Marlow †	McCartney	1963	
"Taxman"	Revolver	Harrison	Harrison	1966	
"Tell Me What You See"	Help!	Lennon–McCartney	McCartney (with Lennon)	1965	
"Tell Me Why"	A Hard Day's Night	Lennon–McCartney	Lennon	1964	
"Thank You Girl" #	Past Masters (B-side of "From Me to You")	Lennon–McCartney	Lennon and McCartney	1963	
"There's a Place"	Please Please Me	Lennon–McCartney	Lennon and McCartney	1963	
"Things We Said Today"	A Hard Day's Night	Lennon–McCartney	McCartney	1964	
"Think for Yourself"	Rubber Soul	Harrison	Harrison	1965	
"This Boy" #	Past Masters (B-side of "I Want to Hold Your Hand" (UK))	Lennon–McCartney	Lennon (with McCartney and Harrison)	1963	
"Ticket to Ride"	Help! (A-side of "Yes It Is")	Lennon–McCartney	Lennon	1965	
"Till There Was You"	With the Beatles	Meredith Willson †	McCartney	1963	
"Tomorrow Never Knows"	Revolver	Lennon–McCartney	Lennon	1966	
"Twist and Shout"	Please Please Me	Phil Medley; Bert Berns †	Lennon	1963	
"Two of Us"	Let It Be	Lennon–McCartney	McCartney and Lennon	1970	
"Wait"	Rubber Soul	Lennon–McCartney	McCartney and Lennon	1965	
"We Can Work It Out" #	Past Masters (Double A-side with "Day Tripper")	Lennon–McCartney	McCartney	1965	
"What Goes On"	Rubber Soul	Lennon; McCartney; Starkey	Starr	1965	
"What You're Doing"	Beatles for Sale	Lennon–McCartney	McCartney	1964	
"When I Get Home"	A Hard Day's Night	Lennon–McCartney	Lennon	1964	
"When I'm Sixty-Four"	Sgt. Pepper's Lonely Hearts Club Band	Lennon–McCartney	McCartney	1967	
"While My Guitar Gently Weeps"	The Beatles ("White Album")	Harrison	Harrison	1968	
"Why Don't We Do It in the Road?"	The Beatles ("White Album")	Lennon–McCartney	McCartney	1968	
"Wild Honey Pie"	The Beatles ("White Album")	Lennon–McCartney	McCartney	1968	
"With a Little Help from My Friends"	Sgt. Pepper's Lonely Hearts Club Band	Lennon–McCartney	Starr	1967	
"Within You Without You"	Sgt. Pepper's Lonely Hearts Club Band	Harrison	Harrison	1967	
"The Word"	Rubber Soul	Lennon–McCartney	Lennon	1965	
"Words of Love"	Beatles for Sale	Buddy Holly †	Lennon; McCartney	1964	
"Yellow Submarine"	Revolver	Lennon–McCartney	Starr	1966	
"Yer Blues"	The Beatles ("White Album")	Lennon–McCartney	Lennon	1968	
"Yes It Is" #	Past Masters (B-side of "Ticket to Ride")	Lennon–McCartney	Lennon (with McCartney and Harrison)	1965	
"Yesterday"	Help!	Lennon–McCartney	McCartney	1965	
"You Can't Do That"	A Hard Day's Night	Lennon–McCartney	Lennon	1964	
"You Know My Name (Look Up the Number)" #	Past Masters (B-side of "Let It Be")	Lennon–McCartney	Lennon; McCartney	1970	
"You Like Me Too Much"	Help!	Harrison	Harrison	1965	
"You Never Give Me Your Money"	Abbey Road	Lennon–McCartney	McCartney	1969	
"You Really Got a Hold on Me"	With the Beatles	Smokey Robinson †	Lennon (with Harrison)	1963	
"You Won't See Me"	Rubber Soul	Lennon–McCartney	McCartney	1965	
"Your Mother Should Know"	Magical Mystery Tour	Lennon–McCartney	McCartney	1967	
"You're Going to Lose That Girl"	Help!	Lennon–McCartney	Lennon	1965	
"You've Got to Hide Your Love Away"	Help!	Lennon–McCartney	Lennon	1965	

== Other released songs ==
In addition to their main catalogue, over 100 songs that were recorded by the group have been released. The first official release of new recordings after the band split up was Live at the BBC in 1994, which features live performances of mostly cover songs that were recorded on various BBC Light Programme radio shows between 1963 and 1965. Further recordings from these shows were released on On Air – Live at the BBC Volume 2 in 2013. The Beatles Anthology project in the 1990s featured rarities, outtakes and live performances across their entire career, along with the reunion songs "Free as a Bird" and "Real Love", which were recorded as demos by Lennon before his death in 1980 and completed by the surviving Beatles. Another demo, "Now and Then", was attempted during the Anthology project before being completed in 2023 using AI technology developed by Peter Jackson for The Beatles: Get Back. Further recordings have been released on various compilation albums and deluxe editions.

Key
†	Indicates song not written by the members of the Beatles
‡	Indicates live recording

Name of song, release(s), songwriter(s), lead vocalist, year recorded and year released
Song	Release(s)	Songwriter(s)	Lead vocal(s)	Year recorded	Year released	Ref(s)
"12-Bar Original"	Anthology 2	Lennon; McCartney; Harrison; Starkey	Instrumental	1965	1996	
"Ain't She Sweet"	The Beatles' First	Jack Yellen; Milton Ager †	Lennon	1961	1964	
"Ain't She Sweet"	Anthology 3	Jack Yellen; Milton Ager †	Lennon	1969	1996	
"All Things Must Pass"	Anthology 3	Harrison	Harrison	1969	1996	
"Bad to Me"	The Beatles Bootleg Recordings 1963	Lennon; McCartney	Lennon	1963	2013	
"Beautiful Dreamer" ‡	On Air – Live at the BBC Volume 2	Stephen Foster; Gerry Goffin; Jack Keller †	McCartney	1963	2013	
"Bésame Mucho"	Anthology 1	Consuelo Velázquez; Sunny Skylar †	McCartney	1962	1995	
"Blue Moon"	The Beatles ("White Album") (2018 Deluxe Edition)	Richard Rodgers; Lorenz Hart †	McCartney	1968	2018	
"Can You Dig It?"	Let It Be: Special Edition	Lennon; McCartney; Harrison; Starr	–	1969	2021	
"Can You Take Me Back?"	The Beatles ("White Album") (2018 Deluxe Edition)	Lennon; McCartney	McCartney	1968	2018	
"Carol" ‡	Live at the BBC	Chuck Berry †	Lennon	1963	1994	
"Cayenne"	Anthology 1	McCartney	Instrumental	1960	1995	
"Child of Nature"	The Beatles ("White Album") (2018 Deluxe Edition)	Lennon	Lennon	1968	2018	
"Christmas Time (Is Here Again)"	Non-album single (B-side of "Free as a Bird")	Lennon; McCartney; Harrison; Starkey	Lennon; McCartney; Harrison; Starr	1967	1995	
"Circles"	The Beatles ("White Album") (2018 Deluxe Edition)	Harrison	Harrison	1968	2018	
"Clarabella" ‡	Live at the BBC	Frank Pingatore †	McCartney	1963	1994	
"Come and Get It"	Anthology 3	McCartney	McCartney	1969	1996	
"Cry for a Shadow"	The Beatles' First	Lennon; Harrison	Instrumental	1961	1964	
"Crying, Waiting, Hoping" ‡	Live at the BBC	Buddy Holly †	Harrison	1963	1994	
"Don't Ever Change" ‡	Live at the BBC	Gerry Goffin; Carole King †	Harrison; McCartney	1963	1994	
"Free as a Bird"	Anthology 1	Lennon; McCartney; Harrison; Starkey	Lennon; McCartney; Harrison	1977	1995	
"Gimme Some Truth" (Rehearsals)	Let It Be: Special Edition	Lennon	Lennon	1969	2021	
"Glad All Over" ‡	Live at the BBC	Roy C. Bennett; Sid Tepper; Aaron Schroeder †	Harrison	1963	1994	
"God Save the Queen" (Jam) ‡	The Beatles: Get Back – The Rooftop Performance	Traditional †	Instrumental	1969	2022	
"Goodbye"	Abbey Road (2019 Super Deluxe edition)	Lennon; McCartney	McCartney	1969	2019	
"Hallelujah, I Love Her So"	Anthology 1	Ray Charles †	McCartney	1960	1995	
"Happy Birthday Dear Saturday Club" ‡	On Air – Live at the BBC Volume 2	Disputed †		1963	2013	
"Hello Little Girl"	Anthology 1	Lennon; McCartney	Lennon	1962	1995	
"The Hippy Hippy Shake" ‡	Live at the BBC	Chan Romero †	McCartney	1963	1994	
"The Honeymoon Song" ‡	Live at the BBC	Mikis Theodorakis; William Sansom †	McCartney	1963	1994	
"How Do You Do It?"	Anthology 1	Mitch Murray †	Lennon and McCartney	1962	1995	
"I Forgot to Remember to Forget" ‡	Live at the BBC	Stan Kesler; Charlie Feathers †	Harrison	1964	1994	
"I Got a Woman" ‡	Live at the BBC	Ray Charles †	Lennon	1963	1994	
"I Got to Find My Baby" ‡	Live at the BBC	Chuck Berry †	Lennon	1963	1994	
"I Just Don't Understand" ‡	Live at the BBC	Marijohn Wilkin; Kent Westberry †	Lennon	1963	1994	
"I'll Be on My Way" ‡	Live at the BBC	Lennon; McCartney	Lennon and McCartney	1963	1994	
"I'm in Love"	The Beatles Bootleg Recordings 1963	Lennon; McCartney	Lennon	1963	2013	
"I'm Gonna Sit Right Down and Cry (Over You)" ‡	Live at the BBC	Joe Thomas; Howard Biggs †	Lennon	1963	1994	
"I'm Ready (Rocker)" / "Save the Last Dance for Me" / "Don't Let Me Down" (Medley)	Let It Be: Special Edition	Fats Domino; Al Lewis; Sylvester Bradford † / Doc Pomus; Mort Shuman † / Lennon; McCartney	–	1969	2021	
"I'm Talking About You" ‡	On Air – Live at the BBC Volume 2	Chuck Berry †	Lennon	1963	2013	
"If You've Got Trouble"	Anthology 2	Lennon; McCartney	Starr	1965	1996	
"In Spite of All the Danger"	Anthology 1	McCartney; Harrison	Lennon (with McCartney)	1958	1995	
"Johnny B. Goode" ‡	Live at the BBC	Chuck Berry †	Lennon	1964	1994	
"Junk"	Anthology 3	McCartney	McCartney	1968	1996	
"Keep Your Hands off My Baby" ‡	Live at the BBC	Gerry Goffin; Carole King †	Lennon	1963	1994	
"Leave My Kitten Alone"	Anthology 1	Little Willie John; Titus Turner; James McDougall †	Lennon	1964	1995	
"Lend Me Your Comb" ‡	Anthology 1	Kay Twomey; Fred Wise; Ben Weisman †	McCartney (with Lennon and Harrison)	1963	1995	
"Like Dreamers Do"	Anthology 1	Lennon; McCartney	McCartney	1962	1995	
"Lonesome Tears in My Eyes" ‡	Live at the BBC	Johnny Burnette; Dorsey Burnette; Paul Burlison; Al Mortimer †	Lennon	1963	1994	
"Little Girl"	Rubber Soul: Super Deluxe Edition	Lennon	Lennon	1965	2026	
"Lucille" ‡	Live at the BBC	Little Richard; Albert Collins †	McCartney	1963	1994	
"Maggie Mae / Fancy My Chances with You"	Let It Be: Special Edition	Traditional † / Lennon; McCartney	Lennon; McCartney	1969	2021	
"Mailman, Bring Me No More Blues" ‡	Anthology 3	Ruth Roberts; Bill Katz; Stanley Clayton †	Lennon	1969	1996	
"Memphis, Tennessee" ‡	Live at the BBC	Chuck Berry †	Lennon	1963	1994	
"Moonlight Bay" ‡	Anthology 1	Percy Wenrich; Edward Madden †	Lennon; McCartney; Harrison; Eric Morecambe; Ernie Wise	1963	1995	
"My Bonnie"	My Bonnie	Trad. arr. Tony Sheridan †	Tony Sheridan	1961	1961	
"Nobody's Child"	The Beatles' First	Cy Coben, Mel Foree †	Tony Sheridan	1961	1964	
"Not Guilty"	Anthology 3	Harrison	Harrison	1968	1996	
"Nothin' Shakin'" ‡	Live at the BBC	Eddie Fontaine; Cirino Colacrai; Diane Lampert; John Gluck Jr. †	Harrison	1963	1994	
"Now and Then" (Note: Also appears on Anthology 4)	1967–1970 (2023 expanded edition)	Lennon; McCartney; Harrison; Starkey	Lennon; McCartney	1977; 1995; 2023	2023	
"Ooh! My Soul" ‡	Live at the BBC	Little Richard †	McCartney	1963	1994	
"Real Love"	Anthology 2	Lennon	Lennon	1979	1996	
"Rip It Up"/"Shake, Rattle and Roll"/"Blue Suede Shoes"	Anthology 3	Robert Blackwell; John Marascalco / Charles Calhoun / Carl Perkins †	Lennon; McCartney	1969	1996	
"Searchin'"	Anthology 1	Jerry Leiber; Mike Stoller †	McCartney	1962	1995	
"The Sheik of Araby"	Anthology 1	Harry B. Smith; Francis Wheeler; Ted Snyder †	Harrison	1962	1995	
"A Shot of Rhythm and Blues" ‡	Live at the BBC	Terry Thompson †	Lennon	1963	1994	
"Shout" ‡	Anthology 1	Rudolph Isley; Ronald Isley; O'Kelly Isley Jr. †	Lennon; McCartney; Harrison; Starr	1964	1995	
"So How Come (No One Loves Me)" ‡	Live at the BBC	Felice Bryant; Boudleaux Bryant †	Harrison	1963	1994	
"Soldier of Love" ‡	Live at the BBC	Buzz Cason; Tony Moon †	Lennon	1963	1994	
"Some Other Guy" ‡	Live at the BBC	Jerry Leiber; Mike Stoller; Richie Barrett †	Lennon and McCartney	1963	1994	
"Sour Milk Sea"	The Beatles ("White Album") (2018 Deluxe Edition)	Harrison	Harrison	1968	2018	
"Step Inside Love/Los Paranoias"	Anthology 3	Lennon; McCartney / Lennon; McCartney; Harrison; Starkey	McCartney	1968	1996	
"St. Louis Blues"	The Beatles ("White Album") (2018 Deluxe Edition)	W. C. Handy †	McCartney	1968	2018	
"Sure to Fall (in Love with You)" ‡	Live at the BBC	Carl Perkins; Quinton Claunch; Bill Cantrell †	McCartney	1963	1994	
"Sweet Georgia Brown"	Ya Ya	Lee Dorsey; Clarence Lewis; Morgan Robinson; Morris Levy †	Tony Sheridan	1961	1962	
"Sweet Little Sixteen" ‡	Live at the BBC	Chuck Berry †	Lennon	1963	1994	
"Take Out Some Insurance on Me, Baby"	The Beatles' First	Charles Singleton, Waldenese Hall †	Tony Sheridan	1961	1964	
"Teddy Boy" (Note: Also appears on Let It Be: Special Edition (2021))	Anthology 3	McCartney	McCartney	1969	1996	
"That Means a Lot"	Anthology 2	Lennon; McCartney	McCartney	1965	1996	
"That'll Be the Day"	Anthology 1	Jerry Allison; Buddy Holly; Norman Petty †	Lennon	1958	1995	
"That's All Right (Mama)" ‡	Live at the BBC	Arthur Crudup †	McCartney	1963	1994	
"Three Cool Cats"	Anthology 1	Jerry Leiber; Mike Stoller †	Harrison	1962	1995	
"To Know Her Is to Love Her" ‡	Live at the BBC	Phil Spector †	Lennon	1963	1994	
"Too Much Monkey Business" ‡	Live at the BBC	Chuck Berry †	Lennon	1963	1994	
"Wake Up Little Susie" ‡ (medley with "I Me Mine" [Take 11])	Let It Be: Special Edition	Felice Bryant; Boudleaux Bryant † / Harrison	–	1969	2021	
"The Walk" (Jam) ‡	Let It Be: Special Edition	Jimmy McCracklin; Bob Garlic †	–	1969	2021	
"What's the New Mary Jane"	Anthology 3	Lennon; McCartney	Lennon	1968	1996	
"When the Saints Go Marching In"	My Bonnie	Trad. arr. Tony Sheridan †	Tony Sheridan	1961	1961	
"Why"	The Beatles' First	Bill Crompton; Tony Sheridan †	Tony Sheridan	1961	1964	
"Without a Song" (Jam – Billy Preston with John and Ringo) ‡	Let It Be: Special Edition	Vincent Youmans; Billy Rose; Edward Eliscu †	–	1969	2021	
"You Know What to Do"	Anthology 1	Harrison	Harrison	1964	1995	
"Young Blood" ‡	Live at the BBC	Jerry Leiber; Mike Stoller; Doc Pomus †	Harrison	1963	1994	
"You'll Be Mine"	Anthology 1	Lennon; McCartney	McCartney	1960	1995	
"(You're So Square) Baby I Don't Care"	The Beatles ("White Album") (2018 Deluxe Edition)	Jerry Leiber; Mike Stoller †	McCartney	1968	2018	

== Film/documentary songs ==
While the Beatles were active, four songs solely appeared in two of the groups' films: one in Magical Mystery Tour (1967) and three in Let It Be (1970). In The Beatles: Get Back documentary, the band were shown playing over 100 songs that did not appear on an official release.

Key
†	Indicates song not written by the members of the Beatles

Name of song, film/documentary, songwriter(s), lead vocalist, year recorded and year released
Song	Film/documentary	Songwriter(s)	Lead vocal(s)	Year recorded	Year released	Ref(s)
"Another Day"	The Beatles: Get Back	Paul McCartney; Linda McCartney	McCartney	1969	2021	
"Baa, Baa, Black Sheep"	The Beatles: Get Back	Traditional †	Starr	1969	2021	
"The Back Seat of My Car"	The Beatles: Get Back	McCartney	McCartney	1969	2021	
"Because I Know You Love Me So"	The Beatles: Get Back	Lennon; McCartney	Lennon; McCartney	1969	2021	
"Build Me Up Buttercup"	The Beatles: Get Back	Mike d'Abo; Tony Macaulay †	McCartney	1969	2021	
"Bye, Bye Love"	The Beatles: Get Back	Felice Bryant; Boudleaux Bryant †	Lennon	1969	2021	
"Carolina Moon"	The Beatles: Get Back	Joe Burke; Benny Davis †	McCartney	1969	2021	
"The Palace of the King of the Birds"	The Beatles: Get Back	Lennon; McCartney	McCartney	1969	2021	
"Commonwealth"	The Beatles: Get Back	Lennon; McCartney	McCartney	1969	2021	
"Cupcake Baby"	The Beatles: Get Back	Lennon	Lennon	1969	2021	
"Dehra Dun"	The Beatles: Get Back	Harrison	Harrison	1969	2021	
"Enoch Powell"	The Beatles: Get Back	Lennon; McCartney	McCartney	1969	2021	
"Everybody's Got Soul"	The Beatles: Get Back	Lennon; McCartney	–	1969	2021	
"Fancy My Chances with You"	The Beatles: Get Back	Lennon; McCartney	Lennon; McCartney	1969	2021	
"Forty Days"	The Beatles: Get Back	Chuck Berry †	–	1969	2021	
"Freakout Jam"	The Beatles: Get Back	Lennon; McCartney; Ono	Ono	1969	2021	
"Friendship"	The Beatles: Get Back	Cole Porter †	Lennon; McCartney	1969	2021	
"Gilly Gilly Ossenfeffer Katzenellen Bogen by the Sea"	The Beatles: Get Back	Al Hoffman; Dick Manning †	–	1969	2021	
"Going Up the Country"	The Beatles: Get Back	Alan Wilson †	McCartney	1969	2021	
"Good Rocking Tonight"	The Beatles: Get Back	Roy Brown †	Lennon	1969	2021	
"Half a Pound of Greasepaint"	The Beatles: Get Back	Lennon; McCartney	McCartney	1969	2021	
"Hallelujah I Love Her So"	The Beatles: Get Back	Ray Charles †	Lennon	1969	2021	
"The Harry Line Theme from The Third Man"	The Beatles: Get Back	Anton Karas †	Instrumental	1969	2021	
"Hi-Heel Sneakers"	The Beatles: Get Back	Robert Higginbotham †	McCartney	1969	2021	
"Honey Hush"	The Beatles: Get Back	Big Joe Turner †	McCartney	1969	2021	
"The House of the Rising Sun"	The Beatles: Get Back	Traditional †	McCartney	1969	2021	
"I Bought a Piano the Other Day" (AKA "Jazz Piano Song")	Let It Be	Lennon; McCartney; Starkey	McCartney; Starr	1969	1970	
"I Lost My Little Girl"	The Beatles: Get Back	McCartney	Lennon	1969	2021	
"I Shall Be Released"	The Beatles: Get Back	Bob Dylan †	McCartney	1969	2021	
"I Told You Before"	The Beatles: Get Back	Lennon; McCartney; Harrison; Starkey	–	1969	2021	
"It's Only Make Believe"	The Beatles: Get Back	Jack Nance; Conway Twitty †	–	1969	2021	
"Jam"	The Beatles: Get Back	Lennon; McCartney; Starkey; Ono	Ono	1969	2021	
"John"	The Beatles: Get Back	Ono	Ono	1969	2021	
"Jessie's Dream"	Magical Mystery Tour	Lennon; McCartney; Harrison; Starkey	Instrumental	1967	1967	
"Just Fun"	The Beatles: Get Back	Lennon; McCartney	Lennon; McCartney	1969	2021	
"Lawdy Miss Clawdy"	Let It Be	Lloyd Price †	Lennon	1969	1970	
"Madman"	The Beatles: Get Back	Lennon; McCartney	McCartney	1969	2021	
"Mama, You Been on My Mind"	The Beatles: Get Back	Bob Dylan †	Harrison	1969	2021	
"Midnight Special"	The Beatles: Get Back	Traditional †	–	1969	2021	
"Milk Cow Blues"	The Beatles: Get Back	Kokomo Arnold †	Lennon	1969	2021	
"Miss Ann"	The Beatles: Get Back	Richard Penniman; Enotris Johnson †	–	1969	2021	
"My Baby Left Me"	The Beatles: Get Back	Arthur Crudup †	McCartney	1969	2021	
"My Imagination"	The Beatles: Get Back	Lennon; McCartney; Harrison; Starkey	Instrumental	1969	2021	
"New Orleans"	The Beatles: Get Back	Frank Guida; Joseph Royster †	–	1969	2021	
"Piano Piece (Bonding)"	The Beatles: Get Back	Lennon; McCartney	McCartney	1969	2021	
"A Pretty Girl Is Like a Melody"	The Beatles: Get Back	Irving Berlin †	Lennon	1969	2021	
"Queen of the Hop"	The Beatles: Get Back	Woody Harris †	McCartney	1969	2021	
"Quinn the Eskimo (Mighty Quinn)"	The Beatles: Get Back	Bob Dylan †	McCartney	1969	2021	
"Reach Out I'll Be There"	The Beatles: Get Back	Holland–Dozier–Holland †	Harrison	1969	2021	
"School Day (Ring Ring Goes the Bell)"	The Beatles: Get Back	Chuck Berry †	–	1969	2021	
"Shakin' in the Sixties"	The Beatles: Get Back	Lennon	Lennon	1969	2021	
"Song of Love"	The Beatles: Get Back	Lennon; McCartney	McCartney	1969	2021	
"Stand by Me"	The Beatles: Get Back	Ben E. King †	McCartney	1969	2021	
"Suzy Parker"	Let It Be	Lennon; McCartney; Harrison; Starkey	Lennon	1969	1970	
"Take These Chains from My Heart"	The Beatles: Get Back	Fred Rose; Hy Heath †	McCartney	1969	2021	
"Take This Hammer"	The Beatles: Get Back	Traditional †	–	1969	2021	
"Taking a Trip to Carolina"	The Beatles: Get Back	Starkey	Starr	1969	2021	
"Tea for Two"	The Beatles: Get Back	Vincent Youmans; Irving Caesar †	McCartney	1969	2021	
"Thinking of Linking"	The Beatles: Get Back	McCartney	McCartney	1969	2021	
"Too Bad About Sorrow"	The Beatles: Get Back	Lennon; McCartney	Lennon; McCartney	1969	2021	
"Twenty Flight Rock"	The Beatles: Get Back	Eddie Cochran; Ned Fairchild †	–	1969	2021	
"What Do You Want to Make Those Eyes at Me For?"	The Beatles: Get Back	James V. Monaco; Joseph McCarthy; Howard Johnson †	–	1969	2021	
"Window, Window"	The Beatles: Get Back	Harrison	Harrison	1969	2021	
"Woman"	The Beatles: Get Back	McCartney	McCartney	1969	2021	
"Won't You Please Say Goodbye"	The Beatles: Get Back	Lennon; McCartney	Lennon; McCartney	1969	2021	
"You Are My Sunshine"	The Beatles: Get Back	Disputed †	–	1969	2021	
"You Wear Your Women Out"	The Beatles: Get Back	Lennon; McCartney; Harrison; Starkey	Instrumental	1969	2021	
"You Win Again"	The Beatles: Get Back	Hank Williams †	Lennon; Ono	1969	2021	
"You're My World"	The Beatles: Get Back	Umberto Bindi; Gino Paoli; Carl Sigman †	Starkey	1969	2021	

== Unreleased songs ==
Name of song, year of origin and notes
Song	Year	Notes
"Be-Bop-a-Lula"	1962	Performed live at the Star-Club.
"Carnival of Light"	1967	Nearly 14-minute-long experimental collage recorded on 5 January 1967 for The Million Volt Light and Sound Rave. In 1996, McCartney attempted to include "Carnival of Light" on Anthology 2, but was vetoed by Harrison, Starr and Ono (as Lennon's widow). The track was once again excluded from Anthology 4 in 2025.
"Catswalk"	1960	Written around 1960, it was rehearsed multiple times before 1963 and only properly recorded in 1962 at a rehearsal at The Cavern Club.
"Etcetera"	1968	Demo recorded by McCartney on 20 August 1968, during the same session as "Mother Nature's Son" and "Wild Honey Pie".
"Falling in Love Again (Can't Help It)"	1962	Performed live at the Star-Club.
"I Remember You"	1962	Performed live at the Star-Club.
"I'll Wait Till Tomorrow"	1960	Country-influenced duet briefly performed by Lennon and McCartney during the Get Back sessions on 3 January 1969.
"I've Been Thinking That You Love Me"	1960	Briefly performed during the Get Back sessions on 3 January 1969.
"I Wish I Could Shimmy Like My Sister Kate"	1962	Performed live at the Star-Club.
"Little Queenie"	1962	Performed live at the Star-Club.
"Looking Glass"	1960	An instrumental written around 1960. Along with "Winston's Walk", it is unknown if it was ever properly recorded. According to Walter Everett, "Looking Glass" is only known from a mention in a letter written by McCartney to a local journalist. The song was mentioned in 1969 film outtakes from the Get Back sessions, but it is unknown whether the song was actually recorded during the sessions.
"Love of the Loved"	1962	Played by the Beatles during their failed audition for Decca Records in early 1962. Released as a single by Cilla Black in 1963.
"Red Hot"	1962	Performed live at the Star-Club.
"Pinwheel Twist"	1962	Performed live in 1962.
"Red Sails in the Sunset"	1962	Performed live at the Star-Club.
"Reminiscing"	1962	Buddy Holly cover; performed live at the Star-Club.
"September in the Rain"	1962	Played by the Beatles during their failed audition for Decca Records in early 1962.
"Sheila"	1962	Performed live at the Star-Club.
"Shirley's Wild Accordion"	1967	Recorded on 12 October 1967; instrumental intended for Magical Mystery Tour film.
"Take Good Care of My Baby"	1962	Played by the Beatles during their failed audition for Decca Records in early 1962.
"Too Bad About Sorrows"	1957	Written during the days of the Quarrymen, "Too Bad About Sorrows" is one of the earliest Lennon–McCartney compositions. Briefly sung by Lennon during the Get Back sessions on 8 January 1969; sung by McCartney during the same sessions on 21 January 1969.
"Watching Rainbows"	1969	Performed on 14 January 1969 during the Get Back sessions with Lennon on lead vocals.
"Where Have You Been (All My Life)"	1962	Performed live at the Star-Club.
"Winston's Walk"	1960	An instrumental written around 1960. Along with "Looking Glass", it is unknown if the song was ever properly recorded. According to Walter Everett, "Winston's Walk" is only known from a mention in a letter written by McCartney to a local journalist.
"Your Feet's Too Big"	1962	Performed live at the Star-Club.

== See also ==
- The Beatles albums discography
- The Beatles singles discography
- Outline of the Beatles
- The Beatles timeline
