= Kum Back =

1970 bootleg studio album by The Beatles

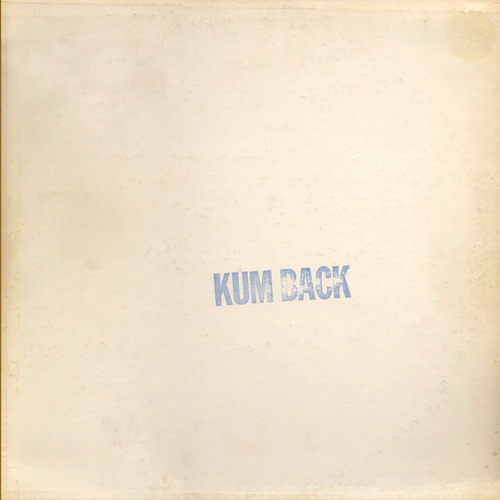

Studio album (bootleg) by the Beatles
- Released: January 1970
- Recorded: 22–28 January 1969
- Studio: Apple, London
- Genre: Rock
- Length: 38:33

Kum Back is the first bootleg album by the Beatles, released in January 1970. The album is an early version of what would become Let It Be, sourced from a tape recording of an acetate prepared by the band's engineer, Glyn Johns. It is one of the earliest commercial rock bootlegs, the first being Great White Wonder by Bob Dylan which was released several months earlier.

== Background ==
In January 1969, the Beatles began rehearsing new songs at Twickenham Film Studios for a planned concert to be recorded and released as a television special and album. From the start, the project was hindered by disagreements, indecision and tensions within the group, culminating in George Harrison's temporary departure from the band. Harrison returned after a few days and rehearsals were moved to their new studio located in the basement of Apple headquarters at 3 Savile Row. Unlike Twickenham, these sessions were recorded on multitrack tape recorders. After the first week of rehearsals at Apple, Glyn Johns had an idea for an album giving the listener a "fly on the wall" insight into the Beatles at work in the studio. He mixed several tracks and made acetates for each Beatle to listen to and the response to his idea was a "resounding no".

In early March, John Lennon and Paul McCartney asked Johns to assemble an album from the tapes. Johns stayed with his earlier "fly on the wall" idea, selecting several early rehearsal takes of some songs for the album. Johns completed mixing and assembling the album, to be titled Get Back, in May 1969. The album was scheduled for release that July; but with their next album, Abbey Road, already underway and the accompanying film unfinished, it was pushed back until December.

== Sources ==
On 12 September 1969, John Lennon, along with the Plastic Ono Band, travelled to Canada to perform at the Toronto Rock and Roll Revival. Later that month several radio stations in the U.S. began broadcasting recordings of the Beatles' unreleased Get Back album. It was rumored at the time that Lennon had given an acetate or tape copy to a reporter who in turn gave it to a disc jockey. Lennon later said: "They say it came from an acetate that I gave to someone who then went and broadcast it as being an advance pressing or something."

WBCN in Boston was one of the first radio stations to air the recording. The station obtained a reel-to-reel copy of Johns' January acetate and broadcast it in its entirety on 22 September 1969. A recording of the WBCN broadcast became the source for the Kum Back bootleg LP.

However, WBCN was not the first station to air the unreleased recordings. WKBW in Buffalo, New York, broadcast a recording of Johns' May 1969 Get Back compilation in its entirety on 20 September 1969. Another broadcast of the Get Back recordings was done by CKLW Windsor, which featured only the song "Let It Be". WIXY in Cleveland also aired the tape in September.

== Release ==
The first copies of the LP appeared in record stores in January 1970. The LP was packaged in a plain white jacket with "Kum Back" rubber-stamped in blue or red ink. Similarly, the record labels are plain white, with no artist or title. The only indication as to which is side one and side two is scratched into the space of the play-out grooves on either side.

Following the release of Kum Back, other bootleg versions of the Beatles' unreleased Get Back album appeared on the market, notably Get Back to Toronto on I.P.F. Records and Get Back on Lemon Records. Sales estimates of Kum Back and related bootlegs were between 7,500 and 15,000 copies.

== Legacy ==
By the time the Beatles' Let It Be album was released in May 1970, remixed and overdubbed by Phil Spector, the original Get Back album was a known commodity. In addition to the bootleg LP and other audio recordings in circulation, Rolling Stone had published a preview of Get Back in its 20 September 1969 issue, describing the band's back-to-basics, no-overdubs approach, including the Please Please Me-style album cover. Generally negative reviews of Let It Be often noted the contrast between the original album and Spector's lavish orchestration. New Musical Express wrote: "the tragedy is that what little remains of the original album is some of the best straight rock the Beatles have recorded in years" and that "almost all of the fun and raw feel has been taken away or polished up by Phil Spector." Rolling Stone complained that Spector "whipped out his orchestra and choir and proceeded to turn several of the rough gems on the best Beatle album in ages into costume jewelry."

The release of Kum Back spurred great interest in previously unreleased Beatles recordings among fans and led to the release of hundreds of bootleg LPs throughout the 1970s.

== Official releases ==
Several tracks included on Kum Back appeared on official releases. "Get Back" was released as a single and on the Let It Be album. "The Long and Winding Road" appeared on Let It Be but with orchestral and choir overdubs added by Phil Spector. The original recording, without overdubs, appeared on the Anthology 3 album released in 1996. "Teddy Boy" and "I've Got a Feeling" also appeared on Anthology 3. The second of three iterations of Glyn Johns mix of Let it Be was officially released in full as part of the 2021 compilation album Let It Be: Special Edition.

== Track listing ==
All tracks are written by Lennon–McCartney unless otherwise noted.

Side one
No.	Title	Recording date	Length
1.	"Get Back"	27 January	2:51
2.	"The Walk" (Jimmy McCracklin)	27 January	0:59
3.	"Let It Be"	26 January	4:06
4.	"Teddy Boy" (Paul McCartney)	24 January	5:56
5.	"Two of Us"	24 January	3:58

Side two
No.	Title	Recording date	Length
6.	"Don't Let Me Down"	22 January	3:55
7.	"I've Got a Feeling"	23 January	3:01
8.	"The Long and Winding Road"	26 January	3:47
9.	"For You Blue" (George Harrison)	25 January	3:06
10.	"Dig a Pony"	23 January	4:06
11.	"Get Back (Reprise)"	28 January	3:01

== Personnel ==
- John Lennon: Rhythm guitar, acoustic guitar, lead guitar, bass guitar, lap steel guitar, harmony vocal, lead vocal
- Paul McCartney: Bass guitar, acoustic guitar, piano, lead vocal, harmony vocal
- George Harrison: Lead guitar, rhythm guitar, lead vocal
- Ringo Starr: Drums
- Billy Preston: Electric piano

== See also ==
- The Beatles' bootleg recordings
- The Beatles' recording sessions § Get Back Sessions
- Let It Be
