= Watching Rainbows =

Unreleased song by the Beatles

Song by the Beatles
- Released: Unreleased
- Recorded: 14 January 1969
- Studio: Twickenham Studios
- Length: 4:08
- Songwriter: Lennon–McCartney
- Producer: George Martin

"Watching Rainbows" is an unreleased song by the Beatles, recorded on 14 January 1969 during the Get Back sessions at Twickenham Studios. It features John Lennon on lead vocal and electric piano, Paul McCartney on electric guitar, and Ringo Starr on drums. No bass guitar was present as McCartney was filling in for the absent George Harrison, who had temporarily left the group at that stage of the sessions. The song is played in two chords and has since been compared to "I Am the Walrus" and "I've Got a Feeling" for the similarities in the song's lyrics and structure.

A riff from the song was integrated into the Plastic Ono Band song "Don't Worry Kyoko (Mummy's Only Looking for Her Hand in the Snow)", which was released later in 1969.

== Composition and background ==
"Watching Rainbows" is an improvised song written by John Lennon and credited to Lennon–McCartney. It was never released and can only be heard on bootlegs. The track was recorded at Twickenham Studios on 14 January 1969 by producer George Martin during the Get Back sessions.

"Mean Mr. Mustard" and the unreleased song "Madman" were also recorded during this session, although the Beatles ultimately abandoned them after a few run-throughs. The song features Paul McCartney on lead guitar because George Harrison had temporarily left the group at this stage of the sessions. The song has a two chord riff.

"Watching Rainbows" is very often associated with two other songs by the Beatles. One is the structurally similar McCartney "I've Got a Feeling", which the Beatles released on their final album Let It Be on 8 May 1970. The other one is the single, "I Am the Walrus", which had been released on 24 November 1967, as the B-side of the hit single "Hello, Goodbye".

One of the most intelligible pieces of lyric in the song is the oft-repeated line "Standing in the garden, waiting for the sun to shine", reminiscent of a line from the earlier Beatles tune, which contains the line "Sitting in an English garden, waiting for the sun." The lyrics also feature the words "shoot me", which Lennon later reused on his hit single "Come Together". It leads into a chorus, but then evolves to a jam. Lyrically, the song is about a man suffering from poverty who doesn't just want to watch rainbows, but make his own. There is also a line concerning a relationship with a mother, which is echoed in Lennon's song "Mother", released by him in 1970.

== Reception ==
In a negative review, author Richie Unterberger dismissed it as "uninteresting" and "chunky", furthermore calling the track a "throw-away". In a positive review, David Marchese of Vulture called the song "another playful, jammy track from the Let It Be sessions".

== Personnel ==
According to Kenneth Womack:

- John Lennon – electric piano, lead vocals
- Paul McCartney – lead guitar
- Ringo Starr – drums
