= The Beatles: 50th Anniversary Edition =

Compilation album by the Beatles
- Released: 9 November 2018
- Recorded: 30 May – 14 October 1968
- Studios: EMI and Trident, London
- Length: 699:40
- Label: Apple
- Producers: George Martin (Original recordings); Giles Martin (Remix)

The Beatles chronology
The Christmas Records (2017)	The Beatles: 50th Anniversary Edition (2018)	Abbey Road: 50th Anniversary Edition (2019)

The Beatles: 50th Anniversary Edition is an expanded reissue of the 1968 double album The Beatles (also known as "the White Album") by the English rock band the Beatles. It was released in November 2018 to coincide with the 50th anniversary of the original album. It includes a new stereo remix of the album by Sam Okell and Giles Martin, the son of Beatles producer George Martin who had died in 2016.

== Background and content ==
The remixed and expanded editions of The Beatles were released on 9 November 2018. These sets feature 50 previously unreleased studio recordings, in addition to the Esher demos recorded at Harrison's house. The four editions are a three-CD deluxe set, containing the original double album and one CD of demos recorded at Kinfauns, George Harrison's house in Esher; a seven-disc super deluxe edition, which adds three CDs of outtakes and a Blu-ray disc; a two-LP edition, comprising the original release; and a four-LP edition, two discs of which contain Esher demos. Following the announcement of these editions in September, a preview containing three versions of "Back in the U.S.S.R." was released on Spotify and iTunes.

== Reception ==
Jordan Orlando of The New Yorker writes that the 2018 remix "reveals what might be called the greatest record ever made, not only in terms of its innovation and its strange, impenetrable, endlessly suggestive beauty but also because of its place at the apex of the Beatles’ career and its role as an aesthetic keystone for nearly all the rock-and-roll recordings that have followed". He additionally comments that "Rebuilt digitally, the album’s enormous soundscape is finally complete: the progressive generational muddiness is gone, revealing the dry snap of Ringo’s snare and Harrison’s full-throated gentle weeping and the thunderous effervescence of McCartney’s bass runs and Lennon’s halting intakes of breath."

On Metacritic, the super deluxe edition receives an aggregate score of 100/100, based on 11 reviews – which the website defines as indicating "universal acclaim".

== Track listings ==
=== Remix of original album ===
All tracks are written by Lennon–McCartney, except where otherwise indicated.

Side one
No.	Title	Lead vocals	Length
1.	"Back in the U.S.S.R."	McCartney	2:43
2.	"Dear Prudence"	Lennon	3:56
3.	"Glass Onion"	Lennon	2:18
4.	"Ob-La-Di, Ob-La-Da"	McCartney	3:08
5.	"Wild Honey Pie"	McCartney	0:52
6.	"The Continuing Story of Bungalow Bill"	Lennon, with Yoko Ono	3:14
7.	"While My Guitar Gently Weeps" (George Harrison)	Harrison	4:45
8.	"Happiness Is a Warm Gun"	Lennon	2:47
Total length:			23:43

Side two
No.	Title	Lead vocals	Length
1.	"Martha My Dear"	McCartney	2:28
2.	"I'm So Tired"	Lennon	2:03
3.	"Blackbird"	McCartney	2:18
4.	"Piggies" (Harrison)	Harrison	2:04
5.	"Rocky Raccoon"	McCartney	3:33
6.	"Don't Pass Me By" (Richard Starkey)	Starr	3:51
7.	"Why Don't We Do It in the Road?"	McCartney	1:41
8.	"I Will"	McCartney	1:46
9.	"Julia"	Lennon	2:57
Total length:			22:41

Side three
No.	Title	Lead vocals	Length
1.	"Birthday"	McCartney with Lennon	2:42
2.	"Yer Blues"	Lennon	4:01
3.	"Mother Nature's Son"	McCartney	2:48
4.	"Everybody's Got Something to Hide Except Me and My Monkey"	Lennon	2:24
5.	"Sexy Sadie"	Lennon	3:15
6.	"Helter Skelter"	McCartney	4:30
7.	"Long, Long, Long" (Harrison)	Harrison	3:08
Total length:			22:48

Side four
No.	Title	Lead vocals	Length
1.	"Revolution 1"	Lennon	4:15
2.	"Honey Pie"	McCartney	2:41
3.	"Savoy Truffle" (Harrison)	Harrison	2:54
4.	"Cry Baby Cry"	Lennon, with McCartney	3:02
5.	"Revolution 9"	Speaking from Lennon, Harrison, Ono and George Martin	8:15
6.	"Good Night"	Starr	3:14
Total length:			24:21

=== 50th Anniversary Edition bonus tracks ===
CD 3: Esher Demos

All tracks are written by Lennon–McCartney, except where otherwise indicated.

Side one
No.	Title	Writer(s)	Length
1.	"Back in the U.S.S.R."		2:59
2.	"Dear Prudence"		4:47
3.	"Glass Onion"		1:55
4.	"Ob-La-Di, Ob-La-Da"		3:10
5.	"The Continuing Story of Bungalow Bill"		2:40
6.	"While My Guitar Gently Weeps"	Harrison	2:41
Total length:			18:15

Side two
No.	Title	Writer(s)	Length
1.	"Happiness Is a Warm Gun"		1:55
2.	"I'm So Tired"		3:10
3.	"Blackbird"		2:34
4.	"Piggies"	Harrison	2:05
5.	"Rocky Raccoon"		2:44
6.	"Julia"		3:56
7.	"Yer Blues"		3:31
Total length:			19:58

Side three
No.	Title	Writer(s)	Length
1.	"Mother Nature's Son"		2:24
2.	"Everybody's Got Something to Hide Except Me and My Monkey"		3:03
3.	"Sexy Sadie"		2:26
4.	"Revolution"		4:06
5.	"Honey Pie"		1:59
6.	"Cry Baby Cry"		2:27
7.	"Sour Milk Sea"	Harrison	3:43
Total length:			20:13

Side four
No.	Title	Writer(s)	Length
1.	"Junk"	Paul McCartney	2:36
2.	"Child of Nature"	John Lennon	2:37
3.	"Circles"	Harrison	2:16
4.	"Mean Mr. Mustard"		2:05
5.	"Polythene Pam"		1:26
6.	"Not Guilty"	Harrison	3:05
7.	"What's the New Mary Jane"		2:42
Total length:			16:51

CD 4: Sessions
No.	Title	Writer(s)	Length
1.	"Revolution 1" (take 18)		10:28
2.	"A Beginning" (take 4) / "Don't Pass Me By" (take 7)	George Martin / Starkey	5:05
3.	"Blackbird" (take 28)		2:15
4.	"Everybody's Got Something to Hide Except Me and My Monkey" (unnumbered rehearsal)		2:43
5.	"Good Night" (unnumbered rehearsal)		0:39
6.	"Good Night" (take 10 with a guitar part from take 5)		2:31
7.	"Good Night" (take 22)		3:46
8.	"Ob-La-Di, Ob-La-Da" (take 3)		2:54
9.	"Revolution" (unnumbered rehearsal)		2:16
10.	"Revolution" (take 14 / instrumental backing track)		3:25
11.	"Cry Baby Cry" (unnumbered rehearsal)		3:02
12.	"Helter Skelter" (first version / take 2)		12:53
Total length:			51:57

CD 5: Sessions
No.	Title	Writer(s)	Length
1.	"Sexy Sadie" (take 3)		3:08
2.	"While My Guitar Gently Weeps" (acoustic version / take 2)	Harrison	3:02
3.	"Hey Jude" (take 1)		6:44
4.	"Saint Louis Blues" (studio jam)	W. C. Handy	0:51
5.	"Not Guilty" (take 102)	Harrison	4:28
6.	"Mother Nature's Son" (take 15)		3:11
7.	"Yer Blues" (take 5 with guide vocal)		3:57
8.	"What's the New Mary Jane" (take 1)		2:06
9.	"Rocky Raccoon" (take 8)		4:57
10.	"Back in the U.S.S.R." (take 5 / instrumental backing track)		3:09
11.	"Dear Prudence" (vocal, guitar & drums)		3:59
12.	"Let It Be" (unnumbered rehearsal)		1:17
13.	"While My Guitar Gently Weeps" (third version / take 27)	Harrison	3:17
14.	"(You're So Square) Baby I Don't Care" (studio jam)	Jerry Leiber, Mike Stoller	0:42
15.	"Helter Skelter" (second version / take 17)		3:39
16.	"Glass Onion" (take 10)		2:12
Total length:			50:39

CD 6: Sessions
No.	Title	Writer(s)	Length
1.	"I Will" (take 13)		2:20
2.	"Blue Moon" (studio jam)	Richard Rodgers, Lorenz Hart	1:11
3.	"I Will" (take 29)		0:26
4.	"Step Inside Love" (studio jam)		1:34
5.	"Los Paranoias" (studio jam)	John Lennon, Paul McCartney, George Harrison, Richard Starkey	3:58
6.	"Can You Take Me Back?" (take 1)		2:22
7.	"Birthday" (take 2 / instrumental backing track)		2:40
8.	"Piggies" (take 12 / instrumental backing track)	Harrison	2:10
9.	"Happiness Is a Warm Gun" (take 19)		3:09
10.	"Honey Pie" (instrumental backing track)		2:43
11.	"Savoy Truffle" (instrumental backing track)	Harrison	2:56
12.	"Martha My Dear" (without brass & strings)		2:29
13.	"Long, Long, Long" (take 44)	Harrison	2:54
14.	"I'm So Tired" (take 7)		2:29
15.	"I'm So Tired" (take 14)		2:17
16.	"The Continuing Story of Bungalow Bill" (take 2)		3:12
17.	"Why Don't We Do It in the Road?" (take 5)		2:03
18.	"Julia" (two rehearsals)		4:31
19.	"The Inner Light" (take 6 / instrumental backing track)	Harrison	2:47
20.	"Lady Madonna" (take 2 / piano and drums)		2:25
21.	"Lady Madonna" (backing vocals from take 3)		0:54
22.	"Across the Universe" (take 6)		3:52
Total length:			55:22

Disc 7: Blu-ray audio
No.	Title	Length
1.	"The Beatles PCM Stereo (2018 Stereo Mix)"	93:33
2.	"The Beatles DTS-HD Master Audio 5.1 (2018)"	93:33
3.	"The Beatles Dolby True HD 5.1 (2018)"	93:33
4.	"The Beatles Mono (2018 Direct Transfer of ‘The White Album’ Original Mono Mix)"	92:28
Total length:		6:13:07

== Personnel ==
- Giles Martin – mixing supervisor
- Sam Okell - mix engineer

== Charts ==
2018 weekly chart performance for The Beatles: 50th Anniversary Edition
Chart (2018)	Peak position
Canadian Albums (Billboard)	9
German Albums (Offizielle Top 100)	3
Polish Albums (ZPAV)	44
Spanish Albums (Promusicae)	7
Swedish Albums (Sverigetopplistan)	1
US Billboard 200	6

== See also ==
- Outline of the Beatles
- The Beatles timeline
