= The Continuing Story of Bungalow Bill =

1968 song by the Beatles

- 1968 sheet music cover, published by Sonora

Song by the Beatles

from the album The Beatles
- Released: 22 November 1968
- Recorded: 8 October 1968
- Studio: EMI, London
- Genre: Folk
- Length: 3:13
- Label: Apple
- Songwriter: Lennon–McCartney
- Producer: George Martin

Licensed audio
- "The Continuing Story of Bungalow Bill" on YouTube

"The Continuing Story of Bungalow Bill" is a song by the English rock band the Beatles from their 1968 album The Beatles (the White Album). A folk song, it was written by John Lennon during the band's visit to India in 1968, after a man left Maharishi Mahesh Yogi's Transcendental Meditation course to go shoot tigers. It was recorded in demo form in May 1968, and again on 8 October during sessions for the White Album. The basic recording was completed in three takes; it was produced by George Martin and engineered by Ken Scott.

"The Continuing Story of Bungalow Bill" was released on 22 November 1968 as part of the White Album. It received mixed reviews from music critics, who viewed it as one of the Beatles' more eccentric songs while others commented on its playful tone. It often ranks towards the middle of critical rankings of the band's discography. The American rock band Phish performed a live cover of "The Continuing Story of Bungalow" in 1994, including it on their album Live Phish Volume 13 (2002).

== Background and recording ==
During their stay in Rishikesh, India, in 1968, the Beatles began writing material for their ninth studio album, The Beatles (the White Album). Most of the material was composed while studying Transcendental Meditation under Maharishi Mahesh Yogi. John Lennon wrote "The Continuing Story of Bungalow Bill" after a man took a break from the meditation course for a few weeks to shoot tigers. (Note: While written by Lennon, the song was credited to the Lennon–McCartney songwriting partnership.) While constructing the composition, Lennon was musically inspired by Nat King Cole's version of the 1934 song "Stay as Sweet as You Are". He reportedly came up with the name "Bungalow Bill" by combining the character Jungle Jim with the American soldier Buffalo Bill.

The band recorded an early demo of "The Continuing Story of Bungalow Bill" in May 1968 at George Harrison's home, Kinfauns. It was recorded as part of the "Esher tapes" alongside 23 other demos. The band later went into EMI Studio Two on 8 October 1968 to record "The Continuing Story of Bungalow Bill" for the White Album. George Martin produced it, and Ken Scott engineered it. According to the chroniclers Jean-Michel Guesdon and Philippe Margotin, it was "an opportunity for everyone in Studio Two to participate in a Beatles song by singing the chorus". Lennon and Harrison recorded the rhythm track on acoustic guitars, while Paul McCartney and Ringo Starr participated on bass and drums, respectively. Chris Thomas played mellotron on the track, and backing vocals were contributed by Yoko Ono and Maureen Starkey. Historian Mark Lewisohn referred to the track's recording session as a "free-for-all". The track was recorded in three takes, followed by overdubbing. "The Continuing Story of Bungalow Bill" became the first Beatles song to have a female lead vocal line—that was recorded by Ono. The final song was completed in mono and stereo mixing on 9 October. "The Continuing Story of Bungalow Bill" was one of the last songs recorded for the album, being followed by "Why Don't We Do It in the Road?" and "Julia".

== Musical structure ==
"The Continuing Story of Bungalow Bill" was referred to by author Kevin Courrier as a "sing-along ballad"; it has been considered a folk song. It is in 2/4 time and employs a shifting key, changing between C major, A major, and A minor. The song includes an opening refrain followed by a verse, followed by two more refrains and a cut-off outro. The guitar solo that opens the song involves all seven notes of the Phrygian mode, including a Spanish-sounding ♭II, a natural seventh from the harmonic minor scale, and a blues-sounding ♭V. The verse, made up of 12 bars, runs at a slower tempo than the refrain. Following the solo is the chorus in C major, shifting between V (G on "Bungalow") and iv (Fm on "what did you"). A bridge in the relative minor key comes next, starting with Am (on "He went out") and then shifting to ♭VI (F on "elephant") and ♭VII (G on "gun"). Lennon then uses a V (E on "all-American"), ♭VII (G on "bullet-headed"), i (Am on "Saxon-mother's"), and ♭VI (Fm on "son") to get back to C major. According to the musicologist Alan W. Pollack, "4.8 iterations" of the refrain feature in the outro, before the track leads into "While My Guitar Gently Weeps".

== Release and critical reception ==
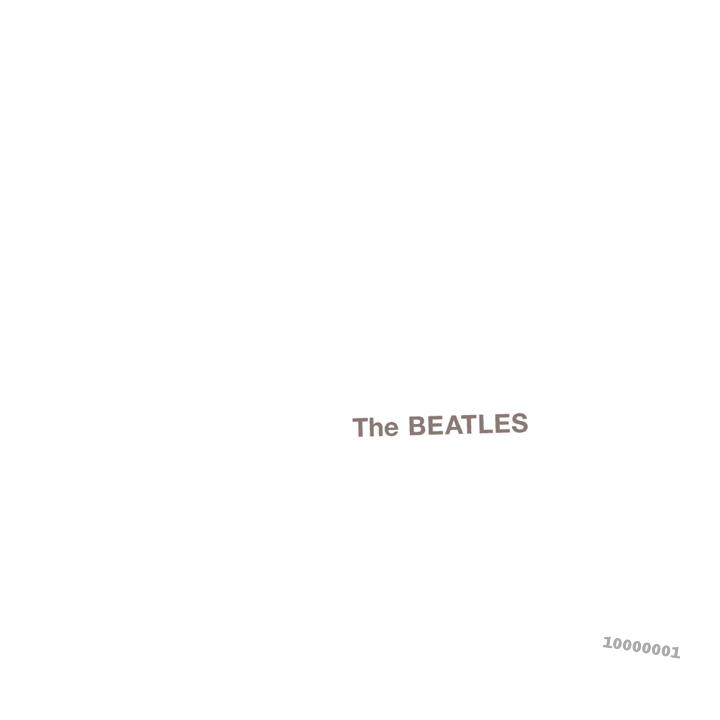
"The Continuing Story of Bungalow Bill" was first released on The Beatles, commonly known as the White Album.

"The Continuing Story of Bungalow Bill" was sequenced as the sixth track on the White Album, between "Wild Honey Pie" and "While My Guitar Gently Weeps". Apple Records released the album on 22 November 1968 in the United Kingdom and three days later in the United States. The Esher demo, along with the second take of "The Continuing Story of Bungalow Bill", were released on the 50th anniversary reissue of the White Album in November 2018. The American rock band Phish included a cover of the song on their 2002 album Live Phish Volume 13, a live performance of the whole White Album.

"The Continuing Story of Bungalow Bill" has received mixed reviews from music critics. In a contemporary review, an anonymous writer for Record Mirror commented on the "strange vibrations" provided by Lennon on the album, and classified "The Continuing Story of Bungalow Bill" as "a drama about hero Bungalow Bill", additionally referring to the song as "a myriad of beats enclosed". Alan Smith of NME stated "The Continuing Story of Bungalow Bill" had a "strong melody line"; meanwhile Melody Maker's Alan Walsh called it a "macabre singalong". Jann Wenner of Rolling Stone identified "The Continuing Story of Bungalow Bill" as "the mode of the Saturday afternoon kiddie shows".

Jim Beviglia, writing for American Songwriter, referred to it as "one of the Beatles' weirder songs", while Ian MacDonald called it a "tub-thumping banality". Mark Richardson of Pitchfork simply deemed it as an "iffy joke", pairing it with "Rocky Raccoon" and "Piggies". Journalist Mark Hertsgaard claimed the story behind "The Continuing Story of Bungalow Bill" was "good, acerbic fun". In contrast, scholar Ed Whitley claimed "The Continuing Story of Bungalow Bill" was a "disruption" to the flow of the White Album, calling it "goofy" and "bitingly sarcastic". Todd Burns of Stylus Magazine described "The Continuing Story of Bungalow Bill" as the "obvious counterpoint" to "Everybody's Got Something to Hide Except Me and My Monkey". McCartney stated that "The Continuing Story of Bungalow Bill" was one of his favorites on the White Album.

In retrospective rankings of the Beatles' discography, "The Continuing Story of Bungalow Bill" commonly appears near the middle. It was ranked at number 141 by NME's Mark Beaumont, who called it a "charming tale of bravery". Bill Wyman of Vulture placed it at number 139, and Michael Gallucci of Ultimate Classic Rock listed it at number 174. In 2022, Jacob Stolworthy, writing for The Independent, ranked it at number 24 in a review of the White Album, saying it "lingers in the mind as a slice of tone-shifting oddness". Joe Lynch of Billboard placed "The Continuing Story of Bungalow Bill" at number 20 in a review of the album, praising Lennon's vocals and calling it a "catchy folk sing-along".

== Personnel ==
According to Ian MacDonald, except where noted:

The Beatles

- John Lennon – lead vocal, acoustic guitar, organ
- Paul McCartney – backing vocals, bass guitar
- George Harrison – backing vocals, acoustic guitar
- Ringo Starr – backing vocals, drums, tambourine

Additional musicians

- Chris Thomas – mellotron, backing vocals
- Yoko Ono – vocal, backing vocals
- Maureen Starkey and others – backing vocals
