= Git (slang) =

Mildly pejorative British English slang term

Git /ɡɪt/ is a term of insult denoting an unpleasant, silly, incompetent, annoying, senile, elderly, or childish person. As a mild oath it is roughly on a par with prat and marginally less pejorative than berk. Typically a good-natured admonition with a strong implication of familiarity, git is more severe than twit or idiot but less severe than wanker, arsehole or twat when offence is intended.

The word git first appeared in print in 1946, but is undoubtedly older. It was popularly used by the British army in the First World War at Gallipoli, the Egyptian and Mesopotamian campaigns, where the British would abuse their Turkish adversaries by shouting the vulgar phrase Siktir git! Gülücüklü. (Fuck off! [lit. 'Get fucked and go!'] You smile-faced.), mistakenly believing that git ("go!") was part of the offensive expression.

An alternative suggestion for the etymology is that it is an alteration of the word get, dating back to the 14th century. A shortening of beget, get insinuates that the recipient is someone's misbegotten offspring and therefore a bastard. In parts of northern England, Northern Ireland and Scotland get is still used in preference to git.

The word has been ruled by the Speaker of the House of Commons to be unparliamentary language.

== Notable usage ==
John Lennon calls Walter Raleigh "such a stupid get" in The Beatles song, "I'm So Tired".

In the BBC TV comedy show Till Death Us Do Part (1965-1975) the bigoted patriarch of the family, Alf Garnett (played by Warren Mitchell) repeatedly referred to his son-in-law, Mike Rawlins (Anthony Booth) as a "randy scouse git". The phrase was later picked up by Micky Dolenz and used as the title of a song recorded by The Monkees in 1967. The song "Randy Scouse Git" was the first song written by Dolenz to be commercially released, and it became a number 2 hit in the UK where it was retitled "Alternate Title" after the record company (RCA) complained that the original title (which is not heard in the song itself) was actually somewhat "taboo to the British audience".

In comedy show Monty Python's Flying Circus, a sketch entitled "Mr and Mrs Git" features a couple at a cocktail party named A Snivelling Little Rat-Faced Git and Dreary Fat Boring Old Git. The humour comes as the couple makes small talk about the societal difficulties of having Git as a surname, while appearing oblivious to the more obvious issues of their absurd given names and other repulsive behaviours which are gradually revealed through the conversation. American punk rock band the Gits derived its name from the sketch.

The word "git" is frequently used as an insult in British sitcoms such as Only Fools and Horses, Blackadder and Red Dwarf.

It was in a self-mocking spirit that Linus Torvalds named his Git version control system.
