= Abbey Road: 50th Anniversary Edition =

Compilation album by the Beatles
- Released: 27 September 2019
- Recorded: 22 February – 20 August 1969
- Studios: EMI, Olympic and Trident, London
- Length: 183:30
- Label: Apple
- Producers: George Martin (Original recordings); Giles Martin (Remix)

The Beatles chronology
The Beatles: 50th Anniversary Edition (2018)	Abbey Road: 50th Anniversary Edition (2019)	The Singles Collection (2019)

Abbey Road: 50th Anniversary Edition is an expanded reissue of the 1969 album Abbey Road by the English rock band the Beatles. It was released in September 2019 to coincide with the 50th anniversary of the original album. It includes a new stereo remix of the album by Giles Martin, the son of Beatles producer George Martin.

== Background and content ==
The box set was released on 27 September 2019. Presented with new mixes in stereo, 5.1 surround, and Dolby Atmos, expanded with previously unreleased session recordings and demos, the anniversary releases include a four-disc set, three-LP vinyl set, a two-CD set, a limited-edition picture disc, single CD and LP releases, and digital and streaming. On 26 September 2019, the Beatles YouTube channel premiered a music video for "Here Comes the Sun" in its 2019 remix to promote the 50th anniversary of the album and the anniversary edition.

On Metacritic, the deluxe version receives an aggregate score of 99/100, based on 10 reviews – which the website defines as indicating "universal acclaim".

== Track listings ==
=== New stereo mix of original album ===
All tracks are written by Lennon–McCartney, except where noted.

Side one
No.	Title	Writer(s)	Lead vocals	Length
1.	"Come Together"		Lennon	4:19
2.	"Something"	George Harrison	Harrison	3:02
3.	"Maxwell's Silver Hammer"		McCartney	3:27
4.	"Oh! Darling"		McCartney	3:27
5.	"Octopus's Garden"	Richard Starkey	Starr	2:51
6.	"I Want You (She's So Heavy)"		Lennon	7:47
Total length:				24:53

Side two
No.	Title	Writer(s)	Lead vocals	Length
1.	"Here Comes the Sun"	Harrison	Harrison	3:05
2.	"Because"		Lennon, McCartney and Harrison	2:45
3.	"You Never Give Me Your Money"		McCartney	4:03
4.	"Sun King"		Lennon, with McCartney and Harrison	2:26
5.	"Mean Mr. Mustard"		Lennon	1:06
6.	"Polythene Pam"		Lennon	1:13
7.	"She Came In Through the Bathroom Window"		McCartney	1:58
8.	"Golden Slumbers"		McCartney	1:31
9.	"Carry That Weight"		McCartney, with Lennon, Harrison and Starr	1:36
10.	"The End"		McCartney	2:05
11.	"Her Majesty" (hidden track)		McCartney	0:23
Total length:				22:10

=== Super Deluxe edition tracks ===
All tracks are written by Lennon–McCartney, except where otherwise indicated.

Side one
No.	Title	Writer(s)	Length
1.	"I Want You (She's So Heavy)" (Trident recording session and reduction mix)		6:59
2.	"Goodbye" (home demo)		2:23
3.	"Something" (studio demo)	Harrison	3:37
4.	"The Ballad of John and Yoko" (take 7)		3:37
5.	"Old Brown Shoe" (take 2)	Harrison	3:15

Side two
No.	Title	Writer(s)	Length
1.	"Oh! Darling" (take 4)		3:30
2.	"Octopus's Garden" (take 9)	Starkey	1:43
3.	"You Never Give Me Your Money" (take 36)		5:17
4.	"Her Majesty" (takes 1–3)		1:33
5.	"Golden Slumbers / Carry That Weight" (takes 1–3)		3:20
6.	"Here Comes the Sun" (take 9)	Harrison	3:40
7.	"Maxwell's Silver Hammer" (take 12)		4:44
Total length:			43:38

Side three
No.	Title	Writer(s)	Length
1.	"Come Together" (take 5)		3:30
2.	"The End" (take 3)		2:11
3.	"Come and Get It" (studio demo)	Paul McCartney	2:42
4.	"Sun King" (take 20)		3:14
5.	"Mean Mr. Mustard" (take 20)		1:34
6.	"Polythene Pam" (take 27)		1:39
7.	"She Came In Through the Bathroom Window" (take 27)		1:39
8.	"Because" (take 1 / instrumental)		3:07

Side four
No.	Title	Writer(s)	Length
1.	"The Long One" (trial edit and mix—30 July 1969): I. "You Never Give Me Your Money"; II. "Sun King"; III. "Mean Mr. Mustard"; IV. "Her Majesty"; V. "Polythene Pam"; VI. "She Came In Through the Bathroom Window"; VII. "Golden Slumbers"; VIII. "Carry That Weight"; IX. "The End"		16:10
2.	"Something" (take 39 / instrumental / strings only)	Harrison	2:41
3.	"Golden Slumbers / Carry That Weight" (take 17 / instrumental / strings & brass only)		3:17
Total length:			41:44

== Personnel ==
- Giles Martin – producer
- Sam Okell – mix engineer
- Miles Showell – stereo mastering engineer
- Matthew Cocker – transfer engineer
- Stefano Civetta – mix assistant
- Simon Gibson – audio restoration
- Adam Sharp – project management

== Charts ==
Chart performance for Abbey Road: 50th Anniversary Edition
Chart (2019)	Peak position
Australian Albums (ARIA)	2
Belgian Albums (Ultratop Flanders)	1
Belgian Albums (Ultratop Wallonia)	4
Canadian Albums (Billboard)	3
Czech Albums (ČNS IFPI)	23
Danish Albums (Hitlisten)	3
Dutch Albums (Album Top 100)	1
Finnish Albums (Suomen virallinen lista)	13
German Albums (Offizielle Top 100)	2
Greek Albums (Billboard)	2
Hungarian Albums (MAHASZ)	34
Irish Albums (IRMA)	3
Italian Albums (FIMI)	3
Mexican Albums (AMPROFON)	5
New Zealand Albums (RMNZ)	6
Norwegian Albums (VG-lista)	2
Polish Albums (ZPAV)	16
Portuguese Albums (AFP)	1
Scottish Albums (Official Charts)	1
Spanish Albums (PROMUSICAE)	1
Swedish Albums (Sverigetopplistan)	4
Swiss Albums (Schweizer Hitparade)	3
UK Albums (Official Charts)	1
US Billboard 200	3
US Top Rock Albums (Billboard)	1

== See also ==
- Outline of the Beatles
- The Beatles timeline
