= Madman (Beatles song) =

Song by the Beatles
- Recorded: 14, 21 January 1969
- Genre: Rock
- Length: 3:17
- Songwriter: Lennon-McCartney

"Madman" is an unfinished song that was recorded by the Beatles in January 1969 during the Get Back sessions.

== Recording ==
Although the song was introduced during the Get Back sessions that would eventually become the Let It Be album, it was never completed at that time. Between the two known recordings of the song during Beatles sessions, Lennon moved the lyrics around and altered its arrangement. A similarity between this song and Lennon's "Mean Mr. Mustard" from the album Abbey Road has been noted.

== Personnel ==
- John Lennon – lead vocal, electric piano
- Paul McCartney – lead guitar
- Ringo Starr – drums
