= Her Majesty (song) =

1969 song by the Beatles

- Northern Songs sheet music cover

Song by the Beatles

from the album Abbey Road
- Released: 26 September 1969 (UK)
- Recorded: 2 July 1969
- Studio: EMI, London
- Genre: Music hall; bagatelle
- Length: 0:23
- Label: Apple
- Songwriters: Paul McCartney, credited to Lennon–McCartney
- Producer: George Martin

Official audio
- "Her Majesty" on YouTube

"Her Majesty" is a song by the English rock band the Beatles, from their 1969 album Abbey Road. Written and sung by Paul McCartney, it is a humorous, somewhat ungracious ode to Queen Elizabeth II of the United Kingdom. McCartney said that he "wrote it as a joke" and that "[it's] almost like a love song to the Queen." The song consists of one lead vocal and an acoustic guitar melody. It appears at the end of Abbey Road twenty seconds after "The End", (Note: The exact duration of the silence varies between different CD versions.) but the original album sleeve did not list it; in fact, some music critics consider it one of the first hidden tracks. Lasting 23 seconds, "Her Majesty" is the shortest Beatles song.

"Her Majesty" was first performed during the Get Back sessions and subsequently recorded on 2 July 1969 in three takes. While intended to be included in the Abbey Road medley between "Mean Mr. Mustard" and "Polythene Pam", McCartney later decided to have it removed. However, the sound engineer John Kurlander had been ordered never to scrap Beatles recordings, so he slipped it into the end of Abbey Road and attached twenty seconds of leader tape before it. McCartney reportedly approved of it in this setting. Because its initial placement was altered, the raucous opening chord of "Her Majesty" is the final one of "Mean Mr. Mustard", and its final chord is to be found at the beginning of "Polythene Pam".

In general Beatles songs rankings, "Her Majesty" often features in the lower half. On the other hand, critics such as Tim Riley praise its placement at the end of Abbey Road, which, in their view, serves to abate the seriousness and grandeur of "The End". McCartney performed the song at Buckingham Palace in 2002.

== Background and recording ==
Paul McCartney wrote "Her Majesty" at his Scotland farm around October 1968, or later. (Note: The song, however, is credited to the Lennon–McCartney songwriting partnership.) He describes its origins: "I was just writing this little tune. I can never tell, like, how tunes come out. I just wrote it as a joke." (Note: Bill Harry and Jean-Michel Guesdon and Philippe Margotin suggest that McCartney wrote "Her Majesty" as a tribute to Queen Elizabeth II.) The song debuted as a two-minute outtake on 24 January 1969 during the Get Back sessions, where McCartney repeatedly sings the verse and performs the guitar melody featuring on the final cut on his Martin D-28. On 2 July, having arrived at the EMI studio before his bandmates, he recorded it. The Beatles historian Mark Lewisohn writes: "A simpler recording could not be imagined: it took just three takes, only two of which were complete, before Paul had it right, singing live to his own acoustic guitar accompaniment." Of the mixing console's eight tracks, only two were used: one for the guitar melody, and the other for the vocal. "Her Majesty" was to be considered for the Abbey Road medley, between "Mean Mr. Mustard" and "Polythene Pam" (Note: The Abbey Road medley was a collection of short songs connected by thematic or tonal coherence.)—"almost as an afterthought", writes the author Hunter Davies.

All takes of "Her Majesty"
- Her Majesty (Takes 1-3) on YouTube

The band did not heed McCartney's recording, and while the Abbey Road tracks were being remixed, on 30 July, he deemed it unfit for the medley and told the sound engineer John Kurlander to scrap it. According to the Beatles historian Kenneth Womack, the "acoustic simplicity" of "Her Majesty" did not suit the medley's vigour when placed amid "Mustard" and "Pam". The musicologist Alan W. Pollack also agrees with McCartney's decision, as its disparate key, mood, and style would have interrupted the medley's flow accumulated since "Mustard". However, Kurlander was under orders not to throw out any Beatles recording. Therefore, he inserted it at the end of Abbey Road after "The End" and stitched twenty seconds' worth of leader tape between the two songs. Kurlander recalls, "I'm only assuming this, but ... [Paul] must have liked hearing 'Her Majesty' tacked on the end. The Beatles always picked up on accidental things. It came as a nice surprise there at the end." (Note: Other writers confirm this course of events.) "Typical Beatles", McCartney said of the final product, "an accident". The track was produced by George Martin and engineered by Phil McDonald and Chris Blair.

== Composition ==
=== General appraisal ===
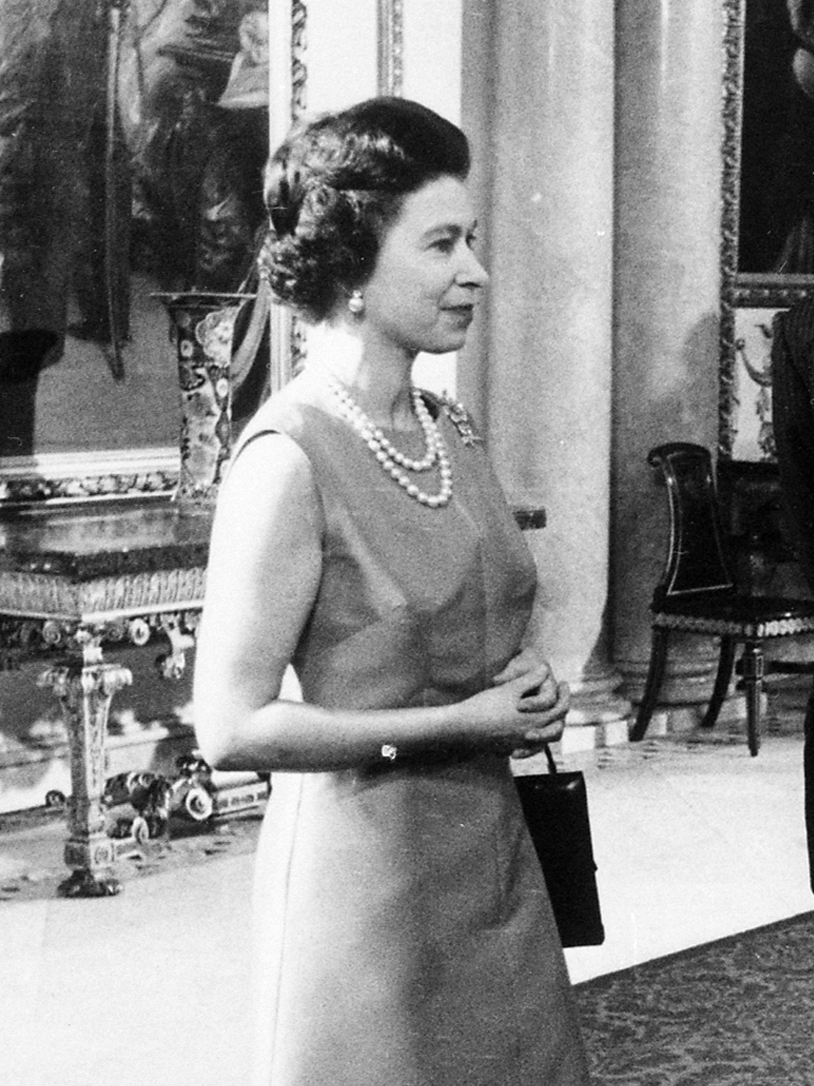
Queen Elizabeth II of the United Kingdom, pictured in 1969

"Her Majesty" is the shortest Beatles song, at 23 seconds. Featuring at the end of Abbey Road as a coda twenty seconds after "The End", (Note: The exact duration of the silence varies between different CD versions.) it is a hidden track: one of the first in history, according to several music writers. (Note: Kenneth Womack argues that the Beatles had previously experimented with hidden tracks on the White Album, which features the unlisted "Can You Take Me Back?".) Years later, "Her Majesty" inspired Kurt Cobain to place "Endless, Nameless", an impromptu cacophany of guitar sounds and screams recorded during a frustrating session, as a hidden track at Nevermind's end. (Note: The music author Chuck Crisafulli writes in greater length about another reason for Cobain's choice: "CDs had been around for a while, but were just then starting to be derided as an artistically and aesthetically unsatisfying format. Cobain decided to bring a little vinyl-era playfulness into the digital age with 'Endless, Nameless', and it wasn't long before every self-respecting 'alternative' band was hiding a bonus track somewhere at the end of their CDs.")

The musicologist Walter Everett describes McCartney's piece as a "brief tongue-in-cheek music hall ditty", (Note: The Beatles biographer Jonathan Gould similarly describes it as a "music-hall ditty".) the music writer Steve Hamelman considers it an "acoustic bagatelle", and Womack calls it a "gentle acoustic paean" to Elizabeth; McCartney, in fact, had copies of Abbey Road sent to her residence at Buckingham Palace. Pollack notes that it injects a tinge of humour in the album following the solemn, sentimental "The End", or, in the critic Tim Riley's words, "pulls the rug from beneath 'The End'." Riley, however, appreciates this effect as he thinks that "The End"'s grand orchestral closing would have sounded too pompous were it to conclude the album. Continuing on the hidden track theme, Matthew Weiner of Stylus agrees that its hiddenness at the album's end works because "The End", which the band knew would be their very last recorded song, comes before it. Hamelman writes of "Her Majesty": "Meaning nothing, it says everything about the Beatles' irreverence, sense of scale, trust in accident, and faith in the listener to get the joke at the end of a career-long hard day's night."

=== Music ===
Just when you think the last recorded Beatles album is over, just as you're letting out a deep sigh in reaction to 'The End', you're startled by one crashing D-Major chord that's followed by this irreverent little fragment of a ditty. Its ending is as abrupt as its start is sudden. Before you've quite had a chance to react to it, it's already altogether come and gone.

— Alan W. Pollack

"Her Majesty" is in the key of D major and in common time. Comprising one lead vocal and an acoustic guitar melody, "[it] doesn't get any simpler than this on a Beatles recording", notes Pollack. It spans eighteen bars, sixteen forming a four-square quatrain and the final two being a short reprise of the last phrase. The song follows the common chord progression I-ii-IV-V, although secondary dominants and a diminished seventh provide some variety. Harmonically, the first phrase has a closed shape, the second is open to V, the third opens on vi and closes on IV, and the final is convergent on the home key. The rhythm remains flexible throughout, but the final phrase sees a rapid succession of chord changes. According to Pollack, "Her Majesty" stylistically "sounds like a strange cross between 'Maxwell's Silver Hammer' and [Mary Hopkin's] 'Goodbye'." Riley writes that the song "travels right to left across the stereo spectrum (a reverse image of the rainbow arc the synthesizer played at the beginning of 'Here Comes the Sun')."

The song opens with a "crashing" D major chord. This, in fact, is the final chord of "Mean Mr. Mustard", which had accidentally been cut out from "Mustard" as John Kurlander's edit was only rough. Similarly, "Her Majesty" abruptly ends with an unresolved note because its final chord is included in the opening of "Polythene Pam", (Note: The final measure, which should have four beats, only contains two, the second being an A natural which remains unsatisfied because two D major beats are missing.) the song it was meant to precede on Abbey Road. These errors were never fixed; when Kurlander tried doing so on 30 July, McCartney told him: "Never mind, it's only a rough mix, it doesn't matter."

=== Lyrics ===
The song concerns a man who is infatuated with Queen Elizabeth II but, at the same time, has reservations about her: "Her Majesty is a pretty nice girl / But she doesn't have a lot to say / Her Majesty is a pretty nice girl / But she changes from day to day." McCartney has said of the lyrics: "It was quite funny because it's basically monarchist, with a mildly disrespectful tone, but it's very tongue in cheek. It's almost like a love song to the Queen." Rolling Stone Brasil questions whether they represent attacks on Elizabeth, but McCartney has recognized her as a force for unity in British society. After meeting Elizabeth to receive his MBE as a Beatle, he said, "She was just like a mum to us." Later, he admitted that he had a crush on her as a child. Womack adds that, at age ten, McCartney penned an essay celebrating Elizabeth's coronation for a school competition. The author Barry Miles comments on the lyrics' significance to the eroding relationships within the band: a few months after McCartney wrote a song in honour of Elizabeth, John Lennon returned his MBE to protest the United Kingdom's support of the United States in the Vietnam War, among other reasons. (Note: The other reasons were, namely, the United Kingdom's involvement in the Nigerian Civil War and the declining commercial performance of his song "Cold Turkey".)

== Release ==
"Her Majesty" was released by Apple Records as part of Abbey Road on 26 September 1969 in the UK, and five days later in the US. The original album cover does not mention its name, but later CD issues do. Since then, the song has been released on the 2003 Anthology DVD and the 50th anniversary expanded edition of Abbey Road, which includes an alternate mix of the medley with "Her Majesty" placed between "Mean Mr. Mustard" and "Polythene Pam". Variety's Chris Willman comments that in this position, "Her Majesty" "stops the [medley's] whole momentum as dead as you'd imagine".

In October 2009, MTV Games released a version of the song for the video game The Beatles: Rock Band that allowed one to play the song's missing last chord. The change garnered controversy among some fans who preferred the original unresolved ending.

== Critical reception ==
On its own, it would have been judged as one of the group's least substantial tracks, though it had a throwaway charm. In its context, however, it was very effective and memorable. For "Her Majesty" was the track that ended the Abbey Road album, in a manner that ensured that people never forgot its existence.

— Richie Unterberger in AllMusic

Alan Smith, in his contemporary review of Abbey Road for the New Musical Express, acknowledges "Her Majesty" as a "split-second thing" sung by McCartney. In lists of the Beatles songs ordered from worst to best, "Her Majesty" was ranked at number 177 by NME's Mark Beaumont, who deems it a "lightweight folk frippery" and throwaway piece, at number 158 by Bill Wyman of Vulture, who similarly describes it as a "McCartney throwaway," and at number 132 by Ultimate Classic Rock, whose Michael Gallucci calls it a "23-second goof" that lightens the end of Abbey Road. (Note: All three use different criteria to decide what qualifies as a Beatles song.)

Matt Miller of Esquire considers it an example of beauty in briefness; despite its jokey "nonsensical nursery rhyme lyrics and a sloppy, out of place first note," he finds it fascinating. Miller also identified the track as an "accident" and a "moment of spontaneity, of playful musicianship stuck in time, of Paul McCartney not trying to do anything more than mess about." Writing for AllMusic, Richie Unterberger highlights the song's startling opening chord, forceful enough "to wake up the dozing cat in the corner," and its ending, as abrupt as though a plug was pulled on the stereo equipment. Billboard's Joe Lynch characterizes "Her Majesty" as "a goofy sketch of a song," comparing the guitar clank at the beginning to the finale of "A Day in the Life". He adds that, despite irking several fans and critics who believed Abbey Road should have ended with the "pristine climax" of "The End", this was part of its charm: "This half-song subverts the seriousness and formality of a proper finale — and ends the Beatles’ career with a reminder that despite everything, the Beatles always walked around with a knowing smirk."

== Live performances and covers ==
McCartney performed "Her Majesty" at Buckingham Palace in June 2002 as part of the celebrations of Elizabeth II's Golden Jubilee. Pearl Jam paid homage to the Queen hours after the announcement of her death by playing a cover of the song during a concert at Scotiabank Arena. "Her Majesty" is one of the least covered Beatles compositions, although such artists as Pearl Jam, Art Brut, and Chumbawamba have recorded their version. Mash-up band Beatallica did a version of "Her Majesty" parodying the Metallica and Lou Reed collaboration "The View".

== Personnel ==
Per Ian MacDonald, Bill Harry, and Hunter Davies:

- Paul McCartney – vocals, acoustic guitar

== Bibliography ==
=== Books and academic sources ===
- Crisafulli, Chuck (1996). Teen Spirit: The Stories Behind Every Nirvana Song. London, England: Omnibus Press. ISBN 0-7119-5809-2.
- Davies, Hunter (2016). The Beatles Book. London, England: Ebury Publishing. ISBN 978-0-09-195863-3.
- Everett, Walter (1999). The Beatles As Musicians: Revolver Through the Anthology. New York City, New York: Oxford University Press. ISBN 0-19-512941-5.
- Gould, Jonathan (2007). Can't Buy Me Love: The Beatles, Britain and America. New York City, New York: Three Rivers Press. ISBN 978-0-307-35338-2.
- Guesdon, Jean-Michel; Margotin, Philippe (2013). All the Songs: The Story Behind Every Beatles Release. New York City, New York: Black Dog & Leventhal Publishers. ISBN 978-1-57912-952-1.
- Hamelman, Steve (2009). "On Their Way Home: The Beatles in 1969 and 1970". In Womack, Kenneth (ed.). The Cambridge Companion to the Beatles. Cambridge, England: Cambridge University Press. ISBN 978-0-521-68976-2.
- Harry, Bill (1992). The Ultimate Beatles Encyclopedia. Great Britain: Virgin Books. ISBN 0-86369-681-3.
- Lewisohn, Mark (1988). The Beatles Recording Sessions. New York City, New York: Harmony Books. ISBN 0-517-57066-1.
- MacDonald, Ian (2005). Revolution in the Head: The Beatles' Records and the Sixties (2nd revised ed.). London, England: Pimlico (Rand). ISBN 1-844-13828-3.
- Miles, Barry (1998). Paul McCartney: Many Years From Now. London, England: Random House: Vintage. ISBN 0-7493-8658-4.
- Pollack, Alan W. (2000). "An Introduction to Notes on the Abbey Road 'Medley' (Medley)". rec.music.beatles. Archived from the original on 27 December 2021.
- Pollack, Alan W. (2000). "Notes on 'Her Majesty'". Soundscapes. Archived from the original on 17 September 2025.
- Riley, Tim (2002). Tell Me Why – The Beatles: Album by Album, Song by Song, the Sixties and After. Cambridge, Massachusetts: Da Capo Press. ISBN 978-0-306-81120-3.
- Schaffner, Nicholas (1978). The Beatles Forever. New York City, New York: McGraw-Hill. ISBN 0-07-055087-5.
- Turner, Steve (2005). A Hard Day's Write: The Stories Behind Every Beatles Song. New York City, New York: Harper Paperbacks. ISBN 0-06-084409-4.
- Winn, John C. (2009). That Magic Feeling: The Beatles' Recorded Legacy, Volume Two, 1966–1970. New York City, New York: Three Rivers Press. ISBN 978-0-307-45239-9.
- Womack, Kenneth (2014). The Beatles Encyclopedia: Everything Fab Four. ABC-CLIO: Greenwood. ISBN 978-0-313-39171-2.
- Womack, Kenneth (2019). Solid State: The Story of Abbey Road and the End of the Beatles. Ithaca, New York: Cornell University Press. ISBN 9781501746857.

=== News articles and websites ===
- Beaumont, Mark (2 November 2023). "The Beatles: every song ranked in order of greatness". NME. Archived from the original on 5 October 2025.
- Editorial staff (7 May 2020). "Beatles: a música 'Her Majesty' era um ataque à Rainha Elizabeth II?" [Beatles: Was the song 'Her Majesty' an attack on Queen Elizabeth II]. Rolling Stone Brasil (in Brazilian Portuguese). Archived from the original on 29 October 2025.
- Editorial staff (9 September 2022). "Pearl Jam faz homenagem à rainha Elizabeth II com cover de 'Her Majesty' dos Beatles" [Pearl Jam pays tribute to Queen Elizabeth II with a cover of The Beatles' 'Her Majesty']. Rolling Stone Brasil (in Brazilian Portuguese). Archived from the original on 29 October 2025.
- Gallucci, Michael (2 November 2023). "All 229 Beatles Songs Ranked Worst to Best". Ultimate Classic Rock. Archived from the original on 25 September 2025.
- Kane, Yukari Iwatani (21 October 2009). "Finding Closure in The Beatles: Rock Band". Wall Street Journal. Archived from the original on 28 October 2025.
- Lynch, Joe (26 September 2019). "The Beatles' Abbey Road Turns 50: Classic Track-by-Track Review". Billboard. Archived from the original on 18 January 2025.
- McGuinness, Paul (26 September 2025). "'Abbey Road' Cover Versions: The Beatles' Classic Album Reimagined". uDiscoverMusic. Archived from the original on 2 October 2025.
- Miller, Matt (26 September 2019). "The Best Beatles Song Is a 23-Second Track That Almost Didn't Exist". Esquire. Archived from the original on 21 July 2025.
- Rogers, Jude (25 January 2015). "Manna for fans: the history of the hidden track in music". The Guardian. Archived from the original on 24 February 2025.
- Smith, Alan (20 September 1969). "Abbey Road Album Track-by-Track". NME (1, 184): 10. Archived from the original on 22 June 2021.
- Steffens, Charlie (20 April 2013). "The Fab Four Horseman: An Exclusive Interview with Jaymz Lennfield of Beatallica". KNAC. Archived from the original on 1 August 2014.
- Unterberger, Richie. "Her Majesty Review by Richie Unterberger". AllMusic. Archived from the original on 7 October 2025.
- Weiner, Todd; Wolfowitz, Colin; Thomas, Fredrick; Millikan, Jay; Hutlock, Todd; Southall, Nick; Desouza, Julio; Plagenhoef, Scott; Panzner, Joe; Burns, Todd (7 April 2003). "Stylus' Non-definitive Guide to the Hidden Track". Stylus Magazine. Archived from the original on 19 July 2014.
- Willman, Chris (26 September 2019). "Album Review: The Beatles' 'Abbey Road: Anniversary Edition'". Variety. Archived from the original on 31 January 2026.
- Wyman, Bill (3 November 2023). "All 214 Beatles Songs, Ranked From Worst to Best". Vulture. Archived from the original on 14 September 2025.
