= I'm So Tired =

- Cover of the song's sheet music

Song by the Beatles

from the album The Beatles
- Released: 22 November 1968
- Recorded: 8 October 1968
- Studio: EMI, London
- Genre: Blues rock
- Length: 2:03
- Label: Apple
- Songwriter: Lennon–McCartney
- Producer: George Martin

Audio sample
- "I'm So Tired": file; help

"I'm So Tired" is a song by the English rock band the Beatles from their 1968 double album The Beatles (also known as "the White Album"). It was written and sung by John Lennon, though credited to Lennon–McCartney. Lennon wrote the song during the Beatles' stay in India about insomnia he was having due to constant meditation and because he missed Yoko Ono. The song was recorded in the same session as another White Album song, "The Continuing Story of Bungalow Bill".

== Composition ==
Lennon wrote the song at a Transcendental Meditation camp when he could not sleep; the Beatles had gone on a retreat to study with the Maharishi Mahesh Yogi in Rishikesh, India. After three weeks of constant meditation and lectures, Lennon missed Ono, with whom he had yet to start a relationship, and was plagued by insomnia, which inspired the song. One of dozens of songs the Beatles wrote in India, "I'm So Tired" detailed Lennon's fragile state of mind. It was also an open letter to Ono, whose postcards to Lennon in India were a lifeline. "I got so excited about her letters," he said. "I started thinking of her as a woman, and not just an intellectual woman." Lennon later said of it: "One of my favourite tracks. I just like the sound of it, and I sing it well".

The theme of insomnia complements Lennon's earlier song "I'm Only Sleeping" on the Revolver album.

During the second verse, Lennon calls Sir Walter Raleigh "a stupid get" for introducing tobacco to England.

The song is in the key of A major.

== Recording ==
An early demo of the song was recorded at George Harrison's Esher home, in May 1968. It was basically identical to the released version, in terms of verse, but it does include a spoken section reminiscent of a similar section in "Happiness Is a Warm Gun", which goes as follows:

When I hold you, in your arms,
When you show me, each one of your charms,
I wonder should I get up, and go to the funny farm.
No, no, no!

This section was probably improvised at the time, as it was never used again.The song was recorded on 8 October 1968 and was completed including all overdubs in this one session. The Beatles also started and completed "The Continuing Story of Bungalow Bill" during the same recording session. The chorus of the monaural mix of the song features louder backing vocals from Paul McCartney than the stereo mix.

The Beatles later performed the song, with McCartney singing lead vocal, in a jam session in Twickenham Film Studios in 1969.

== "Paul is dead" conspiracy theory ==
At the very end of the song, what seems to be nonsensical mumbling can be heard in the background. The mumbling, if played backwards can be imagined as something along the lines of "Paul is a dead man. Miss him. Miss him. Miss him." This only adds to the many supposed references to the "Paul is dead" conspiracy theory scattered throughout the White album. Mark Lewisohn has said that the mumbling is actually Lennon muttering, "Monsieur, monsieur, how about another one?"

== Legacy ==
Coinciding with the 50th anniversary of its release, Jacob Stolworthy of The Independent listed "I'm So Tired" at number 18 in his ranking of the White Album's 30 tracks. He wrote of the song: "The weary vocals from John Lennon remains desperately alluring to this day. A favourite of his, the song is best when viewed as a sequel to Revolver track, 'I'm Only Sleeping'."

== Personnel ==
- John Lennon – lead vocal, acoustic guitar, lead guitar, Hammond organ
- Paul McCartney – bass guitar, electric piano, backing vocal
- George Harrison – lead guitar
- Ringo Starr – drums

Personnel per Ian MacDonald
