= The Walk (Jimmy McCracklin song) =

Single by Jimmy McCracklin
- B-side: "I'm to Blame"
- Released: January 1958
- Genre: R&B
- Length: 2:49
- Label: Checker
- Songwriter(s): Jimmy McCracklin, Bob Garlic

Jimmy McCracklin singles chronology
| "Beer Tavern Girl" (1957) | "The Walk" (1958) | "Get Tough" (1958) |

Audio
- "The Walk" on YouTube

"The Walk" is a song written by Jimmy McCracklin and Bob Garlic and performed by McCracklin. It reached #5 on the U.S. R&B chart and #7 on the U.S. pop chart in 1958.

== Other charting versions ==
- The Inmates released a version which reached #36 on the UK Singles Chart and #107 on the U.S. pop chart in 1979.

== Other versions ==
- Bill Black's Combo released a version of the song on their 1962 album Movin'.
- The Hamsters released a version of the song on their 2002 album They Live by Night.
- The T. Rex song "Beltane Walk" from the group's 1970 debut album T. Rex has riffs similar to "The Walk".
- Freddie King's famous instrumental "Hide Away" quotes "The Walk" in one of its choruses.
- The Steve Miller Band recorded a version of "The Walk" on their album Let Your Hair Down, which interestingly quotes the main lick from "Hide Away" on the intro.
- The Beatles rehearsed the song during their Apple sessions in January 1969. A partial recording of their version of the song was released on the 1970 bootleg Kum Back and officially on the Let It Be special edition in 2021.
