= Let It Be: Special Edition =

Compilation album by the Beatles
- Released: 15 October 2021
- Recorded: February 1968 – April 1970
- Studios: Apple, EMI and Twickenham Film Studios, London
- Length: 164:27
- Label: Apple
- Producers: Phil Spector (original album); Glyn Johns (1969 Get Back mix); Giles Martin (remix)

The Beatles chronology
The Singles Collection (2019)	Let It Be: Special Edition (2021)	Get Back – The Rooftop Performance (2022)

Let It Be: Special Edition is an expanded reissue of the original 1970 album by the English rock band the Beatles. It was released by Apple Records on 15 October 2021 and includes a new stereo remix of the album, as well as a Dolby Atmos mix, by Sam Okell and Giles Martin, the son of Beatles producer George Martin.

== Background and content ==
This was not the first time Let It Be was released as a box set. The original album came out in a limited edition box set in the UK on 8 May 1970, which went out of print by that December and was replaced in circulation with a standard issue LP. Aside from the LP, the original box set included a 164-page paperback book.

Like the previous Beatles 50th anniversary box sets, Let It Be: Special Edition was originally going to be released the same month as the original album. However, due to the COVID-19 pandemic, its release was delayed until October 2021 while the release of the Get Back documentary series was delayed until November 2021. Additionally, the release dates of the super deluxe editions of John Lennon/Plastic Ono Band and All Things Must Pass were delayed until April 2021 and August 2021 respectively.

A trailer for Let It Be: Special Edition was released in August 2021, two months before its release. It was also revealed that a book containing essays, photos, session notes and a message from Paul McCartney on his thoughts on both the box set and the upcoming Get Back documentary will be included in the box set. Let It Be: Special Edition features a remix of the original Let It Be album by producer Giles Martin and engineer Sam Okell, along with session highlights, outtakes, an EP featuring four additional unreleased tracks and new mixes and a remaster of Glyn Johns' original 1969 Get Back mix. Let It Be: Special Edition is available in both CD and vinyl formats.

The box set included the first official release of Glyn Johns's 1969 Get Back mix, which was previously available in bootleg form, though the original 1969 mix is available only on the Japanese Super High Material (SHM) CD release, while the mix on all other releases combines elements from both Glyn Johns's 1969 mix and a later 1970 mix of his.

On 28 January 2022, the full audio recording of the rooftop concert was released to streaming services as The Beatles: Get Back – The Rooftop Performance.

== Reception ==
Let It Be: Special Edition received positive reviews. In an online review, music critic David Quantick stated the box set "does wonders for the record" and that it gives the listener "a bird’s-eye view of the sessions". Pitchfork gave it a 9.1 rating and said in their review that the box set shines a light on "the brilliant and tumultuous process" of the album, and called some of the outtakes "uncomfortable and fascinating".

On Metacritic, Let It Be: Special Edition holds an aggregate score of 91 out of 100, based on seven reviews, indicating "universal acclaim".

== Track listings ==
=== New stereo mix of original album ===
All tracks are written by Lennon–McCartney, except where noted.

Side one
No.	Title	Writer(s)	Lead vocal(s)	Length
1.	"Two of Us"		McCartney with Lennon	3:36
2.	"Dig a Pony"		Lennon	3:54
3.	"Across the Universe"		Lennon	3:48
4.	"I Me Mine"	George Harrison	Harrison	2:26
5.	"Dig It"	Lennon, McCartney, Harrison, Richard Starkey	Lennon	0:50
6.	"Let It Be"		McCartney	4:03
7.	"Maggie Mae"	Traditional; arranged by Lennon, McCartney, Harrison, Starkey	Lennon with McCartney	0:40

Side two
No.	Title	Writer(s)	Lead vocal(s)	Length
1.	"I've Got a Feeling"		McCartney and Lennon	3:37
2.	"One After 909"		Lennon with McCartney	2:54
3.	"The Long and Winding Road"		McCartney	3:38
4.	"For You Blue"	Harrison	Harrison	2:32
5.	"Get Back"		McCartney	3:09
Total length:				34:37

=== Get Back: Apple Sessions, Rehearsals, and Jams ===
Side one
No.	Title	Writer(s)	Length
1.	"Morning Camera" / "Two of Us" (Speech / Take 4)		3:42
2.	"Maggie Mae" / "Fancy My Chances with You"	Traditional / Lennon, McCartney	0:58
3.	"Can You Dig It?"		2:02
4.	"I Don't Know Why I'm Moaning" (Speech)		1:22
5.	"For You Blue" (Take 4)	Harrison	2:52
6.	"Let It Be" / "Please Please Me" / "Let It Be" (Take 10)		4:32
7.	"I've Got a Feeling" (Take 10)		3:37

Side two
No.	Title	Writer(s)	Length
1.	"Dig a Pony" (Take 14)		4:01
2.	"Get Back" (Take 19)		3:57
3.	"Like Making an Album?" (Speech)		0:42
4.	"One After 909" (Take 3)		3:27
5.	"Don't Let Me Down" (First Rooftop Performance)		3:28
6.	"The Long and Winding Road" (Take 19)		3:47
7.	"Wake Up Little Susie" / "I Me Mine" (Take 11)	Felice Bryant, Boudleaux Bryant / Harrison	2:15
Total length:			40:42

Side three
No.	Title	Writer(s)	Length
1.	"On the Day Shift Now" / "All Things Must Pass" (Speech / Rehearsals)	Harrison	4:22
2.	"Concentrate on the Sound"		1:07
3.	"Gimme Some Truth" (Rehearsals)	Lennon	1:19
4.	"I Me Mine" (Rehearsals)	Harrison	1:35
5.	"She Came in Through the Bathroom Window" (Rehearsals)		2:50
6.	"Polythene Pam" (Rehearsals)		1:19
7.	"Octopus's Garden" (Rehearsals)	Starkey	1:50

Side four
No.	Title	Writer(s)	Length
1.	"Oh! Darling" (Jam)		5:19
2.	"Get Back" (Take 8)		3:52
3.	"The Walk" (Jam)	Jimmy McCracklin, Bob Garlic	0:55
4.	"Without a Song" (Jam – Billy Preston with John and Ringo)	Vincent Youmans, Billy Rose, Edward Eliscu	2:00
5.	"Something" (Rehearsals)	Harrison	1:24
6.	"Let It Be" (Take 28)		4:42
Total length:			32:34

=== Get Back: 1969 Glyn Johns Mix ===
Side one
No.	Title	Writer(s)	Length
1.	"One After 909"		3:06
2.	"I'm Ready (Rocker)" / "Save the Last Dance for Me" (Medley)	Fats Domino, Al Lewis, Sylvester Bradford / Doc Pomus, Mort Shuman	1:56
3.	"Don't Let Me Down"		4:05
4.	"Dig a Pony"		4:13
5.	"I've Got a Feeling"		2:53
6.	"Get Back"		3:13

Side two
No.	Title	Writer(s)	Length
1.	"For You Blue" (1969 mix with 1970 lead vocal overdub)	Harrison	2:53
2.	"Teddy Boy"	McCartney	3:41
3.	"Two of Us"		3:29
4.	"Maggie Mae"	Traditional; arranged by Lennon, McCartney, Harrison, Starkey	0:38
5.	"Dig It"	Lennon, McCartney, Harrison, Starkey	4:09
6.	"Let It Be"		4:09
7.	"The Long And Winding Road"		3:39
8.	"Get Back" (Reprise)		0:40
Total length:			42:45

=== Let It Be: Bonus EP ===
Side one
No.	Title	Writer(s)	Length
1.	"Across The Universe" (Unreleased Glyn Johns 1970 Mix)		3:31
2.	"I Me Mine" (Unreleased Glyn Johns 1970 Mix)	Harrison	1:45

Side two
No.	Title	Length
1.	"Don't Let Me Down" (New Mix of Original Single Version)	4:08
2.	"Let It Be" (New Mix of Original Single Version)	3:52
Total length:		13:16

== Personnel ==
- Giles Martin – mixing supervisor
- Sam Okell – mixing co-engineer

== Charts ==
Chart performance for Let It Be: Special Edition
Chart (2021)	Peak position
Australian Albums (ARIA)	2
Belgian Albums (Ultratop Flanders)	6
Belgian Albums (Ultratop Wallonia)	2
Canadian Albums (Billboard)	8
Czech Albums (ČNS IFPI)	14
Finnish Albums (Suomen virallinen lista)	5
German Albums (Offizielle Top 100)	3
Hungarian Albums (MAHASZ)	34
Irish Albums (Official Charts)	3
New Zealand Albums (RMNZ)	5
Polish Albums (ZPAV)	22
Spanish Albums (Promusicae)	5
Swiss Albums (Schweizer Hitparade)	3
UK Albums (Official Charts)	2
US Billboard 200	5

== See also ==
- Outline of the Beatles
- The Beatles timeline
