= Mean Mr. Mustard =

1969 song by the Beatles

- Northern Songs sheet music cover

Song by the Beatles

from the album Abbey Road
- Released: 26 September 1969 (UK)
- Recorded: 24–29 July 1969
- Studio: EMI, London
- Genre: Rock
- Length: 1:06
- Label: Apple
- Songwriters: John Lennon, credited to Lennon–McCartney
- Producer: George Martin

Abbey Road medley chronology
| "Sun King" | "Mean Mr. Mustard" | "Polythene Pam" |

Official audio
- "Mean Mr. Mustard (Remastered 2009)" on YouTube

"Mean Mr. Mustard" is a song by English rock band the Beatles, released on their 1969 studio album Abbey Road. Written by John Lennon, it is the third track of the album's climactic medley.

The song was to be recorded for the Beatles' 1968 White Album but instead made Abbey Road, a contribution of Lennon's to the medley (also dubbed the Long One) that he viewed with frigidness. In fact, he later called the song, along with another of his medley pieces, "bits of crap I wrote in India". The band recorded "Mustard" in late July 1969 as a continuous piece with "Sun King", which precedes it in the Long One.

== Background ==
=== The song ===
John Lennon wrote "Mean Mr. Mustard" in Rishikesh, (Note: While Lennon wrote "Mean Mr. Mustard", it is credited to Lennon–McCartney.) a pilgrimage town for Hindus. The Beatles had travelled there in February 1968 to stay at the Maharashi Mahesh Yogi's monastery and practise Transcendental Meditation. The weeks which were spent in Rishikesh yielded many of the tracks that formed the band's ninth studio album, The Beatles (popularly dubbed the White Album).

Lennon said that it was inspired by a newspaper story about a miser who concealed his cash wherever he could in order to prevent people from forcing him to spend it. A newspaper article from the 7 June 1967 Daily Record with the headline "A Mean Husband Shaved in the Dark" features a man called John Mustard, who lived in Enfield, London. In a 1980 Playboy interview, Lennon said: "I’d read somewhere in the paper about this mean guy who was hiding £5 notes, not up his nose but somewhere else, and so I wrote about him." He adds: "No, it had nothing to do with cocaine." On reflection, Lennon called the song and its companion "Polythene Pam" "only finished bits of crap I wrote in India", and he introduced it in the Playboy interview as "a piece of garbage".

The Daily Record article that is said to have inspired the song; a better quality version can be accessed here.

=== The Abbey Road medley ===
I think Paul has conceptions of albums, or attempts it, like he conceived the medley thing. I'm not interested in conceptions of albums. All I'm interested in is the sound. I like it to be whatever happens. I’m not interested in making the album into a show. For me, I'd just put 14 rock songs on.

— Lennon

When working on Abbey Road, the Beatles did not know that their time as a band was fast moving towards divorce. (Note: Traditional works of Beatles scholarship state otherwise, but their account has since fallen out of favour. For example, Ian MacDonald writes in Revolution in the Head (2005) that the group, conscious of their fate, gave their assent for the medley mostly to close their career together with a majestic ending, a celebration.) (Note: Still, some people close to the Beatles had their suspicions. The sound engineeer Alan Parsons, who worked on Abbey Road, wrote in the foreword to Solid State (2019): "I also knew that, realistically speaking, Abbey Road would be the last time the Beatles would be the Beatles." George Martin too sensed an unmistakable end to their partnership, and Ethan Russell gathered from the photoshoots for the album cover that "they were not a happy group". While he did not know for sure, George Harrison said that "it felt as if we were reaching the end of the line".) Lennon originally wanted a rock and roll album, and McCartney, a pop symphony/opera, so the album was split two ways: the first side contained individual songs, and most the second was a sixteen-minute medley. The idea for the medley was McCartney's, and the group's producer George Martin claimed his share of credit in its creation in wanting "to get John and Paul to think more seriously about their music". He had long been advising the group to "think symphonically", to use motifs and complex structures and forms. Thus, the medley's songs, short "half" songs, are connected in some way by thematic or tonal coherence and link together through segues and fades.

The Beatles biographer Hunter Davies coldly describes the medley as a long string of "short pieces that ... were unfinished, hardly worked on, half realised scraps that got melded together, running into each other, with the odd reprise, to fill up the end of the album", although he follows the narrative that the Beatles knew Abbey Road would be their last album. Lennon was less eager about the Long One, both because it was McCartney's idea and because he preferred unvarnished rock and roll free from intricate album structures and other grand touches. Such was his preferrence that when Neil Aspinall suggested Sgt. Pepper's Lonely Hearts Club Band include a reprise of the title song, Lennon told him: "No one likes a smart-arse, Neil." He said that his three contributions to the medley, "Sun King", "Mustard", and "Polythene Pam", were "juggled ... about until it made vague sense"; and according to the author Chris Ingham, he would have considered them "garbage". Some critics hold that the three Lennon numbers are the medley's weakest patch. (Note: Ingham adds McCartney's "She Came In Through the Bathroom Window", following "Pam", to this sequence of "diverting filler".) In spite of this, Ingham, one of these critics, thinks they are "hugely entertaining musically" with their peculiar characters, and Mark Hertsgaard, another, praises "Pam"'s "wicked humor". Rolling Stone agrees: "He contributed some of its most eccentric parts, like the sneering 'Mean Mr. Mustard' and the quick, funky put-down 'Polythene Pam.'"

The author Nicholas Schaffner writes: "Like all their best albums, Abbey Road is inhabited by a large cast of whimsical characters—such as Maxwell, who cheerfully bumps off all and sundry with a magic hammer; Mean Mr. Mustard with the 10-shilling note up his nose, who gets his kicks out of screaming obscenities at Her Majesty; and his transvestite sister Pam, resplendent in a polythene bag." As far back as in May 1968 demo, Mustard's sister was named Shirley, but Lennon later changed it to Pam "to make it sound like it had something to do with it" and hence better segue into "Polythene Pam". Lennon wanted to record his medley songs at one go, without interruption; as Womack writes, "In so doing, they would not only serve the purposes of the musical suite but also share in the unfolding character studies that the medley was beginning to accrue."

== Recording and place on Abbey Road ==
Take 20 of "Mean Mr. Mustard"
- Mean Mr. Mustard (Take 20) on YouTube

"Mustard" was first intended to be recorded for the White Album.

For a time, the medley was intended to run with "Her Majesty" flanked by "Mustard" and "Pam". However, while the Abbey Road tracks were being remixed, on 30 July, McCartney deemed "Her Majesty" unfit for the Long One and told the sound engineer John Kurlander to scrap it. (Note: According to Kenneth Womack, the "acoustic simplicity" of "Her Majesty" did not suit the medley's vigour, especially when placed amid "Mustard" and "Pam".) Since Kurlander was under orders not to throw out any Beatles recording, he inserted it at the end of Abbey Road after "The End"; his edit was only rough. Due to this change in sequencing, "Pam" opens with "Her Majesty"'s final chord, and the end of "Mustard" is covered by the opening chords of "Pam", though the transition between them remains rather plane since "Pam" opens with a D major chord common to "Mustard". These errors were never fixed; when Kurlander tried doing so on 30 July, McCartney told him: "Never mind, it's only a rough mix, it doesn't matter."

== Composition ==
=== Style and music ===
"Mustard" is in the key of E major and in 4/4 time throughout.

"Mustard" is harmonically similar to "Pam", written in the same key and using the same chords, barring G major in the latter. However, the progressions differ. In "Mustard", the melody starts with the tonic and leads to the subdominant before returning to the tonic, while in "Pam", the melody lines culminate in the tonic. Furthermore, the dominant's role in "Mustard" is its usual one, to form a complete cadence, but "Pam" relies on a flat seventh chord to form a cadence, as the dominant serves only a supporting role in the melody.

== Release and reception ==
Apple Records released "Mustard" on 26 September 1969 in the UK and five days later in the US, as part of Abbey Road. The Kinfauns demo was later issued on Anthology 3 and the 2018 expanded edition of the White Album. The 2019 deluxe reissue of Abbey Road featured take 20 of "Mustard". The complete version of "Mustard" (with its original clean ending) can be heard on The Beatles: Rock Band video game, as well as Abbey Road's 2019 Super Deluxe Edition.

The Age, reviewing Abbey Road a month after release, calls "Mustard" a "derisive ditty". In another contemporary review of the album, NME's Alan Smith describes it as "a mid-tempo beater with more in the words than in the music".

== Cover versions ==
Booker T. & the M.G.'s covered "Mean Mr. Mustard" and many other Abbey Road tracks on their 1970 album McLemore Avenue. Their album was a mostly instrumental reinvention of the Beatles' work, conceived by Booker T. Jones after he heard it for the first time: "... I thought it was incredibly courageous of The Beatles to drop their format and move out musically like they did. To push the limit like that and reinvent themselves when they had no need to do that. ... The music was just incredible so I felt I needed to pay tribute to it." When Mojo magazine released an album of Abbey Road covers, Abbey Road Now!, to commemorate the album's fortieth anniversary, "Mustard" featured in a medley with "Polythene Pam" by the indie rock band Cornershop. The music journalist Paul McGuinness chose this recording as the best cover of both "Mustard" and "Pam".

== Personnel ==
According to the Abbey Road 50th anniversary booklet:

- John Lennon – lead and harmony vocals, rhythm guitar, piano
- Paul McCartney – harmony vocals, fuzz bass
- George Harrison – lead guitar
- Ringo Starr – drums, tambourine, maracas

== Bibliography ==
=== Books and academic sources ===
- The Beatles (2000). The Beatles Anthology. San Francisco, California: Chronicle Books. ISBN 0-811-82684-8.
- Courrier, Kevin (2009). Artificial Paradise: The Dark Side of the Beatles' Utopian Dream. Westport, Connecticut: Praeger Publishers. ISBN 978-0-313-34586-9.
- Davies, Hunter (2016). The Beatles Book. London, England: Ebury Publishing. ISBN 978-0-09-195863-3.
- Emerick, Geoff; Massey, Howard (2006). Here, There and Everywhere: My Life Recording the Music of the Beatles. New York City, New York: Gotham Books. ISBN 978-1-592-40269-4.
- Everett, Walter (1999). The Beatles As Musicians: Revolver Through the Anthology. New York City, New York: Oxford University Press. ISBN 0-19-512941-5.
- Everett, Walter (2019). "Children of Nature: Origins of the Beatles' Tabula Rasa". In Osteen, Mark (ed.). The Beatles through a Glass Onion: Reconsidering the White Album. Ann Arbor, Michigan: The University of Michigan Press. pp. 54–71. ISBN 978-0-472-07408-2..
- Guesdon, Jean-Michel; Margotin, Philippe (2013). All the Songs: The Story Behind Every Beatles Release. New York City, New York: Black Dog & Leventhal Publishers. ISBN 978-1-57912-952-1.
- Hamelman, Steve (2009). "On Their Way Home: The Beatles in 1969 and 1970". In Womack, Kenneth (ed.). The Cambridge Companion to the Beatles. New York City, New York: Cambridge University Press. pp. 125–41. ISBN 978-0-521-68976-2.
- Harry, Bill (2000) [1992]. The Beatles Encyclopedia (2nd ed.). London, England: Virgin Books. ISBN 0-7535-0481-2.
- Harry, Bill (1997). The Encyclopedia of Beatles People. London, England: Blandford. ISBN 0-7137-2606-7.
- Harry, Bill (2000). The John Lennon Encyclopedia. London, England: Virgin. ISBN 0-7535-0404-9.
- Hertsgaard, Mark (1996). A Day in the Life: The Music and Artistry of the Beatles. London, England: Pan Books. ISBN 0-330-33891-9.
- Howlett, Kevin (2019). Abbey Road (50th Anniversary Super Deluxe Version) (book). Apple Records.
- Ingham, Chris (2006). The Rough Guide to the Beatles (2nd ed.). London, England, & New York City, New York: Rough Guides. ISBN 978-1-84353-720-5.
- Inglis, Ian (2019). "I Call Your Name: Introducing the Cast of the White Album". In Osteen, Mark (ed.). The Beatles through a Glass Onion: Reconsidering the White Album. Ann Arbor, Michigan: The University of Michigan Press. pp. 127–144. ISBN 978-0-472-07408-2..
- Lewisohn, Mark (1988). The Beatles Recording Sessions. New York City, New York: Harmony Books. ISBN 0-517-57066-1.
- Lewisohn, Mark (2005) [1988]. The Complete Beatles Recording Sessions: The Official Story of the Abbey Road Years 1962–1970. London, England: Bounty Books. ISBN 978-0-7537-2545-0.
- Lewisohn, Mark (1992). The Complete Beatles Chronicle. New York City, New York: Harmony Books. ISBN 0-517-58100-0.
- MacDonald, Ian (2005) [1994]. Revolution in the Head: The Beatles' Records and the Sixties (2nd revised ed.). London, England: Pimlico (Rand). ISBN 1-844-13828-3.
- Martinelli, Dario; Bucciarelli, Paolo (2023). The Beatles and the Beatlesque: A Crossdisciplinary Analysis of Sound, Production and Stylistic Impact. Cham, Switzerland: Springer. ISBN 978-3-031-33803-8.
- Miles, Barry (2002). The Beatles: A Diary: An Intimate Day by Day History. London, England; New York City, New York; & Sydney, New South Wales: Omnibus Press. ISBN 0-7119-9196-0.
- Miles, Barry (1997). Paul McCartney: Many Years from Now. New York City, New York: Henry Holt and Company. ISBN 0-8050-5248-8.
- Pollack, Alan W. (2000). "An Introduction to Notes on the Abbey Road 'Medley' (Medley)". rec.music.beatles. Archived from the original on 27 December 2021.
- Pollack, Alan W. (1999). "Notes on 'Mean Mr Mustard' (MMM)". rec.music.beatles. Archived from the original on 5 August 2026.
- Pollack, Alan W. (1999). "Notes on 'Polythene Pam' (PP)". rec.music.beatles. Archived from the original on 24 July 2026.
- Riley, Tim (2002). Tell Me Why – The Beatles: Album by Album, Song by Song, the Sixties and After. Cambridge, Massachusetts: Da Capo Press. ISBN 978-0-306-81120-3.
- Schaffner, Nicholas (1978). The Beatles Forever. New York City, New York: McGraw-Hill. ISBN 0-07-055087-5.
- Sheff, David (2020). Golson, G. Barry (ed.). All We Are Saying: The Last Major Interview with John Lennon and Yoko Ono (40th anniversary ed.). New York City, New York: St. Martin's Griffin. ISBN 978-1-5290-4841-4.
- Turner, Steve (2005). A Hard Day's Write: The Stories Behind Every Beatles Song. New York City, New York: Harper Paperbacks. ISBN 0-06-084409-4.
- Winn, John C. (2009). That Magic Feeling: The Beatles' Recorded Legacy, Volume Two, 1966–1970. New York City, New York: Three Rivers Press. ISBN 978-0-307-45239-9.
- Womack, Kenneth (2014). The Beatles Encyclopedia: Everything Fab Four: A–J. Vol. 1. Santa Barbara, California: Greenwood. ISBN 978-0-313-39171-2.
- Womack, Kenneth (2014). The Beatles Encyclopedia: Everything Fab Four: K–Z. Vol. 2. Santa Barbara, California: Greenwood. ISBN 978-0-313-39171-2.
- Womack, Kenneth (2007). Long and Winding Roads: The Evolving Artistry of the Beatles. New York City, New York, & London, England: Continuum. ISBN 978-0-8264-1746-6.
- Womack, Kenneth (2019). Solid State: The Story of Abbey Road and the End of the Beatles. Ithaca, New York: Cornell University Press. ISBN 9781501746857.

=== Magazines and websites ===
- "Neat Pop Feat". The Age. 23 October 1969. p. 37 – via Newspapers.com.
- Beaumont, Mark (2 November 2023). "The Beatles: Every Song Ranked In Order Of Greatness". NME. Archived from the original on 5 October 2025.
- "The Beatles Announce 'Abbey Road' 50th Anniversary Release". Classics Du Jour. 8 August 2019. Archived from the original on 5 August 2026.
- Gallucci, Michael (2 November 2023). "All 229 Beatles Songs Ranked Worst to Best". Ultimate Classic Rock. Archived from the original on 25 September 2025.
- Gerard, Chris (19 February 2016). "The Glorious, Quixotic Mess That Is the Beatles' 'White Album'". PopMatters. Archived from the original on 8 September 2025.
- Havers, Richard (31 March 2026). "'McLemore Avenue': Booker T. And The MGs Take The Beatles To Stax". uDiscoverMusic. Archived from the original on 2 April 2026.
- Lynch, Joe (26 September 2019). "The Beatles' Abbey Road Turns 50: Classic Track-by-Track Review". Billboard. Archived from the original on 18 January 2025.
- Maginnis, Tom. "Mean Mr. Mustard by Tom Maginnis". AllMusic. Archived from the original on 8 May 2020.
- Mann, William (5 December 1969). "Those Inventive Beatles". The Times. p. 7. Archived from the original on 29 July 2026 – via The Beatles Bible.
- McGuinness, Paul (26 September 2025). "'Abbey Road' Cover Versions: The Beatles' Classic Album Reimagined". uDiscoverMusic. Archived from the original on 8 March 2026.
- Mendelsohn, John (15 November 1969). "Abbey Road". Rolling Stone. Archived from the original on 5 February 2022.
- Paytress, Mark (2003). "A Passage to India". Mojo. Mojo Special Limited Edition: 1000 Days of Revolution (The Beatles' Final Years – Jan 1, 1968 to Sept 27, 1970). Emap. pp. 10–17.
- Puterbaugh, Parke (12 December 1996). "The Beatles Anthology: 3". Rolling Stone. Archived from the original on 26 May 2022.
- "100 Greatest Beatles Songs [under 23: 'Abbey Road Medley']". Rolling Stone. 20 April 2020. Archived from the original on 30 May 2026.
- Runtagh, Jordan (29 May 2018). "The Beatles' Revelatory White Album Demos: A Complete Guide". Rolling Stone. Archived from the original on 9 May 2024.
- Smith, Alan (20 September 1969). "Abbey Road Album Track-by-Track". NME. No. 1, 184. p. 10. Archived from the original on 22 June 2021.
- "'I'm Better than Ringo; Paul McCartney Told Me!': Bev Bevan's First Meeting with the Beatles". Something Else!. 7 May 2013. Archived from the original on 25 July 2026.
- Stephens, Christopher John (15 November 2018). "The Beatles' 'White Album' Sounds Glorious on the 50th Anniversary Edition". PopMatters. Archived from the original on 8 March 2026.
- Williams, Richard (11 September 2019). "'This Tape Rewrites Everything We Knew about the Beatles'". The Guardian. Archived from the original on 9 June 2026.
- Willman, Chris (26 September 2019). "Album Review: The Beatles' 'Abbey Road: Anniversary Edition'". Variety. Archived from the original on 31 January 2026.
- Wyman, Bill (3 November 2023). "All 214 Beatles Songs, Ranked From Worst to Best". Vulture. Archived from the original on 14 September 2025.
