= Rocky Raccoon =

- Cover of the Maclen Music sheet music (depicting George Harrison and Ringo Starr)

Song by the Beatles

from the album The Beatles
- Released: 22 November 1968
- Recorded: 15 August 1968
- Studio: EMI, London
- Genre: Country; ragtime
- Length: 3:33
- Label: Apple
- Songwriter: Lennon–McCartney
- Producer: George Martin

Official audio
- "Rocky Raccoon" on YouTube

"Rocky Raccoon" is a song by the English rock band the Beatles from their 1968 double album The Beatles (also known as the White Album). It was primarily written by Paul McCartney, although credited to the Lennon–McCartney partnership, and sung by McCartney. McCartney began writing the song in Rishikesh, India, where the Beatles were studying Transcendental Meditation in the early months of 1968. John Lennon and Scottish singer-songwriter Donovan, who joined the Beatles on their retreat, also made contributions to the song. A cover version by Richie Havens reached number 76 in Canada in 1969.

== Composition ==
The song, a country-style ballad, is titled from the character's name, which was originally "Rocky Sassoon", but McCartney changed it to "Rocky Raccoon" because he thought "it sounded more like a cowboy". Former 13th Floor Elevators drummer Danny Thomas claims the name "Rocky" was inspired by Roky Erickson, the American rock band's then-vocalist and guitarist. According to Beatles historian Kenneth Womack, McCartney drew his inspiration for the song from Robert W. Service's poem "The Shooting of Dan McGrew". Canadian photographer and filmmaker Paul Saltzman, author of The Beatles in Rishikesh and The Beatles in India, has expressed the belief that Paul McCartney based the lyrics for "Rocky Raccoon" on Saltzman's description to him in Rishikesh of his girlfriend having recently left him for another man. The Old West-style honky-tonk piano was played by producer George Martin. "Rocky Raccoon" is also the last Beatles song to feature John Lennon's harmonica playing.

The lyrics describe a conflict over a love triangle in the Black Hills. Rocky Raccoon's girlfriend "Lil" McGill (known to the public as Nancy) leaves him for a man named Dan. Dan punches Rocky in the eye, and in response, Rocky declares that "[he's] gonna get that boy". An unknown amount of time later, Rocky checks into a room at the town's saloon, and finds a Gideon Bible. Dan and Nancy are having a hoedown in the next room, so Rocky bursts in and challenges Dan to a duel. Dan outdraws and shoots him. A drunken doctor attends to his bullet wound, and Rocky insists that the wound is minor. Rocky returns to his room. He then sees the Bible, and interprets it as a sign that he will be revived, physically and spiritually.

== Legacy ==
In Mojo magazine in October 2008, McCartney acknowledged that the style of the song is a pastiche, saying: "I was basically spoofing the folksinger." Lennon attributed the song to McCartney, saying: "Couldn't you guess? Would I have gone to all that trouble about Gideon's Bible and all that stuff?"

Coinciding with the 50th anniversary of its release, Jacob Stolworthy of The Independent listed "Rocky Raccoon" at number 22 in his ranking of the White Album's 30 tracks. He called the song "proof of McCartney's songwriting versatility" and continued that the song is "bolstered by a vibrant honky-tonk piano from the group's long-time record producer George Martin".

The song also became the inspiration for the Marvel Comics character Rocket Raccoon who would later become a fan favourite character.

== Personnel ==
According to Ian MacDonald, except where noted:

- Paul McCartney – lead vocals, acoustic guitar
- John Lennon – backing vocals, harmonium, six-string bass, harmonica
- George Harrison – backing vocals, bass
- Ringo Starr – drums
- George Martin – honky-tonk piano
