= The Beatles (TV series) =

Animated television series

- (left to right) John, Ringo, George, and Paul.
- Genre: Comedy; Musical
- Created by: Al Brodax
- Written by: Al Brodax; Bruce Howard; Heywood Kling; Dennis Marks; Jack Mendelsohn
- Directed by: Jack Stokes; Graham Sharpe; Ron Campbell; Jim Hiltz; Ray Leach; John Dunn; Bob Godfrey; Tony Gearty; Tom McDonald; Frank Andrina; Barry Helmer; Mike Jones
- Voices of: Paul Frees; Lance Percival; Julie Bennett; Carol Corbett
- Theme music composer: Lennon–McCartney
- Opening theme: "Can't Buy Me Love" (season 1, full programme); "Help!" (season 2, full programme); "And Your Bird Can Sing" (season 3, full programme); "The Beatles Opening Theme" (animated segments, all seasons)
- Ending theme: "The Beatles End Theme" (1964)
- Composer: The Beatles (songs)
- Countries of origin: United States; United Kingdom
- Original language: English
- No. of seasons: 3
- No. of episodes: 39

Production
- Executive producer: Al Brodax
- Producers: Al Brodax; Mary Ellen Stewart; George Dunning; Leon Becker; Jack Gettles
- Running time: 18 min (UK Version); 30 Min (Full Version)
- Production companies: King Features Syndicate; Artransa/Graphik; Canawest Studios; TVC London

Original release
- Network: ABC (United States); Australian Broadcasting Corporation (Australia); ITV (United Kingdom)
- Release: 25 September 1965 – 21 October 1967

Related
- Yellow Submarine (1968)

The Beatles, also referred to as The Beatles Cartoon, is an animated television series featuring representations of the English rock band of the same name. The series debuted on 25 September 1965, in the United States on ABC with new episodes airing until 21 October 1967. The series continued with reruns until September 7, 1969. A total of thirty-nine episodes were produced. The series was shown on Saturdays at 10:30 AM EST until the third season in 1967, when it was moved to 12:00 PM EST. Reruns aired from 1968 to 1969 at 9:30 AM EST on Sundays. Each episode is named after a Beatles song, with a plot based on its lyrics and played in the episode. The series was rerun on MTV in 1986 and 1987 and on The Disney Channel beginning in 1989 on Fridays at 5 PM.

The series was the first weekly television series to feature animated versions of real, living people.

== Cast ==
- Paul Frees as John Lennon, George Harrison, Brian Epstein, Additional voices
- Lance Percival as Paul McCartney, Ringo Starr, Ed Sullivan,

== List of episodes ==
=== Season 1 (1965–66) ===
No. overall	No. in season	Title	Directed by
1	1	"A Hard Day's Night"	Graham C. Sharpe
1	1	"I Want to Hold Your Hand"	Jack Stokes
While in Transylvania, The Beatles try rehearsing in a haunted castle with "monstrous" visitors, including a vampire, a ghost, a werewolf, and a witch, with a parody of Boris Karloff. To hide from their fans, the Beatles run inside a diving bell, which drops them into the ocean with a lovesick octopus. Sing Alongs: Not a Second Time / Devil In Her Heart
2	2	"Do You Want to Know a Secret"	John Dunn
2	2	"If I Fell"	Ray Leach
The Beatles go to Dublin, Ireland for the weekend where they meet a female leprechaun named Wilhelmina Morris. John is kidnapped by Dr. Dora Florahyde and Igor, who want John's brain for their monster. Sing Alongs: A Hard Day's Night / I Want To Hold Your Hand
3	3	"Please Mister Postman"	Jack Stokes
3	3	"Devil In Her Heart"	Graham C. Sharpe
Ringo loses 15 rings he bought with all of the Beatles' earnings and they are expecting a telegram from manager Brian Epstein for more money. While in Transylvania, Ringo wanders into the woods, where he meets a witch who wants him for a husband. Sing Alongs: If I Fell / Do You Want to Know a Secret
4	4	"Not A Second Time"	Jack Stokes
4	4	"Slow Down"	Graham C. Sharpe
Trying to get away from their fans, The Beatles abandon their flight and land in Africa, but three girls keep tracking them down. The Beatles are on the way to the town Ringo Ravine (named after Ringo) until they encounter a donkey named "Gold Nose" that smells gold. Sing Alongs: Baby's In Black / Misery
5	5	"Baby's In Black"	Graham C. Sharpe
5	5	"Misery"	John Dunn
Paul gets kidnapped by Professor Psycho, who wants Paul to marry his creation Vampiress, half girl and half bat. The Beatles go to a wax museum to see themselves, but a vampire who's hiding there from the police chases them. Sing Alongs: I'll Get You / Chains
6	6	"You've Really Got A Hold On Me"	Jack Stokes
6	6	"Chains"	Jack Stokes
In Africa, Ringo asks a medicine maker named Jack to help fix the Beatles' flat tire. Jack then turns a worm into a snake and it lusts for Ringo. On a cruise ship, Ringo gets accidentally knocked out and dreams that he's Captain Bligh from the movie Mutiny on the Bounty (1962). Sing Alongs: Slow Down / Honey Don't
7	7	"I'll Get You"	Snav Sniekus
7	7	"Honey Don't"	Graham C. Sharpe
In Africa after escaping from their fans, the Beatles run into hunter Alan Watermain (a parody of the H. Rider Haggard character Allan Quatermain) and go out big-game hunting. Ringo is mistaken as a bull rider, and the cowboys send him to ride on a super-tough bull named Honey. Sing Alongs: You've Really Got A Hold On Me / Any Time At All
8	8	"Any Time At All"	Jack Stokes
8	8	"Twist and Shout"	Tony Gearty
The Beatles imagine themselves as the Three Musketeers (Plus One) while they are on a tour at a museum in France and try to rescue a "lady in distress". The Beatles attend an art show where a girl tries to be like other artists, so they inspire her with music. Sing Alongs: I'll Be Back / Little Child
9	9	"Little Child"	Graham C. Sharpe
9	9	"I'll Be Back"	Ray Leach
A Native American girl on a Texas Indian reservation wants to prove that girls are as good at trapping as boys are by trapping the Beatles. The mayor of a Texas town gives Ringo a golden guitar as a gift, only for it to be stolen by three men, prompting the Fab Four to hunt for the thieves and get the guitar back. (The song "Ticket to Ride" is heard at the beginning of this episode.) Sing Alongs: Long Tall Sally / Twist And Shout
10	10	"Long Tall Sally"	Tom McDonald
10	10	"I'll Cry Instead"	Graham C. Sharpe and Ron Campbell
While the Beatles are staying at a castle for the night during a fog, John and Ringo try on a couple of cursed armor suits and start to fight each other. After signing too many autographs in Japan, George's hand gets swollen and suffers "autographitis", so his bandmates take him to a hand doctor but end up in a karate class by mistake. Sing Alongs: I'll Follow The Sun / When I Get Home
11	11	"I'll Follow the Sun"	John Dunn
11	11	"When I Get Home"	Jack Stokes
The Beatles' car breaks down and they are captured by a highwayman who happens to be a car repairman. The Beatles explore Notre Dame in Paris where they later meet its famous hunchback Quasimodo. Sing Alongs: I'll Cry Instead / Everybody's Trying To Be My Baby
12	12	"Everybody's Trying To Be My Baby"	Graham C. Sharpe and Ron Campbell
12	12	"I Should Have Known Better"	Jack Stokes
After spending the night at a temple in Japan during a rainstorm, the Beatles are mistaken for the ancestors of four girls. The Beatles are in Rome trying to find a theater to rehearse, and their last resort is the Colosseum. Sing Alongs: I'm a Loser / I Wanna Be Your Man
13	13	"I'm a Loser"	Jack Stokes
13	13	"I Wanna Be Your Man"	Snav Sniekus
In Hollywood, Ringo gets hired as a stuntman by Incredible Pictures Inc. and keeps getting pulverized in many scenes. In Rome, the Beatles buy a statue of the Goddess of Music made from stolen gold coins melted down and sculpted. Sing Alongs: No Reply / I'm Happy Just To Dance With You
14	14	"Don't Bother Me"	Jack Stokes
14	14	"No Reply"	Ray Leach
The Beatles are in a rush to get to Barcelona from Rome, but they're being chased by two spies who are after their songbook "New Beatle Songs", marked "Top Secret" (the Beatles movie Help! and Oddjob from the James Bond movie Goldfinger are spoofed). In Japan, the Beatles are warned by a Charlie Chan-lookalike police detective about a master-of-disguise jewel thief named Anyface, and things become complicated when Anyface shows up disguised as Paul. Sing Alongs: It Won't Be Long / I Should Have Known Better
15	15	"I'm Happy Just To Dance With You"	Bob Godfrey
15	15	"Mister Moonlight"	Bob Godfrey
The Beatles are in a Roman street festival where Paul wins a dancing bear named Bonnie. The Beatles meet Professor Ludwig Von Brilliant, who is on a mission to view an eclipse. After being adrift at sea, they escape from an island on a submarine. Sing Alongs: Don't Bother Me / Can't Buy Me Love
16	16	"Can't Buy Me Love"	Graham C. Sharpe and Ron Campbell
16	16	"It Won't Be Long"	Graham C. Sharpe and Ron Campbell
John is given a friendship ring from a Polynesian tribal chief, which means he must marry the chief's New York-accented daughter who dislikes pineapples. While picnicking in Japan, John goes for a swim in a pond with shrinking potion in it and gets shrunk, making the other Beatles think John is a Beatle doll and chase after him. Sing Alongs: Anna (Go to Him) / Mr. Moonlight
17	17	"Anna"	Graham C. Sharpe and Ron Campbell
17	17	"I Don't Want To Spoil The Party"	Frank Andrina
In Japan when Paul gets lured into a ghost ship called "Ah-Nah", the other Beatles dash off to the rescue before they lose Paul for good. Rather than go with John to a museum, Paul, George and Ringo sneak away and go to Greenwich Village for some fun time at a Beatnik party. Sing Alongs: Matchbox / Thank You Girl
18	18	"Matchbox"	Graham C. Sharpe and Ron Campbell
18	18	"Thank You Girl"	Snav Sniekus
In Hawaii, rather than stay at hotels, John buys a trailer for the group to stay in. They later encounter a group of Hawaiians who are evacuating from a volcano. When they sneak away from their manager to get something to eat at a French restaurant, the Beatles somehow enroll in a cooking course. Sing Alongs: I Don't Want To Spoil The Party / Help!
19	19	"With Love From Me To You"	Graham C. Sharpe and Ron Campbell
19	19	"Boys (Note: Songs in episodes with no Sing Along counterpart.)"	Jack Stokes
In Hawaii, a surfer named Surf Wolf challenges George to a surfing duel. The Beatles participate in a Mr. Hollywood Contest in California. Sing Alongs: Please Mr. Postman / I Saw Her Standing There
20	20	"Dizzy Miss Lizzy"	Graham C. Sharpe and Ron Campbell
20	20	"I Saw Her Standing There"	Bob Godfrey
John and Paul secretly sign George up to an ice boat race, and he partners up with a girl named Lizzy. In Madrid, when John and Paul visit a restaurant, John develops a hot foot with ashes in his boot and a woman named Rosita falls for him, causing her boyfriend Jose to challenge John to a duel. Sing Alongs: Ticket To Ride / From Me to You
21	21	"What You're Doing"	Graham C. Sharpe and Ron Campbell
21	21	"Money"	Jack Stokes
While The Beatles are on a fishing trip, Ringo runs into gypsies, one of whom falls for him and wants to marry him, so to save Ringo George comes in as a woman claiming he is engaged to Ringo. John puts Ringo in charge of keeping their money safe in his jacket pocket, but Ringo later is being followed by a mystery man at a carnival who is after the money. (The song "Help!" is heard at the beginning of this episode.) Sing Alongs: Dizzy Miss Lizzy / All My Loving
22	22	"Komm Gib Mir Deine Hand"	Ray Leach
22	22	"She Loves You"	Snav Sniekus
The Beatles visit the Bavarian Alps and end up on a mission to climb up a mountain with the dog Gunthar to put up their own flag on top. (The song "Slow Down" is heard in the background). On board a ship, the Beatles are about to rescue a girl who they think is held as a prisoner, resulting in her boyfriend, a knife thrower, coming to her defense...with knives. Sing Alongs: Bad Boy / Tell Me Why
23	23	"Bad Boy"	Graham C. Sharpe and Ron Campbell
23	23	"Tell Me Why"	Jack Stokes
In the Bavarian Alps again, the Beatles encounter a runaway named Hans who wants to be a Beatle, prompting the Fab Four to run after him with their music (in which Paul plays the bass right-handed) and take him back home. In Spain, Ringo is the jockey of a donkey that can run like a horse whenever she hears loud music. (Before the song begins, the count-off is taken from "I Saw Her Standing There".) Sing Alongs: Please Please Me / Hold Me Tight
24	24	"I Feel Fine"	Jack Stokes
24	24	"Hold Me Tight"	Barrie Helmer and Mike Jones
Paul thinks Hollywood's all phony, and actor Dick Dashing attempts to prove him wrong by putting Paul in some different movie scenes. In New York, George and Ringo visit the Statue of Liberty, where they spot a man with a package which they think is a bomb. Sing Alongs: What You're Doing / There's a Place
25	25	"Please Please Me"	Jack Stokes
25	25	"There's a Place"	Jack Stokes
In Madrid, a bull named El Taco gets knocked out, and the Beatles decide to help out the bullfight with Ringo as the matador and John and Paul as the bull. John's sympathy helps a trained ape named Mr. Marvelous to escape from the television studio and go exploring the outside world. Sing Alongs: Roll Over Beethoven / Rock and Roll Music
26	26	"Roll Over Beethoven"	Jack Stokes
26	26	"Rock and Roll Music"	Jack Stokes
The Beatles are on their way home after visiting New York City until Paul gets grabbed by an elephant named Beethoven (before the song begins, the count-off is taken from "I Saw Her Standing There".). The Beatles are invited to play at the Duke's Palace, but they are mistaken for a string quartet. Sing Alongs: I Feel Fine / She Loves You

=== Season 2 (1966) ===
- Starting this season, all episodes are animated solely at TVC, and directed by Jack Stokes.

No. overall	No. in season	Title	Animation Director
27	1	"Eight Days a Week"	Rich Cox
27	1	"I'm Looking Through You"	Edric Radage
A great movie lover named Lips Lovelace loses his ability to kiss. Paul decides to take his place in the studio with a leading lady who falls for him. The Beatles are in Egypt. They are wandering around in a pyramid until Ringo encounters a ghost who wants a body, and he chooses Ringo's. Sing Alongs: Run For Your Life / Girl (Note: Songs in Sing Alongs with no episode counterpart.)
28	2	"Help!"	Edric Radage
28	2	"We Can Work It Out"	Reg Lodge
Paul and Ringo go to a fashion show in Paris, but the designs are stolen by a thief named Jacques Le Zipper. Paul chases Jacques to the Eiffel Tower, and has trouble with heights. George becomes superstitious. The Beatles encounter the Lucky Wizard who is really a thief trying to give them bad luck and rob their money. Sing Alongs: The Night Before / Day Tripper
29	3	"I'm Down"	Reg Lodge
29	3	"Run For Your Life"	Rich Cox
The Beatles are on a tour at a wine factory in France where Ringo accidentally knocks down a vat of wine. If it does not get fixed in two hours, the factory will go out of business. (John plays an organ with his elbow during the song's solo, referencing John Lennon doing the same during the recording sessions.) The Beatles are on a tour at the Palace of Versailles. Ringo gets knocked out by a statue, and dreams about the days of Marie Antoinette. Sing Alongs: Eight Days a Week / Paperback Writer
30	4	"Drive My Car"	Edric Radage
30	4	"Tell Me What You See"	Reg Lodge
The Beatles help a young man and his girlfriend get their old jalopy running in a car race, the Popsville Hot Rod Race. While visiting "the man of a thousand faces", The Beatles fool around with his makeup machine and change into different characters. (John briefly imitates Jimmy Durante and Swee'Pea from Popeye makes a cameo.) Sing Alongs: Yesterday / We Can Work It Out
31	5	"I Call Your Name"	Rich Cox
31	5	"The Word"	Reg Lodge
Ringo is convinced to release his pet frog Bartholomew in the swamp. Later a movie producer offers a filming deal to Ringo and the frog, and the Fabs have dashed off to find Bartholomew. The Beatles are being punished after gazing at the unveiled faces of a harem. The only way to get out of the situation is to say the password: "love". Sing Alongs: She's a Woman (original broadcast, replaced in later broadcasts with a repeat of "I Feel Fine") / Wait
32	6	"All My Loving"	Edric Radage
32	6	"Day Tripper"	Reg Lodge
The Beatles are in India where they learn how to charm an animal at an "Indian Charm Skool". When the animal is revealed to be a tiger, they use music to tame it when it is about to claw John and Ringo. (The song "Love You To" is heard in the beginning of this episode). After watching the movie The Way Out Creatures From Planet Glom, the Beatles take a trip out into space with a beautiful woman who is actually an alien taking them on a one-way trip 23 billion miles from Earth. Sing Alongs: I'm Looking Through You / Nowhere Man
33	7	"Nowhere Man"	Rich Cox
33	7	"Paperback Writer"	Edric Radage
The Beatles walk into a cave for some exploring which is a home of a hermit who wants to be alone. He tries to get rid of them, but no luck. Each of the Beatles write fictional stories of how they met with Ringo as a theatre actor, Paul as a scientist, George as a secret agent, and John as a war pilot. Sing Alongs: And I Love Her / Michelle

=== Season 3 (1967) ===
No. overall	No. in season	Title	Animation Director
34	1	"Penny Lane"	Rich Cox
34	1	"Strawberry Fields"	Reg Lodge
In a spoof of James Bond, the Beatles are jealous of a detective named James Blonde who gets more attention from many women, so the Fab Four head to their hometown of Liverpool to stop a robbery on Penny Lane so they can be heroes. Traveling with their driver James, the Beatles use music to add colour and happiness to the lives of the children at an orphanage, a reference to Strawberry Field in Woolton, a suburb of Liverpool. John sums up the experience with "It's all in the mind, you know." Sing Alongs: Good Day Sunshine / Rain
35	2	"And Your Bird Can Sing"	Rich Cox
35	2	"Got To Get You Into My Life"	Rich Cox
The Beatles and a couple of hunters hunt for a rare bird called a green double-breasted tropical woosted that can sing anything, including "Hound Dog" and "She Loves You". The Beatles are in India, learning how to escape from their bodies from Swami Rivers. It works, but the problem is that the souls' bodies are moving by themselves, and they must get them before it's too late. ("Love You To" is heard in the background) Sing Alongs: Penny Lane / Eleanor Rigby
36	3	"Good Day Sunshine"	Reg Lodge
36	3	"Ticket to Ride"	Reg Lodge
Ringo thinks he's a jinx. When the Beatles arrive at Carney Island, it starts to rain (for the fourth weekend in a row), but the boys' music turns the rainy day back into a sunny day which makes Ringo happy. (The song "Little Child" is heard at the end of this episode.) The Beatles each have their own hobby: Paul paints, George builds a three-eyed robot, John writes and Ringo collects "birds" (which is English slang for girls). Paul releases the only one Ringo caught and he runs after her. Sing Alongs: Strawberry Fields Forever / And Your Bird Can Sing
37	4	"Taxman"	Brian Stevens
37	4	"Eleanor Rigby"	Rich Cox
The Beatles are delivering tons of money to pay their income tax. When they get knocked out by flying money bags, they dream they're back in the days of Robin Hood, but Paul keeps insisting "He never happened!" A group of children claim that an elderly woman named Eleanor Rigby is a witch. The Fab Four tell them the truth about Eleanor Rigby in a song and get them to see her in a new way. (The song "I Feel Fine" is heard at the end of this episode.) Sing Alongs: Got To Get You Into My Life / Here, There and Everywhere
38	5	"Tomorrow Never Knows"	Reg Lodge
38	5	"I've Just Seen a Face"	David Livesey
The Beatles fall into a well and end up in the inner world with foreign natives (Maya civilization). The chief wants the Fabs to marry his daughters, and they began to run away. (The song "Love You To" is heard during this episode.) Ringo loses his singing voice. For treatment, his three mates send Ringo to a haunted house to scare his voice back. Sing Alongs: She Said She Said / Long Tall Sally (repeat)
39	6	"Wait"	David Livesey
39	6	"I'm Only Sleeping"	Brian Stevens
The Prince of Kropotkin's girlfriend is in grave danger. The Beatles help him to save her from the Prime Minister who wants to marry her. John falls asleep while telling a story to a couple of children. In his dream he volunteers to help King Arthur and Merlin slay a vicious dragon. However, John and his mates opt instead to play music to put the dragon to sleep. Sing Alongs: Penny Lane (repeat) / Eleanor Rigby (repeat)

== Production overview ==
The series came about after Al Brodax of King Features Syndicate was approached by an ABC executive to produce a cartoon based on The Beatles to tap into their popularity. The first season was an instant hit earning a 52 share in the ratings. After the series' success, Brodax planned to produce four animated primetime television specials as well as animated series based on Herman's Hermits and Freddie and the Dreamers though these would ultimately go unrealized. The series began to slip in its second season when it aired opposite the premiere of Space Ghost and the series would be moved to Sundays during its final season.

The series consisted of short animated stories intended to set up visual illustrations of Beatles songs. In addition, there were sing-along sequences with simpler imagery complementing the full lyrics of particular songs. The songs were taken from the albums up to Revolver as well as non-album singles up to "Strawberry Fields Forever"/"Penny Lane".

The Beatles borrowed Richard Lester's fast-cutting directorial style of A Hard Day's Night and its 1965 follow-up, Help!. Hal Erickson writes in Television Cartoon Shows that the frenetic cuts "[gave] the series its breezy pace and comic impudence — which often had to compensate for some distressingly sloppy animation and infantile scripting".

The band members were not involved with the series' production beyond the use of their music recordings. US actor Paul Frees voiced John Lennon, George Harrison, and Brian Epstein (and provided additional voices), while Lance Percival voiced Paul McCartney and Ringo Starr. The female voices were provided by Julie Bennett and Carol Corbett. At first, the Beatles dismissed the series because of its poor quality. It is reported that the band members enjoyed the cartoon in later years.

Initially, the opening credits theme was a guitar riff from "A Hard Day's Night" segueing into "Can't Buy Me Love", over a cartoon sequence of the group running down a fire escape, echoing a scene in A Hard Day's Night. The second season's opening theme was "Help!", while the third season's opening theme was "And Your Bird Can Sing", over a different cartoon sequence.

Uncredited, Dennis Marks, along with Jack Mendelsohn, Heywood Kling and Bruce Howard, wrote all 39 episodes of the series.

Most of the episodes of the series were produced by Artransa Park Film Studios in Sydney, New South Wales, Australia, and George Dunning's company TVC Animation in London, with some episodes made in Hollywood, with a crew supervised by veteran cartoon writer John W. Dunn.

== Reception ==
The series was an instant ratings hit on ABC in the Saturday morning time slot after it debuted on 25 September 1965 at 10:30 AM ET. It racked up a 13 score (or 52 share), then unheard of in daytime television. The series was sponsored by the A. C. Gilbert Company, the Quaker Oats Company and the Mars Candy Company. For the third season in 1967, the series was moved to Saturdays at noon.

Originally, the Beatles disliked the cartoon; as time went on they grew to like it. In 1972, Lennon commented, "I still get a blast out of watching the Beatles cartoons on TV." In 1999, Harrison said, "I always kind of liked [the cartoons]. They were so bad or silly that they were good, if you know what I mean, and I think the passage of time might make them more fun now."

The series was syndicated worldwide on television and cable after the original run ended in 1969. In the United Kingdom, the series premiered on ITV on 3 January 1976. In 1986 and 1987, new generations were introduced to the series when it was rebroadcast by MTV and also by The Disney Channel. On MTV, the series was shown on Saturday and Sunday mornings at 10 AM ET or 7 AM PT. On The Disney Channel, the series was shown on Fridays at 5 PM beginning in 1989. Mark Hamill was a guest host of the MTV run of the series in 1987.

== Legacy ==
The Beatles' views of the cartoon series discouraged them from participating significantly in the later animated feature film, Yellow Submarine, whose producer, Al Brodax, and director, George Dunning, had also been involved in the production of the animated series. Only when the band saw and were impressed by Yellow Submarine's finished footage did they realize the film was a more ambitious creation. As a result, they agreed to appear in a short live-action epilogue for it. Lance Percival provided the voice of Fred in that film.

In December 2004, McFarlane Toys released a line of figures based on the cartoon series, featuring all four band members with their instruments. In 2005, they released a boxed set featuring cartoon figures of all four band members with instruments, plus an alligator figure, speakers, and a radio.

Apple Corps Ltd. purchased the rights to the series in the early 1990s, which has since had popular demand for a remastered release.

== Sources ==
- Axelrod, Mitchell. Beatletoons: The Real Story Behind The Cartoon Beatles. Wynn, 1999.
- Lenburg, Jeff. Encyclopedia of Animated Cartoons. Checkmark Books, 1999.
- Lehman, Christopher P. American Animated Cartoons of the Vietnam Era: A Study of Social Commentary in Films and Television Programs, 1961–1973. McFarland, 2007.
- The 39 episodes of The Beatles ABC TV cartoon series (1965-1969). archive.org. Retrieved 19 June 2025.
- "The Beatles Episode Guide - King Features Syndicate". The Big Cartoon Database.
