= Things We Said Today =

1964 single by the Beatles

- UK single B-side label

Single by the Beatles

from the album A Hard Day's Night
- A-side: "A Hard Day's Night"
- Released: 10 July 1964
- Recorded: 2–3 June 1964
- Studio: EMI, London
- Genre: Rock
- Length: 2:38
- Label: Parlophone
- Songwriter: Lennon–McCartney
- Producer: George Martin

The Beatles UK singles chronology
"Ain't She Sweet" (1964)	"A Hard Day's Night" / "Things We Said Today" (1964)	"I Feel Fine" / "She's A Woman" (1964)

"Things We Said Today" is a song by the English rock band the Beatles, written by Paul McCartney and credited to Lennon–McCartney. It was released in July 1964 as the B-side to the single "A Hard Day's Night" and on their album of the same name, except in North America, where it appeared on the album Something New. The band recorded the song twice for BBC Radio and regularly performed an abbreviated version during their 1964 North American tour.

McCartney wrote the song while holidaying in the United States Virgin Islands with his girlfriend, actress Jane Asher. The lyrics address the singer's love for a girl despite the distance between them. McCartney later described the song as exhibiting "future nostalgia", being "nostalgic about the moment we're living in now." The music is harmonically complex, using chords more typical of classical music and jazz than pop music. Between verses, it changes between major and minor keys, while the lyrics shift between the future and present tense.

"Things We Said Today" has received a favourable response from several music critics. Some reviewers said the song is more like John Lennon's style than McCartney's, with others comparing its mood to Lennon's "I'll Be Back". The song has been interpreted as relating to difficulties in McCartney's relationship with Asher, caused partly by their pursuits of different careers.

== Background and composition ==
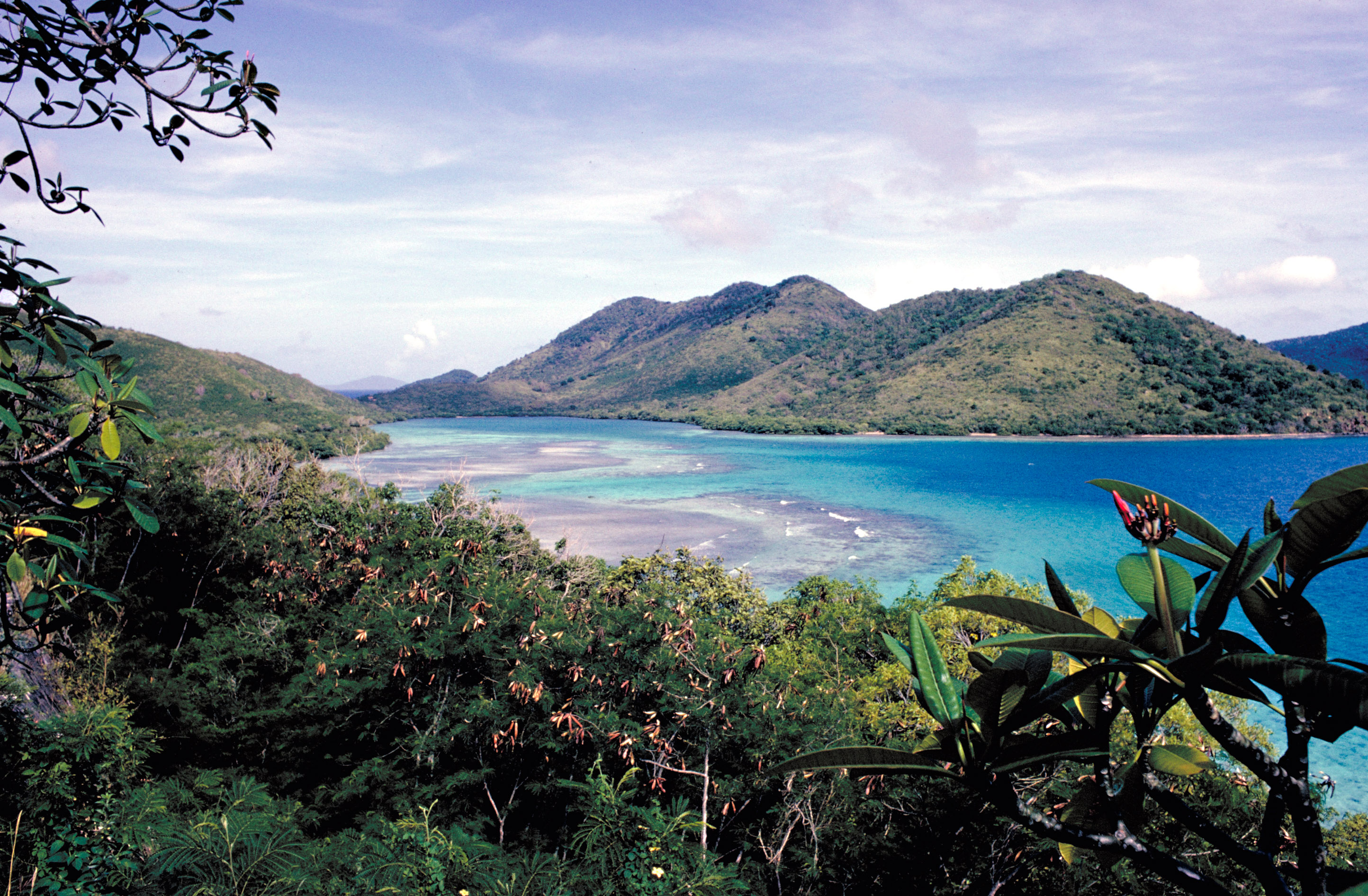
The Virgin Islands, where Paul McCartney composed "Things We Said Today" in May 1964.

Paul McCartney wrote "Things We Said Today" in May 1964 while holidaying in the United States Virgin Islands. He and his girlfriend Jane Asher travelled to Saint Thomas for the month with bandmate Ringo Starr and his girlfriend Maureen Cox. Hiring a private yacht with a crew, the Happy Days, the couples spent their time fishing, swimming and listening to Calypso music. McCartney bought a cheap acoustic guitar to "keep in practice", playing it below deck in his cabin one afternoon to distract from his seasickness. A July 1964 piece in The Beatles Monthly Book quotes him as saying: "There was something about the atmosphere there that made me quite keen on writing new songs in the evenings."

"Things We Said Today" is mostly in the natural minor key of A and is in 4/4 (common time). The song plays on alternating major and minor chords, with A minor playing in the verses before the release changes to A major. The transitions are marked by a change in harmony and an acoustic guitar flourish. The song is melodically horizontal, using chord changes typical in both classical music and jazz. It consistently uses a B♭ chord, which musicologist Alan W. Pollack writes "adds even more spice to both the melody and harmony", and is suggestive of the "exotic Phrygian mode". The chord is first heard at 0:23, substituting for a more typical change of F minor. Between verses, the song includes an extra bar of I as a vamp.

"B♭ in "Things We Said Today""
McCartney later expressed pride at the unexpected chord change from F to B♭, (heard at "... wishing you weren't so far away") a chord Walter Everett describes as "Chopinesque".

Musicologist Walter Everett writes the song's verse–refrain has an "SRDC" structure: Statement–Restatement–Departure–Conclusion. The lyrics affirm the singer's love for a girl despite the long distance between them. McCartney described the song as a "future nostalgia", with the song "[projecting] itself into the future and then is nostalgic about the moment we're living in now". In the verses the lyrics sing of the future and are in the third person, while the release changes to the present tense and the first person.

Everett writes that the "strumming of the minor chord on acoustic guitar" and "vocal arpeggiation" are reminiscent of Bob Dylan's 1963 song "Masters of War", though "the lyrics are worlds apart". He compares George Harrison's chiming of his Gretsch Country Gent guitar on the song's verse to the chiming he does on his Rickenbacker 12-string throughout the album.

== Recording ==
The Beatles recorded several songs for A Hard Day's Night on 2 June 1964, including "Things We Said Today". Recording in EMI's Studio Two, George Martin produced the session, assisted by balance engineer Norman Smith. (Note: Only seventeen years old, this was second engineer Ken Scott's first ever recording session.) After one false start, take two included both vocals and an instrumental backing. For take three, the band overdubbed several parts onto take two, with McCartney double-tracking his vocal, Starr adding a tambourine and John Lennon playing the piano. The band returned the following day, adding unspecified overdubs to the track. (Note: In Lewisohn's 1988 book The Complete Beatles Recording Sessions, he writes that 3 June was "a rehearsal only" and "not recorded". In 1993, it was discovered that the session tape had been misfiled, revealing song demos from Lennon and Harrison as well as overdubs to "Any Time At All" and "Things We Said Today".)

While the Beatles were away on their 1964 world tour, Martin, again assisted by Smith, returned to EMI on 9 June 1964. In Studio Three, they mixed "Things We Said Today" for mono from take three. They returned on 22 June to mix much of the album in Studio One, including "Things We Said Today" for stereo. Both mixes omit Lennon's piano overdub, but, due to audio leakage from the other instrument's microphones, it is still heard slightly on the released version.

== Release and reception ==
EMI's Parlophone label released "Things We Said Today" as the B-side to "A Hard Day's Night" in the UK on 10 July 1964. On the same day, they released the album A Hard Day's Night, with "Things We Said Today" sequenced as the tenth track, between "I'll Cry Instead" and "When I Get Home". The single remained number one for four weeks, while the album held the spot for 21 weeks. In the US – where Capitol Records altered the Beatles' albums track listings, reducing the number of songs and using single A- and B-sides to create further album releases – the song was instead released on the North American album Something New. Released on 20 July 1964, "Things We Said Today" is sequenced as the second track, between "I'll Cry Instead" and "Any Time At All". The album was number two for nine weeks, behind the Beatles' soundtrack album A Hard Day's Night. Both McCartney and Lennon were particularly fond of "Things We Said Today", with McCartney calling it "a sophisticated little tune".

Lennon dominated the songwriting of A Hard Day's Night; "Things We Said Today" is one of only three McCartney compositions on the album, the other two being "And I Love Her" and "Can't Buy Me Love". Journalist Mark Hertsgaard contends that, despite this disparity, McCartney's three compositions are equal to Lennon's best contributions. He considers "Things We Said Today" one of the five "masterworks" of the album, and that it "[comes] close to outshining" its A-side, "A Hard Day's Night". Music critic Wilfrid Mellers calls the song the Beatles' deepest and most beautiful song to that point. In particular, he writes that the lyric "Deep in love / Not a lot to say" is "precisely that the love experience is too deep for words. [And the music] acts this out, creating an experience no longer just happy but full of awe".

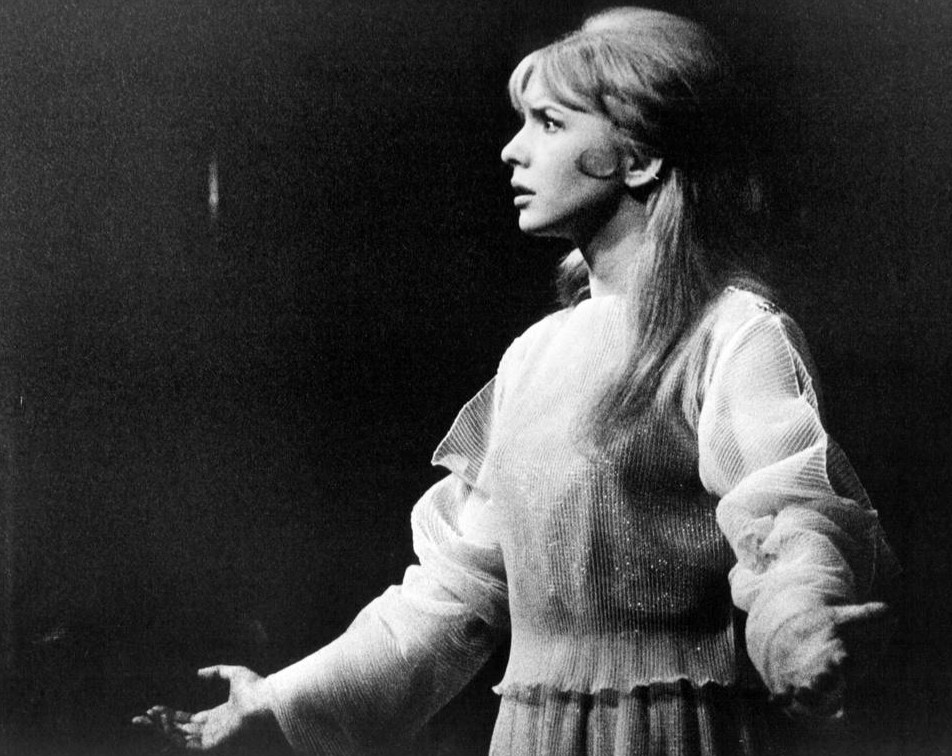
Several commentators interpret the song as relating to difficulties in McCartney's relationship with actress Jane Asher (pictured, 1967).

Author Jonathan Gould calls "Things We Said Today" a "darkly beautiful love song", writing that McCartney "holding out the ends of his lines" suggests his hope to "prolong the happiness of the present moment". Author Chris Ingham calls the song "skillful" and "haunting", displaying the same "minor-major ambivalence" heard on Lennon's "I'll Be Back". Howard Kramer of the Rock and Roll Hall of Fame also compares it to "I'll Be Back", saying they both "ring slightly of melancholy" and anticipate the style of songs heard eighteen months later on Rubber Soul. Writing for AllMusic, Richie Unterberger contends that the song was McCartney's most mature to that point. He writes that, in hindsight, its rapidly strummed acoustic guitar triplets signaled the band's turn to folk rock, pointing out that the American folk rock band the Byrds covered it in their early live shows. Tom Ewing of Pitchfork describes the song as "wintry and philosophical before the surprising, stirring middle eight". Journalist Robert Sandall suggests that the song's "mood of brooding reverie" is more closely aligned with fan's perceptions of Lennon's feelings than McCartney's. Writer Ian MacDonald also states it is closer in style to Lennon than McCartney, further writing that the song "established a model of strident dramatic contrasts" for the Beatles' next album, Beatles for Sale, heard in songs like "Baby's In Black", "Every Little Thing", "I Don't Want to Spoil the Party" and "No Reply".

In McCartney's authorised biography, Many Years From Now, Barry Miles writes that, like "And I Love Her", the song was inspired by McCartney and Asher's relationship and the frequent separation from one another they experienced due to their busy careers. MacDonald similarly writes that the sombre lyric of "Things We Said Today" was inspired by the interruptions in McCartney and Asher's relationship.

== BBC Radio and live versions ==
British law in the 1960s compelled BBC Radio to play material recorded especially for the medium. In keeping with this practice, the Beatles played "Things We Said Today" twice for radio, recording for the BBC Light Programmes Top Gear and From Us to You on 14 and 17 July 1964, respectively. The former, broadcast two days later, was the first Top Gear programme to run on BBC Radio 1. EMI included this performance on the album Live at the BBC, released in the UK and US on 30 November and 6 December 1994, respectively. The album achieved number one on the UK Music Week top 75 and number three on the Billboard 200.

The Beatles regularly performed an abbreviated version of the song during their 1964 North American tour. MacDonald writes the song's combination of "ease and effectiveness" secured its inclusion in their set list. Capitol, hoping to release a live album of the band in the US market, recorded their 23 August 1964 concert at the Hollywood Bowl in Los Angeles but deemed the recording of insufficient quality for release. In 1977, Capitol approached Martin and engineer Geoff Emerick to re-edit the tapes, along with a 30 August 1965 concert. EMI released the resulting album, The Beatles at the Hollywood Bowl, on 6 May 1977, with "Things We Said Today" sequenced as the sixth track, between "Can't Buy Me Love" and "Roll Over Beethoven". Apple released a remixed and remastered version of the album on 9 September 2016, re-titled as Live at the Hollywood Bowl. Calling the song "often-overlooked", Beatles writer Robert Rodriguez writes that the live version of "Things We Said Today" features a "rave-up bridge". Unterberg suggests that, while the song is often overlooked in modern-day listening, its inclusion in the Beatles' 1964 set list points to its major contemporaneous impact.

== Personnel ==
According to Ian MacDonald: (Note: Beatles writer John C. Winn writes that, after the 3 June overdubs, the final track includes two acoustic guitars and an electric guitar, but does not specify who played them. Everett writes the only guitars on the track were Harrison's Country Gent and Lennon's Jumbo.)

- Paul McCartney – double tracked vocal, bass
- John Lennon – acoustic rhythm guitar, piano
- George Harrison – lead guitar, harmony vocal
- Ringo Starr – drums, tambourine

== Other versions ==
American singer-songwriter Bob Dylan released a rendition of the track for the 2014 Paul McCartney tribute album The Art of McCartney. It remains the only Beatles song that Dylan has released a cover of in an official capacity. (Note: Unofficially, Dylan has done covers of the Beatles songs "Yesterday" and "Something" in a 1970 jam session recording and a 2002 live performance, respectively.)
