= Extracts from the Film A Hard Day's Night =

EP by the Beatles
- Released: 4 November 1964
- Studio: EMI, London
- Length: 9:41
- Label: Parlophone
- Producer: George Martin

The Beatles EP chronology
Long Tall Sally (1964)	Extracts from the Film A Hard Day's Night (1964)	Extracts from the Album A Hard Day's Night (1964)

Professional ratings
Review scores
Source	Rating
AllMusic	4/5 stars

Extracts from the Film A Hard Day's Night is an EP by the Beatles released on 4 November 1964 by Parlophone (catalogue number GEP 8920.) It was also released in Australia, Spain, New Zealand and France. All of the tracks also appeared on the A Hard Day's Night album.

== Track listing ==
All songs written by John Lennon and Paul McCartney.

Side one
No.	Title	Lead vocals	Length
1.	"I Should Have Known Better"	Lennon	2:43
2.	"If I Fell"	Lennon and McCartney	2:19
Total length:			5:02

Side two
No.	Title	Lead vocals	Length
1.	"Tell Me Why"	Lennon with McCartney	2:09
2.	"And I Love Her"	McCartney	2:30
Total length:			4:39

== See also ==
- Outline of the Beatles
- The Beatles timeline
