= Extracts from the Album A Hard Day's Night =

EP by the Beatles
- Released: 6 November 1964
- Studios: EMI, London
- Genre: Rock and roll
- Length: 9:17
- Label: Parlophone
- Producer: George Martin

The Beatles EP chronology
Extracts from the Film A Hard Day's Night (1964)	Extracts from the Album A Hard Day's Night (1964)	4 by the Beatles (1965)

Professional ratings
Review scores
Source	Rating
AllMusic	4/5 stars

Extracts from the Album A Hard Day's Night is the Beatles seventh official EP, released on 6 November 1964. This EP contains four tracks from the album that were not featured in the film. Its catalogue number is Parlophone GEP 8924.

== Track listing ==
All songs written by John Lennon and Paul McCartney.

Side A

1. "Any Time at All" – 2:14
2. "I'll Cry Instead" – 2:06

Side B

3. "Things We Said Today" – 2:38
4. "When I Get Home" – 2:19

== Personnel ==
- George Harrison – lead guitar, classical guitar, backing vocals
- John Lennon – vocals, rhythm guitar, acoustic guitar, piano
- Paul McCartney – vocals, bass, piano
- Ringo Starr – drums, percussion

== UK EP sales chart performance ==
- Entry date: 9 January 1965
- Highest position: 8
- Weeks on chart: 17 weeks

== See also ==
- Outline of the Beatles
- The Beatles timeline
