= A Hard Day's Night (album) =

1964 studio album by the Beatles

Studio album by the Beatles
- Released: 10 July 1964
- Recorded: 29 January – 2 June 1964
- Studios: EMI, London; Pathé Marconi, Paris
- Genres: Rock; pop rock; pop
- Length: 30:09
- Label: Parlophone
- Producer: George Martin

The Beatles chronology
With the Beatles (1963)	A Hard Day's Night (1964)	Beatles for Sale (1964)

Singles from A Hard Day's Night
- 1. "Can't Buy Me Love" b/w "You Can't Do That" Released: 20 March 1964; 2. "A Hard Day's Night" b/w "Things We Said Today" Released: 10 July 1964

A Hard Day's Night is the third studio album by the English rock band the Beatles, released on 10 July 1964 by Parlophone, with side one containing songs from the soundtrack to their film of the same name. A Hard Day's Night is the band's first album to contain all-original material, penned by John Lennon and Paul McCartney. The American version of the album was released two weeks earlier, on 26 June 1964 by United Artists Records, with a different track listing including some from George Martin's film score.

The album includes the song "A Hard Day's Night", with its distinctive opening chord, and "Can't Buy Me Love", both transatlantic number-one singles for the band. Several songs feature George Harrison playing a Rickenbacker 12-string electric guitar, with its sound influencing the Byrds and other groups in the emerging folk rock and jangle pop genres.

== Recording ==
Shortly after the release of With the Beatles (1963), the Beatles were at EMI Pathé Marconi Studios in Paris on 29 January 1964 for their first recording session outside of London. Here, they recorded German-language versions of their two most recent singles, "I Want to Hold Your Hand" and "She Loves You", titled "Komm, gib mir deine Hand" and "Sie liebt dich", respectively. According to their producer, George Martin, this was done as "they couldn't sell large quantities of records [in Germany] unless they were sung in German". Also recorded—in English—was Paul McCartney's "Can't Buy Me Love", which was completed in only four takes. Shortly afterward, the band gave their first live performance in the United States on The Ed Sullivan Show on 9 February. They gave more US performances before returning to the United Kingdom on 22 February.

The Beatles were set to begin filming their first major feature film on 2 March 1964. According to historian Mark Lewisohn, the band were set to record songs for both the film and a tie-in LP, of which the songs from the film were completed first. On 25 February—lead guitarist George Harrison's 21st birthday—the band were back at London's EMI Studios, recording John Lennon's "You Can't Do That" for release as the B-side of "Can't Buy Me Love". The band also attempted "And I Love Her" and "I Should Have Known Better" on this day and again the following day, with the former finalised on 27 February. Two more songs from the film, "Tell Me Why" and "If I Fell", were recorded on this day.

On 1 March 1964, the Beatles recorded three songs in three hours: "I'm Happy Just to Dance with You" for the film, featuring Harrison on lead vocal; a cover of Little Richard's "Long Tall Sally"; and Lennon's "I Call Your Name", which was originally given to Billy J. Kramer and the Dakotas the previous year. Mono and stereo mixing was carried out over the following two weeks. The "Can't Buy Me Love" / "You Can't Do That" single was released on 16 March and topped charts worldwide. Taking a break for filming, drummer Ringo Starr coined the phrase "a hard day's night", providing the film with its title. Lennon and McCartney wrote a song based on the title, which was recorded at EMI on 16 April and mixed four days later.

On 1 June, with the film completed and the band returning from holidays, the Beatles returned to EMI, recording the remaining songs for the tie-in LP, with outtakes appearing on the Long Tall Sally EP. Covers of Carl Perkins' "Matchbox", with Starr on lead vocals, and Larry Williams' "Slow Down", appeared on the EP, while Lennon's "I'll Cry Instead" and "I'll Be Back" appeared on the LP. The following day on 2 June, the band completed Lennon's "Any Time at All" and "When I Get Home", and McCartney's "Things We Said Today". The band spent the remainder of June and July touring internationally.

== Content ==
Musically, A Hard Day's Night eschews the rock and roll cover songs of the band's previous albums for a predominantly pop sound. Sputnikmusic's Dave Donnelly observes "short, peppy" pop songs characterised by layered vocals, immediate choruses, and understated instrumentation. According to Pitchfork's Tom Ewing, the lack of rock and roll covers allows listeners to "take the group's new sound purely on its own modernist terms", with audacious "chord choices", powerful harmonies, "gleaming" guitar, and "Northern" harmonica. Music journalist Robert Christgau writes that Lennon–McCartney's songs were "more sophisticated musically" than before. It also features Harrison playing a Rickenbacker 12-string electric guitar, a sound that was influential on the Byrds and other bands in the folk rock explosion of 1965.

Side one of the LP contains the songs from the film soundtrack. Side two contains songs written for, but not included in, the film, although a 1980s re-release of the film includes a prologue before the opening credits with "I'll Cry Instead" on the soundtrack. The title of the album and film was the accidental creation of Starr. According to Lennon in a 1980 interview with Playboy magazine: "I was going home in the car and [film director] Dick Lester suggested the title, 'Hard Day's Night' from something Ringo had said. I had used it in In His Own Write, but it was an off-the-cuff remark by Ringo. You know, one of those malapropisms. A Ringo-ism, where he said it not to be funny ... just said it. So Dick Lester said, 'We are going to use that title.'"

A Hard Day's Night is the first Beatles album to feature entirely original compositions, and the only one where all the songs were written by Lennon–McCartney. Lennon is the primary author of nine of the thirteen tracks on the album, as well as being the lead singer on these same nine tracks (although Paul McCartney sings lead on the title track's middle-eight). Lennon and McCartney co-wrote "I'm Happy Just to Dance with You", sung by Harrison, while McCartney wrote "And I Love Her", "Can't Buy Me Love" and "Things We Said Today". It is one of three Beatles albums, along with Let It Be and Magical Mystery Tour, in which Starr does not sing lead vocal on any songs. (Starr sang the lead vocal on "Matchbox" during the sessions; it appeared instead on the Long Tall Sally EP.) It is also one of three Beatles albums, along with Please Please Me and Beatles for Sale, in which Harrison does not contribute to the songwriting.

== Critical reception and legacy ==
Professional ratings
Review scores
Source	Rating
AllMusic	5/5 stars
The A.V. Club	A
Blender	4/5 stars
Consequence of Sound	A−
The Daily Telegraph	5/5 stars
Encyclopedia of Popular Music	5/5 stars
Paste	100/100
Pitchfork	9.7/10
The Rolling Stone Album Guide	5/5 stars
Sputnikmusic	4.5/5

According to music critic Richie Unterberger, writing for AllMusic:

George Harrison's resonant 12-string electric guitar leads [on A Hard's Day's Night] were hugely influential; the movie helped persuade the Byrds, then folksingers, to plunge all out into rock & roll, and the Beatles would be hugely influential on the folk-rock explosion of 1965. The Beatles' success, too, had begun to open the US market for fellow English bands like the Rolling Stones, the Animals, and the Kinks, and inspired young American groups like the Beau Brummels, Lovin' Spoonful, and others to mount a challenge of their own with self-penned material that owed a great debt to Lennon–McCartney.

In his book Yeah! Yeah! Yeah!: The Story of Pop Music from Bill Haley to Beyoncé, Bob Stanley identifies A Hard Day's Night as the album that best captures the band's early-career appeal. He writes:

If you had to explain the Beatles' impact to a stranger, you'd play them the soundtrack to A Hard Day's Night. The songs, conceived in a hotel room in a spare couple of weeks between up-ending the British class system and conquering America, were full of bite and speed. There was adventure, knowingness, love, and abundant charm.

A Hard Day's Night was included in the list of "100 Essential Rock Albums" compiled by musicologists Charlie Gillett and Simon Frith for ZigZag magazine in 1975, and is one of the "Treasure Island albums" featured in Greil Marcus's 1979 book Stranded. In 2000, Q magazine placed A Hard Day's Night at number 5 on its list "The 100 Greatest British Albums Ever". That same year, it appeared at number 22 in Colin Larkin's book All Time Top 1000 Albums. In 2012, Rolling Stone ranked it 307th on the magazine's list of the 500 Greatest Albums of All Time. In the 2020 revision, it rose to number 263. In 2000, the album was inducted into the Grammy Hall of Fame.

A Hard Day's Night has also appeared in critics' lists of the best albums of all time published by the NME, in 1974 (at number 33), 1985 (number 73) and 2013 (number 195); Mojo, in 1995 (number 81); and Uncut, in 2016 (number 149). It was a featured album in The Mojo Collection: The Greatest Albums of All Time, Tom Moon's book 1,000 Recordings to Hear Before You Die and Robert Dimery's 1001 Albums You Must Hear Before You Die, and was selected as one of the "Most Significant Rock Albums" in the Greenwood Encyclopedia of Rock History.

== Reissues ==
On 26 February 1987, A Hard Day's Night was officially released on CD in mono, along with Please Please Me, With the Beatles, and Beatles for Sale. Having been available only as an import in the US in the past, the 13 track UK version of the album was also issued in the US on LP and cassette on 21 July 1987. Stereo mixes of "A Hard Day's Night", "Can't Buy Me Love", and "And I Love Her" had been made available on the first compact disc issue of 1962–1966 in 1993. Most of the rest of the tracks appeared in stereo on CD for the first time with the release of the box set The Capitol Albums, Volume 1 in 2004.

On 9 September 2009, a remastered version of this album was released and was the first time the album appeared in stereo on CD in its entirety. This album is also included in The Beatles: Stereo Box Set. A remastered mono version of the original UK album was part of The Beatles in Mono box set. A 60th anniversary reissue of the album was released on 19 October 2024 to celebrate National Album Day.

== Track listing ==
All tracks are written by Lennon–McCartney.

Side one of the UK & Australian LP release (& soundtrack to the 1964 United Artists film A Hard Day's Night)
No.	Title	Lead vocals	Length
1.	"A Hard Day's Night"	Lennon with McCartney	2:34
2.	"I Should Have Known Better"	Lennon	2:43
3.	"If I Fell"	Lennon and McCartney	2:19
4.	"I'm Happy Just to Dance with You"	Harrison	1:56
5.	"And I Love Her"	McCartney	2:30
6.	"Tell Me Why"	Lennon with McCartney and Harrison	2:09
7.	"Can't Buy Me Love"	McCartney	2:12
Total length:			16:23

Side two
No.	Title	Lead vocals	Length
1.	"Any Time at All"	Lennon	2:11
2.	"I'll Cry Instead"	Lennon	1:44
3.	"Things We Said Today"	McCartney	2:35
4.	"When I Get Home"	Lennon	2:17
5.	"You Can't Do That"	Lennon	2:35
6.	"I'll Be Back"	Lennon with McCartney	2:24
Total length:			13:46

== North American release ==
A Hard Day's Night
- 1964 stereo United Artists release

Soundtrack album by the Beatles and George Martin
- Released: 26 June 1964
- Recorded: 29 January – 4 June 1964
- Studios: EMI, London; Pathé Marconi, Paris
- Genres: Rock, instrumental
- Length: 29:47
- Label: United Artists
- Producer: George Martin

The Beatles North American chronology
The Beatles' Long Tall Sally (1964)	A Hard Day's Night (1964)	Something New (1964)

The Beatles United States chronology
The Beatles' Second Album (1964)	A Hard Day's Night (1964)	Something New (1964)

Singles from A Hard Day's Night
- 1. "Can't Buy Me Love" Released: 16 March 1964; 2. "A Hard Day's Night" Released: 13 July 1964; 3. "Ringo's Theme (This Boy)" Released: July 1964; 4. "And I Love Her" Released: 20 July 1964

A Hard Day's Night – Original Motion Picture Sound Track, the American version of the album, was released on 26 June 1964 by United Artists Records in both mono and stereo, the fourth Beatles album in the United States. The album went to number one on the Billboard album chart, spending 14 weeks there, the longest run of any album that year. United Artists rushed the album into stores over a month before the film's US premiere; as a result, the Beatles had both the number-one album and number-one single in the country when A Hard Day's Night opened on 11 August 1964.

All seven songs from the film, the first side of the UK album, were featured along with "I'll Cry Instead", which, although written for the film, was cut at the last minute. The omitted tracks from side two were spread across the Capitol Records LPs The Beatles' Second Album, Beatles '65 and Something New although this last album, using a misleading name, contained five tracks already issued in the US soundtrack album.

This album also included four orchestral instrumental versions of Lennon and McCartney songs arranged by George Martin conducting an orchestra of studio musicians: "I Should Have Known Better", "And I Love Her", "Ringo's Theme" (featuring Vic Flick on lead guitar), and "A Hard Day's Night". After EMI acquired United Artists Records, this album was reissued in August 1980 on the Capitol label, catalogue SW-11921.

While the stereo version of the album included the instrumental tracks in true stereo, the Beatles' own recordings appeared as electronically rechannelled stereo recordings made from the mono releases. The 1980 Capitol Records reissue used the same master tape as the original United Artists LP release in fake stereo, despite the availability of several tracks with official true stereo remixes. True stereo versions of most of the songs had been issued on the Capitol album Something New, released in July 1964. "Can't Buy Me Love" and "I Should Have Known Better" finally appeared in stereo on the 1970 Apple Records compilation Hey Jude. The title track did not appear in true stereo in the US until the 1982 Capitol compilation album Reel Music. In 2014, the American version of A Hard Day's Night was released on CD individually and in a boxed set of all the other US Beatles albums to celebrate the fiftieth anniversary of the Beatles first US visit. This CD reissue features all of the songs in both true stereo and mono mixes. In 2024, the album was reissued on vinyl as part of The Beatles: 1964 U.S. Albums in Mono, using the original master tapes.

In 2000, the 1964 North American release of A Hard Day's Night by The Beatles on the United Artists label was inducted into the Grammy Hall of Fame.

=== Track listing ===
Side one
No.	Title	Lead vocals	Length
1.	"A Hard Day's Night"	Lennon and McCartney	2:33
2.	"Tell Me Why"	Lennon	2:10
3.	"I'll Cry Instead"	Lennon	2:06
4.	"I Should Have Known Better"	instrumental	2:10
5.	"I'm Happy Just to Dance with You"	Harrison	1:59
6.	"And I Love Her"	instrumental	3:46
Total length:			14:44

Side two
No.	Title	Lead vocals	Length
1.	"I Should Have Known Better"	Lennon	2:44
2.	"If I Fell"	Lennon and McCartney	2:22
3.	"And I Love Her"	McCartney	2:29
4.	"Ringo's Theme (This Boy)"	instrumental	3:10
5.	"Can't Buy Me Love"	McCartney	2:12
6.	"A Hard Day's Night"	instrumental	2:06
Total length:			15:03

== Personnel ==
The Beatles

- John Lennon – lead, harmony and backing vocals; acoustic, rhythm and lead guitars; harmonica on "I Should Have Known Better"; piano on "Things We Said Today"
- Paul McCartney – lead, harmony and backing vocals; bass guitar; piano on "When I Get Home"; cowbell on "You Can't Do That"
- George Harrison – harmony and backing vocals, lead vocals on "I'm Happy Just To Dance With You"; lead (six- and twelve-string), acoustic and classical guitars
- Ringo Starr – drums, percussion

Additional personnel

- George Martin – piano on "Tell Me Why", production, orchestrations of instrumentals for film and American LP

== Charts and certifications ==
=== Chart performance ===
Weekly chart performance for A Hard Day's Night
Chart (1964–65)	Peak position
Australia (Kent Music Report)	1
German Albums (Offizielle Top 100)	1
Finland (Suomen virallinen lista)	1
UK Record Retailer LPs Chart	1
US Billboard Top LPs	1
Chart (1987)	Peak position
Dutch Albums (Album Top 100)	20
Chart (2009)	Peak position
Austrian Albums (Ö3 Austria)	66
Belgian Albums (Ultratop Flanders)	68
Belgian Albums (Ultratop Wallonia)	80
Dutch Albums (Album Top 100)	86
Finnish Albums (Suomen virallinen lista)	27
Italian Albums (FIMI)	73
New Zealand Albums (RMNZ)	28
Portuguese Albums (AFP)	28
Spanish Albums (Promusicae)	61
Swedish Albums (Sverigetopplistan)	29
Swiss Albums (Schweizer Hitparade)	60

=== Certifications ===
Original release

Certifications for A Hard Day's Night original release
Region	Certification	Certified units/sales
Australia (ARIA)	Gold	35,000^{^}
New Zealand (RMNZ) Reissue	Platinum	15,000^{^}
United Kingdom (BPI) 2009 Reissue	Platinum	300,000^{*}
^{*} Sales figures based on certification alone.^{^} Shipments figures based on certification alone.

North American release

Certifications for A Hard Day's Night North American release
Region	Certification	Certified units/sales
Canada (Music Canada)	Platinum	100,000^{^}
United States (RIAA)	4× Platinum	4,000,000^{^}
^{^} Shipments figures based on certification alone.

== See also ==
- Outline of the Beatles
- The Beatles timeline
- The Beatles albums discography

== Sources ==
- Badman, Keith (2001). The Beatles Off the Record. Omnibus Press.
- Everett, Walter (2001). The Beatles as Musicians: The Quarry Men Through Rubber Soul. New York, NY: Oxford University Press. ISBN 0-19-514105-9.
- Gould, Jonathan (2007). Can't Buy Me Love: The Beatles, Britain and America. New York: Three Rivers Press. ISBN 978-0-307-35338-2.
- Guesdon, Jean-Michel; Margotin, Philippe (2014). All The Songs: The Story Behind Every Beatles Release. Running Press. p. 149. ISBN 978-1-60376-371-4. Archived from the original on 2 May 2021.
- Hook, Chris (2 May 2005). "The "A Hard Day's Night" Chord – Rock's Holy Grail". Archived from the original on 31 October 2012.
- Lewisohn, Mark (1988). The Beatles Recording Sessions. New York: Harmony Books. ISBN 978-0-517-57066-1.
- Lewisohn, Mark (1992). The Complete Beatles Chronicle:The Definitive Day-By-Day Guide To the Beatles' Entire Career (2010 ed.). Chicago: Chicago Review Press. ISBN 978-1-56976-534-0.
- MacDonald, Ian (1994). Revolution in the Head: The Beatles' Records and the Sixties (1st. ed.). New York: Henry Holt and Company. p. 90. ISBN 0805027807.
- Spignesi, Stephen J.; Lewis, Michael (2004). Here, There, and Everywhere: The 100 Best Beatles Songs. New York: Black Dog. ISBN 978-1-57912-369-7. "...after the unabashed more-or-less traditional pop rock of A Hard Day's Night and Help!..."
- Miles, Barry (1997). Paul McCartney: Many Years From Now (1st Hardcover ed.). Henry Holt & Company. ISBN 978-0-8050-5248-0.
- Collett-White, Mike (7 April 2009). "Original Beatles digitally remastered". Reuters. Archived from the original on 30 November 2009.
- "The 500 Greatest Albums of All Time". Rolling Stone. 1 November 2003. Archived from the original on 24 October 2010.
- Sheff, David (2000). All We Are Saying: The Last Major Interview with John Lennon and Yoko Ono. New York, NY: St. Martin's Press. ISBN 978-0-312-25464-3.
- Stanley, Bob (2014). Yeah! Yeah! Yeah!: The Story of Pop Music from Bill Haley to Beyoncé. New York, NY: W.W. Norton. ISBN 978-0-393-24269-0. Archived from the original on 2 May 2021.
- Whitburn, Joel (2001). Top Pop Albums 1955–2001. Menomonee Falls, WI: Record Research. ISBN 9780898201475.
