= I'm Happy Just to Dance with You =

1964 single by the Beatles

- US picture sleeve (reverse)

Single by the Beatles

from the album A Hard Day's Night
- A-side: "I'll Cry Instead"
- Released: 20 July 1964
- Recorded: 1 March 1964
- Studio: EMI, London
- Genre: Rock
- Length: 1:58
- Label: Capitol (US)
- Songwriter: Lennon–McCartney
- Producer: George Martin

The Beatles US singles chronology
"And I Love Her" (1964)	"I'll Cry Instead" / "I'm Happy Just to Dance with You" (1964)	"Matchbox" (1964)

"I'm Happy Just to Dance with You" is a song written by John Lennon and Paul McCartney and recorded in 1964 by the English rock band the Beatles for the film soundtrack to A Hard Day's Night. Lead vocals are by George Harrison, whose performance in the film marked the first mass media depiction of Harrison singing lead.

== Composition ==
The song was written specifically for George Harrison to sing. Years later, McCartney referred to it as a "formula song," while Lennon remarked, "I would never have sung it myself."

Musically, the track stands out for its contrast between a frenetic rhythm guitar and Harrison’s calm, understated vocal delivery. One of its notable compositional features is an unexpected chord change in the chorus—an augmented B7th on the line "I'm happy just to dance with you." The song is also distinctive in its structure, beginning not with a verse or chorus but with the final four bars of the bridge. According to musicologist Ian MacDonald, the guitar part was inspired by the Rolling Stones' cover of Buddy Holly's "Not Fade Away."

Cash Box praised the song as "a stomp-a-rhythmic delight."

== Recording ==
The Beatles recorded "I'm Happy Just to Dance with You" on a Sunday, the first time they had used EMI Recording Studios on a day other than a normal work day. United Artists released the song on the album A Hard Day's Night on 26 June. It was also included on the album Something New, released by Capitol Records on 20 July. It hit #95 on the Billboard Top 100 chart on 1 August 1964, its only appearance on that chart. It is one of only two Lennon–McCartney songs sung by Harrison during the group's career, the other song being "Do You Want to Know a Secret".

The group also recorded a version for the BBC's From Us to You radio show. The session took place on 17 July 1964 at the BBC Paris Studio in London, and was first broadcast on 3 August that year. An instrumental piano-only version is heard in the A Hard Day's Night film, during rehearsals for a musical television broadcast.

== Personnel ==
According to Ian MacDonald:

- George Harrison – lead vocal, lead guitar
- John Lennon – backing vocal, rhythm guitar
- Paul McCartney – backing vocal, bass
- Ringo Starr – drums, African drum
- George Martin – producer
- Norman Smith – engineer

== Anne Murray cover ==
"I'm Happy Just to Dance with You"

Single by Anne Murray

from the album Somebody's Waiting
- B-side: "What's Forever For"
- Released: June 1980
- Genre: Easy listening, adult contemporary
- Length: 3:51
- Label: Capitol (US)
- Songwriter: Lennon–McCartney
- Producer: Jim Ed Norman

Anne Murray singles chronology
"Lucky Me" (1980)	"I'm Happy Just to Dance with You" (1980)	"Could I Have This Dance" (1980)

Anne Murray included a cover of "I'm Happy Just to Dance with You" on her 1980 album Somebody's Waiting. Murray had had some success in previous years covering other Beatles songs such as "You Won't See Me" and "Day Tripper." Unlike the Beatles' original, Murray's version of "I'm Happy Just to Dance with You" is an adult-contemporary ballad. Murray's version of the song was released as a single in mid-1980, reaching No. 64 on the Billboard Hot 100, No. 23 on the Billboard country chart, and No. 13 Adult Contemporary.

== Chart performance ==
The Beatles

Chart (1964)	Peak position
CAN CHUM Chart	20
CAN RPM	32
US Billboard Hot 100	95
US Cash Box Top 100	91

Anne Murray

Chart (1980)	Peak position
Canada RPM Adult Contemporary	1
Canada RPM Country	10
Canada RPM Top Singles	74
US Billboard Hot 100	64
US Billboard Hot Country Songs	23
US Billboard Adult Contemporary	13

== Other cover versions ==
- The Cyrkle released a version of the song on their 1967 album, Neon.
- Randy Bachman and Burton Cummings included a cover of the song on their 2007 album Jukebox. The Smithereens also released a cover on their 2008 album, B-Sides The Beatles.

== Later uses ==
Tori Kelly sang the song as the character Millie Pede in Beat Bugs, an Australian-Canadian animated children's television series.
