= Tell Me Why (Beatles song) =

- Cover to Parlophone single for export release

Song by the Beatles

from the album A Hard Day's Night
- Released: 10 July 1964
- Recorded: 27 February 1964
- Studio: EMI, London
- Genre: Rock and roll; doo-wop
- Length: 2:10
- Label: Parlophone
- Songwriter: Lennon–McCartney
- Producer: George Martin

"Tell Me Why" is a song by English rock band the Beatles from their album A Hard Day's Night. In North America, it was released on both the American version of A Hard Day's Night and the album Something New. Credited to Lennon–McCartney, it was written by John Lennon in either Paris or New York City, and recorded in eight takes on 27 February 1964.

== Composition ==
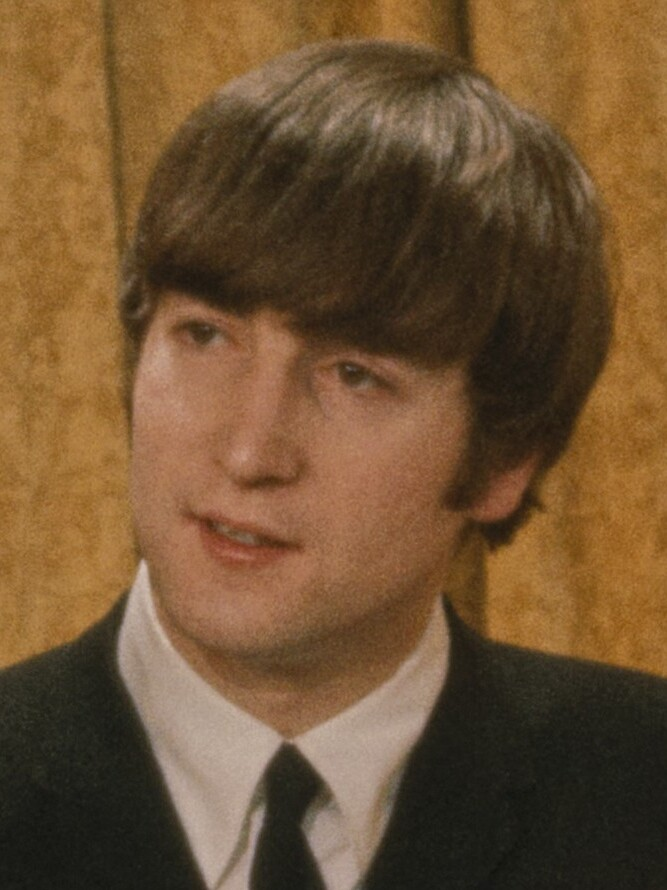
Lennon sang lead vocals and played rhythm guitar on the song.

Paul McCartney said:

I think a lot of these [Lennon's] songs like "Tell Me Why" may have been based in real experiences or affairs John was having, or arguments with Cynthia [Lennon’s wife] or whatever, but it never occurred to us until later to put that slant on it all.

Lennon described the song as resembling "a black New York girl-group song". Its basic structure of simple doo-wop chord changes and block harmonies over a walking bass line "creates an illusion of sincerity through its sheer attack".

The song is in the key of D major. John, Paul and George sing a three-part harmony. In the chorus, John's lead vocal part sits higher than George's, and more unusual in this case, Paul's harmonies.

== Release ==
"Tell Me Why" was performed in the Beatles' debut feature film, A Hard Day's Night. The song was part of the "studio performance" sequence, which was filmed at the Scala Theatre, London, on 31 March 1964. That marks the only time the song was ever performed in front of a live audience, which consisted of 350 paid actors, one of whom was a thirteen-year old Phil Collins. The song was mimed by the Beatles and the words were lip-synced on stage.

== Releases ==
- Included on the British LP A Hard Day's Night.
- Included on the British EP Extracts from the Film A Hard Day's Night.
- Included on the North American LP A Hard Day's Night.
- Included on the North American LP Something New.
- B-side of the Parlophone single "If I Fell". It was one of three singles that Parlophone produced for export but not for release in the U.K.
- On Italian and French releases, "Tell Me Why" is featured as the B-side of "I Should Have Known Better".

== Personnel ==
- John Lennon – lead vocal, rhythm guitar
  - Lennon's vocal is double-tracked in the stereo version, but single-tracked in the mono mix.
- Paul McCartney – harmony vocal, bass
- George Harrison – harmony vocal, lead guitar
- Ringo Starr – drums
- George Martin – piano

Personnel per MacDonald

== Covers ==
- In 1965, The Beach Boys covered "Tell Me Why" on their Beach Boys' Party! album.
- In 1982, April Wine covered it on their album Power Play. It reached #46 in Canada.
- In 1986, The Chenille Sisters covered the song, as a medley with "Chains", on their self-titled first album.
- In 2002, The Punkles did a cover of the song on their second album, Punk!.
