= If I Fell =

- US picture sleeve (reverse)

Single by the Beatles

from the album A Hard Day's Night
- A-side: "And I Love Her"
- Released: 20 July 1964
- Recorded: 27 February 1964
- Studio: EMI, London
- Genre: Pop
- Length: 2:22
- Label: Capitol (US)
- Songwriter: Lennon–McCartney
- Producer: George Martin

The Beatles US singles chronology
"A Hard Day's Night" (1964)	"And I Love Her" / "If I Fell" (1964)	"I'll Cry Instead" (1964)

"If I Fell" is a song by English rock band the Beatles which first appeared in 1964 on the album A Hard Day's Night in the United Kingdom and United States, and on the North American album Something New. It was written primarily by John Lennon and credited to Lennon–McCartney. "That's my first attempt at a ballad proper. ... It shows that I wrote sentimental love ballads way back when", Lennon stated in his 1980 Playboy interview. Paul McCartney stated much later that he contributed to the song: "We wrote 'If I Fell' together."

== Recording and performance ==
Lennon and McCartney shared a single microphone "for their Everly Brothers-like close harmonies".

Like much of the Beatles' early work, the song was released in two different mixes for mono and stereo. Lennon's opening vocal is single-tracked in mono but double-tracked in the stereo mix.

== Single releases ==
"If I Fell" was released as the B-side of the US single "And I Love Her" on Capitol 5235. As the B-side, it reached number 53 on the Billboard Hot 100. It reached number 28 in Canada. The song was also released as a single in Norway, where it reached number one.

In the UK, it was released on 4 December 1964 as the A-side of a single (b/w "Tell Me Why") on Parlophone DP 562. The single was intended for export, but some retailers sold it in the UK anyway. It did not chart there and is generally not considered an "official" UK single.

== Charts ==
Weekly chart performance for "If I Fell"
Chart (1964–1965)	Peak position
Italy (Musica e dischi)	38
Netherlands (Single Top 100)	3
Norway (VG-lista)	1
US Billboard Hot 100	53
West Germany (Media Control)	25

== Personnel ==
According to Ian MacDonald, except where noted:

- John Lennon – double-tracked vocal, acoustic rhythm guitar
- Paul McCartney – double-tracked vocal, bass
- George Harrison – twelve-string lead guitar
- Ringo Starr – drums
