= Long Tall Sally (EP) =

EP by the Beatles
- Released: 19 June 1964
- Recorded: 1 March, 1 & 4 June 1964
- Studio: EMI, London
- Genre: Rock and roll
- Length: 9:06
- Label: Parlophone
- Producer: George Martin

The Beatles EP chronology
Four by the Beatles (1964)	Long Tall Sally (1964)	Extracts from the Film A Hard Day's Night (1964)

Professional ratings
Review scores
Source	Rating
AllMusic	4/5 stars

Long Tall Sally is the fifth UK EP release by the English rock band the Beatles and the band's first UK EP to include songs not previously released on an album or single in the United Kingdom. (Side 1 had been released in America that April, on The Beatles' Second Album, while Side 2 would be released in July on the North American album Something New.) It was released by Parlophone in mono, with the catalogue number GEP 8913, and released in the United Kingdom on 19 June 1964. It was also released in Spain and France.

The EP includes three cover versions—the title track, "Slow Down" and "Matchbox"—as well as one Lennon-McCartney original, "I Call Your Name", a song originally given to Billy J. Kramer and his backing band, The Dakotas. Kramer had released the song as the B-side of another Lennon-McCartney song, "Bad to Me", which reached number 1 in the UK and number 9 in the US. In 1988, all four of the songs from the EP were included on the compilation album Past Masters, Volume One.

The picture on the EP cover was taken by Robert Freeman, as stated on the back.

== Track listing ==
Side one
No.	Title	Lead vocals	Length
1.	"Long Tall Sally" (Enotris Johnson, Richard Penniman, Robert Blackwell)	McCartney	2:03
2.	"I Call Your Name" (Lennon–McCartney)	Lennon	2:09
Total length:			4:12

Side two
No.	Title	Lead vocals	Length
1.	"Slow Down" (Larry Williams)	Lennon	2:56
2.	"Matchbox" (Carl Perkins)	Starr	1:58
Total length:			4:54

== Personnel ==
According to Ian MacDonald:

The Beatles

- John Lennon – lead vocals, rhythm guitar; lead guitar ("Slow Down")
- Paul McCartney – bass; lead vocal ("Long Tall Sally")
- George Harrison – lead and rhythm guitars
- Ringo Starr – drums; cowbell ("I Call Your Name"); lead vocal ("Matchbox")

Additional personnel

- George Martin – piano, producer
- Norman Smith – engineer

== Other releases ==
- In the United States, the EP was split and released on The Beatles' Second Album ("Long Tall Sally" and "I Call Your Name") and Something New ("Slow Down" and "Matchbox").
- In Canada, the first two tracks were included on a full-length album of the same name, The Beatles' Long Tall Sally.
- In 1976, the four tracks on the EP were issued as part of the double album Rock 'n' Roll Music, a collection of 28 Beatles recordings. This marked the UK stereo debut of these tracks on an album.
- In 1978, the tracks were again included on the UK LP Rarities, first released as part of The Beatles Collection, then individually in the UK, with all four songs appearing in mono. The US version of Rarities featured a different track listing and did not include the Long Tall Sally EP songs, since they had all been previously released on American albums.
- In 1988, the EP was compiled with the Beatles' singles and released as part of the Past Masters collection, which, when combined with the 12 original British albums plus the American album Magical Mystery Tour, made all of the Beatles' UK releases available on compact disc. Once again, the four songs were in stereo.
- The EP was reissued in 1992 as part of the 15-disc Compact Disc EP Collection, featuring the songs in their original monophonic sound.
- In December 2004, Capitol Records issued a four-disc CD boxed set, The Capitol Albums, Volume 1, which included reissues of the first four American Capitol albums on compact disc for the first time. The songs "Long Tall Sally" and "I Call Your Name" were on disc 2 (The Beatles' Second Album), with "Slow Down" and "Matchbox" on disc 3 (Something New). The songs on all four discs were presented in both mono and stereo.
- In 2009, the Beatles' UK recordings were remastered and reissued again, in both stereo and mono, with both formats available as boxed sets and the former also available as individual releases. The stereo releases included Past Masters, while the mono box set contained a new mono version of the compilation, Mono Masters, making all of the Long Tall Sally tracks available in both formats simultaneously.
- On 28 November 2014, the EP was reissued in limited numbers to independently owned record stores for Record Store Day.

== Charts ==
Chart performance for Long Tall Sally
Chart (2014)	Peak position
US Billboard 200	196

== See also ==
- Outline of The Beatles
- The Beatles timeline
