= When I Get Home (song) =

1964 song by the Beatles

- Cover of the song's sheet music

Song by the Beatles

from the album A Hard Day's Night
- Released: 10 July 1964
- Recorded: 2 June 1964
- Studio: EMI, London
- Genre: Rock and roll
- Length: 2:18
- Label: Parlophone
- Songwriter: Lennon–McCartney
- Producer: George Martin

"When I Get Home" is a song written by John Lennon (credited to Lennon–McCartney), and recorded by the English rock band the Beatles on 2 June 1964, during the last session for their third studio album A Hard Day's Night (1964). Its first US release was on the Something New LP.

Influenced somewhat by the Shirelles, "When I Get Home" is essentially a rock and roll number, but with unusual chord progressions. Lennon liked this particular ploy, and used it on many of his songs at the time. Typical also of this period of the Beatles is the vocal leap into falsetto.

Music critic Allan Kozinn described "When I Get Home" as "a soul-tinged rocker, [that] has the singer impatient for a reunion with his sweetheart – yet there is also a faint undercurrent of extracurricular activity in the lyrics. 'I've got no business being here with you,' he sings, and after a telling pause he adds, 'this way.'"

== Recording ==
After completing "When I Get Home" in 11 takes, the Beatles finished recording another Lennon song, "Any Time at All", which they had started work on earlier that day. They also recorded Paul McCartney's "Things We Said Today" during the same session.

A mono mix was made on 4 June 1964, although this was replaced when new mono and stereo mixes were made on 22 June.

== Cover versions ==
The band Yellow Matter Custard covered the song for their CD/DVD release One Night In New York City.

There have also been covers by the Rustix, Tony Visconti and Alejandro Escovedo.

== Personnel ==
- John Lennon – lead vocal, rhythm guitar
- Paul McCartney – harmony vocal, bass, piano
- George Harrison – harmony vocal, lead guitar
- Ringo Starr – drums

Personnel per Ian MacDonald, except where noted.
