= Any Time at All =

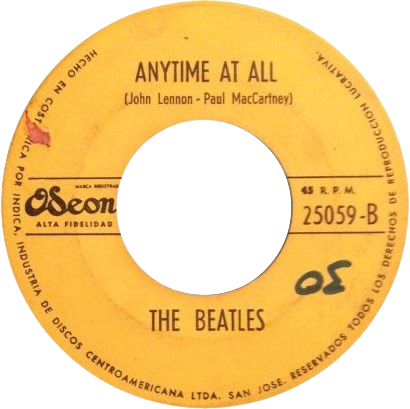
- B-side label from the 1964 Costa Rican single, with "I'll Cry Instead" as the A-side

Song by the Beatles

from the album A Hard Day's Night
- Released: 10 July 1964
- Recorded: 2 June 1964
- Studio: EMI, London
- Genre: Rock
- Length: 2:13
- Label: Parlophone
- Songwriter: Lennon–McCartney
- Producer: George Martin

"Any Time at All" is a song by the English rock band the Beatles. Credited to the Lennon–McCartney partnership, it was mainly composed by John Lennon, with an instrumental middle eight by Paul McCartney. It first appeared on the Beatles' A Hard Day's Night album.

== Origin ==
In his 1980 interview with Playboy, Lennon described the song as "An effort at writing 'It Won't Be Long'. Same idea: C to A minor, C to A minor—with me shouting."

Lyrically, the song appears similar to the 1963 song "All I've Got to Do" from the album With the Beatles.

Lennon's handwritten lyrics for "Any Time at All" were sold for £6,000 to an unidentified individual at an auction held at Sotheby's in London, on 8 April 1988.

== Recording ==
Incomplete when first brought into EMI Studios on Tuesday 2 June 1964, Paul McCartney suggested an idea for the middle eight section based solely on chords, which was recorded with the intention of adding lyrics later. But by the time it needed to be mixed, the middle eight was still without words, and that is how it appears on the LP. McCartney sings the second "Any time at all" in each chorus because Lennon couldn't reach the notes. "Any Time at All" reprises a George Martin trick from "A Hard Day's Night" by using a piano solo echoed lightly note-for-note on guitar by George Harrison.

== Releases ==
In addition to A Hard Day's Night, "Any Time at All" was included on:

- Extracts from the Album A Hard Day's Night British EP.
- Capitol album Something New
- Rock 'n' Roll Music compilation LP
- The b-side for a 1964 Costa Rican single
- Extracts from the Album A Hard Day's Night sampler
- The U.S. Albums box set in 2014
- The soundtrack for the 2025 version of The Beatles Anthology

== Personnel ==
According to Ian MacDonald, except where noted:

- John Lennon – lead vocal, acoustic rhythm guitar, electric guitar (concluding chord)
- Paul McCartney – backing vocal, bass, piano
- George Harrison – 12-string lead guitar, classical guitar
- Ringo Starr – drums, cowbell

Additional musicians:

- George Martin: Piano solo
