= I Should Have Known Better =

1964 single by the Beatles

- US picture sleeve (reverse)

Single by the Beatles

from the album A Hard Day's Night
- A-side: "A Hard Day's Night"
- Released: 13 July 1964
- Recorded: 25–26 February 1964
- Studio: EMI, London
- Genre: Pop rock
- Length: 2:44
- Label: Capitol
- Songwriter: Lennon–McCartney
- Producer: George Martin

The Beatles US singles chronology
"Love Me Do" (1964)	"A Hard Day's Night" / "I Should Have Known Better" (1964)	"And I Love Her" (1964)

"I Should Have Known Better" is a song by English rock band the Beatles composed by John Lennon (credited to Lennon–McCartney) and originally issued on A Hard Day's Night, their soundtrack for the film of the same name released on 10 July 1964. "I Should Have Known Better" was also issued as the B-side of the US single "A Hard Day's Night" released on 13 July.

An orchestrated version of the song conducted by George Martin appears on the North American version of the album, A Hard Day's Night Original Motion Picture Soundtrack.

== Origin ==
"I Should Have Known Better" was one of several songs written and recorded specifically for the Beatles' debut movie, "A Hard Day's Night".

== Recording ==
The first recording session for the song was on 25 February 1964 (George Harrison's 21st birthday) at EMI Studios when three takes were attempted, but only one was complete. Take two was aborted when Lennon broke into hysterics over his harmonica playing. The song was re-recorded the next day after making some changes to the arrangement.

Lennon's harmonica playing opens the track, the last occasion the Beatles were to feature this instrument on an intro ("I'm a Loser", recorded 14 August 1964 has a harmonica solo). The song's middle sixteen section features George Harrison's new Rickenbacker 360/12 12-string guitar.

The mono and stereo versions have slightly different harmonica introductions. In the stereo version, the harmonica drops out briefly. Also, a noticeably clumsy and audible tape edit is heard during the second chorus between "You're gonna say you love me too, oh," and "And when I ask you to be mine."

== Releases ==
=== United Kingdom ===
In the UK, "I Should Have Known Better" was included on A Hard Day's Night, which was released on 10 July 1964. A single was not issued at that time, but in 1976, it was released as a B-side to "Yesterday". A cover version was issued by The Naturals, a group from Harlow, Essex, and reached No. 24 in the UK.

=== United States ===
In the US, "I Should Have Known Better" was released on 13 July 1964 as the B-side to "A Hard Day's Night" and reached number 53 in the Billboard Hot 100, and number 43 on the Cash Box chart.

As part of the film contract, United Artists acquired album rights for the American market. The company released a soundtrack album on 26 June 1964 with eight Beatles songs and four instrumentals. "I Should Have Known Better" was performed in the film, and it appears on the soundtrack. Capitol Records released Something New a month later with songs from the UK version of A Hard Day's Night that were not used in the film. The songs were also later released by Capitol on the Hey Jude compilation album in 1970.

=== Continental Europe ===
"I Should Have Known Better" was released as a single in a number of continental European countries, including Norway, where it reached number one, Italy where it spent a week at number 15, West Germany, where it reached number six, and Sweden, where it topped the Kvällstoppen Chart for four weeks.

== Charts ==
Weekly chart performance for "I Should Have Known Better"
Chart (1964–65)	Peak position
Belgium (Ultratop 50 Wallonia)	11
Chile (Billboard)	1
Italy (Musica e dischi)	18
Netherlands (Dutch Top 100)	1
Norway (VG-lista)	1
US Billboard Hot 100	53
West Germany (Media Control)	6

== Personnel ==
According to Ian MacDonald:

- John Lennon – double-tracked vocal, acoustic rhythm guitar, harmonica
- Paul McCartney – bass guitar
- George Harrison – twelve-string lead guitar
- Ringo Starr – drums

== On film ==
The song is performed in the train's brake coach scene of A Hard Day's Night. It was in fact filmed in a van, with crew members rocking the vehicle to simulate the action of a train in motion. Paul McCartney is seen lip-synching in the song, both in the train scene and in the live performance at the end of the film, despite not singing in the actual recording.
