= Something New (Beatles album) =

Studio album by the Beatles
- Released: 20 July 1964
- Recorded: 29 January – 4 June 1964
- Studios: EMI, London
- Genre: Rock and roll
- Length: 24:47 (mono); 24:27 (stereo)
- Label: Capitol
- Producer: George Martin

The Beatles North American chronology
A Hard Day's Night (1964)	Something New (1964)	Hear the Beatles Tell All (1964)

Singles from Something New
- 1. "And I Love Her" / "If I Fell" Released: 20 July 1964; 2. "I'll Cry Instead" / "I'm Happy Just to Dance with You" Released: 20 July 1964; 3. "Matchbox" / "Slow Down" Released: 24 August 1964

Something New is an album by the English rock band the Beatles, released in 1964 for the North American market only.

The album is the third Capitol LP release and fifth American album release overall by the band, following the United Artists release of A Hard Day's Night. The album includes eight songs from the original British release of A Hard Day's Night, as well as the tracks "Slow Down" and "Matchbox" from the Long Tall Sally EP and the German-language version of "I Want to Hold Your Hand". The mono version also featured the extended single mix of "I'll Cry Instead", while stereo editions included a shorter edit from the UK release of A Hard Day's Night.

== Release history ==
Originally scheduled for 1 August 1964, the album was rush-released on 20 July 1964, ten days after the British release of A Hard Day's Night. It was released in both mono and stereo versions. All mono mixes of the five songs duplicated from the United Artists soundtrack album are identical on both releases. Something New was the only early Capitol Beatles album to contain all tracks in true stereo. The mono release contains alternative versions of "Any Time At All" (a different mix during the instrumental bridge), "I'll Cry Instead" (with the "missing" third verse), "When I Get Home" (the line "Till I walk out that door again" during the song's bridge has a different vocal passage from the UK mono mix), "If I Fell" (Lennon's non-double-tracked introductory vocal), and "And I Love Her" (McCartney's non-double-tracked vocal).

This album was also released on the Parlophone label for sale only on American Armed Forces bases in Europe. These copies have great collector value. The album was also issued in Germany on the Odeon label. The German stereo version contains a reprocessed stereo version of "Komm, Gib Mir Deine Hand" and an extended version of "And I Love Her", repeating the closing riff six times instead of four. This mix was later released on the US version of Rarities.

In 2004, Something New was released for the first time on CD as part of The Capitol Albums, Volume 1 box set (catalogue number CDP 7243 8 66876 2 3) containing the US mixes for both mono and stereo. In 2014, the album was released on CD again, both individually, and included in the boxed set The U.S. Albums, which contained the album's running order but with UK mixes as remastered in 2009.

== Reception ==
Professional ratings
Review scores
Source	Rating
AllMusic	3.5/5 stars
The Encyclopedia of Popular Music	3/5 stars
The Rolling Stone Record Guide	5/5 stars

The album spent nine weeks at No. 2 on the Billboard Top LPs chart in 1964, behind the United Artists A Hard Day's Night album.

Something New was included in Robert Christgau's "Basic Record Library" of 1950s and 1960s recordings, published in Christgau's Record Guide: Rock Albums of the Seventies (1981).

== Track listing ==
All tracks written by John Lennon and Paul McCartney (Lennon–McCartney), except where noted.

Side one
No.	Title	Written by	Length
1.	"I'll Cry Instead"		2:09
2.	"Things We Said Today"		2:39
3.	"Any Time at All"		2:13
4.	"When I Get Home"		2:18
5.	"Slow Down"	Larry Williams	2:55
6.	"Matchbox"	Carl Perkins	1:58
Total length:			14:03

Side two
No.	Title	Written by	Length
1.	"Tell Me Why"		2:10
2.	"And I Love Her"		2:32
3.	"I'm Happy Just to Dance with You"		1:58
4.	"If I Fell"		2:22
5.	"Komm, Gib Mir Deine Hand"	Lennon–McCartney; Jean Nicolas; Heinz Hellmer	2:19
Total length:			11:21

Note: "I'll Cry Instead" mono version 2:09, stereo version 1:49.

== Personnel ==
According to Ian MacDonald:

The Beatles

- John Lennon – lead, harmony and backing vocals; electric and acoustic rhythm guitar, handclaps; piano ("Things We Said Today")
- Paul McCartney – lead, harmony and backing vocals; bass guitar, handclaps; piano ("Any Time At All")
- George Harrison – harmony and backing vocals; electric and acoustic lead guitar; lead vocals ("I'm Happy Just to Dance With You"); handclaps
- Ringo Starr – drums, handclaps; lead vocals ("Matchbox"); tambourine ("I'll Cry Instead"); bongos and claves ("And I Love Her"); African drum ("I'm Happy Just to Dance With You")

Additional musicians and production

- George Martin – production; piano ("Matchbox" and "Slow Down")
- Norman Smith – engineering

== Charts and certifications ==
In the U.S., the album sold 1,049,243 copies by 31 December 1964 and 1,443,735 copies by the end of the decade.

=== Chart performance ===
Chart (1964–65)	Peak position
US Billboard Top LPs	2
German Albums (Offizielle Top 100)	38

=== Certifications ===
Region	Certification	Certified units/sales
Canada (Music Canada)	Gold	50,000^{^}
United States (RIAA)	2× Platinum	2,000,000^{^}
^{^} Shipments figures based on certification alone.

== See also ==
- Outline of the Beatles
- The Beatles timeline

== Sources ==
- MacDonald, Ian (2007) [1994]. Revolution in the Head: The Beatles' Records and the Sixties (Third ed.). Chicago: Chicago Review Press. ISBN 978-1-55652-733-3.
- Stannard, Neville (1981). The Long and Winding Road: A History Of The Beatles On Record. London: Virgin Books Ltd. ISBN 0-907080-96-0.
- Whitburn, Joel (2010), Joel Whitburn Presents Top Pop Albums, Seventh Edition, Record Research Inc., ISBN 978-0-89820-183-3
