= I'll Be Back (song) =

1964 song by the Beatles

- Cover of the song's sheet music

Song by the Beatles

from the album A Hard Day's Night
- Released: 10 July 1964
- Recorded: 1 June 1964
- Studio: EMI, London
- Genre: Folk rock
- Length: 2:20
- Label: Parlophone
- Songwriter: Lennon–McCartney
- Producer: George Martin

"I'll Be Back" is a song written by John Lennon, with some collaboration from Paul McCartney (credited to Lennon–McCartney). It was recorded by the English rock band the Beatles for the soundtrack album to their film A Hard Day's Night (1964) but not used in the film. This song was not released in North America until Beatles '65, five months later.

== Structure ==
According to musicologist Ian MacDonald, Lennon created the song based on the chords of Del Shannon's "Runaway" a UK hit in April 1961. Author Bill Harry echoed this, noting that Lennon: "just reworked the chords of the Shannon number and came up with a completely different song".

With its poignant lyric and flamenco style acoustic guitars, "I'll Be Back" possesses a tragic air and is eccentric in structure. Unusually for a pop song, it shifts between major and minor keys, incorporates two distinct bridges, and lacks a traditional chorus. The fade-out ending also arrives unexpectedly, cutting off half a stanza early.

The metric structure also is unusual. The verse follows a six-measure phrase in 4/4 time. The first and third bridges consist of a four-measure phrase in 4/4, followed by a phrase with two measures of 4/4 and one of 2/4; the second bridge has a four-measure phrase followed by five measures of 4/4 and one of 2/4.

Producer George Martin preferred to open and close Beatles albums with strong material, explaining: "Another principle of mine when assembling an album was always to go out on a side strongly, placing the weaker material towards the end but then going out with a bang". However, Ian MacDonald observed that "I'll Be Back" took a different approach: "Fading away in tonal ambiguity at the end of A Hard Day's Night, it was a surprisingly downbeat farewell and a token of coming maturity".

Music journalist Robert Sandall later reflected on the song's significance in Mojo magazine, writing: "I'll Be Back" was the early Beatles at their most prophetic. This grasp of how to colour arrangements in darker or more muted tones foreshadowed an inner journey they eventually undertook in three albums' time, on Rubber Soul".

== Recording ==
The Beatles recorded "I'll Be Back" in 16 takes on 1 June 1964. The first nine were of the rhythm track, and the last seven were overdubs of the lead and harmony vocals, and an acoustic guitar overdub.

The Anthology 1 CD includes take two of "I'll Be Back", performed in 6/8 time. The recording broke down when Lennon fumbled over the words in the bridge, complaining on the take that "it's too hard to sing." The subsequent take, also included on Anthology, was performed in the 4/4 time used in the final take.

== Personnel ==
According to Walter Everett, except where noted:

- John Lennon – double-tracked vocal, acoustic guitar
- Paul McCartney – harmony vocal, bass guitar
- George Harrison – acoustic and lead nylon-string guitars
- Ringo Starr – drums

== Notable cover versions ==
- The Chicago-based band the Buckinghams released a version of this song in 1967 peaking #1 in the Philippines, according to Billboard magazine.
- Cliff Richard covered the song on his 1967 album Don't Stop Me Now!
- The Dutch band Golden Earring covered the song as "I'll Be Back Again" on their 1995 album Love Sweat.
- Shawn Colvin recorded a version of the song as a bonus track on her 2004 Polaroids: A Greatest Hits Collection album.
- Elliott Smith recorded a version of the track in 2003, however, it has not been officially released.
