= A Hard Day's Night (song) =

1964 single by The Beatles

- US picture sleeve

Single by the Beatles

from the album A Hard Day's Night
- B-side: "Things We Said Today" (UK); "I Should Have Known Better" (US)
- Released: 10 July 1964 (UK); 13 July 1964 (US)
- Recorded: 16 April 1964
- Studio: EMI, London
- Genre: Rock
- Length: 2:34
- Label: Parlophone (UK); Capitol (US)
- Songwriter: Lennon–McCartney
- Producer: George Martin

The Beatles UK singles chronology
"Ain't She Sweet" (1964)	"A Hard Day's Night" (1964)	"I Feel Fine" (1964)

The Beatles US singles chronology
"Ain't She Sweet" (1964)	"A Hard Day's Night" (1964)	"And I Love Her" (1964)

"A Hard Day's Night" is a song by the English rock band the Beatles. Credited to Lennon–McCartney, it was primarily written by John Lennon, with some minor collaboration from Paul McCartney. It was released on the soundtrack album A Hard Day's Night in 1964. It was also released as a single in the UK (with "Things We Said Today" as its B-side), and in the US (with "I Should Have Known Better" as its B-side).

The song featured prominently in the Beatles' first feature film, A Hard Day's Night (1964). The song topped the charts in both the United Kingdom and United States when it was released as a single. The American and British singles of "A Hard Day's Night", as well as both the American and British albums of the same title, held the top position in their respective charts simultaneously for a couple of weeks in August 1964, the first time any artist had accomplished this feat.

== Title ==
The song's title originated from something said by Ringo Starr, the Beatles' drummer. Starr described it this way in an interview with disc jockey Dave Hull in 1964: "We went to do a job, and we'd worked all day and we happened to work all night. I came up still thinking it was day I suppose, and I said, 'It's been a hard day ...' and I looked around and saw it was dark so I said, '... night!' So we came to 'A Hard Day's Night.'"

Starr's statement was the inspiration for the title of the film, which in turn inspired the composition of the song. According to Lennon in a 1980 interview with Playboy magazine: "I was going home in the car and Dick Lester [director of the movie] suggested the title, 'Hard Day's Night' from something Ringo had said. I had used it in In His Own Write [a book Lennon was writing then], but it was an off-the-cuff remark by Ringo. You know, one of those malapropisms. A Ringo-ism, where he said it not to be funny ... just said it. So Dick Lester said, 'We are going to use that title.'"

In a 1994 interview for The Beatles Anthology, however, McCartney disagreed with Lennon's recollections, basically stating that it was the Beatles, and not Lester, who had come up with the idea of using Starr's verbal misstep: "The title was Ringo's. We'd almost finished making the film, and this fun bit arrived that we'd not known about before, which was naming the film. So we were sitting around at Twickenham studios having a little brain-storming session ... and we said, 'Well, there was something Ringo said the other day.' Ringo would do these little malapropisms, he would say things slightly wrong, like people do, but his were always wonderful, very lyrical ... they were sort of magic even though he was just getting it wrong. And he said after a concert, 'Phew, it's been a hard day's night.'"

In 1996, yet another version of events cropped up. In an Associated Press report, the producer of the film A Hard Day's Night, Walter Shenson, stated that Lennon described to Shenson some of Starr's funnier gaffes, including "a hard day's night", whereupon Shenson immediately decided that that was going to be the title of the movie (replacing other alternatives, including Beatlemania). Shenson then told Lennon that he needed a theme song for the film.

== Composition ==
Lennon dashed off the song in one night, and brought it in for comments the following morning. As he described in his 1980 Playboy interview, "the next morning I brought in the song ... 'cuz there was a little competition between Paul and I as to who got the A-side – who got the hits. If you notice, in the early days the majority of singles, in the movies and everything, were mine ... in the early period I'm dominating the group ... The reason Paul sang on 'A Hard Day's Night' (in the bridge) is because I couldn't reach the notes." However, McCartney and others remember McCartney collaborating with Lennon.

On 16 April 1964, the Beatles gathered at Studio 2 of the EMI Studios and recorded "A Hard Day's Night". It took them less than three hours to polish the song for its final release, eventually selecting the ninth take as the one to be released. Evening Standard journalist Maureen Cleave described a memorable taxi ride the morning the song was recorded:

One day I picked John up in a taxi and took him to Abbey Road for a recording session. The tune to the song 'A Hard Day's Night' was in his head, the words scrawled on a birthday card from a fan to his little son Julian: 'When I get home to you,' it said, 'I find my tiredness is through ...' Rather a feeble line about tiredness, I said. 'OK,' he said cheerfully and, borrowing my pen, instantly changed it to the slightly suggestive: 'When I get home to you/I find the things that you do/Will make me feel all right.' The other Beatles were there in the studio and, of course, the wonderful George Martin. John sort of hummed the tune to the others – they had no copies of the words or anything else. Three hours later I was none the wiser about how they’d done it but the record was made – and you can see the birthday card in the British Library.

In the Associated Press report, Shenson described his recollection of what happened. At 8:30 in the morning, "There were John and Paul with guitars at the ready and all the lyrics scribbled on matchbook covers. They played it and the next night recorded it." Shenson declared, "It had the right beat and the arrangement was brilliant. These guys were geniuses."

== Opening chord ==
Opening chord

Possible chord options

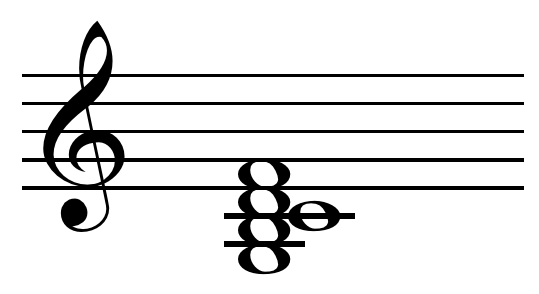
G7sus4

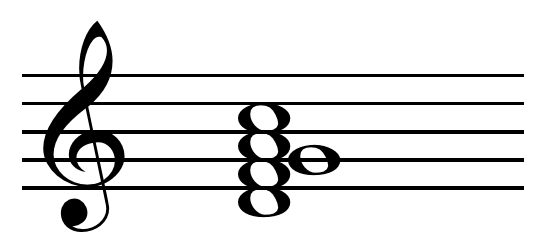
Dm7sus4

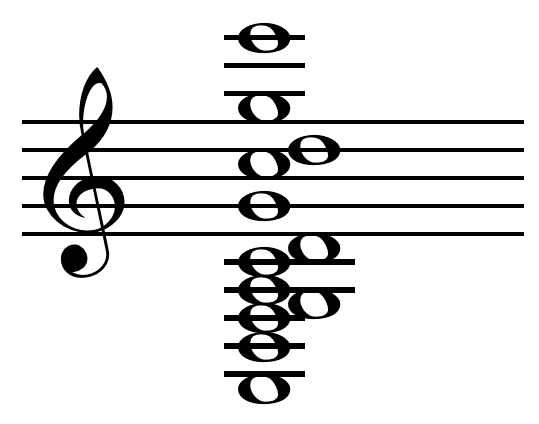
Jason Brown's analysis, as published in his 2008 report "Mathematics, Physics and 'A Hard Day's Night'"

Fadd9

"A Hard Day's Night" is widely known for its iconic Rickenbacker 360/12 12-string guitar's "mighty opening chord" played by George Harrison. According to George Martin, "We knew it would open both the film and the soundtrack LP, so we wanted a particularly strong and effective beginning. The strident guitar chord was the perfect launch," having what Ian MacDonald called "a significance in Beatles lore matched only by the concluding E major of 'A Day in the Life', the two opening and closing the group's middle period of peak creativity".

According to musicologist Jeremy Summerly, "the sound of this chord is the most discussed pop opening of all time". Analysis of the chord has been much debated, it having been described as G7add9sus4, G7sus4, or G11sus4 and others below. It is most simply described as F6/9 in third inversion, or F6/9/D.

Part of the chord is an Fadd9 as confirmed by Harrison during an online chat on 15 February 2001:

Q: Mr Harrison, what is the opening chord you used for "A Hard Day's Night"?
A: It is F with a G on top, but you'll have to ask Paul about the bass note to get the proper story.

According to Walter Everett the opening chord has an introductory dominant function because McCartney plays D in the bass: Harrison and Martin play F A C G, over the bass D, on twelve-string guitar and piano respectively, giving the chord a mixture-coloured neighbour, F; two diatonic neighbours, A and C; plus an anticipation of the tonic, G – the major subtonic as played on guitar being a borrowed chord commonly used by the Beatles, first in "P.S. I Love You" (see mode mixture), and later in "Every Little Thing", "Tomorrow Never Knows" and "Got to Get You into My Life" (in the latter two against a tonic pedal).

Alan W. Pollack also interprets the chord as a surrogate dominant, the G being an anticipation that resolves on the G major chord that opens the verse. He suggests it is a mixture of D minor, F major, and G major (missing the B). Tony Bacon calls it a Dm7sus4 (D F G A C), which is the minor seventh chord (plus the fourth, G) (for more information regarding chord functions see diatonic function).

Everett points out that the chord relates to the Beatles' interest in pandiatonic harmony.

Dominic Pedler has also provided an interpretation of the chord, with the Beatles and George Martin playing the following:

- George Harrison: Fadd9 in 1st position on Rickenbacker 360/12 12-string electric guitar
- John Lennon: Fadd9 in 1st position on a Gibson J-160E 6-string acoustic guitar
- Paul McCartney: high D3 played on the D-string, 12th fret on Hofner 500/1 electric bass
- George Martin: D2-G2-D3 played on a Steinway Grand Piano
- Ringo Starr: subtle snare drum and ride cymbal

This gives the notes: G-B-D-F-A-C (the B is a harmonic). One of the interesting things about this chord (as described by Pedler) is how McCartney's high bass note reverberates inside the soundbox of Lennon's acoustic guitar and begins to be picked up on Lennon's microphone or pick-up during the sounding of the chord. This gives the chord its special "wavy" and unstable quality. Pedler describes the effect as a "virtual pull-off".

In 2004, Jason Brown, a mathematics professor at Dalhousie University, published a report titled "Mathematics, Physics and 'A Hard Day's Night'", in which he analysed the properties of the song's opening chord using Fourier transforms. He concluded that Martin's piano contribution provided the important element in the chord beside Harrison's playing. In November the following year, Wired published an article on Brown's use of Celemony's Melodyne Editor with Direct Note Access technology to further analyse the chord. Brown's findings were partly challenged in 2012 by another mathematician, Kevin Houston from the University of Leeds. Houston, who also used a Fourier transform, attributed a greater importance in Lennon's contribution on acoustic guitar, rather than the piano notes played by Martin.

Harrison played a repeated guitar arpeggio, outlining the notes he contributed to the opening chord, thereby ending the song in a circular fashion. Martin said that the ending was his idea: "Again, that's film writing. I was stressing to them the importance of making the song fit, not actually finishing it but dangling on so that you're into the next mood." The song contains 12 other chords.

== Music ==
"A Hard Day's Night"

The song is composed in the key of G major and in a 4/4 time signature. The verse features the ♭VII or major subtonic chord that was a part of the opening chord as an ornament or embellishment below the tonic. Transposed down a perfect fifth, the modal frame of the song though pentatonic features a ladder of thirds axially centred on G with a ceiling note of B♭ and floor note of E♭ (the low C being a passing tone).

According to Middleton, the song, "at first glance major-key-with-modal-touches", reveals through its "Line of Latent Mode" "a deep kinship with typical blues melodic structures: it is centred on three of the notes of the minor-pentatonic mode (E♭-G-B♭), with the contradictory major seventh (B♮) set against that. Moreover, the shape assumed by these notes – the modal frame – as well as the abstract scale they represent, is revealed, too; and this – an initial, repeated circling round the dominant (G), with an excursion to its minor third (B♭), 'answered' by a fall to the 'symmetrical' minor third of the tonic (E♭) – is a common pattern in blues."

Lennon opens the twelve-measure-long verse and carries it along, suddenly joined at the end by McCartney, who then sings the bridge.

=== Recording ===
During the recording of "A Hard Day's Night", Lennon and McCartney doubletracked their vocals throughout including the chorus. Lennon sings the lead vocal on the verses and Paul sings lead on the middle eight. During the chorus, McCartney handles the high harmony and Lennon the low harmony. Take 7 reveals that the lyrics were still not set with Lennon singing "you make me feel all right" and McCartney and Harrison still unsteady with their respective lines, ending with Lennon chiding them with the line "I heard a funny chord".

The instrumental break is played by Harrison on a Rickenbacker 12-string guitar, with Martin and McCartney doubling on piano and bass, respectively, recorded to tape at half-speed and then sped up to normal. Recording this solo was the most time-consuming aspect of the session. A take that appeared on a bootleg in the 1980s shows Harrison making errors in his playing. In the description of Rolling Stone's editors: "But by the time the session ended at 10 that night, he had sculpted one of his most memorable solos – an upward run played twice and capped with a circular flourish, with the church-bell chime of his guitar echoed on piano by Martin."

The song closes with Harrison playing an arpeggio of his contribution (Fadd9) to the opening chord during the fade-out.

=== Lyrics ===
The lyrics speak about the singer's devotion to his lover, and how he works so she can buy the things she wants. The singer sings about his tiredness when he comes home from work, but how the things that his lover does perk him up.

== Release and reception ==
"A Hard Day's Night" was first released to the United States, coming out on 26 June 1964 on the album A Hard Day's Night, the soundtrack to the film, and released by United Artists. It was the first song to be released before single release (see below).

The United Kingdom first heard "A Hard Day's Night" when it was released there on 10 July 1964, both on the album A Hard Day's Night, and as a single, backed with "Things We Said Today" on the B-side. Both the album and single were released by Parlophone Records. The single began charting on 18 July 1964, a week later ousting the Rolling Stones' "It's All Over Now" from the top spot on the British charts on 25 July 1964, coincidentally the day when both the American and British albums too hit the peak of their respective charts. The single stayed on top for three weeks, and lasted another nine weeks in the charts afterwards.

The American single on 1 August started a two-week-long run at the top, setting a new record – nobody before had ever held the number one position on both the album and singles charts in the United Kingdom and the United States at the same time. The Beatles were the only ones who had done this until 1970 when Simon and Garfunkel achieved the same feat with their album Bridge over Troubled Water and its title track.

The song was the fifth of seven songs by the Beatles to hit number 1 in a one-year period, an all-time record on the US charts. In order, these were "I Want to Hold Your Hand", "She Loves You", "Can't Buy Me Love", "Love Me Do", "A Hard Day's Night", "I Feel Fine" and "Eight Days a Week". It was also the sixth of seven songs written by Lennon-McCartney to hit number 1 in 1964, an all-time record on the US charts for writing the most songs to hit number 1 in the same calendar year (see List of Billboard Hot 100 chart achievements and milestones).

The song's opening chord and closing arpeggios were highly influential on the Byrds. After watching the film A Hard Day's Night and seeing Harrison's choice of guitar, Roger McGuinn adopted the Rickenbacker as his and the Byrds' signature instrument. In this way, according to author Andrew Grant Jackson, "A Hard Day's Night" "birthed" the folk-rock sound that the Byrds popularised in 1965. That same year, "A Hard Day's Night" won the Grammy Award for Best Performance by a Vocal Group. In 2004, Rolling Stone magazine ranked the song at number 153 on its list of the 500 Greatest Songs of All Time.

== Personnel ==
According to Ian MacDonald:

- John Lennon – double-tracked vocals (verses), acoustic rhythm guitar
- Paul McCartney – double-tracked vocals (middle-eight), harmony vocal, bass
- George Harrison – lead electric twelve-string guitar
- Ringo Starr – drums, bongos, cowbell
- George Martin – piano, producer

== In popular culture ==
- "A Hard Day's Night" was used as wake-up music on Space Shuttle Missions STS-30, STS-61, and STS-69.
- The song was played to conclude the Channel Four breakfast programme The Channel Four Daily in 1992.
- The song was featured in the anime series Jewelpet Sunshine, as an insert song in episode 25.

== Live renditions ==
The Beatles regularly played the song live throughout 1964 and 1965.

During his 2016 One on One tour, Paul McCartney played the song for the first time as a solo artist and for the first time by a Beatle in half a century. The Beatles had played it for the last time on 31 August 1965 at the Cow Palace in Daly City, California.

== Cover versions ==
Many artists have covered the song. Peter Sellers made a comedy version in which he recited the lyrics in the style of Laurence Olivier in the film Richard III. Sellers' recording was a UK Top 20 hit in 1965. A version by jazz pianist Ramsey Lewis reached number 11 in Canada in February 1966.

== Charts ==
=== Weekly charts ===
Chart (1964)	Peak position
Australian Kent Music Report	1
Belgium (Ultratop 50 Flanders)	4
Canada Top Singles (RPM)	1
Finland (The Official Finnish Charts)	1
German Media Control Singles Chart	2
Ireland (IRMA)	1
Netherlands (Single Top 100)	1
New Zealand (Lever Hit Parade)	1
Norway (VG-lista)	1
South Africa (Springbok)	1
Sweden (Kvällstoppen)	1
Sweden (Tio i Topp)	1
UK Singles (Official Charts)	1
US Billboard Hot 100	1
US Cash Box Top 100	1
US Record World 100 Top Pops	1

Chart (1986–1987)	Peak position
Canada (RPM) Top Singles	87

Chart (2015)	Peak position
Sweden Heatseeker (Sverigetopplistan)	20

=== Year-end charts ===
Chart (1964)	Rank
South Africa	14
UK	5
US Billboard Hot 100	13
US Cash Box Top 100	18

== Certifications ==
Region	Certification	Certified units/sales
New Zealand (RMNZ)	Gold	15,000^{‡}
United Kingdom (BPI)	Silver	200,000^{‡}
United States (RIAA)	Gold	1,000,000^{^}
^{^} Shipments figures based on certification alone.^{‡} Sales+streaming figures based on certification alone.
