= Slow Down (Larry Williams song) =

1958 single by Larry Williams

- US picture sleeve

Single by Larry Williams
- A-side: "Dizzy, Miss Lizzy"
- Released: March 1958
- Recorded: September 11, 1957
- Studio: Masters Records, Hollywood, California
- Genre: Rock and roll
- Length: 2:40
- Label: Specialty
- Songwriter: Larry Williams

Larry Williams singles chronology
"Bony Moronie" (1957)	"Slow Down" (1958)	"Hootchy-Koo" / "The Dummy" (1958)

"Slow Down" is a rock and roll song written and performed by Larry Williams. Recorded in 1957, AllMusic writer Stewart Mason describes it as "raucous enough to be punk rock nearly a full two decades before the concept was even in existence." Specialty Records released it as a single in 1958, but only the second-side "Dizzy, Miss Lizzy" reached the record charts. Both songs were later covered by the Beatles.

== Recording ==
Williams recorded the song at Master Recorders, Hollywood, California, on September 11, 1957. Music journalist Gene Sculatti describes the instrumentation provided by the back-up musicians as "unstoppable, nongimmicky, almost careening out of control with its pounding piano and booting sax, 'Slow Down' is arguably Williams's hippest track". The personnel includes:

- Larry Williams – vocal, piano
- Jewell Grant – baritone sax
- Plas Johnson – tenor sax
- René Hall – guitar
- Ted Brinson – bass
- Earl Palmer – drums

== The Beatles rendition ==
"Slow Down"
- US picture sleeve (reverse)

Single by the Beatles

from the EP Long Tall Sally and the album Something New
- A-side: "Matchbox"
- Released: June 19, 1964 (UK Long Tall Sally EP); August 24, 1964 (US single)
- Recorded: June 1 & 4, 1964
- Studio: EMI 2, London
- Genre: Rock and roll
- Length: 2:54
- Label: Parlophone (UK); Capitol (US)
- Songwriter: Larry Williams
- Producer: George Martin

The Beatles US singles chronology
"I'll Cry Instead" (1964)	"Matchbox" / "Slow Down" (1964)	"I Feel Fine" (1964)

On June 1, 1964, the Beatles recorded most of their version of "Slow Down" at EMI Studio 2 in London. Producer George Martin added piano overdubs three days later. Parlophone released the song on the Long Tall Sally EP in June in the UK. In July, the song was included on the American album Something New. Capitol Records also released it as a single, with "Matchbox" (also from the Long Tall Sally EP) as the A-side, on August 24, 1964.

"Slow Down" reached number 25 on the Billboard Hot 100 singles chart. The song is also included on the 1988 Past Masters compilation. A performance specifically recorded for broadcast by the BBC is found on the album Live at the BBC (1994).

In his book Revolution in the Head, Ian MacDonald criticizes the performance as "one of the Beatles' least successful rock-and-roll covers", lacking "bottom, drive and basic cohesion" and states that "The guitar solo is embarrassing and the sound balance a shambles". He also points out the edit at 1:14 where the piano momentarily disappears and McCartney's bass becomes inaudible. According to MacDonald, the personnel includes:

- John Lennon – vocal, lead guitar
- Paul McCartney – bass guitar
- George Harrison – rhythm guitar
- Ringo Starr – drums
- George Martin – piano

However, author John C. Winn states that Harrison played the lead guitar on the track. Musicologist Walter Everett also lists Harrison as the lead guitarist, and says he played his parts on a Gretsch Country Gentleman.

=== Charts ===
Chart performance for "Slow Down"
Chart (1964)	Peak position
US Billboard Hot 100	25
