= Matchbox (song) =

Original song written and composed by Carl Perkins

Single by Carl Perkins

from the album Dance Album of Carl Perkins
- A-side: "Your True Love"
- Released: 1957
- Recorded: 1956
- Studio: Memphis Recording Service, Memphis, Tennessee
- Genre: Rockabilly
- Length: 2:10
- Label: Sun
- Songwriter: Carl Perkins
- Producer: Sam Phillips

"Matchbox" is a song written and recorded by Carl Perkins and released in 1957. Blind Lemon Jefferson wrote and recorded a song entitled "Match Box Blues" in 1927, which is musically different but which contains some lyric phrases in common.

"Matchbox" was recorded as a rockabilly song by Carl Perkins in December 1956 and by fellow Sun Records performer, Jerry Lee Lewis – who played piano on the original track – in 1958. Sam Phillips and Sun Records released the Carl Perkins version as the B-side to "Your True Love". Although only the A-side became a record chart hit in 1957, "Matchbox" is one of Perkins' best-known recordings, and various musicians have recorded the tune.

== Background ==
Ma Rainey recorded "Lost Wandering Blues" in Chicago in March 1924. Paramount Records issued it on the standard ten-inch 78 rpm single (no. 12098). Her lyrics include the matchbox as a suitcase reference:

I'm leaving this morning, with my clothes in my hand
I won't stop to wandering, till I find my man
I'm sitting here wondering', will a matchbox hold my clothes
I've got a sun to beat, I'll be farther down the road

Three years later, Blind Lemon Jefferson used it for the title of his recording "Match Box Blues" on March 14, 1927, for Okeh Records in Atlanta, Georgia. Blues author Paul Oliver stated that both Rainey and Jefferson "may have absorbed [the line] from traditional usage".

Jefferson recorded the song twice more in April 1927 for Paramount Records. Although they contain some differences, they include

I'm sittin' here wonderin', will a matchbox hold my clothes (2×)
I ain't got no matches but I still got a long way to go.

Subsequently, the song was recorded by several blues and country swing musicians, such as Lead Belly, Big Bill Broonzy, the Shelton Brothers, and Roy Newman and His Boys.

== Perkins recording ==
1957 U.S. sheet music for "Matchbox"

After recording "Your True Love" at Sun Records studio, Carl Perkins' father, Buck suggested that he write a song based on snatches of lyrics that he remembered. Buck knew only a few lines from the 1927 song from the recordings by Jefferson or the Shelton Brothers. As Perkins sang the few words his father had suggested, Jerry Lee Lewis, who was at that time a session piano player at Sun Studios, started a boogie-woogie riff. Perkins began to improvise on his guitar and with lyrics. The Sun recording on December 4, 1956 was produced by Sam Phillips at Sun Studios in Memphis.

Perkins maintained that he had never heard Jefferson's song when he recorded "Matchbox". The songs are musically, thematically, and lyrically totally different. Jefferson's song is about a mean-spirited woman; Perkins' is about a lovelorn "poor boy" with limited prospects. The song was published and copyrighted in 1957 in the US with words and music by Carl Lee Perkins by Knox Music/Hill and Range Songs of New York.

The "Matchbox" recording session is historically significant as a milestone in rock and roll history because later that day, Elvis Presley, Johnny Cash, and Lewis were all in the Sun Studio with Sam Phillips with Carl Perkins and his band. The impromptu group formed at this jam session became known as the Million Dollar Quartet.

Carl Perkins performed the song on ABC-TV's Ozark Jubilee on February 2, 1957. Perkins and his band also performed the song on the syndicated TV show Ranch Party hosted by Tex Ritter in 1957. There was also a promo ad for the release of the Sun single in Billboard magazine.

Additionally, Johnny Cash and Bob Dylan recorded a version with Carl Perkins at Columbia Studio A during sessions held on February 17 and 18, 1969. This recording was later featured on The Bootleg Series Vol. 15: Travelin' Thru, 1967–1969.

== The Beatles' rendition ==
"Matchbox"
- US picture sleeve

Single by the Beatles

from the EP Long Tall Sally and the album Something New
- B-side: "Slow Down"
- Released: June 19, 1964 (UK EP); August 24, 1964 (US single)
- Recorded: June 1, 1964
- Genre: Rockabilly
- Length: 1:57 (misprinted as 1:37 on both singles and albums)
- Label: Parlophone (UK); Capitol (US)
- Songwriter: Carl Perkins
- Producer: George Martin

The Beatles US singles chronology
"I'll Cry Instead" (1964)	"Matchbox" (1964)	"I Feel Fine" (1964)

The Beatles were fans of Perkins and performed "Matchbox" during their shows in 1961 and 1962. The song served as the vocal spot for their drummer, Pete Best, until his sacking in August 1962, at which point John Lennon took over as lead singer. A live version from December that year was included on the 1977 album Live! at the Star-Club in Hamburg, Germany; 1962. In July 1963, the Beatles performed "Matchbox" with Ringo Starr, Best's replacement, on lead vocals for their BBC radio show Pop Go the Beatles. This version was included on the 1994 compilation Live at the BBC.

Starr also sang lead vocals when the band recorded the song for their Long Tall Sally EP in 1964. Perkins was visiting London and was invited to observe the session on June 1. Starr later recalled feeling "very embarrassed" because he had a bad throat; two days later, he was hospitalized with acute tonsillitis and pharyngitis, resulting in him missing the start of the Beatles' world tour. The band were supplemented on the recording by producer George Martin, who played piano. In his commentary on the track, author Ian MacDonald dismisses the Beatles' performance as "flat-footed", adding that, as a keen student of Perkins' guitar playing, only George Harrison demonstrates "any motivation" in his contribution.

"Matchbox" was released in the UK on June 19 as the final track on Long Tall Sally. In the US, it instead appeared on the Capitol Records album Something New in July, before being issued on a single, backed by "Slow Down", on August 24. "Matchbox" peaked at number 17 on three record charts: in the U.S., on the Billboard Hot 100 and Cash Box, and, in Canada, on the national RPM Top 40 chart. The song was subsequently included on the Beatles compilation albums Rock 'n' Roll Music, Past Masters and Mono Masters.

Take 1 of the Beatles' recording appears on the 2025 Anthology 4, which is part of the Anthology series.

=== Musicians ===
- Ringo Starr – drums and lead vocals
- John Lennon – rhythm guitar
- Paul McCartney – bass guitar
- George Harrison – lead guitar

Additional musicians

- George Martin – piano

=== Charts ===
Chart performance for "Matchbox"
Chart (1964)	Peak position
US Billboard Hot 100	17
