= Can't Buy Me Love =

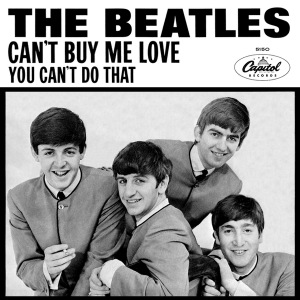
- US picture sleeve

Single by the Beatles

from the album A Hard Day's Night
- B-side: "You Can't Do That"
- Released: 16 March 1964 (US); 20 March 1964 (UK)
- Recorded: 29 January, 25 February 1964
- Studio: Pathé Marconi, Paris; EMI, London
- Genre: Rock and roll; pop rock; R&B
- Length: 2:11
- Label: Parlophone (UK), Capitol (US)
- Songwriter: Lennon–McCartney
- Producer: George Martin

The Beatles UK singles chronology
"I Want to Hold Your Hand" (1963)	"Can't Buy Me Love" (1964)	"Ain't She Sweet" (1964)

The Beatles US singles chronology
"Twist and Shout" (1964)	"Can't Buy Me Love" (1964)	"Do You Want to Know a Secret" (1964)

"Can't Buy Me Love" is a song by the English rock band the Beatles that was released in March 1964 as the A-side of their sixth single. It was written by Paul McCartney and credited to the Lennon–McCartney partnership. The song was included on the group's album A Hard Day's Night and was featured in a scene in Richard Lester's film of the same title. The single topped charts in the United Kingdom, the United States, Australia, Ireland, New Zealand, South Africa, the Netherlands, France and Sweden. In the UK, it was the fourth highest selling single of the 1960s.

== Composition ==
"Can't Buy Me Love" sample

While in Paris, the Beatles stayed at the five-star George V hotel and had an upright piano moved into one of their suites so that songwriting could continue. It was here that McCartney wrote "Can't Buy Me Love". The song was written under the pressure of the success achieved by "I Want to Hold Your Hand", which had just reached number one in America. When producer George Martin first heard "Can't Buy Me Love", he felt that the song needed changing: "I thought that we really needed a tag for the song's ending, and a tag for the beginning; a kind of intro. So I took the first two lines of the chorus and changed the ending, and said 'Let's just have these lines, and by altering the second phrase we can get back into the verse pretty quickly.'" And they said: "That's not a bad idea, we'll do it that way". The song's verse is a twelve-bar blues in structure, a formula that the Beatles seldom applied to their own material.

When pressed by American journalists in 1966 to reveal the song's "true" meaning, McCartney stated: "I think you can put any interpretation you want on anything, but when someone suggests that 'Can't Buy Me Love' is about a prostitute, I draw the line." He went on to say: "The idea behind it was that all these material possessions are all very well, but they won't buy me what I really want." However, he was to comment later: "It should have been 'Can Buy Me Love'" when reflecting on the perks that money and fame had brought him.

== Recording ==
"Can't Buy Me Love" was recorded on 29 January 1964 at EMI's Pathe Marconi Studios in Paris, France where the Beatles were performing 18 days of concerts at the Olympia Theatre. At this time, EMI's West Germany branch, Odeon, insisted that the Beatles would not sell records in any significant numbers in Germany unless they were actually sung in the German language and the Beatles reluctantly agreed to re-record the vocals to "She Loves You" and "I Want to Hold Your Hand" prior to them being released in Germany. George Martin travelled to Paris with a newly mastered rhythm track for what was to be "Komm, Gib Mir Deine Hand". "Sie Liebt Dich" required the Beatles to record a new rhythm track as the original two-track recording had been scrapped. EMI sent a translator to be present for this recording session which had been hurriedly arranged to tie in with the Beatles' Paris commitments. This was accomplished well within the allotted studio time, allowing the Beatles an opportunity to record the backing track, with a guide vocal, to the recently composed "Can't Buy Me Love". At this stage the song included background vocal harmonies, but after listening to the first take, the band concluded that the song did not need them. Therefore, "Can't Buy Me Love" became the first single the Beatles released without their characteristic background harmonies.

McCartney's final vocal was overdubbed at EMI Studios, Abbey Road, London, on 25 February. Also re-recorded on this day at EMI Studios was George Harrison's modified guitar solo, although his original solo can still just be heard in the background. Harrison said: "What happened was, we recorded first in Paris and re-recorded in England. Obviously they'd tried to overdub it, but in those days they only had two tracks, so you can hear the version we put on in London, and in the background you can hear a quieter one." Helen Shapiro, a friend of the Beatles and present at this overdub session, says that Ringo Starr also added extra cymbals "over the top" and that "apparently this was something he did quite often on their records". "Can't Buy Me Love" is also the only English-language track that the Beatles recorded in a studio outside the UK, although the instrumentation of the band's 1968 B-side "The Inner Light" was recorded in India by Harrison and some Indian classical musicians.

== Release ==
"Can't Buy Me Love" was released as a single, backed by John Lennon's song "You Can't Do That". The release took place on 16 March 1964 in the United States and four days later in the United Kingdom. In the US, "Can't Buy Me Love" topped the Billboard Hot 100 chart for five weeks. With the success of the song, the Beatles established four records on the Hot 100:

1. Until Billboard began using SoundScan for their charts in 1991, the song had the biggest jump to the top position: number 27 to number 1.
2. It gave the Beatles three consecutive chart-topping singles, since "I Want to Hold Your Hand" was replaced at number 1 by "She Loves You", which was in turn replaced by "Can't Buy Me Love". The three songs spent a combined total of 14 consecutive weeks at number 1. This is the only time an artist had three number 1 singles in a row.
3. When "Can't Buy Me Love" reached number 1, on 4 April 1964, the Beatles held the entire top five on the Hot 100, the next positions being filled by "Twist and Shout", "She Loves You", "I Want to Hold Your Hand" and "Please Please Me", respectively. No other act had held the top five spots simultaneously, a record not broken until 2021.
4. During its second week at number 1, the Beatles had fourteen songs on the Hot 100 at the same time.

In the UK, "Can't Buy Me Love" became the Beatles' fourth number 1 and their third single to sell over a million copies. By November 2012, it had sold 1.53 million copies there. As of December 2018, it was the 35th best-selling single of all time in the UK – one of six Beatles songs included on the top sales rankings published by the Official Charts Company.

A stereo mix of "Can't Buy Me Love" was first carried out in late June 1964 for inclusion on the Beatles' A Hard Day's Night album. For its sequence in the film A Hard Day's Night, director Richard Lester used crane shots to capture the four band members running and leaping in a sports field. In his book on the history of music videos, Money for Nothing, author Saul Austerlitz places "Can't Buy Me Love" at number 33 on the "Top 100 Videos List".

Subsequent album appearances for the song include the compilations Hey Jude (1970; also known as The Beatles Again), the 1973 double-disc collection 1962–1966, the 1982 release Reel Music, which features songs from the Beatles' feature films; the 1982 compilation 20 Greatest Hits and the 2000 greatest hits album 1; a composite of takes one and two of "Can't Buy Me Love" was included on the Anthology 1 compilation in 1995. Rolling Stone ranked "Can't Buy Me Love" at number 295 on its list of the 500 Greatest Songs of All Time in 2010.

In September 2015, the Beatles donated the use of their recording of the song to People for the Ethical Treatment of Animals for a television commercial.

McCartney opened his 2022 "Got Back" Tour gigs with the song.

== Cover versions ==
Ella Fitzgerald recorded the song for her 1964 album Hello, Dolly! This version was also released as a single, peaking at number 34 in the UK in June 1964, spending five weeks on the chart. Alex Petridis of The Guardian cites Fitzgerald as an example of how several artists, responding to the composition's swing-like rhythmic quality, issued "parent-friendly jazz covers" of "Can't Buy Me Love", and how the song was "key to establishing the Beatles' cross-generational appeal".

R&B group Blackstreet recorded a slower-tempo cover of the song for their 1996 album Another Level.

== Personnel ==
According to Ian MacDonald:

- Paul McCartney – double-tracked vocals, bass
- John Lennon – acoustic rhythm guitar
- George Harrison – double-tracked lead guitar, twelve-string guitar
- Ringo Starr – drums

=== Additional personnel ===
- Norman Smith – hi-hat overdub

== Charts ==
=== Weekly charts ===
Chart (1964)	Peak position
Australian (Kent Music Report)	1
Belgium (Ultratop 50 Flanders)	5
Denmark (Salgshitlisterne Top 20)	1
Ireland (IRMA)	1
Finland (The Official Finnish Charts)	3
Netherlands (Single Top 100)	1
New Zealand (Lever Hit Parade)	1
Norway (VG-lista)	3
Sweden (Kvällstoppen)	1
Sweden (Tio i Topp)	1
UK Singles (Official Charts)	1
US Billboard Hot 100	1
US Cash Box Top 100	1
West German Media Control Singles Chart	24

Chart (2015)	Peak position
Sweden Heatseeker (Sverigetopplistan)	16

=== Year-end charts ===
Chart (1964)	Rank
UK Singles (Official Charts Company)	1
US Billboard Hot 100	52
US Cash Box Top 100	68

== Certifications and sales ==
Certifications and sales for Can't Buy Me Love
Region	Certification	Certified units/sales
United Kingdom (BPI)	Silver	1,547,454
United States (RIAA)	Gold	2,100,000
Summaries
Worldwide	—	6,000,000

== Sources ==
- Austerlitz, Saul (2007). Money for Nothing: A History of the Music Video from the Beatles to the White Stripes. New York, NY: Continuum. ISBN 978-0-8264-1818-0.
- Badman, Keith (2000). The Beatles Off The Record.
- The Beatles (2000). The Beatles Anthology. San Francisco, CA: Chronicle Books. ISBN 0-8118-2684-8.
- Blake, Andrew (1999). Living through pop.
- Lewisohn, Mark (1988). The Beatles Recording Sessions. New York: Harmony Books. ISBN 0-517-57066-1.
- MacDonald, Ian (2005). Revolution in the Head: The Beatles' Records and the Sixties (Second Revised ed.). London: Pimlico (Rand). ISBN 1-84413-828-3.
- Martin, George; Pearson, William (1994). Summer of Love: The Making of Sgt Pepper. London: Macmillan. ISBN 0-333-60398-2.
- Miles, Barry (1997). Paul McCartney: Many Years From Now. New York: Henry Holt and Company. ISBN 0-8050-5249-6.
- "American single certifications – Beatles, The – Can_t Buy Me Love". Recording Industry Association of America.
- Southall, Brian (1982). Abbey Road. The Story of the World's Most Famous Recording Studios. London: Patrick Stephens. ISBN 0-85059-810-9.
- "Can't Buy Me Love – The Beatles Bible". 15 March 2008.
