= I'll Cry Instead =

- US picture sleeve

Single by the Beatles

from the album A Hard Day's Night
- B-side: "I'm Happy Just to Dance with You"
- Released: 10 July 1964 (UK A Hard Day's Night album); 20 July 1964 (US single)
- Recorded: 1 June 1964
- Studio: EMI, London
- Genre: Country; rockabilly; folk rock
- Length: 2:09 (US mono); 1:43 (UK mono); 1:44 (stereo)
- Label: United Artists, Capitol (US); Parlophone (UK)
- Songwriter: Lennon–McCartney
- Producer: George Martin

The Beatles US singles chronology
"And I Love Her" (1964)	"I'll Cry Instead" (1964)	"Matchbox" (1964)

"I'll Cry Instead" is a song written by John Lennon (credited to Lennon–McCartney), and recorded by the English rock band the Beatles for their third studio album, A Hard Day's Night (1964), a part-studio and part-soundtrack album to their film of the same name (1964). In the United States, the song originally appeared in the US version of A Hard Day's Night before it was released as a single backed with "I'm Happy Just to Dance with You" along with the US album Something New.

== Background and composition ==
Both John Lennon and Paul McCartney identified "I'll Cry Instead" as having been written entirely by Lennon. Lennon wrote the song for inclusion in the Beatles' 1964 film, A Hard Day's Night, intended for use in the film's "break out" and open field sequence. However, director Richard Lester disliked the song and replaced it in the film with "Can't Buy Me Love", so the band opted to wait on its recording. (Note: By contrast, author John C. Winn writes that Lennon likely composed the song in May 1964 while holidaying in Tahiti with his wife Cynthia, bandmate George Harrison and Harrison's girlfriend, Pattie Boyd.)

=== Lyrics ===
Lennon later reflected that the lyrics of "I'll Cry Instead" represent his then newfound feelings of frustration with success and the sense that he had lost his freedom. Lennon's wife, Cynthia Lennon, similarly described the lyrics as a cry for help, explaining that "[i]t reflects the frustration he felt at that time", being "the idol of millions ... [while] the freedom and fun of the early days had gone." McCartney later suggested the song referred to difficulties in Lennon's marriage with Cynthia.

"I'll Cry Instead", unlikely as it may seem, was ... an unheralded slice of Lennon autobiography. The sheer admission of weakness was news in itself, but Lennon later saw the middle eight of the song – with its terror of being seen as weak, and desire to hide from the public gaze – as an honest personal statement.

— Author Peter Doggett, 2005

In contrast to the Beatles' earlier teenage love songs, the lyrics of "I'll Cry Instead" are comparatively darker. The song's singer explains that, while he is now crying over a lost love, he plans to seek vengeance and break the hearts of girls "around the world", thereby punishing anyone who had ever rejected him. Author and musician John Kruth describes the song as one of Lennon's "stalker songs", alongside his other 1964 compositions "You Can't Do That" and "No Reply", dealing in themes of separation and uncontrollable jealousy. The singer makes reference to a chip on his shoulder, something author Steve Turner suggests signals Lennon's entrance into a period of self-examination that lasted through the 1969–1970 break-up of the Beatles and his first solo albums.

=== Music ===
"I'll Cry Instead" is in 4/4 (common time) and is in the key of G major, except the bridge, which modulates to D major. The song uses the three blues chords I, IV and V. Structurally, it employs two bridges while avoiding instrumental solos and double verses between bridges.

Among musicologists and authors, several describe "I'll Cry Instead" as country, including Ian MacDonald, Jean-Michael Guesdon & Philippe Margotin, Alan W. Pollack, Tim Riley and William Ruhlmann. Jonathan Gould calls it "rockabilly-styled", and Stephen Thomas Erlewine describes it as "tough folk rock". Country music was popular in the Beatles' hometown of Liverpool throughout the 1950s and Lennon listened to the genre regularly before he experienced rock and roll. Doggett writes that the song is the first among several by the Beatles from 1964 and 1965 that were overtly country and rockabilly influenced, as does critic Richie Unterberger, who compares the song to the Beatles' next studio album, Beatles for Sale, and McCartney's 1965 composition "I've Just Seen a Face". Doggett further comments that, even if it lacks the "pace or bite of Carl Perkins or Elvis Presley at their peak", the influence is heard in the lead guitar work of George Harrison, as well as Lennon's rhythm guitar playing and chord progressions.

== Production ==
=== Recording ===
The Beatles recorded "I'll Cry Instead" on 1 June 1964, during an afternoon session in which they also recorded covers of "Matchbox" and "Slow Down". Recording took place in EMI's Studio Two, with George Martin producing the session, assisted by balance engineer Norman Smith. Rather than recording the song straight through, the Beatles split it into two parts designated "Section A" and "Section B", something author John C. Winn suggests would allow for greater versatility in editing the track into the film.

Six takes of "Section A" were recorded followed by two takes of "Section B", with the latter takes marked seven and eight. Both sections consist of four tracks, with electric guitar, bass and drums on the first track; Lennon's vocal on the second; his acoustic guitar on the third; and overdubs onto the fourth, including a tambourine from Ringo Starr and a second vocal from Lennon to double-track his original. (Note: Musicologist Walter Everett writes that Lennon played tambourine, something MacDonald finds unlikely "in view of [Lennon's] notoriously poor sense of rhythm and the arcane subtleties of decent tambourine playing". Authors Kenneth Womack and Guesdon & Margotin also write that Starr played tambourine.) On the third line of each verse ("show you what your lovin' man can do"), McCartney adds a bass break which Riley suggests anticipates those heard on the Beatles' 1966 songs "Rain" and "I'm Only Sleeping".

=== Mixing ===
On 4 June 1964, Martin and Smith mixed several songs, including "I'll Cry Instead". They mixed each section for mono, then edited takes six and eight together; take six consists of the first two verses, the bridge and the third verse, while take eight begins at 1:09, containing the fourth verse, a repeating bridge and a fifth verse. The completed mono mix lasts 2:04. On 9 June, Martin and Smith copied this mix, sending it to the US record labels United Artists and Capitol.

On 22 June 1964, Martin and Smith finished production on the rest of the A Hard Day's Night LP, including mixing "I'll Cry Instead" for stereo. Like the mono version, they edited together takes six and eight, but joined the takes at a different place. After an edit at 1:08, the song cuts to the second bridge, omitting the fourth verse and resulting in a length of 1:43, 21 seconds shorter than the US mono mix. To make the mono and stereo version match, they roughly trimmed the mono version, bringing it down to 1:44, though this fix was only made to the UK mono releases, the longer mono version having already been sent for printing in the US. (Note: The stereo versions used in both the UK and US are identical.)

== Release ==
EMI's Parlophone label released the A Hard Day's Night LP in the UK on 10 July 1964. "I'll Cry Instead" appears on the album's second side, sequenced alongside the other tracks that do not appear in the film. Despite the song's absence from the film, United Artists kept the song on the North American version of A Hard Day's Night, released in the US on 26 June 1964. Capitol retained the rights to the same songs, so long as they were not marketed as a film soundtrack, and began issuing songs from the United Artists soundtrack as singles in the US. The label released "I'll Cry Instead" as a single in the US on 20 July 1964, backed with "I'm Happy Just to Dance with You". The song reached No. 22 on the Cash Box Top 100 and No. 25 on the Billboard Hot 100 record charts, additionally achieving No. 16 in Canada. Capitol collected the released singles on the North American LP Something New, also released on 20 July 1964, sequencing "I'll Cry Instead" as the album's opening track. (Note: Journalist Nicholas Schaffner calls Something New "deceptively titled", while Gould describes it as "[cunningly] titled considering that five of its tracks had already been release twice in the American market".)

When Universal Pictures and Walter Shenson re-released A Hard Day's Night in cinemas in 1982, "I'll Cry Instead" was included in an opening sequence as a tribute to Lennon, consisting of a "Swingin'" early to mid-1960s-style collage of photos of the Beatles in 1964.

== Personnel ==
According to Ian MacDonald:

- John Lennon – double-tracked vocal, acoustic rhythm guitar
- Paul McCartney – bass
- George Harrison – lead guitar
- Ringo Starr – drums, tambourine

== Chart performance ==
1964 weekly chart performance
Chart (1964)	Peak position
Canada (CHUM)	20
Canada Top Singles (RPM)	16
US Billboard Hot 100	25
US Cash Box Top 100	22
US Record World 100 Top Pops	28
