= And I Love Her =

1964 single by the Beatles

- US picture sleeve

Single by the Beatles

from the album A Hard Day's Night
- B-side: "If I Fell"
- Released: 20 July 1964
- Recorded: 25–27 February 1964
- Studio: EMI, London
- Genre: Pop, bolero
- Length: 2:32
- Label: Capitol
- Songwriter: Lennon–McCartney
- Producer: George Martin

The Beatles US singles chronology
"A Hard Day's Night" (1964)	"And I Love Her" (1964)	"I'll Cry Instead" (1964)

Audio sample
- file; help

"And I Love Her (Instrumental)"
- US picture sleeve

Single by George Martin and His Orchestra

from the album A Hard Day's Night
- B-side: "Ringo's Theme (This Boy)"
- Released: 18 July 1964
- Recorded: 25–27 February 1964
- Length: 3:43
- Label: United Artists
- Songwriter: Lennon–McCartney
- Producer: George Martin

"And I Love Her" is a ballad recorded by English rock band the Beatles, written primarily by Paul McCartney and credited to the Lennon–McCartney partnership. It is the fifth track of their third UK album A Hard Day's Night and was released 20 July 1964, along with "If I Fell", as a single release by Capitol Records in the United States, reaching No. 12 on the Billboard Hot 100.

The Beatles performed "And I Love Her" just once outside EMI Studios; on 14 July 1964 they played it for an edition of the BBC's Top Gear radio show, which was broadcast two days later. "And I Love Her" has been covered by a variety of artists, including Esther Phillips, Kurt Cobain and Santo & Johnny.

== Composition ==
A majority of the composition shifts back and forth between the key of E and its relative minor C♯m. It also changes keys altogether just before the solo, to F. The final chord is a D major. This technique of ending is known as a Picardy third resolution.

McCartney called "And I Love Her" "the first ballad I impressed myself with". Lennon called it McCartney's "first 'Yesterday'". Though the song was written mainly by McCartney, John Lennon claimed in an interview with Playboy that his major contribution was the middle eight section ("A love like ours/Could never die/As long as I/Have you near me").

Beatles publisher Dick James lends support to this claim, saying that the middle eight was added during recording at the suggestion of producer George Martin (an early take of the song was released on Anthology 1 in 1995, and the middle eight had not yet been added). According to James, Lennon called for a break and "within half an hour [Lennon and McCartney] wrote ... a very constructive middle to a very commercial song." McCartney, on the other hand, maintains that "the middle eight is mine ... I wrote this on my own. I would say that John probably helped with the middle eight, but he can't say 'It's mine'." McCartney has credited George Harrison with composing the signature guitar riff, saying it "made a stunning difference to the song". That four-note motif, played in a higher octave, had previously been played by Harrison in The Beatles' arrangement of "The Honeymoon Song" (Sansom / Theodorakis) (as recorded in their BBC session for "Pop Goes the Beatles" the previous August, later released on Live at the BBC).

"The 'And' in the title was an important thing – 'And I Love Her,' it came right out of left field, you were right up to speed the minute you heard it," McCartney said. "The title comes in the second verse and it doesn't repeat. You would often go to town on the title, but this was almost an aside: 'Oh ... and I love you.'"

Cash Box described the song as an "extremely pretty, soft beat cha cha opus" that the Beatles "wax in soft and tender fashion."

An instrumental version of "And I Love Her", orchestrated by George Martin, was released as a single with "Ringo's Theme (This Boy)" as the B-side on 18 July 1964. It failed to chart on the US Billboard Hot 100, peaking at number 105, while "Ringo's Theme (This Boy)" peaked at number 53 later that year. "And I Love Her" was included on Martin's Parlophone album Off the Beatle Track and the EP Music From A Hard Day's Night by the George Martin Orchestra, released on 19 February 1965. It was also included on the American A Hard Day's Night soundtrack album.

== Recording ==
Recorded by the Beatles over three days, in Abbey Road Studio Two, the sessions were produced by George Martin and engineered by Norman Smith. The second engineer was Richard Langham.

=== Day 1 ===
Work began at 2:30pm on Tuesday 25 February 1964 (George Harrison's 21st birthday) for the first day of the sessions for the Hard Day's Night soundtrack and the accompanying album. Two takes were recorded. Take 1 was incomplete, but Take 2 was complete. However, the Beatles decided a lighter touch was required. Take 2 was eventually released on Anthology 1 in 1995. This version was missing the middle-eight.

Instrumentation on this session was

- Paul McCartney – lead vocal, 1963 Höfner 500/1 bass guitar through Vox AC-100 bass amp.
- John Lennon – 1964 Rickenbacker 325 electric guitar through Vox AC-50 guitar amp
- George Harrison – 1964 Rickenbacker 360-12, 12 string electric guitar through Vox AC-50 guitar amp
- Ringo Starr – Ludwig drum kit

=== Day 2 ===
The following day, Wednesday 26 February, a further 17 takes (Takes 3–19) were made in a session lasting from 7:00–10:00pm. Although Starr swapped his drums for bongos and claves halfway through the session, they were still not happy. It was during this session that they stopped for a tea break and to write the middle eight. A brief fragment of Take 11 can be heard in the closing credits of Episode 8 of Anthology, where Paul sings "And if you saw my love, I'd love her [too]..." before the take breaks down.

Instrumentation on both this session and Day 3 was

- Paul McCartney – lead vocal, 1963 Höfner 500/1 bass guitar through Vox AC-100 bass amp
- John Lennon – Harrison's 1962 Gibson J-160E acoustic-electric guitar through Vox AC-50 guitar amp
- George Harrison – 1964 José Ramírez Guitarra de Estudio classical guitar
- Ringo Starr – Ludwig drum kit, switching to bongos

=== Day 3 ===
An additional two takes (Takes 20 and 21) were recorded on the morning of Thursday 27 February, beginning at 10:00am. Take 20 saw the basic track laid down, while Take 21 was an overdub of McCartney's double-tracked lead vocal and Starr's claves.

== Mixing and release ==
All mixes were prepared from Take 21.

=== First mono mix ===
This initial mono mix was made in the Abbey Road Studio One control room on Tuesday 3 March. As for the recording session, Martin and Smith were producer and engineer. The second engineer was A.B. Lincoln.

The mix features McCartney's single-tracked vocal, with only selected phrases (for example, the title) highlighted by double tracking.

This mix was sent to Capitol and United Artists on Tuesday 9 June, and released on the US mono version of the A Hard Day's Night soundtrack album on Friday 26 June 1964. The stereo version of the album used a fake stereo version of this mono mix.

This mix was also used on the mono version of the Capitol album Something New, released on Monday 20 July 1964.

This mix was also used on the film print of A Hard Day's Night except the speed was slower in a low pitch.

It can currently be found as part of The Capitol Albums, Volume 1 box set.

=== Second mono mix ===
This second mono mix was made in the Abbey Road Studio One control room on Monday 22 June. Martin and Smith were again producer and engineer. The second engineer was Geoff Emerick.

In this mix, McCartney's vocal is double-tracked throughout, except for the first two lines of the third verse.

This mix was released on the UK mono version of A Hard Day's Night on Friday 10 July 1964.

It can currently be found on The Beatles in Mono box set.

=== Stereo mix ===
A stereo mix of "And I Love Her" was made on Monday 22 June immediately after Mono Remix 2. As with Mono Remix 2, McCartney's vocal is double-tracked throughout, except for the first two lines of the third verse.

This mix was released on the UK stereo version of A Hard Day's Night on Friday 10 July 1964.

This mix was also used on the stereo version of the Capitol album Something New, released on Monday 20 July 1964.

It can currently be found on the A Hard Day's Night CD, and as part of The Capitol Albums, Volume 1 box set.

=== Extended stereo mix ===
The German version of Something New contained an edited version of the 22 June stereo mix, repeating the closing guitar riff six times instead of four. This version also appeared on the American Rarities album in 1980. It is not known when this edit was made. It has not yet been released on CD.

== Personnel ==
According to Ian MacDonald:

- Paul McCartney – vocals, bass guitar
- John Lennon – acoustic 6 string rhythm guitar (Gibson J-160E)
- George Harrison – classical lead guitar
- Ringo Starr – bongos, claves
- George Martin – producer

== Covers and other versions ==
As with many Beatles songs, this has been covered by many artists in varying styles. Notably, Esther Phillips reversed the gender of the song in 1965; her "And I Love Him" reached No. 54 that year on the Billboard Hot 100. It also reached No. 11 on the Billboard Hot Rhythm & Blues Singles and No. 14 on the Billboard Easy Listening chart.

An instrumental cover by Santo & Johnny topped the Mexican charts in 1965. Jazz pianist Brad Mehldau included an extended instrumental trio version on his 2016 album Blues and Ballads, which an AllMusic review describes as "transfiguring the minor/major-key centers into something sweeping and operatic."

An outtake from the original studio sessions, Take 2 recorded 25 February 1964, was released on the 1995 issue of Anthology 1.

McCartney recorded a live version during an appearance on MTV Unplugged, which was released on his Unplugged (The Official Bootleg) album, with Hamish Stuart on lead vocal.

== Charts ==
Chart (1965)	Peak position
Belgium (Ultratop 50 Flanders)	10
US Billboard Hot 100	12
US Cash Box Top 100	14

== Certifications ==
Region	Certification	Certified units/sales
United Kingdom (BPI)	Silver	200,000^{‡}
^{‡} Sales+streaming figures based on certification alone.

== Kurt Cobain cover ==
"And I Love Her"

Single by Kurt Cobain

from the album Montage of Heck: The Home Recordings
- B-side: "Sappy"
- Released: November 2015
- Recorded: 1987–1988
- Studio: Cobain's home, Aberdeen, WA
- Genre: Folk rock
- Length: 2:05
- Label: Universal Music Group
- Songwriter: Lennon–McCartney

Kurt Cobain singles chronology
"The "Priest" They Called Him" (1993)	"And I Love Her" (2015)

In 2015, a solo version by Nirvana frontman Kurt Cobain was discovered by American documentary filmmaker Brett Morgen, and subsequently used in his biopic, Kurt Cobain: Montage of Heck. It was also released on the soundtrack album Montage of Heck: The Home Recordings as well as a 7-inch vinyl single. It comes from a home cassette recording made by Cobain on his acoustic guitar at his home in Aberdeen, WA, on an unspecified date between 1987 and 1988, before he founded Nirvana. It is the last single credited to Cobain, who died in 1994.

Chart performance

Chart (2015)	Peak position
US Hot Singles Sales (Billboard)	2
UK Physical Singles Sales (Official Charts Company)	2
UK Vinyl Singles Chart (Official Charts Company)	1
