= The Beatles albums discography =

Recording collections by English rock band

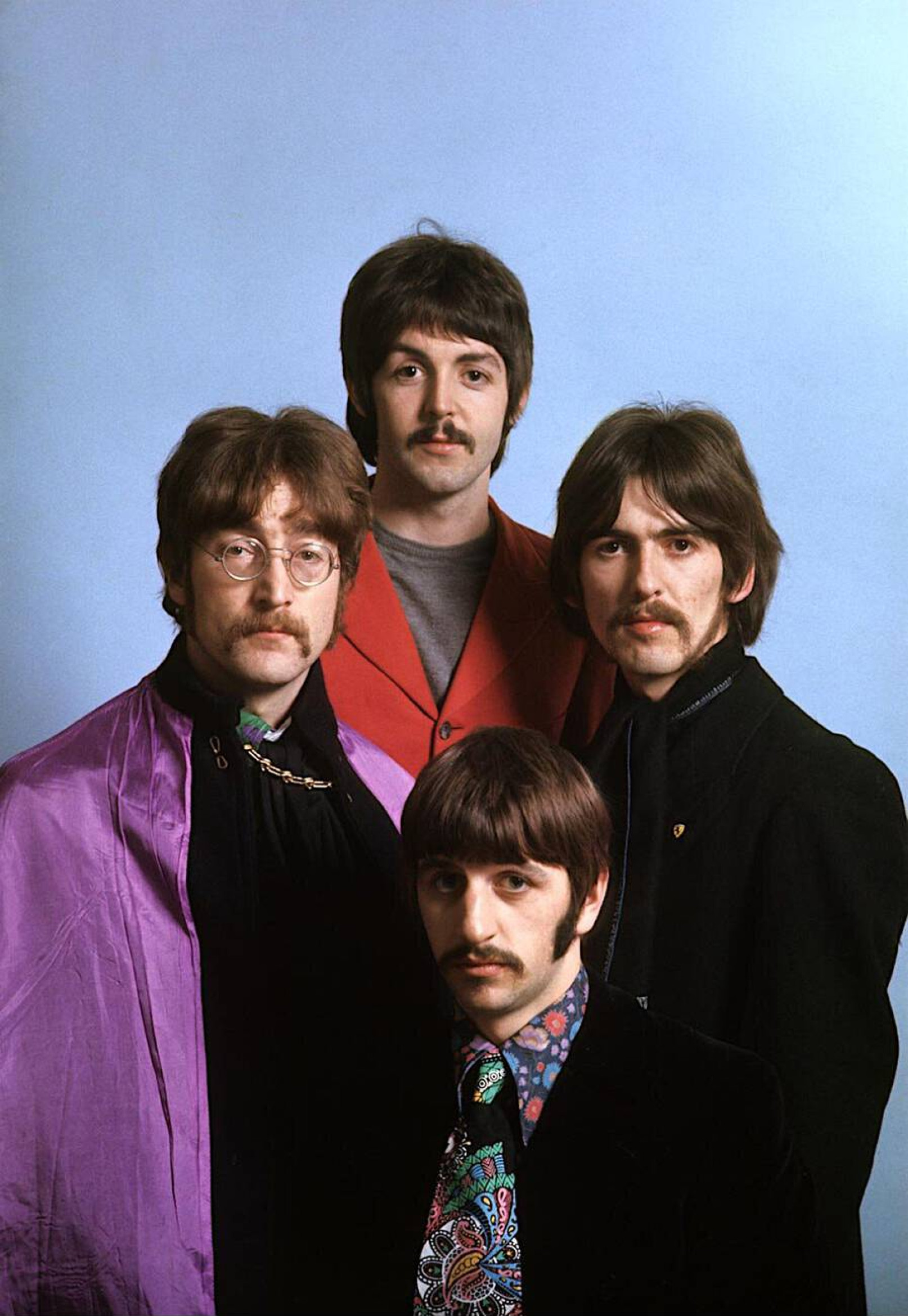
- The Beatles in 1967
- Studio albums: 12 (UK), 17 (US)
- EPs: 36
- Live albums: 5
- Compilation albums: 52
- Mash-ups: 2
- Box sets: 37

Worldwide, the English rock band the Beatles have released 12 studio albums (17 in the United States), 5 live albums, 52 compilation albums, 36 extended plays (EPs), and 37 box sets. Their output also includes vault items, remixed mash-ups and anniversary box-sets. In their native United Kingdom, during their active existence as a band, they released 12 studio albums (including 1 double album), 1 compilation album, and 13 EPs (including 1 double EP). The band's first eight albums were released on Parlophone, a subsidiary label of EMI. From 1968, in both the UK and the US, starting with the single "Hey Jude" and the album The Beatles (better known as "the White Album"), new releases appeared on the Beatles' own Apple label, although Parlophone and Capitol (in the US) catalogue numbers continued to be used for contractual reasons. The Beatles' international discography is complicated due to different versions of their albums sometimes being released in other countries, particularly during their early years on Capitol in North America. Prior to 1967, it was common practice for British releases to be reconfigured for the American market. The first seven British Beatles albums were converted into ten LPs for the American market, adding material from singles and the UK EPs; the band were unhappy with these reconfigurations. With the exception of Magical Mystery Tour, studio releases from Sgt. Pepper's Lonely Hearts Club Band in 1967 forward were uniform in both the UK and the US. Magical Mystery Tour was expanded from an EP to an LP as there was no market for EPs in the US at the time.

With the first CD releases of their albums in 1987 and 1988, the Beatles' core catalogue was harmonised worldwide to encompass their 12 original UK studio albums, the US Magical Mystery Tour album, and the newly assembled Past Masters: Volumes One and Two compilation albums consisting of all the studio recordings released during 1962 to 1970 that are not present on the UK studio albums or Magical Mystery Tour (mainly non-album singles, B-sides and EP tracks). When the core catalogue was reissued in remastered editions in 2009, the two volumes of Past Masters were combined into one double album. This core catalogue contains all 217 tracks (Note: The musicologist Alan W. Pollack identifies 219 tracks for his Notes on... series, counting 212 tracks along with six additional tracks that he did not separately identify because they were merely alternate versions of other songs (such as variations between the single version and the album version of the same track). Pollack also includes the song fragment "Can You Take Me Back", found in the transition between "Cry Baby Cry" and "Revolution 9" on the White Album, which is often not counted by other catalogs of Beatles songs. Other notable catalogs of Beatles songs, such as Ian MacDonald's Revolution in the Head, differ from this list as well.) intended for commercial release, either as album tracks, EP tracks, or singles, that were put out by the Beatles from 1962 to 1970. Since the standardisation of the catalogue, there have been several significant, fully-authorised, additional releases, such as The Beatles at the Hollywood Bowl (first issued 1977, issued on CD in 2016), Live at the BBC (1994), the Anthology series, and greatest hits collections 1962–1966, 1967–1970 (both first issued 1973, issued on CD 1993) and 1 (2000). The catalogue is currently distributed by Universal Music Enterprises' Calderstone Productions. The Beatles are the biggest selling musical act of all time, selling over 500 million records.

The Beatles' discography was originally released on the vinyl format, with full-length long plays (LPs), shorter EPs and singles. Over the years, the collection has also been released on cassette, 8-track, compact disc (CD), on a USB flash drive in MP3 and 24-bit FLAC format, and on digital media streaming services. The Beatles' UK discography was first released on CD in 1987 and 1988. Between 1962 and 1968, the Beatles released their songs in both mono and stereo versions. The band's catalogue was remastered in both mono and stereo in 2009.

== Albums ==
=== Original UK studio albums ===
List of studio albums, with selected chart positions and certification
Title	Album details (Note: Release dates are per The Complete Beatles Chronicle by Mark Lewisohn, unless otherwise noted.)	Peak chart positions							Certifications	Sales
Title	Album details	UK	AUS	CAN	FRA	GER	NOR	US	Certifications	Sales
Please Please Me	Released: 22 March 1963; Label: Parlophone	1	—	19	5	5	2	155 (Note: Not released in the US until 1987; Chart position is from 2010.)	BPI: Platinum; ARIA: Gold; MC: Gold; RIAA: Platinum	
With the Beatles (Note: With the Beatles was released in Canada as Beatlemania! With the Beatles and in France as Les Beatles.)	Released: 22 November 1963; Label: Parlophone (UK), Capitol (Canada), Odeon (France)	1	—	1	5	1	1	179 (Note: Not released in the US until 1987; chart position is from 2010.)	BPI: Gold; ARIA: Gold; BVMI: Gold; MC: Gold; RIAA: Gold	
A Hard Day's Night	Released: 10 July 1964; Label: Parlophone	1	1	—	—	1	1	—	BPI: Platinum; ARIA: Gold	
Beatles for Sale	Released: 4 December 1964; Label: Parlophone	1	1	—	—	1	1	—	BPI: Gold; ARIA: Gold; MC: Gold; RIAA: Platinum	UK: 750,000
Help!	Released: 6 August 1965; Label: Parlophone	1	1	—	5	1	1	—	BPI: Platinum; ARIA: Gold	
Rubber Soul	Released: 3 December 1965; Label: Parlophone	1	1	—	5	1	1	—	BPI: 2× Platinum; ARIA: Platinum; BVMI: Gold	
Revolver	Released: 5 August 1966; Label: Parlophone	1	1	—	5	1	2	—	BPI: 3× Platinum; ARIA: Platinum	
Sgt. Pepper's Lonely Hearts Club Band	Released: 26 May 1967; Label: Parlophone	1	1	1	4	1	1	1	BPI: 18× Platinum; ARIA: 4× Platinum; BVMI: Platinum; MC: 8× Platinum; RIAA: Diamond (11× Platinum); SNEP: Gold	UK: 5,340,000
The Beatles ("The White Album")	Released: 22 November 1968; Label: Apple	1	1	1	1	1	1	1	BPI: 2× Platinum; ARIA: 2× Platinum; MC: 8× Platinum; RIAA: Diamond (24× Platinum); SNEP: Gold	
Yellow Submarine (Note: The album also contains scores by George Martin and His Orchestra.)	Released: 17 January 1969; Label: Apple	3	4	1	4	5	1	2	BPI: Gold; MC: Gold; RIAA: Platinum	
Abbey Road	Released: 26 September 1969; Label: Apple	1	1	1	1	1	1	1	BPI: 8× Platinum; ARIA: 3× Platinum; BVMI: Platinum; MC: Diamond; RIAA: Diamond (12× Platinum); SNEP: Platinum	UK: 2,240,608
Let It Be	Released: 8 May 1970; Label: Apple	1	1	1	5	4	1	1	BPI: Platinum; ARIA: Platinum; MC: 3× Platinum; RIAA: 4× Platinum; SNEP: Gold	
"—" denotes that the recording did not chart or was not released in that territory.

=== Original US studio albums ===
List of studio albums with selected chart positions and certification
Title	Album details (Note: Release dates are per The Complete Beatles Chronicle by Mark Lewisohn, unless otherwise noted.)	Peak chart positions								Certifications	Sales
Title	Album details	UK	AUS	CAN	FRA	GER	NOR	US	US Cash Box	Certifications	Sales
Introducing... The Beatles	Released: 10 January 1964 (Note: Lewisohn indicates the album may have also been released on 22 July 1963.); Label: Vee-Jay	—	—	—	—	—	—	2	2	RIAA: Platinum	
Meet the Beatles!	Released: 20 January 1964; Label: Capitol	—	—	1	—	68	—	1	1	MC: Platinum; RIAA: 5× Platinum	
The Beatles' Second Album	Released: 10 April 1964; Label: Capitol	—	—	1	—	50	—	1	1	MC: Platinum; RIAA: 2× Platinum	
A Hard Day's Night	Released: 26 June 1964; Label: United Artists (Note: The original US release featured a different track listing to the UK release.) (Note: The album also contains songs by George Martin and His Orchestra.)	—	—	1	5	—	—	1	1	MC: Platinum; RIAA: 4× Platinum	
Something New	Released: 20 July 1964; Label: Capitol	—	—	2	—	38	—	2	2	MC: Gold; RIAA: 2× Platinum	
Beatles '65	Released: 15 December 1964; Label: Capitol	—	—	1	80	9	—	1	1	MC: Platinum; RIAA: 3× Platinum	
Beatles VI	Released: 14 June 1965; Label: Capitol	—	—	1	—	15	—	1	1	MC: Gold; RIAA: Platinum	
Help!	Released: 13 August 1965; Label: Capitol	—	—	1	—	—	—	1	1	MC: 2× Platinum; RIAA: 3× Platinum	
Rubber Soul	Released: 6 December 1965; Label: Capitol	—	—	1	—	—	—	1	1	MC: 2× Platinum; RIAA: 6× Platinum	
Yesterday and Today	Released: 15 June 1966; Label: Capitol	—	—	1	—	13	—	1	1	MC: Platinum; RIAA: 2× Platinum	
Revolver	Released: 8 August 1966; Label: Capitol	—	—	1	—	—	—	1	1	MC: 2× Platinum; RIAA: 5× Platinum	
Sgt. Pepper's Lonely Hearts Club Band	Released: 2 June 1967; Label: Capitol	1	1	1	4	1	1	1	1	BPI: 18× Platinum; ARIA: 4× Platinum; BVMI: Platinum; MC: 8× Platinum; RIAA: Diamond (11× Platinum); SNEP: Gold	UK: 5,340,000
Magical Mystery Tour	Released: 27 November 1967 (Note: Magical Mystery Tour as an album was created by Capitol for US release; it originally peaked at number 31 in the United Kingdom as an import of the United States issue. Parlophone instead issued a double EP. Parlophone eventually issued the album in the UK on 19 November 1976. It did not chart in Australia until October 1974.); Label: Capitol	31	48	17	2	8	11	1	1	BPI: Platinum; ARIA: Platinum; MC: 4× Platinum; RIAA: 6× Platinum	
The Beatles ("The White Album")	Released: 25 November 1968; Label: Apple	1	1	1	1	1	1	1	1	BPI: 2× Platinum; ARIA: 2× Platinum; MC: 8× Platinum; RIAA: Diamond (24× Platinum); SNEP: Gold	
Yellow Submarine (Note: The album also contains scores by George Martin and His Orchestra.)	Released: 13 January 1969; Label: Capitol	3	4	1	4	5	1	2	3	BPI: Gold; MC: Gold; RIAA: Platinum	
Abbey Road	Released: 1 October 1969; Label: Apple	1	1	1	1	1	1	1	1	BPI: 8× Platinum; ARIA: 3× Platinum; BVMI: Platinum; MC: Diamond; RIAA: Diamond (12× Platinum); SNEP: Platinum	UK: 2,240,608
Let It Be	Released: 18 May 1970; Label: Apple	1	1	1	5	4	1	1	1	BPI: Platinum; ARIA: Platinum; MC: 3× Platinum; RIAA: 4× Platinum; SNEP: Gold	
"—" denotes that the recording did not chart or was not released in that territory.

=== Standardised studio albums ===
Since the first release of their music on CD during 1987–1988, the Beatles' studio albums have been standardised worldwide to the following albums:

- Please Please Me (original UK album)
- With the Beatles (original UK album)
- A Hard Day's Night (original UK album)
- Beatles for Sale (original UK album)
- Help! (original UK album)
- Rubber Soul (original UK album)
- Revolver (original UK album)
- Sgt. Pepper's Lonely Hearts Club Band (original UK and US album)
- Magical Mystery Tour (original US album)
- The Beatles (original UK and US album)
- Yellow Submarine (original UK and US album)
- Abbey Road (original UK and US album)
- Let It Be (original UK and US album)

=== Standardised compilation album ===
- Past Masters (see Compilation albums; compiles all studio recordings the Beatles commercially released during 1962–1970 that do not appear on the thirteen previously listed albums)

=== Live albums ===
List of live albums, with selected chart positions and certifications
Title	Album details	Peak chart positions										Sales	Certifications
Title	Album details	UK	AUS	AUT	CAN	GER	NLD	NOR	NZ	SWE	US	Sales	Certifications
Live! at the Star-Club in Hamburg, Germany; 1962 (UK and German title) / First Live Recordings (US title)	Released: 27 May 1977; Label: Lingasong (UK), Bellaphon (Germany), Pickwick (US)	—	24	12	—	21	—	16	—	—	111	GER: 300,000	
The Beatles at the Hollywood Bowl (Note: The Beatles at the Hollywood Bowl was re-released on 9 September 2016 as Live at the Hollywood Bowl for the Ron Howard documentary Eight Days a Week – The Touring Years.)	Released: 4 May 1977; Label: Parlophone (UK), Capitol (US)	1	8	3	—	10	—	4	18	17	2		BPI: Gold; MC: Platinum; RIAA: Platinum
Live at the BBC	Released: 30 November 1994; Label: Parlophone (UK), Capitol (US)	1	2	6	2	10	2	—	4	4	3		ARIA: Platinum; BPI: 2× Platinum; BVMI: Gold; IFPI AUT: Gold; MC: 8× Platinum; NVPI: Gold; RIAA: 4× Platinum
On Air – Live at the BBC Volume 2	Released: 11 November 2013; Label: Apple, UM^{e}	12	28	7	7	8	6	9	31	36	7		BPI: Silver; MC: Platinum
Get Back – The Rooftop Performance	Released: 28 January 2022; Label: Calderstone Productions	—	—	—	—	—	—	—	—	—	—		
"—" denotes that the recording did not chart or was not released in that territory.

=== Compilation albums ===
List of compilation albums, with selected chart positions and certifications
Title	Album details	Peak chart positions										Certifications
Title	Album details	UK	AUS	AUT	CAN	FRA	GER	NOR	NZ	SWE	US	Certifications
The Beatles with Tony Sheridan and Their Guests (with Tony Sheridan and the Titans)	Released: 3 February 1964 (US); Label: MGM	—	—	—	—	—	—	—	—	—	68	
Jolly What! (with Frank Ifield)	Released: 26 February 1964 (US); Label: Vee-Jay	—	—	—	—	—	—	—	—	—	103	
The Beatles' First! (with Tony Sheridan)	Released: April 1964 (Germany); Released: 4 August 1967 (UK); Label: Polydor	—	—	—	—	7	—	6	—	—	—	SNEP: Gold
The Beatles Beat	Released: 15 April 1964 (Germany); Label: Odeon	—	—	—	—	—	6	—	—	—	—	
Les Beatles (with Tony Sheridan - 25 cm lp)	Released: 22 May 1964 (France); Label: Polydor	—	—	—	—	—	—	—	—	—	—	
Ain't She Sweet (with Tony Sheridan and the Swallows)	Released: 5 October 1964 (US); Label: Atco	—	—	—	—	—	—	—	—	—	—	
The Beatles vs the Four Seasons (Note: The Beatles vs the Four Seasons was a repackaging of Introducing... The Beatles and Golden Hits of the Four Seasons.) (with the Four Seasons)	Released: October 1964 (US); Label: Vee-Jay	—	—	—	—	—	—	—	—	—	142	
The Beatles' Story	Released: 23 November 1964 (US); Label: Capitol	—	—	—	—	—	—	—	—	—	7	RIAA: Gold
The Early Beatles	Released: 22 March 1965 (US); Label: Capitol	—	—	—	—	—	—	—	—	—	43	MC: Platinum; RIAA: Platinum
The Beatles	Released: April 1965 (East Germany); Label: Amiga	—	—	—	—	—	—	—	—	—	—	
The Beatles' Greatest	Released: 18 June 1965 (Germany); Label: Odeon	—	—	—	—	—	38	—	—	—		
The Beatles in Italy	Released: 13 July 1965 (Italy); Label: Parlophone	—	—	—	—	—	—	—	—	—	—	
Les Beatles dans leurs 14 plus grands succès	Released: 1 September 1965 (France); Label: Odeon	—	—	—	—	80	—	—	—	—	—	
Los Beatles	Released: 19 November 1965 (Argentina); Label: Odeon	—	—	—	—	—	—	—	—	—	—	
Greatest Hits Volume 1	Released: 7 June 1966 (Australia); Label: Parlophone	—	11	—	—	—	—	—	—	—	—	
A Collection of Beatles Oldies	Released: 9 December 1966 (UK); Label: Parlophone	7	7	—	—	5	—	4	—	—	—	
Greatest Hits Volume 2	Released: 16 February 1967 (Australia); Label: Parlophone	—	9	—	—	—	—	—	—	—	—	
Very Together (Canadian title) / In the Beginning (Circa 1960) (US title) (with Tony Sheridan)	Released: 4 November 1969 (Canada), 4 May 1970 (US); Label: Polydor	—	—	—	—	—	—	—	—	—	117	
Hey Jude	Released: 26 February 1970 (US), 11 May 1979 (UK); Label: Parlophone (UK), Capitol (US)	—	1	—	2	11	—	8	—	—	2	MC: 4× Platinum; RIAA: 3× Platinum
From Then to You (UK title) / The Beatles' Christmas Album (US title)	Released: 18 December 1970; Label: Parlophone (UK), Capitol (US)	—	—	—	—	—	—	—	—	—	—	
Por Siempre Beatles	Released: 8 October 1971 (Argentina); Label: Odeon	—	—	—	—	—	—	—	—	—	—	
The Essential Beatles	Released: 2 February 1972 (Australia/New Zealand); Label: Apple	—	10	—	—	—	—	—	—	—	—	
1962–1966 ("The Red Album")	Released: 2 April 1973; Label: Parlophone (UK), Capitol (US)	3	9	1	38	1	2	1	5	22	3	BPI: 3× Platinum; ARIA: 5× Platinum; BVMI: 4× Platinum; IFPI AUT: 3× Platinum; MC: Diamond; RIAA: Diamond (15× Platinum); SNEP: Platinum
1967–1970 ("The Blue Album")	Released: 2 April 1973; Label: Parlophone (UK), Capitol (US)	2	8	1	42	1	2	1	4	23	1	BPI: 4× Platinum; ARIA: 5× Platinum; BVMI: 3× Platinum; IFPI AUT: 3× Platinum; IFPI NOR: Gold; MC: Diamond; RIAA: Diamond (17× Platinum); SNEP: 2× Platinum
Rock 'n' Roll Music	Released: 7 June 1976; Label: Parlophone (UK), Capitol (US)	11	4	6	2	3	10	8	2	18	2	BPI: Gold; RIAA: Platinum; SNEP: Gold
Love Songs	Released: 21 October 1977; Label: Parlophone (UK), Capitol (US)	7	59	—	18	11	—	20	3	—	24	BPI: Silver; MC: Platinum; RIAA: 3× Platinum
Rarities	Released: 2 December 1978 (UK); Label: Parlophone	71	—	—	—	—	—	—	—	—	—	BPI: Silver
20 Golden Hits	Released: 1979 (Germany); Label: Odeon	—	—	7	—	—	4	—	—	—	—	
Rarities	Released: 24 March 1980 (US); Label: Capitol	—	27	—	26	—	—	—	43	—	21	MC: Gold; RIAA: Gold
The Beatles Ballads	Released: 20 October 1980 (UK/Canada); Label: Parlophone (UK), Capitol (Canada)	17	1	—	69	—	—	—	2	—	—	BPI: Gold; MC: Gold
Rock 'n' Roll Music, Volume One	Released: 24 October 1980; Label: Parlophone (UK), Capitol (US), Axis (New Zealand); first half of the original album from 1976	—	—	—	—	—	—	—	—	—	—	MC: 2× Platinum; RIAA: Platinum
Rock 'n' Roll Music, Volume Two	Released: 24 October 1980; Label: Parlophone (UK), Capitol(US), Axis (New Zealand); second half of the original album from 1976	—	—	—	—	—	—	—	—	—	—	MC: 2× Platinum; RIAA: Platinum
The Beatles 1967–1970	Released: 1980 (East Germany); Label: Amiga	—	—	—	—	—	—	—	—	—	—	
The Beatles	Released: January 1982 (East Germany); Label: Amiga	—	—	—	—	—	—	—	—	—	—	
Reel Music	Released: 22 March 1982; Label: Parlophone (UK), Capitol (US)	56	26	—	19	—	—	—	—	—	19	MC: Gold; RIAA: Gold
20 Greatest Hits	Released: 11 October 1982 (US edition) 18 October 1982 (UK edition); Label: Capitol (US), Parlophone (UK)	10	52	—	50	—	—	—	4	—	50	BPI: Platinum; MC: 3× Platinum; RIAA: 2× Platinum
The Number Ones	Released: 13 May 1983 (Australia); Label: EMI	—	1	—	—	—	—	—	—	—	—	
The Early Tapes of the Beatles (with Tony Sheridan)	Released: 10 December 1984 (UK); Label: Polydor	—	—	—	—	—	—	—	—	—	—	
Past Masters, Volume One (Note: Past Masters was initially released as two separate CDs on 7 March 1988, with a two-LP vinyl set combining both volumes following on 24 October 1988 in the US and 10 November 1988 in the UK. The combined set was released on CD on 9 September 2009.)	Released: 7 March 1988; Label: Parlophone (UK), Capitol (US)	49	79	—	—	21	—	—	—	—	149	BPI: Gold; ARIA: Gold; RIAA: Platinum; RIANZ: Gold
Past Masters, Volume Two	Released: 7 March 1988; Label: Parlophone (UK), Capitol (US)	46	75	—	—	15	—	—	—	—	121	BPI: Gold; ARIA: Gold; RIAA: Platinum; RIANZ: Gold
Anthology 1	Released: 21 November 1995; Label: Parlophone (UK), Capitol (US)	2	1	4	1	1	1	5	1	2	1	ARIA: 2× Platinum; BPI: 2× Platinum; BVMI: Gold; IFPI AUT: Gold; IFPI NOR: Gold; MC: 9× Platinum; RIAA: 8× Platinum
Anthology 2	Released: 18 March 1996; Label: Parlophone (UK), Capitol (US)	1	2	9	3	2	4	5	3	2	1	ARIA: Gold; BPI: Platinum; MC: 4× Platinum; RIAA: 4× Platinum; SNEP: Gold
Anthology 3 (Note: The album also contains a song by George Martin and His Orchestra.)	Released: 28 October 1996; Label: Parlophone (UK), Capitol (US)	4	3	15	3	9	9	13	10	5	1	ARIA: Gold; BPI: Platinum; MC: 2× Platinum; RIAA: 3× Platinum
Yellow Submarine Songtrack	Released: 13 September 1999; Label: Parlophone (UK), Capitol (US)	8	—	8	12	31	11	1	—	22	15	BPI: Gold; RIAA: Gold
1	Released: 13 November 2000; Label: Parlophone (UK), Capitol (US)	1	1	1	1	10	1	1	1	1	1	BPI: 13× Platinum; ARIA: 10× Platinum; BVMI: 11× Gold; IFPI AUT: 3× Platinum; IFPI NOR: 3× Platinum; MC: Diamond; RIAA: Diamond (11× Platinum); RIANZ: 15× Platinum; SNEP: 2× Platinum
Beatles Bop – Hamburg Days (with Tony Sheridan)	Released: 6 November 2001 (Germany); Label: Bear Family	—	—	—	—	—	—	—	—	—	—	
Let It Be... Naked	Released: 17 November 2003; Label: Parlophone (UK), Capitol (US)	7	11	8	8	14	13	6	23	2	5	BPI: Gold; ARIA: Gold; BVMI: Gold; RIAA: Platinum
Past Masters (both volumes combined as one double album)	Released: 9 September 2009; Label: Parlophone (UK), Capitol (US)	31	34	40	16	—	61	—	33	36	154	BPI: Silver; MC: Gold
Tomorrow Never Knows	Released: 24 July 2012; Label: Apple, EMI	44	34	34	15	—	—	22	37	—	24	
The Beatles Bootleg Recordings 1963	Released: 17 December 2013; Label: Apple, UM^{e}	—	—	—	—	—	—	—	—	—	172	
Mono Masters (Note: Originally released as part of the 2009 The Beatles in Mono box set. Released separately as 2 CDs or 3 LPs on 9-9-2014 in the UK and the following day in the US.)	Released: 9 September 2014; Label: Parlophone (UK), Capitol (US)	—	—	—	—	—	—	—	—	—	—	
Beatles '64 (Music from the Disney+ Documentary)	Released: 22 November 2024; Label: UMG Recordings; Digital release only	—	—	—	—	—	—	—	—	—	—	
Anthology Highlights	Released: 29 August 2025; Digital release only	—	—	—	—	—	—	—	—	—	—	
Anthology 4	Released: 21 November 2025; Label: Apple	9	20	10	83	—	—	—	33	10	48	
Anthology: Soundtrack to the Disney+ Series (Episodes 1-3)	Released: 26 November 2025; Label: Apple; Digital release only	—	—	—	—	—	—	—	—	—	—	
Anthology: Soundtrack to the Disney+ Series (Episodes 4-6)	Released: 27 November 2025; Label: Apple; Digital release only	—	—	—	—	—	—	—	—	—	—	
Anthology: Soundtrack to the Disney+ Series (Episodes 7-9)	Released: 28 November 2025; Label: Apple; Digital release only	—	—	—	—	—	—	—	—	—	—	
"All You Need Is Love"	Released: 24 June 2026; Label: Apple; Digital release only	—	—	—	—	—	—	—	—	—	—	
"—" denotes that the recording did not chart or was not released in that territory.

=== Mash-up albums ===
List of mash-up albums, with selected chart positions and certifications
Title	Album details	Peak chart positions										Certifications
Title	Album details	UK	AUS	AUT	CAN	FRA	GER	NOR	NZ	SWE	US	Certifications
Liverpool Sound Collage (with Paul McCartney, Super Furry Animals and Youth)	Released: 21 August 2000; Label: Hydra (UK), Capitol (US)	—	—	—	—	—	—	—	—	—	—	
Love	Released: 20 November 2006; Label: Parlophone (UK), Capitol (US)	3	2	3	1	1	2	8	2	2	4	BPI: 2× Platinum; ARIA: 2× Platinum; BVMI: 3× Gold; MC: 2× Platinum; RIAA: 2× Platinum; SNEP: Platinum
"—" denotes that the recording did not chart or was not released in that territory.

=== Box sets ===
List of box sets, with selected chart positions and certifications
Title	Album details	Peak chart positions										Certifications
Title	Album details	UK	AUS	AUT	CAN	FRA	GER	NOR	NZ	SWE	US	Certifications
Let It Be	Released: 1970 (UK); Label: Apple Records; the classic album was originally released as a box set with a 168-page book titled "Get Back" - also included stills and dialogue from the film	—	—	—	—	—	—	—	—	—	—	
Beatles FRC Box	Released: 1973 (US); Label: Apple Records, Capitol Records, Famous Record Club; mail-order box set	—	—	—	—	—	—	—	—	—	—	
The Singles Collection 1962-1970	Released: 1976 (UK); Label: Apple Records, Parlophone; this collection consisted of their 45s from those years	—	—	—	—	—	—	—	—	—	—	
The Beatles Collection (Note: The set also contains songs by George Martin and His Orchestra.)	Released: 2 November 1978; Label: Parlophone (UK), Capitol (US)	—	33	—	—	—	—	—	11	—	—	MC: Platinum
The Beatles Box	Released: 3 November 1980; Label: Parlophone (UK)	—	—	—	—	—	—	—	—	—	—	ARIA: Gold
The Beatles EP Collection (Note: The Beatles EP Collection is a 15-disc box set comprising the 13 original EPs released by Parlophone in the UK – including mono and stereo editions of the Magical Mystery Tour EP – and a new disc entitled The Beatles EP, which contains stereo mixes of the tracks "The Inner Light", "Baby, You're a Rich Man", "She's a Woman" and "This Boy".)	Released: 7 December 1981; Label: Parlophone (UK)	—	—	—	—	—	—	—	—	—	—	
The Beatles: The Collection	Released: October 1982; Label: Parlophone (UK)	—	—	—	—	—	—	—	—	—	—	
The Beatles Mono Collection	Released: October 1982; Label: Parlophone (UK)	—	—	—	—	—	—	—	—	—	—	
Sgt. Pepper's Lonely Hearts Club Band	Released: October 1982 (US); Label: Mobile Fidelity Sound Lab, EMI; limited edition box set	—	—	—	—	—	—	—	—	—	—	
The Beatles Singles Collection	Released: 1982 (UK); Label: Parlophone; included a few more 45s than the earlier singles collection, as well as a Love Me Do picture disc	—	—	—	—	—	—	—	—	—	—	
The Platinum Series Beatles Collection	Released: 1984 (US); Label: Capitol Records	—	—	—	—	—	—	—	—	—	—	
The Beatles Box Set	Released: 15 November 1988; Label: Parlophone (UK), Capitol (US)	—	82	—	—	—	—	—	—	—	—	RIAA: Platinum
Fab Four (CD & Book Set)	Released: October 1982 (UK); Label: Mobile Fidelity Sound Lab, EMI; limited edition interview box set	—	—	—	—	—	—	—	—	—	—	
The Beatles Inside Interviews	Released: 1995 (US); Label: LaserLight Digital	—	—	—	—	—	—	—	—	—	—	
The Beatles In Their Own Words - A Rockumentary	Released: 1995 (US); Label: LaserLight Digital	—	—	—	—	—	—	—	—	—	—	
Interviews 1 & 2	Released: 2003 (UK); Label: New Sound 2000 Ltd.	—	—	—	—	—	—	—	—	—	—	
The Capitol Albums, Volume 1	Released: 16 November 2004; Label: Capitol (US)	—	—	—	—	—	80	—	—	—	35	RIAA: Platinum
The Capitol Albums, Volume 2	Released: 11 April 2006; Label: Capitol (US)	—	—	—	83	—	—	—	—	—	46	RIAA: Gold
Bloomingdale's Limited Edition Ultimate Collector's Box Set	Released: October 21, 2008 (US); Label: Apple Records, Capitol Records; came with an IPod with a Beatles logo on it	—	—	—	—	—	—	—	—	—	—	
The Beatles in Mono (Note: The Beatles in Mono contains the exclusive album Mono Masters.)	Released: 9 September 2009; Label: Parlophone (UK), Capitol (US)	57	—	—	47	—	3	—	—	15	40	MC: Platinum; RIAA: Platinum
The Beatles (The Original Studio Recordings)	Released: 9 September 2009; Label: Parlophone (UK), Capitol (US)	24	23	58	4	—	—	3	22	15	15	MC: Diamond; RIAA: 3× Platinum
Magical Mystery Tour	Released: 2009 (US); Label: Apple Records, Capitol Records, Parlophone; limited edition box set came with an XL white T-shirt	—	—	—	—	—	—	—	—	—	—	
Help!	Released: 2009 (US); Label: Apple Records, Capitol Records, Parlophone; limited edition box set came with an XL white T-shirt	—	—	—	—	—	—	—	—	—	—	
A Hard Day's Night	Released: 2009 (US); Label: Apple Records, Capitol Records, Parlophone; limited edition box set came with an XL white T-shirt	—	—	—	—	—	—	—	—	—	—	
1962–1966 / 1967–1970	Released: 15 October 2010; Label: Apple, EMI	59	—	—	—	—	29	38	35	—	—	MC: Gold
Anthology Box Set	Released: 16 November 2010; Label: Apple, EMI	—	—	—	—	—	—	—	—	—	—	
Help!	Released: 2011 (US); Label: Capitol Records, Apple Records; limited edition came with a 45 and a S/M or L/XL T-shirt	—	—	—	—	—	—	—	—	—	—	
Can't Buy Me Love	Released: 2011 (US); Label: Capitol Records, Apple Records; limited edition came with a 45 and a L/XL T-shirt	—	—	—	—	—	—	—	—	—	—	
Hello, Goodbye	Released: 2011 (US); Label: Capitol Records, Apple Records; limited edition came with a 45 and a L/XL T-shirt	—	—	—	—	—	—	—	—	—	—	
Let It Be	Released: 2011 (US); Label: Capitol Records, Apple Records; limited edition came with a 45 and a L/XL T-shirt	—	—	—	—	—	—	—	—	—	—	
Live at the BBC: The Collection	Released: 11 November 2013; Label: Apple, UM^{e}	—	—	—	—	—	—	—	—	—	—	
The U.S. Albums	Released: 21 January 2014; Label: Apple, Capitol, UM^{e}	—	—	—	—	—	29	—	—	—	48	
The Japan Box	Released: 25 June 2014; Label: Apple, UM^{e}	—	—	—	—	—	83	—	—	—	—	
Sgt. Pepper's Lonely Hearts Club Band: 50th Anniversary Edition	Released: 26 May 2017; Label: Apple Records	1	3	5	7	—	5	9	4	2	3	
The Christmas Records	Released: 15 December 2017; Label: Apple, UM^{e}	—	—	—	—	—	—	—	—	—	—	
The Beatles: 50th Anniversary Edition	Released: 9 November 2018; Label: Apple Records	4	—	—	9	—	3	—	—	1	6	
The Singles Collection Box	Released: 22 November 2019; Label: Apple, UM	—	—	—	—	—	—	—	—	—	—	
Abbey Road: 50th Anniversary Edition	Released: 27 September 2019; Label: Apple Records, Capitol Records, UMe; compact disc, vinyl; limited edition vinyl box set came with an LG white T-shirt	1	—	2	3	—	2	2	6	4	3	
Let It Be: Special Edition	Released: 15 October 2021; Label: Apple Records	2	—	2	8	—	3	—	5	—	5	
Revolver: Special Edition	Released: 28 October 2022; Label: Apple Records	2	2	2	6	—	—	6	2	4	4	
The Beatles: 1964 U.S. Albums in Mono	Released: 22 November 2024; Label: Apple, UM	—	—	—	—	—	—	—	—	—	—	
Anthology Collection	Released: 21 November 2025; Label: Apple	29	32	13	—	—	—	—	—	—	113	
Rubber Soul: Special Edition	Scheduled: 2 October 2026; Label: Apple	To be released										
"—" denotes that the recording did not chart or was not released in that territory.

== Extended plays ==
List of EPs, with selected chart positions
Title	EP details	Peak chart positions		
Title	EP details	UK	AUS	US
My Bonnie (with Tony Sheridan)	Released: 12 July 1963 (UK); Label: Polydor	—	—	—
Twist and Shout	Released: 12 July 1963 (UK); Label: Parlophone	1	5	—
The Beatles' Hits	Released: 6 September 1963 (UK); Label: Parlophone	1	52	—
The Beatles (No. 1)	Released: 1 November 1963 (UK); Label: Parlophone	2	79	—
All My Loving	Released: 7 February 1964 (UK); Label: Parlophone	1	1	—
Souvenir of Their Visit to America	Released: 23 March 1964 (US); Label: Vee-Jay	—	—	—
Four by the Beatles	Released: 11 May 1964 (US); Label: Capitol	—	—	92
Requests	Released: 18 June 1964 (Australia/New Zealand); Label: Parlophone	—	1	—
Long Tall Sally	Released: 19 June 1964 (UK); Label: Parlophone	1	—	—
The Beatles Again!	Released: July 1964 (New Zealand); Label: Parlophone	—	—	—
A Hard Day's Night No. 1	Released: July 1964 (New Zealand); Label: Parlophone	—	—	—
The Beatles No. 2	Released: July 1964 (New Zealand); Label: Parlophone	—	—	—
More Requests	Released: 20 August 1964 (Australia); Label: Parlophone	—	7	—
Extracts from the Film A Hard Day's Night	Released: 4 November 1964 (UK); Label: Parlophone	1	—	—
Extracts from the Album A Hard Day's Night	Released: 6 November 1964 (UK); Label: Parlophone	8	—	—
4 by the Beatles	Released: 1 February 1965 (US); Label: Capitol	—	—	68
Beatles for Sale	Released: 6 April 1965 (UK); Label: Parlophone	1	84	—
Beatles for Sale No. 2	Released: 4 June 1965 (UK); Label: Parlophone	5	—	—
The Beatles' Million Sellers	Released: 6 December 1965 (UK); Label: Parlophone	1	—	—
Yesterday	Released: 4 March 1966 (UK); Label: Parlophone	1	—	—
Nowhere Man	Released: 8 July 1966 (UK); Label: Parlophone	4	—	—
Magical Mystery Tour	Released: 8 December 1967 (UK); Label: Parlophone	2	3	—
Yellow Submarine (Cancelled)	Unreleased (Planned 1968); Label: Apple; Track Listing: Only A Northern Song, Hey Bulldog, Across The Universe, All Together Now & All Too Much	-	-	-
Spooky Songs	Released: 30 October 2020; Label: UMG Recordings; Digital release only	—	—	—
The Beatles for Kids – Morning, Afternoon & Night	Released: 13 November 2020; Label: UMG Recordings; Digital release only	—	—	—
Got to Get You Into My Life	Released: 27 November 2020; Label: UMG Recordings; Digital release only	—	—	—
Meditation Mix	Released: 4 December 2020; Label: UMG Recordings; Digital release only	—	—	—
Study Songs Vol. 1	Released: 11 December 2020; Label: UMG Recordings; Digital release only	—	—	—
Study Songs Vol. 2	Released: 18 December 2020; Label: UMG Recordings; Digital release only	—	—	—
At Home with the Beatles	Released: 25 December 2020; Label: UMG Recordings; Digital release only	—	—	—
Getting Better All the Time	Released: 1 January 2021; Label: UMG Recordings; Digital release only	—	—	—
We Can Work It Out	Released: 8 January 2021; Label: UMG Recordings; Digital release only	—	—	—
New Year's Workout	Released: 22 January 2021; Label: UMG Recordings; Digital release only	—	—	—
The Beatles for Kids – Colours	Released: 29 January 2021; Label: UMG Recordings; Digital release only	—	—	—
All About the Girl	Released: 5 February 2021; Label: UMG Recordings; Digital release only	—	—	—
The Beatles (Love Me Do)	Released: 12 February 2021; Label: UMG Recordings; Digital release only	—	—	—
The Beatles for Kids – Animals	Released: 19 February 2021; Label: UMG Recordings; Digital release only	—	—	—
The Beatles – Inspirations	Released: 12 March 2021; Label: UMG Recordings; Digital release only	—	—	—
"—" denotes that the recording did not chart or was not released in that territory.

== Flexi discs ==
The Beatles released seven consecutive Christmas records on flexi disc for members of their UK and US fan clubs, from 1963 to 1969, ranging in length between 3:58 and 7:48. These short collections had a mix of spoken and musical messages for their official fan clubs.

== See also ==
- The Beatles singles discography
- The Beatles videography
- Outline of the Beatles
- The Beatles timeline
- Apple Records discography, the albums and singles of the Beatles' record label, many of which had involvement by members of the Beatles
- The Beatles bootleg recordings
- The Beatles' recording sessions
- List of songs recorded by the Beatles
- The Beatles Tapes from the David Wigg Interviews, a collection of interviews with the band

== Sources ==
- Everett, Walter (1999). The Beatles as Musicians: Revolver through the Anthology. New York: Oxford University Press. ISBN 978-0-19-512941-0.
- Lewisohn, Mark (1988). The Beatles Recording Sessions. New York: Harmony Books. ISBN 0-517-57066-1.
- Lewisohn, Mark (2000). The Complete Beatles Chronicle: The Only Definitive Guide to the Beatles' Entire Career. London: Hamlyn. ISBN 0-600-60033-5.
- Miles, Barry (2001). The Beatles Diary Volume 1: The Beatles Years. London: Omnibus Press. ISBN 978-0-7119-8308-3.
- Penman, Ross (2009). The Beatles in New Zealand ... a Discography. R. Penman. ISBN 978-0-473-15155-3.
- Russell, Jeff (2005). The Beatles Album File & Complete Discography. Cassell Illustrated. ISBN 1844034356.
- Spizer, Bruce (2004). The Beatles Are Coming! The Birth of Beatlemania in America. New Orleans: 498 Productions. ISBN 0-9662649-9-1.
