= The Beatles EP Collection =

Box set by the Beatles
- Released: 7 December 1981
- Genres: Rock; pop
- Label: Parlophone
- Producer: George Martin

The Beatles chronology
The Beatles Box (1980)	The Beatles EP Collection (1981)	Reel Music (1982)

The Beatles EP Collection is a box set of vinyl records by the English rock band the Beatles. It was released by EMI's Parlophone record label in the United Kingdom on 7 December 1981. The box set consists of thirteen of the band's extended play (EP) releases from 1963 to 1967, including the double EP Magical Mystery Tour, and a new disc, titled The Beatles, which compiled previously unavailable stereo mixes of four songs. Released with the Parlophone catalogue number BEP 14, the box set was the third in a series of format-based sets in the UK, after The Singles Collection 1962–1970 (1976) and The Beatles Collection (1978).

As with the 1978 collection, the set is packaged in a dark blue box, with gold lettering used for the compilation title and the four band members' signatures. All of the 1960s EPs are presented in their original sleeve designs, while The Beatles uses the artwork from the band's 1967 double A-side single "Strawberry Fields Forever" / "Penny Lane".

The four songs on the new EP (Parlophone SGE 1) are "The Inner Light", "Baby, You're a Rich Man", "She's a Woman" and "This Boy". In the case of "Baby, You're a Rich Man", the EP served as the debut UK release for the true stereo version of the track, which had previously been available only in mono or duophonic ("mock stereo") sound. Due to an error in the manufacturing process for The Beatles EP Collection, "This Boy" was originally issued in mono.

== Box-set contents ==
Disc numbers and titles per Kenneth Womack's The Beatles Encyclopedia.

Disc no.	EP title	Original release
1	The Beatles' Hits	6 September 1963
2	Twist and Shout	12 July 1963
3	The Beatles No. 1	1 November 1963
4	All My Loving	7 February 1964
5	Long Tall Sally	19 June 1964
6	A Hard Day's Night: Extracts from the Album	6 November 1964
7	A Hard Day's Night: Extracts from the Film	4 November 1964
8	Beatles for Sale	6 April 1965
9	Beatles for Sale No. 2	4 June 1965
10	The Beatles' Million Sellers	6 December 1965
11	Yesterday	4 March 1966
12	Nowhere Man	8 July 1966
13 & 14	Magical Mystery Tour	8 December 1967
15	The Beatles	7 December 1981

== See also ==
- Outline of the Beatles
- The Beatles timeline
