= The Beatles Box Set =

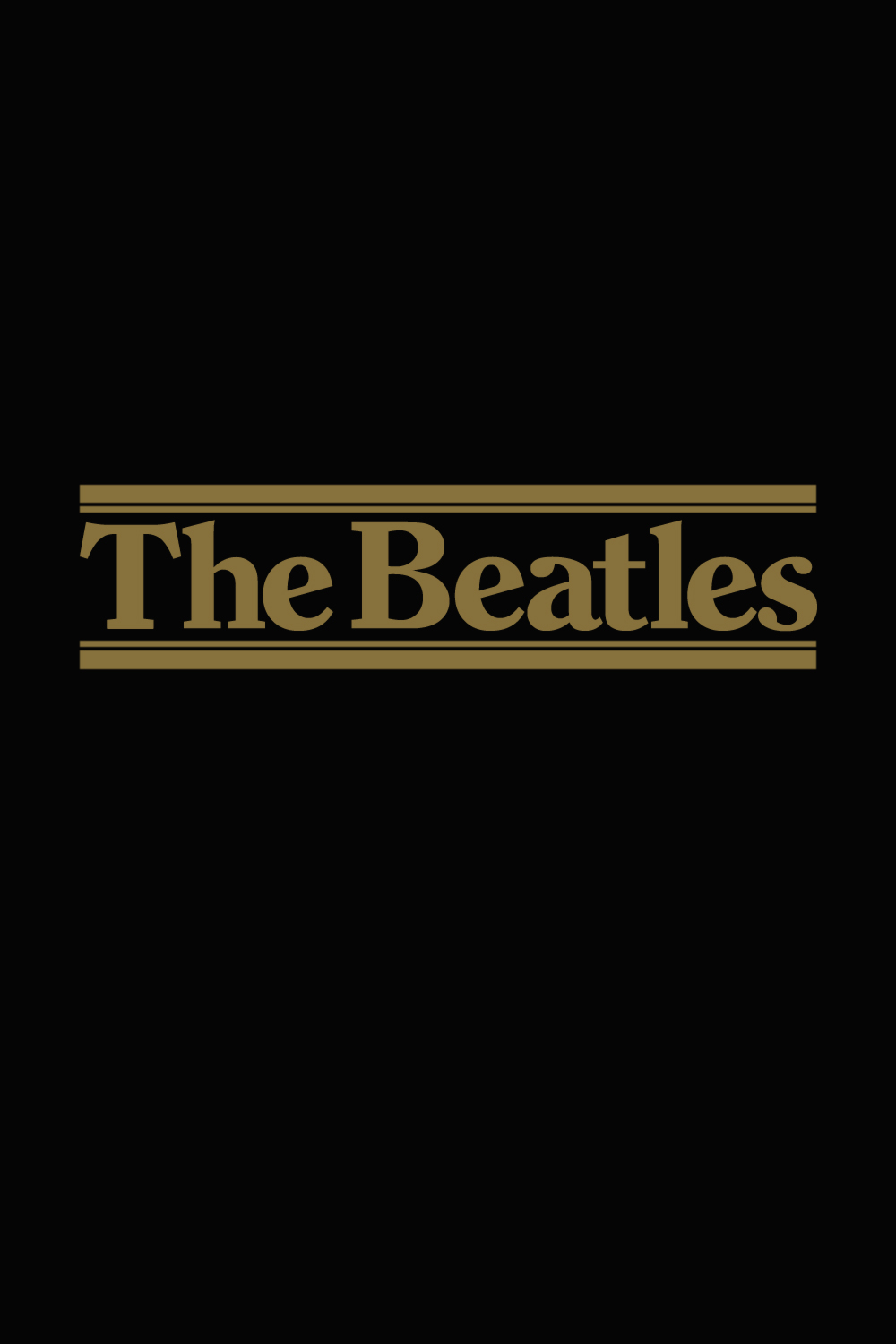

Box set by the Beatles
- Released: 15 November 1988
- Recorded: 4 September 1962 – 1 April 1970, primarily at Abbey Road Studios, London
- Genre: Rock
- Length: 9:22:46
- Label: Parlophone/Capitol/Apple
- Producers: George Martin, Phil Spector (Let It Be)

The Beatles chronology
Past Masters (1988)	The Beatles Box Set (1988)	Live at the BBC (1994)

Professional ratings
Review scores
Source	Rating
AllMusic	2/5 stars

The Beatles Box Set is a sixteen-disc box set compiling the entire recorded works of the Beatles as issued by the band between 1962 and 1970. It was released on 15 November 1988 in Britain and America, with the same catalogue number (Apple BBX2-91302) in each of those countries. While available also in vinyl LP and cassette formats, the box set was the first complete collection of original Beatles material to be released by EMI and Capitol Records on compact disc.

The Beatles Box Set included all of the original UK album releases by the band, together with the 1967 US album Magical Mystery Tour. The latter had been issued in the UK in November 1976, at which point the LP version superseded the original British EP of the same name. The box also contained the 1988 compilations Past Masters: Volume One and Past Masters: Volume Two, which grouped together singles, B-sides, EP tracks, and foreign releases not found on the band's UK studio albums. Although all these albums had been previously available in stereo on both LP and cassette, the versions of the first four albums included in The Beatles Box Set were the digitally remastered mono mixes issued on CD over 1987–88, which caused a considerable furor among Beatles fans and audiophiles.

The collection was encased in a black oak roll-top box and included a soft-cover book with commentary on the songs by Beatles recording historian Mark Lewisohn. The set was also issued in a black vinyl covered cardboard box in Japan. Although The Beatles Box Set failed to chart in either the UK or the US, it was certified platinum by the Recording Industry Association of America.

A new Stereo Box, containing remastered versions of the Beatles' core albums and Past Masters, was released on 9 September 2009 along with The Beatles in Mono and new stereo reissues of the individual albums, including the first four albums given their stereo debuts on CD.

== Album listing ==
Album	Label		Release date	
Album	UK	US	UK	US
Please Please Me	Parlophone	Parlophone/Capitol	22 March 1963	26 February 1987
With the Beatles	Parlophone	Parlophone/Capitol	22 November 1963	26 February 1987
A Hard Day's Night	Parlophone	Parlophone/Capitol	10 July 1964	26 February 1987
Beatles for Sale	Parlophone	Parlophone/Capitol	4 December 1964	26 February 1987
Help!	Parlophone	Parlophone/Capitol	6 August 1965	30 April 1987
Rubber Soul	Parlophone	Parlophone/Capitol	3 December 1965	30 April 1987
Revolver	Parlophone	Parlophone/Capitol	5 August 1966	30 April 1987
Sgt. Pepper's Lonely Hearts Club Band	Parlophone	Capitol	1 June 1967	2 June 1967
Magical Mystery Tour	Parlophone	Capitol	19 November 1967	26 November 1967
The Beatles (2 CDs)	Parlophone	Capitol	22 November 1968	25 November 1968
Yellow Submarine	Parlophone	Capitol	17 January 1969	13 January 1969
Abbey Road	Parlophone	Capitol	26 September 1969	1 October 1969
Let It Be	Parlophone	Capitol	8 May 1970	18 May 1970
Past Masters, Volume One	Parlophone	Parlophone/Capitol	7 March 1988	8 March 1988
Past Masters, Volume Two	Parlophone	Parlophone/Capitol	7 March 1988	8 March 1988

== See also ==
- The Beatles Collection
- The Beatles Box
- The Beatles: The Collection
- The Beatles Mono Collection
- The Beatles (The Original Studio Recordings)
- The Beatles in Mono
- Outline of the Beatles
- The Beatles timeline
