= The Beatles Box =

Box set by the Beatles
- Released: 3 November 1980
- Recorded: 1962–1970
- Studios: Abbey Road Studios, London; Olympic Studios, London; Trident Studios, London; Apple Studios, London; Regent Sound Studios, London; Pathe Marconi Studios, Paris; Chappell Studios, London
- Genre: Rock
- Length: 329:31
- Label: Parlophone: World Records (SM 701-8)
- Producers: Bryan Tyrrell and June Pengelly (Co-ordinators)
- Compiler: Simon Sinclair

The Beatles chronology
The Beatles Ballads (1980)	The Beatles Box (1980)	The Beatles EP Collection (1981)

The Beatles Box is an eight-record box set of Beatles recordings, initially released on 3 November 1980 by World Records, a mail-order subsidiary of EMI. It was also issued in two formats by Reader's Digest in New Zealand, Australia and Mexico.

This was the last Beatles release issued during John Lennon's lifetime before his murder the following month.

== Track listing ==
All songs composed by John Lennon and Paul McCartney except where noted

=== Record 1 ===
Side one

1. "Love Me Do" (original UK single with Ringo Starr on drums)
2. "P.S. I Love You" (mock stereo remix from Please Please Me)
3. "I Saw Her Standing There"
4. "Please Please Me"
5. "Misery"
6. "Do You Want to Know a Secret"
7. "A Taste of Honey" (Bobby Scott and Ric Marlow)
8. "Twist and Shout" (Phil Medley, Bert Russell)

Side two

1. "From Me to You"
2. "Thank You Girl" (mono)
3. "She Loves You" (mock stereo remix from A Collection of Beatles Oldies)
4. "It Won't Be Long"
5. "Please Mr. Postman" (Georgia Dobbins, William Garrett, Freddie Gorman, Brian Holland, Robert Bateman)
6. "All My Loving" (hi-hat intro)
7. "Roll Over Beethoven" (Chuck Berry)
8. "Money (That's What I Want)" (Janie Bradford, Berry Gordy)

=== Record 2 ===
Side one

1. "I Want to Hold Your Hand"
2. "This Boy" (mono)
3. "Can't Buy Me Love"
4. "You Can't Do That"
5. "A Hard Day's Night"
6. "I Should Have Known Better"
7. "If I Fell"
8. "And I Love Her" (from US Rarities LP) (alternate version with six-bar ending; originally issued in Germany)

Side two

1. "Things We Said Today"
2. "I'll Be Back"
3. "Long Tall Sally" (stereo) (Enotris Johnson, Richard Penniman, Robert Blackwell)
4. "I Call Your Name" (stereo)
5. "Matchbox" (stereo) (Carl Perkins)
6. "Slow Down" (stereo) (Larry Williams)
7. "She's a Woman" (stereo)
8. "I Feel Fine" ("whisper" version, first issued on the UK version of 1962–1966)

=== Record 3 ===
Side one

1. "Eight Days a Week"
2. "No Reply"
3. "I'm a Loser"
4. "I'll Follow the Sun"
5. "Mr. Moonlight" (Roy Lee Johnson)
6. "Every Little Thing"
7. "I Don't Want to Spoil the Party"
8. "Kansas City"/"Hey-Hey-Hey-Hey!" (Jerry Leiber and Mike Stoller / Richard Penniman)

Side two

1. "Ticket to Ride"
2. "I'm Down" (stereo)
3. "Help!"
4. "The Night Before"
5. "You've Got to Hide Your Love Away"
6. "I Need You" (George Harrison)
7. "Another Girl"
8. "You're Going to Lose That Girl"

=== Record 4 ===
Side one

1. "Yesterday"
2. "Act Naturally" (Johnny Russell, Voni Morrison)
3. "Tell Me What You See"
4. "It's Only Love"
5. "You Like Me Too Much" (George Harrison)
6. "I've Just Seen a Face"
7. "Day Tripper" (US Yesterday and Today mix)
8. "We Can Work It Out"

Side two

1. "Michelle"
2. "Drive My Car"
3. "Norwegian Wood (This Bird Has Flown)"
4. "You Won't See Me"
5. "Nowhere Man"
6. "Girl"
7. "I'm Looking Through You"
8. "In My Life"

=== Record 5 ===
Side one

1. "Paperback Writer" (US Hey Jude stereo version)
2. "Rain"
3. "Here, There and Everywhere"
4. "Taxman" (George Harrison)
5. "I'm Only Sleeping" (US Yesterday and Today stereo version)
6. "Good Day Sunshine"
7. "Yellow Submarine"

Side two

1. "Eleanor Rigby"
2. "And Your Bird Can Sing" (US Yesterday and Today stereo version)
3. "For No One"
4. "Doctor Robert"
5. "Got to Get You into My Life"
6. "Penny Lane" (US Rarities edit)
7. "Strawberry Fields Forever"

=== Record 6 ===
Side one

1. "Sgt. Pepper's Lonely Hearts Club Band"
2. "With a Little Help from My Friends"
3. "Lucy in the Sky with Diamonds"
4. "Fixing a Hole"
5. "She's Leaving Home"
6. "Being for the Benefit of Mr. Kite!"
7. "A Day in the Life" (edited version from 1967–1970)

Side two

1. "When I'm Sixty-Four"
2. "Lovely Rita"
3. "All You Need Is Love" (mono)
4. "Baby, You're a Rich Man" (German Magical Mystery Tour stereo)
5. "Magical Mystery Tour"
6. "Your Mother Should Know"
7. "The Fool on the Hill"
8. "I Am the Walrus" (US Rarities composite)

=== Record 7 ===
Side one

1. "Hello, Goodbye"
2. "Lady Madonna"
3. "Hey Jude"
4. "Revolution"
5. "Back in the U.S.S.R."
6. "Ob-La-Di, Ob-La-Da"
7. "While My Guitar Gently Weeps" (George Harrison)

Side two

1. "The Continuing Story of Bungalow Bill" (minus the opening flamenco guitar intro)
2. "Happiness Is a Warm Gun"
3. "Martha My Dear"
4. "I'm So Tired"
5. "Piggies" (George Harrison)
6. "Don't Pass Me By" (Richard Starkey)
7. "Julia"
8. "All Together Now"

=== Record 8 ===
Side one

1. "Get Back" (LP version)
2. "Don't Let Me Down"
3. "The Ballad of John and Yoko"
4. "Across the Universe"
5. "For You Blue" (George Harrison)
6. "Two of Us"
7. "The Long and Winding Road"
8. "Let It Be" (LP version)

Side two

1. "Come Together"
2. "Something" (George Harrison)
3. "Maxwell's Silver Hammer"
4. "Octopus's Garden" (Richard Starkey)
5. "Here Comes the Sun" (George Harrison)
6. "Because"
7. "Golden Slumbers"
8. "Carry That Weight"
9. "The End"
10. "Her Majesty" (preceding pause shortened from 15 seconds)

== See also ==
- The Beatles Collection
- The Beatles: The Collection
- The Beatles Mono Collection
- The Beatles Box Set
- The Beatles (The Original Studio Recordings)
- The Beatles in Mono
- Outline of the Beatles
- The Beatles timeline
