= The Beatles: The Collection =

- 14 LP Collection

Box set by the Beatles
- Released: 1 October 1982
- Recorded: 1962–1970 at EMI, Trident, Olympic, De Lane Lea, Regent Sound and Apple studios, London and Pathé Marconi Studio, Paris
- Genres: Rock, Pop
- Label: Mobile Fidelity Sound Lab
- Producers: George Martin; Phil Spector

The Beatles chronology
Reel Music (1982)	The Beatles: The Collection (1982)	The Beatles Mono Collection (1982)

Contents

The Beatles: The Collection was a vinyl boxed set of every Beatles album remastered at half speed from the original stereo master recordings, except for Magical Mystery Tour which was mastered from Capitol Records' submasters with the last three tracks in rechanneled stereo.

== Release ==
Released with much anticipation in early October 1982, The Collection was lauded by critics and Beatles fans worldwide for the superb sound, and sold-out completely within the first year. Mobile Fidelity Sound Lab (MFSL) pressed a second run of the Beatles Boxed Set for a total production run of 25,000 over the next two years or until October 1985.

Each album was pressed on black vinyl by the Victor Company of Japan. The album covers were replaced with photographs of tape boxes and log sheet. The original album covers were included in a booklet which also featured a certificate of authenticity as this was a limited edition collection. Missing from this collection were all of the Beatles' singles, extended play and a few miscellaneous tracks that did not appear on their original UK albums.

== Contents ==
1. Please Please Me – MFSL1-101
2. With the Beatles – MFSL1-102
3. A Hard Day's Night – MFSL1-103
4. Beatles for Sale – MFSL1-104
5. Help! – MFSL1-105
6. Rubber Soul – MFSL1-106
7. Revolver – MFSL1-107
8. Sgt. Pepper's Lonely Hearts Club Band – MFSL1-100
9. Magical Mystery Tour – MFSL1-047
10. The Beatles – MFSL2-072 (2 LPs)
11. Yellow Submarine – MFSL1-108
12. Abbey Road – MFSL1-023
13. Let It Be – MFSL1-109

== See also ==
- The Beatles Collection
- The Beatles Box
- The Beatles Mono Collection
- The Beatles Boxed Set
- The Beatles (The Original Studio Recordings)
- The Beatles in Mono
- Outline of the Beatles
- The Beatles timeline
