= The Beatles Collection =

Box set by the Beatles
- Released: 2 November 1978 (US); 12 December 1978 (UK)
- Recorded: 11 September 1962 – 1 April 1970, EMI, Trident, Olympic and Apple studios, London; Pathé Marconi Studio, Paris; EMI Studios, Bombay
- Genre: Rock
- Length: 533:40
- Label: Parlophone
- Producers: George Martin, Phil Spector (Let It Be)

The Beatles British chronology
Love Songs (1977)	The Beatles Collection (1978)	Rarities (1978)

The Beatles American chronology
Love Songs (1977)	The Beatles Collection (1978)	Rarities (1980)

Professional ratings
Review scores
Source	Rating
AllMusic	4.5/5 stars

The Beatles Collection is a box set of the Beatles' vinyl albums released in the United States in November 1978 and the following month in the United Kingdom. It contains the official catalogue of the Beatles in stereo, and a new compilation called Rarities.

The American issue by Capitol Records contained the British pressings of the same 12 original albums, with the American pressing of Rarities. The latter differed from its British counterpart in that it included the previously released English-language versions of "She Loves You" and "I Want to Hold Your Hand", rather than the German-language version found on the British Rarities compilation. The American edition of the box set was a limited edition of only 3000 numbered copies. The limited availability of the American release resulted in the British release becoming popular as an import into the US.

There is also a rare EMI New Zealand version which combines the British box with some elements of the American version, such as the US custom liner on a gatefold Rarities.

== Contents ==
The Beatles Collection did not include a number of Beatles recordings, including those released on the Magical Mystery Tour album. This album had been released in the United States in 1967, but it was not counted among the group's official catalogue because it was not issued in the United Kingdom until 1976. The collection also omitted the non-album singles that had previously been released in 1973 on the twin compilation packages 1962–1966 and 1967–1970.

The collection also includes the inserts contained in the individual albums, such as the cardboard cutout sheet in Sgt. Pepper's Lonely Hearts Club Band and the photos and poster in The Beatles.

A company specializing in audiophile vinyl pressings, Mobile Fidelity Sound Lab, released a similar box set in 1982 called The Beatles: The Collection. This set consisted of the 12 British albums – Rarities was not included, but Magical Mystery Tour was – pressed off the original Abbey Road studio master tapes (except for MMT), using a technique called "Half Speed Mastering", and onto Japanese "virgin" vinyl. The set was highly acclaimed for its sonic accuracy and only approximately 25,000 were released. In this case, the actual covers for each album was a photo of a studio master tape, along with the engineer's log sheet. The original album covers were compiled in an LP-size booklet.

== Album listing ==
Album	Label	Release date
Please Please Me	Parlophone Records PCS 3042	22 March 1963
With the Beatles	Parlophone Records PCS 3045	22 November 1963
A Hard Day's Night	Parlophone Records PCS 3058	10 July 1964
Beatles for Sale	Parlophone Records PCS 3062	4 December 1964
Help!	Parlophone Records PCS 3071	6 August 1965
Rubber Soul	Parlophone Records PCS 3075	3 December 1965
Revolver	Parlophone Records PCS 7009	5 August 1966
Sgt. Pepper's Lonely Hearts Club Band	Parlophone Records PCS 7027	26 May 1967
The Beatles ("White Album")	Apple Records PCS 7067/8	22 November 1968
Yellow Submarine	Apple Records PCS 7070	17 January 1969
Abbey Road	Apple Records PCS 7088	26 September 1969
Let It Be	Apple Records PCS 7096	8 May 1970
Rarities	Parlophone Records PSLP 261 (British editions) Capitol SPRO-8969 (US editions)	2 December 1978

== See also ==
- The Beatles Box
- The Beatles: The Collection
- The Beatles Mono Collection
- The Beatles Box Set
- The Beatles (The Original Studio Recordings)
- The Beatles in Mono
- The U.S. Albums
- Outline of the Beatles
- The Beatles timeline
