= The Essential Beatles =

Compilation album by the Beatles
- Released: 2 February 1972
- Recorded: 1962–1969, EMI and Apple studios, London
- Genre: Rock and roll
- Language: English
- Label: Apple
- Producers: George Martin and Phil Spector

The Beatles Australian chronology
Let It Be (1970)	The Essential Beatles (1972)	The Beatles' Australian 10th Anniversary 1963-1973 Souvenir Presentation The Beatles Greatest Hits Volumes 1 and 2 (1973)

The Essential Beatles is a greatest hits compilation album by the Beatles which was exclusive to Australia and New Zealand on the Apple Records label. All of the songs featured on the album (with the exception of "With a Little Help from My Friends") reached the top 3 in the Australian charts as singles and EP tracks.

Most of the songs on the album are presented in true stereo, while "Love Me Do", "P.S. I Love You" and "Baby You're A Rich Man" are in "fake stereo". Two notable mastering glitches appear on the album: "Penny Lane" running slow with a noticeable "warble" and "Long Tall Sally" on this album, has the stereo channels reversed.

The album was reissued twice in the 1980s. The first time as part of the Superstars of the '70s box set, released by the Australian branch of World Record Club in August 1980. The second being in December 1982, where it was paired with the Barry Miles book The Beatles In Their Own Words in a box set titled: The Beatles Sight & Sound.

The album was issued on cassette in 1972, but has never seen a compact disc release (as was the case with non-canon Beatles albums at the time). It remained in print until 1991, when all the Australian Beatles vinyl was deleted from EMI Music Australia catalogue and replaced with imported vinyl from the UK.

== Track listing ==
All tracks are written by Lennon–McCartney except as noted.

Side one:
No.	Title	Notes on mix variations	Length
1.	"Love Me Do"	Fake stereo mix created from mono Please Please Me version	2:22
2.	"Boys" (Luther Dixon and Wes Farrell)	Stereo mix from Please Please Me	2:28
3.	"Long Tall Sally" (Enotris Johnson, Robert Blackwell, Richard Penniman)	Stereo mix. The left and right channels are reversed from the original stereo mix . First released on The Beatles' Second Album (except without the echo added by Dave Dexter Jr.) and the Australian and New Zealand only release, Greatest Hits Volume 1.	2:04
4.	"Honey Don't" (Carl Perkins)	Stereo mix from the album Beatles For Sale	3:00
5.	"P.S. I Love You"	Mono single mix in fake stereo	2:05
6.	"Baby, You're a Rich Man"	Mono single and album mix in fake stereo	3:10
7.	"All My Loving"	Stereo mix from the With the Beatles album	2:10
8.	"Yesterday"	The original 1965 stereo mix from the Help! album	2:07
9.	"Penny Lane"	New stereo mix. First featured on the German 1971 release of Magical Mystery Tour. The version on The Essential Beatles runs slower and has a noticeable tape "warble"	3:05

Side two:
No.	Title	Notes on mix variations	Length
1.	"Magical Mystery Tour"	Stereo mix from the Magical Mystery Tour album.	2:50
2.	"Norwegian Wood (This Bird Has Flown)"	The original 1965 mix from the stereo Rubber Soul album with reversed channels.	2:04
3.	"With a Little Help from My Friends"	Stereo mix from Sgt. Pepper's Lonely Hearts Club Band.	2:40
4.	"All You Need Is Love"	Stereo mix first appearing on the Magical Mystery Tour album	3:03
5.	"Something" (George Harrison)	From the Abbey Road album	3:05
6.	"Ob-La-Di, Ob-La-Da"	From The Beatles album	3:10
7.	"Let It Be"	The album version from the Let It Be album	4:03

== Sales charts and certification ==
=== Australian Charts ===
Chart	Peak Position
Kent Report Albums	10
Go-Set Top 20 Albums	6
