= The Beatles Ballads =

Compilation album by the Beatles
- Released: 20 October 1980
- Recorded: 1963–1970 at EMI, Trident and Apple studios, London
- Genre: Rock
- Length: 59:00
- Label: Parlophone
- Producers: George Martin and Phil Spector

The Beatles British chronology
Rarities (1978)	The Beatles Ballads (1980)	The Beatles Box (1980)

The Beatles Ballads is a compilation album featuring a selection of ballad songs by the English rock band the Beatles. The album was not released in the United States, but was in Mexico, the United Kingdom, Canada, New Zealand, Germany, Italy, Spain, India, Japan, South Korea, and Australia. In Australia, the album was a big success, spending seven weeks at number one. It reached number 17 in the UK.

The cover art by "Patrick" (John Byrne) is often incorrectly cited as being made as a potential album cover for The Beatles ("The White Album"); however, it was originally created for Alan Aldridge's The Beatles Illustrated Lyrics.

The album was released in 1985 on LP and cassette under the EMI-ODEON label in Brazil using identical front and back cover art. It has never been officially released on compact disc.

== Track listing ==
All songs written by Lennon–McCartney, except where indicated.

Despite a running time of almost one hour, the vinyl edition of this release has only ever been available as a single LP, rather than as a double set as sometimes presumed. "Norwegian Wood (This Bird Has Flown)" is the 1977 mix first used on the Love Songs compilation. The rest of the songs appear in their original stereo mixes, although four of these - "Yesterday", "You've Got to Hide Your Love Away", "She's Leaving Home" and "Here, There and Everywhere" - had the left and right channels reversed, as on Love Songs. In South Korea, "Norwegian Wood" was censored until 1993, so it was replaced with "Girl".

Side one

1. "Yesterday" (lead singer: Paul McCartney)
2. "Norwegian Wood (This Bird Has Flown)" (lead singer: John Lennon)
3. "Do You Want to Know a Secret" (lead singer: George Harrison)
4. "For No One" (lead singer: Paul McCartney)
5. "Michelle" (lead singer: Paul McCartney)
6. "Nowhere Man" (lead singer: John Lennon)
7. "You've Got to Hide Your Love Away" (lead singer: John Lennon)
8. "Across the Universe" ("Wildlife" version from a British various artists charity album titled No One's Gonna Change Our World) (lead singer: John Lennon)
9. "All My Loving" (lead singer: Paul McCartney)
10. "Hey Jude" (lead singer: Paul McCartney)

Side two

1. "Something" (George Harrison) (lead singer: George Harrison)
2. "The Fool on the Hill" (lead singer: Paul McCartney)
3. "Till There Was You" (Meredith Willson) (lead singer: Paul McCartney)
4. "The Long and Winding Road" (lead singer: Paul McCartney)
5. "Here Comes the Sun" (Harrison) (lead singer: George Harrison)
6. "Blackbird" (lead singer: Paul McCartney)
7. "And I Love Her" (lead singer: Paul McCartney)
8. "She's Leaving Home" (lead singer: Paul McCartney, John Lennon)
9. "Here, There and Everywhere" (lead singer: Paul McCartney)
10. "Let It Be" (Single version) (lead singer: Paul McCartney)

== Charts ==
=== Charts ===
Chart (1980)	Peak position
Australia (Kent Music Report)	1
Canada Top Albums/CDs (RPM)	69
New Zealand Albums (RMNZ)	2
UK Albums (Official Charts)	17

== Certifications ==
Region	Certification	Certified units/sales
Australia	—	250,000
Canada (Music Canada)	Gold	50,000^{^}
Hong Kong (IFPI Hong Kong)	Gold	10,000^{*}
New Zealand (RMNZ)	Platinum	15,000^{^}
United Kingdom (BPI)	Gold	100,000^{^}
^{*} Sales figures based on certification alone.^{^} Shipments figures based on certification alone.
