= Dig It (Beatles song) =

- Cover of the song's sheet music

Song by the Beatles

from the album Let It Be
- Released: 8 May 1970
- Recorded: 26 January 1969
- Studio: Apple, London
- Genre: Rock
- Length: 0:51 (Let It Be version); 4:10 (Get Back mix); 8:20 (Full version); 15:05 (Jam)
- Label: Apple, EMI
- Songwriter: Lennon/McCartney/Harrison/Starkey
- Producer: Phil Spector

"Dig It" is a song by the English rock band the Beatles from their 1970 album Let It Be. The song is credited to Lennon/McCartney/Harrison/Starkey, and is one of the few songs to be credited to all of the Beatles. This song and the 39-second "Maggie Mae" appear on the Let It Be album, but are excluded from the Let It Be... Naked album, instead being replaced with "Don't Let Me Down". Glyn Johns' May 1969 version of the album, then titled Get Back, had a four-minute excerpt of "Dig It", which was later reduced to the much shorter version in the final album.

== Recording ==
Several versions were recorded during the Get Back/Let It Be sessions, on 24, 26, 27, 28, and 29 January 1969, at Apple Studio. The 51-second version on the album is an extract taken from the 26 January version, which was a 15-minute jam that evolved from a loose "Like a Rolling Stone" jam. A segment of the jam session, 4 minutes and 30 seconds in length, appears in the documentary film Let It Be. The participants in that session are John Lennon on vocals and 6-string bass, George Harrison on guitar, Paul McCartney on piano, Ringo Starr on drums, George Martin on maracas and Billy Preston at the organ; also participating in the jam, but not heard on the released version, was Linda Eastman's six-year-old daughter Heather. Eastman later became McCartney's wife.

In the early part of the jam, Lennon sings the main lyric with interjections from Harrison. Heather adds wordless vocals, which in the 2021 miniseries The Beatles: Get Back, appear to be imitating Yoko Ono. As the performance winds down, Lennon exhorts the others to continue. McCartney adds a baritone backup vocal of "dig it up, dig it up, dig it up" and variations, and Lennon begins to repeat "Like a rolling stone", then, in free association manner, mentions "the FBI", "the CIA", "the BBC", "B.B. King", "Doris Day" and "Matt Busby".

The excerpt on the Let It Be album fades in on Lennon's second "Like a rolling stone" and concludes with Lennon speaking in a falsetto: "That was 'Can You Dig It?' by Georgie Wood, and now we'd like to do 'Hark, the Angels Come'". The second sentence of that line is cut off in Let It Be's film recording of the jam session. ("Wee Georgie Wood" was a 4 ft 9 in [1.45 m] music-hall performer and child star.) The interjection actually comes from a different improvised jam recorded on the 24th. The earlier jam was much different, described by Beatles bootleg scholars Doug Sulpy and Ray Schweighardt as "sounding like a cross between the traditional 'Sailor's Hornpipe' and a slowed down rendition of Neal Hefti's 'Batman', as played on slide guitar". An excerpt from this jam (entitled "Can You Dig It?") can be heard on the "Fly on the Wall" bonus disc to Let It Be... Naked.

== Critical reception and legacy ==
In his contemporary review of Let It Be for New Musical Express, Alan Smith described "Dig It" as "no more than a few seconds' of a smile-raising chant about a number of items from the FBI to Matt Busby", and deemed both it and "Maggie Mae" to act as "two bits of dressing" on the album. Retrospectively, AllMusic critic Rovi Staff deems both of the latter tracks to be filler, while Hot Press's Pat Carty writes that the Beatles "might have been having the craic" with both tracks, "but you probably won't be." Billboard describe the Let It Be version of "Dig It" as a "51-second studio vamp" that "finds Lennon spitting Dylan wordplay in Mick Jagger fashion over a keyboard-heavy groove", and praise it as "a nice bit of levity" before the seriousness of the subsequent track on the album, "Let It Be". Conversely, John Harris of The Observer describes the track as "pretty rubbishy".

In 2023, Bill Wyman of Vulture ranked it the second-worst Beatles song, writing that, "[as] Lennon himself put it, this is what you get when you're stoned all the time and don’t give a shit", and criticised it for being tuneless and without subject matter. The same year, NME also ranked it the second-worst, naming it "50 seconds of a far longer studio jam" and commenting that was only released "to exemplify the fact that The Beatles cut loose a lot during the Let It Be sessions. Now we've got seven-plus hours of Get Back, it's rendered superfluous." Also in 2023, Ultimate Classic Rock ranked it 201st best (29th worst), deeming the short album edit to be "barely a fart" compared to the fifteen-minute version. Earlier, they had included the track in their list of the worst Beatles songs, arguing that in being cut to less than a minute for the album, the result sounded as "slight and unfinished" as it actually was. In 2020, they ranked it 17th on their list of the "top 20 weirdest Beatles songs", with Nick DeRiso opining that, of all the unusual choices Spector made throughout Let It Be, the most egregious was "tacking on this unfocused gobbledygook, even in snippet form."

Kenneth Womack describes the full recording as "a free-form, improvisational rant of some 12 minutes" that, at one moment, features Lennon duetting with the six-year-old Heather Eastman, and quotes Peter Doggett as describing the jam as a "slice of late '60s hippie slang". The author Barry Miles writes: "A brief extract from an improvised three-chord jam session that ran to more than 12 minutes on tape, 'Dig It' was included on the album to boost its vérité credentials". Steve Hamelman includes "Dig It" and "Maggie Mae" among the "benchmarks of the record's poetics of improvisation", alongside the dialogue snatches heard between songs, adding that "Dig It" exemplifies Lennon's associative wordplay. 33 1/3 author Steve Matteo writes that despite being a "short throwaway", "Dig It" has "great charm and appeal". In his discussion of the album, Kevin Courrier describes "Dig It" as a "mock church sermon featuring Billy Preston's gospel organ pulsing through it like a hot wire", and added that Lennon's closing remark – "Now, we'd like to do 'Hark, the Angels Come'" – can be interpreted as a "dig" at the following song, McCartney's "Let It Be", opining: "If 'Dig It' is gospel parody, 'Let It Be' is the real thing."

== Personnel ==
- John Lennon – lead vocals, six-string bass (Fender Bass VI)
- Paul McCartney – vocals in full version, piano
- George Harrison – vocals in full version, lead guitar (Fender Telecaster)
- Ringo Starr – drums

Additional musicians

- Billy Preston – Hammond organ
- George Martin – shaker
- Heather McCartney – vocals in full version

Personnel per Ian MacDonald

== Cover versions ==
- In between 1990 and 1991 while preparing for the song Give In to Me, Michael Jackson sang an impromptu short version of the track. This recording appears on the Give In to Me work tape.
