= The Singles Collection 1962–1970 =

1976 compilation box set by The Beatles

- Cover of the box available with the full set of singles

Box set by the Beatles
- Released: 5 March 1976
- Recorded: 4 September 1962 – 4 January 1970
- Genres: Rock, pop
- Label: EMI

The Beatles chronology
1967–1970 (1973)	The Singles Collection 1962–1970 (1976)	Rock 'n' Roll Music (1976)

The Singles Collection 1962–1970 is a series of reissued singles by the English rock band the Beatles. It was released in Britain on 5 March 1976 by EMI, following the expiration of the Beatles' contract with the company in January, and close to six years after the band's break-up. The collection comprises all 22 of the Beatles' UK singles, which were originally issued between October 1962 and March 1970 on either the Parlophone or Apple record labels, together with a new single pairing "Yesterday" with "I Should Have Known Better".

== History ==
According to EMI, the series was a re-promotion rather than a reissue campaign, since all the Beatles' singles had remained in print and were widely available. The project resulted from the success of the 1973 double-album sets 1962–1966 and 1967–1970, which the former Beatles had endorsed, and which contained all of their British single A-sides and double A-side tracks. Each of the discs in the 1976 collection was packaged in a green and black sleeve, on one side of which was a photo of the group from a period roughly contemporaneous with the single. The records were available in a matching Singles Collection 1962–1970 box to customers who bought all 23 of the discs.

The re-packaging campaign was a commercial success, with 1 million singles sold in the first month. The response coincided with media speculation regarding rival bids from two US promoters for the Beatles to reunite for a satellite concert broadcast. Reflecting this resurgence of interest, BBC Radio 1 produced the program The Beatles Again, which highlighted the group's continued influence on pop music; in a feature article in Reveille, an EMI spokesman described the campaign as an "amazing" success, with teenagers as young as thirteen becoming fans of the Beatles.

The re-packaged singles all charted on the UK Singles Chart, and "Yesterday" peaked at number 8. During one week in April 1976, the band had an unprecedented 23 entries in the UK top 100 positions. The following month, Time magazine commented on this chart dominance: "Has a new successor to the Beatles finally been found? Not at all – it is the Beatles themselves." Later that year, Ringo Starr described the singles as "the finest pieces of plastic around that no one has done anything beyond yet", and wished for "a band that gets up there and wipes us out".

Although EMI and its North American counterpart, Capitol Records, were no longer obliged to consult the artists, John Lennon approved of the re-packaged singles. This tacit approval contrasted sharply with the former Beatles' reaction to the 1976 themed compilation album Rock 'n' Roll Music, which Capitol assembled without consulting EMI.

The series was first re-packaged for international release in December 1982 as The Beatles Singles Collection. Issued as a box set by EMI's World Records division, this collection also included three Beatles singles that had been released after March 1976: "Back in the U.S.S.R.", "Sgt. Pepper's Lonely Hearts Club Band"/"With a Little Help from My Friends" and "The Beatles' Movie Medley".

== Box-set contents ==
Catalogue numbers and release dates per Harry Castleman and Walter J. Podrazik's All Together Now, Nicholas Schaffner's The Beatles Forever, and Keith Badman's The Beatles Diary Volume 2.

Single A-side(s)	Single B-side(s)	Catalogue number	Original release date
"Love Me Do"	"P.S. I Love You"	Parlophone R 4949	5 October 1962
"Please Please Me"	"Ask Me Why"	Parlophone R 4983	11 January 1963
"From Me to You"	"Thank You Girl"	Parlophone R 5015	12 April 1963
"She Loves You"	"I'll Get You"	Parlophone R 5055	23 August 1963
"All My Loving"	"This Boy"	Parlophone R 5076	22 November 1963
"I Want to Hold Your Hand"	"I Saw Her Standing There"	Parlophone R 5084	29 November 1963
"Can't Buy Me Love"	"You Can't Do That"	Parlophone R 5114	20 March 1964
"A Hard Day's Night"	"Things We Said Today"	Parlophone R 5160	10 July 1964
"I Feel Fine"	"She's a Woman"	Parlophone R 5200	27 November 1964
"Ticket to Ride"	"Yes It Is"	Parlophone R 5265	9 April 1965
"Help!"	"I'm Down"	Parlophone R 5305	23 July 1965
"We Can Work It Out"	"Day Tripper"	Parlophone R 5389	3 December 1965
"Paperback Writer"	"Rain"	Parlophone R 5452	10 June 1966
"Eleanor Rigby"	"Yellow Submarine"	Parlophone R 5493	5 August 1966
"Strawberry Fields Forever"	"Penny Lane"	Parlophone R 5570	17 February 1967
"All You Need Is Love"	"Baby, You're a Rich Man"	Parlophone R 5620	7 July 1967
"Hello, Goodbye"	"I Am the Walrus"	Parlophone R 5655	24 November 1967
"Lady Madonna"	"The Inner Light"	Parlophone R 5675	15 March 1968
"Hey Jude"	"Revolution"	Apple R 5722	30 August 1968
"Get Back"	"Old Brown Shoe"	Apple R 5777	11 April 1969
"The Ballad of John and Yoko"	"Don't Let Me Down"	Apple R 5786	30 May 1969
"Something"	"Come Together"	Apple R 5814	31 October 1969
"Let It Be"	"You Know My Name (Look Up the Number)"	Apple R 5833	6 March 1970
"Yesterday"	"I Should Have Known Better"	Parlophone R 6013	5 March 1976

== The Singles Collection (2019) ==
The Singles Collection

Box set by the Beatles
- Released: 22 November 2019
- Genres: Rock, pop
- Label: Apple

The Beatles chronology
Abbey Road: 50th Anniversary Edition (2019)	The Singles Collection (2019)	Let It Be: Special Edition (2021)

On 22 November 2019, Apple released a box set titled The Singles Collection, consisting of vinyl reissues of the original Beatles singles. The set includes the same 22 UK singles excluding "Yesterday", instead being replaced with a custom double A-side of "Free as a Bird" and "Real Love".

Since picture sleeves were not commonplace in the UK during the 1960s, the records were presented in sleeve designs that had been used in other countries around the world. The box set includes a 40-page booklet containing photos and Kevin Howlett's essays on the music.

== See also ==
- Outline of the Beatles
- The Beatles timeline

== Sources ==
- Badman, Keith (2001). The Beatles Diary Volume 2: After the Break-Up 1970–2001. London: Omnibus Press. ISBN 978-0-7119-8307-6.
- Bagirov, Alex (2008). The Anthology of the Beatles Records. Rostock: Something Books. ISBN 978-3-936300-44-4.
- Castleman, Harry; Podrazik, Walter J. (1976). All Together Now: The First Complete Beatles Discography 1961–1975. New York, NY: Ballantine Books. ISBN 0-345-25680-8.
- Clayson, Alan (2003). Ringo Starr. London: Sanctuary. ISBN 1-86074-488-5.
- Rodriguez, Robert (2010). Fab Four FAQ 2.0: The Beatles' Solo Years, 1970–1980. Milwaukee, WI: Backbeat Books. ISBN 978-1-4165-9093-4.
- Schaffner, Nicholas (1978). The Beatles Forever. New York, NY: McGraw-Hill. ISBN 0-07-055087-5.
- Woffinden, Bob (1981). The Beatles Apart. London: Proteus. ISBN 0-906071-89-5.
- Womack, Kenneth (2014). The Beatles Encyclopedia: Everything Fab Four. Santa Barbara, CA: ABC-CLIO. ISBN 978-0-313-39171-2.
