= Reel Music =

Compilation album by the Beatles
- Released: 22 March 1982
- Recorded: 1964–1970
- Studios: EMI and Apple studios, London; Pathé Marconi Studio, Paris
- Genre: Rock
- Length: 42:03
- Label: Capitol
- Producers: George Martin and Phil Spector

The Beatles British chronology
The Beatles EP Collection (1981)	Reel Music (1982)	The Beatles: The Collection (1982)

The Beatles American chronology
Rarities (1980)	Reel Music (1982)	The Beatles: The Collection (1982)

Professional ratings
Review scores
Source	Rating
AllMusic	2.5/5 stars
The Encyclopedia of Popular Music	2/5 stars
The Rolling Stone Album Guide	3.5/5 stars

Reel Music is a compilation album featuring a selection of songs by the Beatles that were featured in their films, as the title suggests. The album was released on 22 March 1982 in the United States and the following day in the United Kingdom – almost simultaneously with the theatrical re-release of the film, A Hard Day's Night, which had been "cleaned" and re-edited with stereo Dolby sound. In the US, Reel Music peaked at number 19 on Billboard's albums chart.

The album was released by Capitol Records in the United States (catalogue number SV 12199) and Parlophone in the United Kingdom (PCS 7218). In the US and Canada, the album was issued simultaneously in limited edition gold vinyl pressings. In New Zealand, the LP was released on the Parlophone label (PCS 7218), and the inner sleeve and booklet were imported from the US. Aside from box-set collections, it was the first Beatles album released after John Lennon's death. Reel Music was certified gold by the Recording Industry Association of America.

The album cover illustrations are a painting by David McMacken.

== Unique mixes ==
The album features stereo mixes that were rare to the US or previously unavailable at the time:

- The first US release of the British stereo mix of "I Am the Walrus". Previous American releases of the song had the intro edited like the mono mix, although an edit of the British version appeared on Rarities two years before;
- The official American debut of the songs "A Hard Day's Night" and "Ticket to Ride" in true stereo;
- A unique stereo edit of "I Should Have Known Better", with the harmonica error in the intro fixed. This version was issued only on the Capitol pressing and has never appeared on any other record.

== Single ==
- The album was accompanied by the single "The Beatles' Movie Medley" b/w "I'm Happy Just to Dance with You", which came with a picture sleeve featuring the same artwork as the album cover. The A-side of the single featured an artificial medley, in which excerpts from seven songs from Reel Music ("Magical Mystery Tour", "All You Need Is Love", "You've Got to Hide Your Love Away", "I Should Have Known Better", "A Hard Day's Night", "Ticket to Ride" and "Get Back") were edited together to make a single track.
- Originally, the single's B-side was to be an interview with the group dubbed "Fab Four on Film", which was recorded during the filming of A Hard Day's Night in 1964. Capitol/EMI Records, however, could not obtain the necessary permission to utilise the interview on the single, and the mono mix of "I'm Happy Just to Dance with You" (which appeared in the A Hard Day's Night film but which was not included on the Reel Music album) was substituted as the B-side shortly before the single was released, although promotional copies of the single featured the interview.

== Track listing ==
All songs written by John Lennon and Paul McCartney.

Side one
No.	Title	Film in which song appeared	Length
1.	"A Hard Day's Night"	A Hard Day's Night	2:32
2.	"I Should Have Known Better"	A Hard Day's Night	2:45
3.	"Can't Buy Me Love"	A Hard Day's Night	2:15
4.	"And I Love Her"	A Hard Day's Night	2:31
5.	"Help!"	Help!	2:21
6.	"You've Got to Hide Your Love Away"	Help!	2:11
7.	"Ticket To Ride"	Help!	3:13
8.	"Magical Mystery Tour"	Magical Mystery Tour	2:52

Side two
No.	Title	Film in which song appeared	Length
1.	"I Am the Walrus"	Magical Mystery Tour	4:37
2.	"Yellow Submarine"	Yellow Submarine	2:43
3.	"All You Need Is Love"	Yellow Submarine	3:53
4.	"Let It Be"	Let It Be	4:03
5.	"Get Back"	Let It Be	3:07
6.	"The Long and Winding Road"	Let It Be	3:38

== Charts and certifications ==
=== Charts ===
Chart (1982)	Peak position
Australian (Kent Music Report)	26
Canada Top Albums/CDs (RPM)	19
UK Albums (Official Charts)	56
US Billboard 200	19

=== Certifications ===
Region	Certification	Certified units/sales
Canada (Music Canada)	Gold	50,000^{^}
United States (RIAA)	Gold	500,000^{^}
^{^} Shipments figures based on certification alone.
