= The Beatles' Greatest =

Compilation album by The Beatles
- Released: 1965
- Label: Odeon

The Beatles' Greatest is a compilation album by The Beatles released in Germany on the Odeon record label in 1965.

== Track listing ==
Side 1
No.	Title	Length
1.	"I Want to Hold Your Hand"
2.	"Twist and Shout"
3.	"A Hard Day's Night"
4.	"Eight Days a Week"
5.	"I Should Have Known Better"
6.	"Long Tall Sally"
7.	"She Loves You"
8.	"Please Mister Postman"

Side 2
No.	Title	Length
1.	"I Feel Fine"
2.	"Rock and Roll Music"
3.	"Ticket to Ride"
4.	"Please Please Me"
5.	"It Won't Be Long"
6.	"From Me to You"
7.	"Can't Buy Me Love"
8.	"All My Loving"

== Charts ==
Monthly charts

Chart (1966)	Peak position
German Albums (Offizielle Top 100)	38
