= The Beatles (The Original Studio Recordings) =

Box set by The Beatles
- Released: 9 September 2009
- Recorded: 1962–1970, at EMI, Trident, Olympic, Apple, De Lane Lea, Chappell and Regent Sound studios, London; Pathé Marconi Studio, Paris; EMI Studios, Bombay
- Genre: Rock
- Length: 10:19:33
- Labels: Apple, Parlophone, Capitol
- Producers: George Martin, Phil Spector (Let It Be); Simon Gibson, Paul Hicks, Sean Magee, Guy Massey, Sam Okell, Steve Rooke, Allan Rouse (remaster engineers)

The Beatles chronology
Love (2006)	The Beatles (The Original Studio Recordings) (2009)	The Beatles in Mono (2009)

The Beatles (The Original Studio Recordings), also known as The Beatles: Stereo Box Set, is a boxed set compilation comprising all remastered recordings by English rock band the Beatles. The set was issued on 9 September 2009, along with the remastered mono recordings and companion The Beatles in Mono and The Beatles: Rock Band video game. The remastering project for both mono and stereo versions was led by EMI senior studio engineers Allan Rouse and Guy Massey. The Stereo Box also features a DVD which contains all the short films that are on the CDs in QuickTime format. The release date of 09/09/09 is related to the significance to John Lennon of the number nine.

It is the second complete box set collection of original Beatles recordings after The Beatles Box Set (1988). Two earlier album collections, The Beatles Collection (1978) and The Collection (1982) did not contain all of the Beatles' recordings. Although sales were counted as 1 unit for each box set sold in the mono and stereo format, total individual sales exceeded 30 million.

The Beatles (The Original Studio Recordings) received the Grammy Award for Best Historical Album at the 53rd Grammys. The box set was issued on vinyl in 2012.

== Album listing ==
The sixteen-disc collection contains the remastered stereo versions of every album in the Beatles catalogue. The first four albums (Please Please Me, With the Beatles, A Hard Day's Night and Beatles for Sale) made their CD debut in stereo, though most songs from those albums have previously appeared on CD in stereo on various compilations. Both Help! and Rubber Soul use the remixes prepared by George Martin for the original 1987 CD releases (the original 1965 stereo mixes were released on The Beatles in Mono). Magical Mystery Tour is presented in the sequence and artwork of its original North American Capitol Records album release, as opposed to the UK six-song EP.

All CDs replicate their original album labels as first released, from the various Parlophone Records variations, to the Capitol Records label (for Magical Mystery Tour) and the UK Apple Records side A label from Yellow Submarine through Let It Be, and with the side A & side B Apple labels for discs one & two respectively for The Beatles. For Past Masters, disc one uses a mid-1960s Parlophone label design and disc two uses the (side A) Apple label design. Each of the albums except Past Masters includes a mini-documentary, mainly drawing from The Beatles Anthology (with a few animated 3D scenarios made up of original photos thrown in), about the album in QuickTime format. The Beatles and Past Masters are two-disc sets.

- Please Please Me (1963)
- With the Beatles (1963)
- A Hard Day's Night (1964)
- Beatles for Sale (1964)
- Help! (1965)
- Rubber Soul (1965)
- Revolver (1966)
- Sgt. Pepper's Lonely Hearts Club Band (1967)
- Magical Mystery Tour (1967)
- The Beatles (1968)
- Yellow Submarine (1969)
- Abbey Road (1969)
- Let It Be (1970)
- Past Masters (1988)

== Missing stereo session tapes ==
No stereo mixes exist for the 1963 single "She Loves You" and its flipside "I'll Get You" or the 1962 single "Love Me Do" and its flipside "P.S. I Love You". It was the practice at Abbey Road Studios prior to early 1963 to wipe and reuse master tapes once they had been mixed down to mono for single release. As a result, the only way to make true stereo mixes of "Love Me Do" or "P.S. I Love You" is through the use of technology that separates out the components of mono mixes. Although the practice had stopped by the time of the release of the "She Loves You" single, and although it is possible that the master tapes were in EMI's possession in January 1964, when the German language version was recorded, it is commonly believed that those tapes were either stolen or destroyed. Competent-sounding stereo versions of "She Loves You" have been created unofficially using the backing track from "Sie Liebt Dich", but the engineers who prepared the remasters elected not to do this. Every release of these four songs has been in mono (or simulated stereo) and they appear in mono on the stereo version of Past Masters and Please Please Me. This is also the case for the single version of "Love Me Do" with Ringo Starr on drums but at some point, even the mixed down mono tape of this version of the song was lost. Some authors have expressed the opinion that the original version of "Love Me Do" was intentionally destroyed in order to alleviate possible confusion between it and the more common version of the song. Since 1980, new transfers sourced from reasonably clean 45 rpm mono singles from private collectors have been used as the master for this version of the song.

Two other songs in the Beatles' catalogue which also appear in mono on the stereo CDs are "Only a Northern Song" and "You Know My Name (Look Up the Number)". Neither of these songs received stereo mixes at the time they were recorded, although other songs that were similarly not mixed into stereo during The Beatles' recording lifetime were not excluded from the set: the stereo mixes of "Strawberry Fields Forever", "Penny Lane" and "Baby, You're a Rich Man" all made in 1971, the stereo mix of "Yes It Is" that was given a very limited UK release in 1986 on a mail order cassette promotion that Apple and the Beatles did not authorise and was commercially released in 1988 on Past Masters; and the 2000 edit of "Day Tripper" from 1. "Only a Northern Song" was first mixed into stereo and 5.1 surround for the Yellow Submarine Songtrack album in 1999 and a differently-edited stereo mix of "You Know My Name (Look Up the Number)" appeared on Anthology 2 in 1996. "You Know My Name (Look Up the Number)" is the only track left in the Beatles' catalogue of which the original edit has never received a stereo mix despite the multi-tracks being available.

== Bonus features ==
Included in the set is a DVD called The Mini Documentaries compiling all the short documentaries released on the individual albums in QuickTime format. The DVD features narration from all four Beatles as well as George Martin as the opening on each of the individual albums. Each documentary contains rare footage and previously unheard dialogue. There are sound excerpts from various songs, accompanied by still photos, clips of television appearances, footage from inside recording sessions, film footage from their final photo session, and material from the five Beatles films A Hard Day's Night, Help!, Magical Mystery Tour, Yellow Submarine, and Let It Be. The DVD has a red Apple label (similar to that on the original US Let It Be LP). This DVD is exclusive to the Stereo set, and is not included in the Mono version.

== Limited edition USB flash drive ==
Apple-shaped USB flash drive

On 7 December 2009, The Beatles (The Original Studio Recordings) was also released as a limited edition of 30,000 apple-shaped USB flash drives. This event marks the first appearance for the Beatles catalogue in a high-resolution digital format being encoded in 44.1 kHz/24-bit FLAC format. CD-standard is 44.1 kHz/16-bit. The 16 GB flash drive also includes 320 kbps MP3 copies of the albums, a specially designed Flash interface, and all the visual elements from the boxed set – the mini-documentary films, original UK album art, rare photos and expanded liner notes.

== Vinyl ==
On 12 November 2012, the set was released on 180-gram vinyl, specially prepared for vinyl, with a 252-page book included. Also included are the inserts which were included in the original LPs such as the cardboard cutout sheet included in Sgt. Pepper plus the photos and poster included in The Beatles.

== Chart performance ==
Professional ratings
Review scores
Source	Rating
AllMusic	5/5 stars
The Austin Chronicle	4/5 stars
Entertainment Weekly	A
Pitchfork Media	10/10
Rolling Stone	5/5 stars
Spectrum Culture	5/5 stars

On the United States Billboard Top 200 albums chart the set debuted at number 15. On the Japanese Oricon weekly album charts, it debuted at number 6, selling over 35,000 copies in its first week. The set was certified triple platinum by the RIAA in April 2010. The set was also certified Diamond in Canada in March 2010.

In Germany, the box set reached number 37.

== Charts ==
Chart (2009–2014)	Peak position
Australian Albums (ARIA)	23
Austrian Albums (Ö3 Austria)	58
Belgian Albums (Ultratop Flanders)	3
Belgian Albums (Ultratop Wallonia)	7
Danish Albums (Hitlisten)	9
Dutch Albums (Album Top 100)	6
Finnish Albums (Suomen virallinen lista)	16
German Albums (Offizielle Top 100)	3
Italian Albums (FIMI)	16
New Zealand Albums (RMNZ)	32
Norwegian Albums (VG-lista)	3
Spanish Albums (Promusicae)	4
Swedish Albums (Sverigetopplistan)	15
Swiss Albums (Schweizer Hitparade)	52
UK Albums (Official Charts)	24
US Billboard 200	15

=== Year-end charts ===
Chart (2010)	Rank
German Albums Chart	94

== Subsequent releases ==
The 1973 greatest hits albums 1962–1966 and 1967–1970 were re-released and remastered by the same team behind those who remastered the Beatles' Stereo and Mono box sets. 1 and Yellow Submarine Songtrack have also received re-releases akin to the presentation of the 2009 remasters.

The same remastering team have also remastered all of John Lennon's studio albums plus Paul McCartney's solo albums reissued by Hear Music, as well as a handful of other albums released on Apple Records.

== See also ==
Other complete or near-complete collections of Beatles music:

- The Beatles Collection (1978)
- The Beatles Box (1980)
- The Beatles: The Collection (1982)
- The Beatles Mono Collection (1982)
- The Beatles Box Set (1988)
- The Beatles in Mono (2009)
- Outline of the Beatles
- The Beatles timeline
