= Love Songs (Beatles album) =

Compilation album by the Beatles
- Released: 21 October 1977
- Recorded: 11 September 1962 – 1 April 1970
- Studios: EMI, Olympic and Apple studios, London
- Genres: Pop; folk rock
- Length: 59:05
- Labels: Capitol (US), Parlophone (UK)
- Producers: George Martin and Phil Spector

The Beatles chronology
Live! at the Star-Club in Hamburg, Germany; 1962 (1977)	Love Songs (1977)	The Beatles Collection (1978)

Professional ratings
Review scores
Source	Rating
AllMusic	2.5/5 stars
The Encyclopedia of Popular Music	4/5 stars
The Rolling Stone Record Guide	4/5 stars

Love Songs is a compilation album that comprises love songs recorded by the Beatles between 1962 and 1970. It was released by Capitol Records in the United States on 21 October 1977 (catalogue number SKBL-11711) and on Parlophone in the United Kingdom on 19 November 1977 (PCSP 721). The compilation peaked at #24 in Billboard's Top LPs & Tape chart during a 31-week stay that began on 12 November 1977. The RIAA certified the album with sales of three million units in 2000 even though the compilation was deleted in the late 1980s. The New Zealand release followed the US release with cat. no. and pressing plates, and was released on 2 different EMI labels.

The LP's original packaging included an 11 × 11" booklet, with the songs' lyrics printed, calligraphy-style, on simulated parchment paper. For the first several pressings, the cover itself was simulated leather, and the Beatles' image (a re-working of Richard Avedon's 1967 portrait, featured in Look Magazine) was simulated gold-foil. The LP was also available on yellow vinyl.

As with the previous year's Rock 'n' Roll Music compilation, the songs were presented with the left and right channels reversed, with the four Rubber Soul tracks - "Girl", "In My Life", "Michelle", and "Norwegian Wood (This Bird Has Flown)" - appearing in slightly narrowed stereo. Three further tracks—"Yes It Is", "This Boy", and "P.S. I Love You"—used the Duophonic mixes.

== Track listing ==
All tracks written by John Lennon and Paul McCartney except where noted.

Side one
No.	Title	Writer(s)	Length
1.	"Yesterday"		2:03
2.	"I'll Follow the Sun"		1:47
3.	"I Need You"	George Harrison	2:27
4.	"Girl"		2:30
5.	"In My Life"		2:24
6.	"Words of Love"	Buddy Holly	2:12
7.	"Here, There and Everywhere"		2:22

Side two
No.	Title	Writer(s)	Length
1.	"Something"	George Harrison	3:00
2.	"And I Love Her"		2:28
3.	"If I Fell"		2:18
4.	"I'll Be Back"		2:21
5.	"Tell Me What You See"		2:35
6.	"Yes It Is"		2:38

Side three
No.	Title	Length
1.	"Michelle"	2:40
2.	"It's Only Love"	1:55
3.	"You're Going to Lose That Girl"	2:16
4.	"Every Little Thing"	2:01
5.	"For No One"	1:59
6.	"She's Leaving Home"	3:35

Side four
No.	Title	Length
1.	"The Long and Winding Road"	3:37
2.	"This Boy"	2:12
3.	"Norwegian Wood (This Bird Has Flown)"	2:02
4.	"You've Got to Hide Your Love Away"	2:07
5.	"I Will"	1:46
6.	"P.S. I Love You"	2:02

== Cancelled single ==
Capitol Records originally intended to release a single in promotion of the compilation. The song "Girl" was going to be backed with "You're Going to Lose That Girl" as Capitol 4506. Picture sleeves for the single were printed, but the record was cancelled in early October 1977.

== Charts and certifications ==
=== Charts ===
Chart (1977)	Peak position
Australian (Kent Music Report)	59
Canada Top Albums/CDs (RPM)	18
Norwegian Albums (VG-lista)	20
New Zealand Albums (RMNZ)	3
UK Albums (Official Charts)	7
US Billboard 200	24

=== Certifications and sales ===
Region	Certification	Certified units/sales
Austria	—	3,500
Canada (Music Canada)	Platinum	100,000^{^}
United Kingdom (BPI)	Silver	60,000^{^}
United States (RIAA)	3× Platinum	3,000,000^{^}
^{^} Shipments figures based on certification alone.
