= The Beatles Mono Collection =

Box set by the Beatles
- Released: 1982
- Recorded: September 1962 – October 1968, EMI, Trident, Olympic and Apple studios
- Genre: Rock
- Length: 445:37
- Labels: EMI/Parlophone, Apple
- Producer: George Martin

The Beatles chronology
The Beatles: The Collection (1982)	The Beatles Mono Collection (1982)	20 Greatest Hits (1982)

The Beatles Mono Collection is a boxed set of all Beatles' albums which were originally issued on mono LPs in the UK (Please Please Me to Yellow Submarine). EMI reportedly pressed a total of 10,000 copies of each reissue mono LP for sale individually. An unknown quantity of unnumbered red boxes (sometimes reported to be between 300 and 500) were issued in the UK, while 1000 numbered black boxed sets were assembled and issued in the United States by the Dutch East India Trading Co. These US sets originally sold for $79.00 and included a numbered certificate and an order blank for additional sets.

A new Mono Box, containing remastered monoural versions of the Beatles' core albums (with the exception of Yellow Submarine album) plus Mono Masters compilation, was released on 9 September 2009 along with Stereo Box and new stereo reissues of the individual albums, including the first four albums given their stereo debuts on CD.

== Album contents ==
The set contains the following Parlophone Beatles LPs:

- Please Please Me (PMC-1202)
- With the Beatles (PMC-1206)
- A Hard Day's Night (PMC-1230)
- Beatles for Sale (PMC-1240)
- Help! (PMC-1255)
- Rubber Soul (PMC-1267)
- Revolver (PMC-7009)
- Sgt. Pepper's Lonely Hearts Club Band (PMC-7027)
- The Beatles (PMC-7067/8)
- Yellow Submarine (PMC-7070)

The Yellow Submarine album, included in the set, is the only original UK mono Beatles LP without a dedicated mono mix. The mono album is simply a fold-down (two stereo channels combined into one) of the stereo mix. Magical Mystery Tour was not included in the set as it was not originally issued as an LP in the UK. The last two Beatles albums Abbey Road, and Let It Be were also not included as they never received a mono LP release in the UK. Some copies of the box set contained a faulty pressing of Sgt. Pepper's Lonely Hearts Club Band which had a stereo cut on Side B instead of mono.

== Personnel ==
For full personnel see individual albums

- George Harrison – vocals, guitars, sitar, tambura, organ, bass
- John Lennon – vocals, guitars, harmonica, keyboards, bass
- Paul McCartney – vocals, bass, keyboards, guitars
- Ringo Starr – vocals, drums, percussion

== See also ==
- Outline of the Beatles
- The Beatles timeline
