= This Boy =

1963 single by the Beatles

- Canadian picture sleeve

Single by the Beatles
- A-side: "I Want to Hold Your Hand" (UK); "All My Loving" (Canada)
- Released: 29 November 1963 (UK); 1964 (Canada)
- Recorded: 17 October 1963
- Genre: Doo wop; pop
- Length: 2:13
- Label: Parlophone (UK); Capitol (Canada)
- Songwriter: Lennon–McCartney
- Producer: George Martin

The Beatles UK singles chronology
"She Loves You" (1963)	"I Want to Hold Your Hand" / "This Boy" (1963)	"Can't Buy Me Love" (1964)

"This Boy" is a song by the English rock band the Beatles, written by John Lennon (credited to Lennon–McCartney). It was released in November 1963 as the B-side of the band's Parlophone single "I Want to Hold Your Hand" and was performed on the Morecambe and Wise Show. In the United States, it was issued in January 1964 on Meet the Beatles! which was Capitol Records' reconfigured version of the With the Beatles album. The Beatles performed the song live on 16 February 1964 for their second appearance on The Ed Sullivan Show. An instrumental easy listening arrangement by George Martin, re-titled "Ringo's Theme (This Boy)", was featured in the film A Hard Day's Night and the United Artists soundtrack album. This version was also issued as a single, reaching number 53 in the US and number one in Canada.

"This Boy" was remastered for compact disc by George Martin and released in 1988 on the Past Masters, Volume One compilation. On 9 September 2009, it was re-released on the two CD set Past Masters, as part of the remastering of the original Beatles' catalogue, and was included in The Beatles Stereo Box Set and in The Beatles in Mono box set.

== Composition ==
The track's composition was Lennon's attempt to write a tune in the style of Motown star Smokey Robinson, and specifically his song "I've Been Good to You", which has similar circular doo-wop chord changes, melody and arrangement. The tune and arrangement also draw from "You Don't Understand Me", a B-side to a Bobby Freeman single. Paul McCartney cites the Teddy Bears' 1958 hit "To Know Him Is to Love Him" also as being influential.

Lennon, McCartney, and George Harrison joined in singing an intricate three-part close harmony in the verses and refrain, and a similar technique is employed in later Beatles songs, notably "Yes It Is" and "Because". Originally the middle eight was conceived as a guitar solo but was altered during the recording process. Written in D major, the song revolves around a 1950s-style I-vi-ii-V doo-wop sequence in 12/8 time before moving to the harmonically complex middle eight (G-F♯^{7}-Bm-D^{7}-G-E^{7}-A-A^{7}) and back again for the final verse and fade-out. William Mann describes the song as "harmonically ... one of their most intriguing, with its chains of pandiatonic clusters".

== Recordings ==
The Beatles recorded "This Boy" on 17 October 1963, the same day they recorded "I Want To Hold Your Hand", the group's first fan club Christmas single, and a version of "You Really Got a Hold on Me".

They recorded fifteen takes of "This Boy" followed by two overdubs. The song was recorded with a rounded ending, although it was faded out during a mixing session on 21 October. Two takes were joined to make the final master, with the edit between the middle eight and the final verse (1:28).

Alternative recordings have also been officially released. A live version performed on Two of a Kind in 1963 was released on Anthology 1 and two incomplete takes from the original recording were released as a track on the single "Free as a Bird".

=== Ringo's Theme ===
"Ringo's Theme (This Boy)"
- US picture sleeve

Single by George Martin and His Orchestra

from the album A Hard Day's Night
- B-side: "And I Love Her" (instrumental)
- Released: July 1964 (US)
- Recorded: 1964
- Genre: Doo wop; pop
- Length: 3:08
- Label: United Artists
- Songwriter: Lennon–McCartney
- Producer: George Martin

An instrumental version of "This Boy", orchestrated by George Martin, is used as the incidental music during Ringo Starr's towpath scene in the film A Hard Day's Night. The piece, under the title, "Ringo's Theme (This Boy)", was released as a single—but failed to chart in the UK—on 7 August 1964 with "And I Love Her" on the B-Side, although it did reach number 53 in the American Top 100 later that year. It was also included on Martin's Parlophone album Off the Beatle Track and the EP Music From A Hard Day's Night by the George Martin Orchestra, released 19 February 1965. It was also included on the American A Hard Day's Night soundtrack album. Vic Flick's lead guitar work can be heard on "Ringo’s Theme", which plays as the Beatles drummer wanders around London on his own.

== Chart performance ==
Chart (1965)	Peak position
Canada	1
US Billboard Hot 100	53

== Personnel ==
- John Lennon – double-tracked lead vocal, harmony vocal, acoustic guitar
- Paul McCartney – harmony vocal, bass guitar
- George Harrison – harmony vocal, lead guitar
- Ringo Starr – drums

Production staff

- George Martin – producer

=== Ringo’s Theme (This Boy) ===
The instrumental version from the film is performed by:

- George Martin Orchestra
  - Vic Flick – lead guitar
  - George Martin – producer, orchestration
