= The Beatles in Mono =

Box set by The Beatles
- Released: 9 September 2009
- Recorded: 11 September 1962–30 April 1969 at EMI, Trident, Olympic, Apple, Chappell, De Lane Lea and Regent Sound studios, London; Pathé Marconi Studio, Paris; His Master's Voice studios, Bombay
- Genre: Rock
- Length: 9:37:46
- Labels: Apple, EMI
- Producers: George Martin; Simon Gibson, Paul Hicks, Sean Magee, Guy Massey, Sam Okell, Steve Rooke, Allan Rouse (remaster engineers)

The Beatles chronology
The Beatles (The Original Studio Recordings) (2009)	The Beatles in Mono (2009)	Mono Masters (2009)

Professional ratings
Review scores
Source	Rating
AllMusic	5/5 stars
The Austin Chronicle	4/5 stars
Classic Rock	9/10
The Guardian	5/5 stars
Mojo	5/5 stars
Pitchfork Media	10/10
Uncut	9/10

The Beatles in Mono is a boxed set compilation comprising the remastered monaural recordings by the Beatles. The set was released on compact disc on 9 September 2009, the same day the remastered stereo recordings and companion The Beatles (The Original Studio Recordings) were also released, along with The Beatles: Rock Band video game. The remastering project for both mono and stereo versions was led by EMI senior studio engineers Allan Rouse and Guy Massey.

The boxed set was released on 180-gram heavyweight vinyl on 9 September 2014, with each disc mastered directly from analog tape sources, rather than the digital remasters used for the CD release.

The box set was reissued on 18 July 2025.

== Intention ==
The Beatles in Mono was released to reflect the fact that most of the Beatles' catalogue was originally mixed and released in the monophonic format. Stereo recordings were a fairly new concept for pop music in the 1960s and did not become standard until nearly the end of that decade. This explains why the Beatles' earlier album releases were mixed for mono. By the late sixties, however, stereo recording for pop music was becoming more popular and, thus, the new standard. Therefore, the last few Beatles LPs—Yellow Submarine, Abbey Road and Let It Be—were mixed only in stereo. In the case of Sgt. Pepper's Lonely Hearts Club Band, all the mono mixes were done together with the Beatles themselves, throughout the recording of the album, whereas the stereo mixes were done in only six days by Abbey Road personnel George Martin, Geoff Emerick and Richard Lush after the album had been finished, with none of the Beatles attending. George Harrison commented:

At that time [...] the console was about this big with four faders on it. And there was one speaker right in the middle [...] and that was it. When they invented stereo, I remember thinking 'Why? What do you want two speakers for?', because it ruined the sound from our point of view. You know, we had everything coming out of one speaker; now it had to come out of two speakers. It sounded like ... very ... naked.

John Lennon did not like the stereo mix of his song "Revolution" on the 1967–1970 compilation album. Lennon stated during a 1974 interview:

The fast version was destroyed. It was a heavy record, but the stereo mix made it into a piece of ice-cream.

== Limited edition ==
Amazon.com advertised the set as a limited edition item in the United States. Less than a month prior to the set's release it was announced that the site had sold out of units. Less than two weeks before 9 September, many other online retailers announced the selling out of units from their inventories, including the Canadian Amazon.ca site.

EMI announced on 3 September 2009 that more mono boxed sets were to be pressed due to high demand from online pre-orders. It was still to remain a "limited edition", but since it had already been certified platinum by the RIAA it was not limited to 10,000 copies as originally stated.

In 2014, five years after the initial CD release, mono editions of each of the albums were released individually in vinyl format, though the mono editions for CD were still available only in the box set. All of the USA albums were released individually on CDs and as a box set, containing both the mono and original stereo mixes; this is the only other way to acquire the mono mixes on CD.

The 2009 CD versions of the albums were remastered digitally; the 2014 vinyl versions were cut from original mono tapes in an all-analogue process.

== Disc listing ==
The thirteen-disc (fourteen on LP) collection contains mono versions of every UK Beatles album released in true mono, plus Magical Mystery Tour, which in 1967 was only issued as an LP (in mono and stereo mixes, and augmented with the A- and B-sides of their recent singles) in the USA, Canada and a few other countries; in the UK and many other countries it was originally only issued as a 6-track double soundtrack EP (in both mono and stereo versions) and the album version wasn't issued until 1976, and then only in stereo.

The box contains a new compilation album titled Mono Masters (double CD and triple LP, depending on the box version), which compiles all the mono mixes of singles, B-sides and EP tracks that did not originally appear on any of the UK albums or Magical Mystery Tour.

- Please Please Me (1963)
- With the Beatles (1963)
- A Hard Day's Night (1964)
- Beatles for Sale (1964)
- Help! (1965)
- Rubber Soul (1965)
- Revolver (1966)
- Sgt. Pepper's Lonely Hearts Club Band (1967)
- Magical Mystery Tour (1967)
- The Beatles (1968)
- Mono Masters (1962–1970)

The albums Yellow Submarine, Abbey Road and Let It Be are not included in this set, as no true mono mixes of these albums were issued. The same holds true for the songs "The Ballad of John and Yoko", "Old Brown Shoe" and the single mix of "Let It Be", which were also omitted. A mono version of the Yellow Submarine album was released in the UK, but it was simply a fold-down (two stereo channels combined into one channel) from the stereo mix, not a unique and separate mono mix. Abbey Road and Let It Be were issued in the UK in mono on reel-to-reel tape and on LP in Brazil and other countries but, again, only as fold-downs from the respective stereo versions.

The previously unavailable true mono mixes of the four new Beatles songs released on the Yellow Submarine album ("Only a Northern Song", "All Together Now", "Hey Bulldog" and "It's All Too Much"), originally intended for a separate, but ultimately scrapped mono EP which would have also included a mono mix of "Across the Universe", are included on the Mono Masters compilation. Also omitted from this set, but included in the stereo box set, is a DVD containing the mini-documentaries included with the stereo remasters of the different albums.

The Beatles (commonly referred to as The White Album) was originally released in mono and stereo in the UK and several other countries, but in the United States, it was released only in stereo. However, the mono mixes of "Don't Pass Me By" and "Helter Skelter" had been previously issued in the US in 1980 on the Capitol Records Rarities compilation album.

All CDs replicate their original album labels as first released, from the various Parlophone Records label variations, to the Capitol Records label (for Magical Mystery Tour) and the UK Apple Records side A and B labels for discs 1 and 2 respectively for The Beatles. For Mono Masters, disc 1 uses a mid-1960s Parlophone label design and disc 2 uses the unsliced Apple label design. All vinyl labels of the Mono Masters use the Apple label design.

The CD versions of Help! and Rubber Soul contain the respective albums twice: in mono mix as well as in the original 1965 stereo mix. Those stereo mixes remained officially unpublished since 1987. The vinyl versions contain only the mono variants.

The CD set also includes a 44-page booklet with an essay on the important role that the mono mixes played in the Beatles' recording career, notes on every track featured in Mono Masters, and a track-by-track listing of the recordings. The vinyl set includes a 108-page book which also includes many rare photographs of the Beatles in Abbey Road Studio, fascinating EMI archive documents and evocative articles sourced from 1960s publications.

== Chart performance ==
The set debuted at number 40 on Billboard's Top 200 chart and the magazine reported that 12,000 copies were sold in its first week of release. In Japan, it debuted at number 10, selling over 20,000 copies in its first week on the Oricon album charts. The set was certified platinum by the Recording Industry Association of America in April 2010.

== Charts ==
2009 chart performance for The Beatles in Mono
Chart (2009)	Peak position
Belgian Albums (Ultratop Flanders)	51
Belgian Albums (Ultratop Wallonia)	89
Danish Albums (Hitlisten)	36
Dutch Albums (Album Top 100)	41
Italian Albums (FIMI)	70
Spanish Albums (Promusicae)	72
Swedish Albums (Sverigetopplistan)	15
UK Albums (Official Charts)	57
US Billboard 200	40

2024–2025 chart performance for The Beatles in Mono
Chart (2024–2025)	Peak position
German Albums (Offizielle Top 100)	13
Greek Albums (IFPI)	34
Swiss Albums (Schweizer Hitparade)	80

== See also ==
- Outline of the Beatles
- The Beatles timeline
