= Let It Be (album) =

1970 studio album by the Beatles

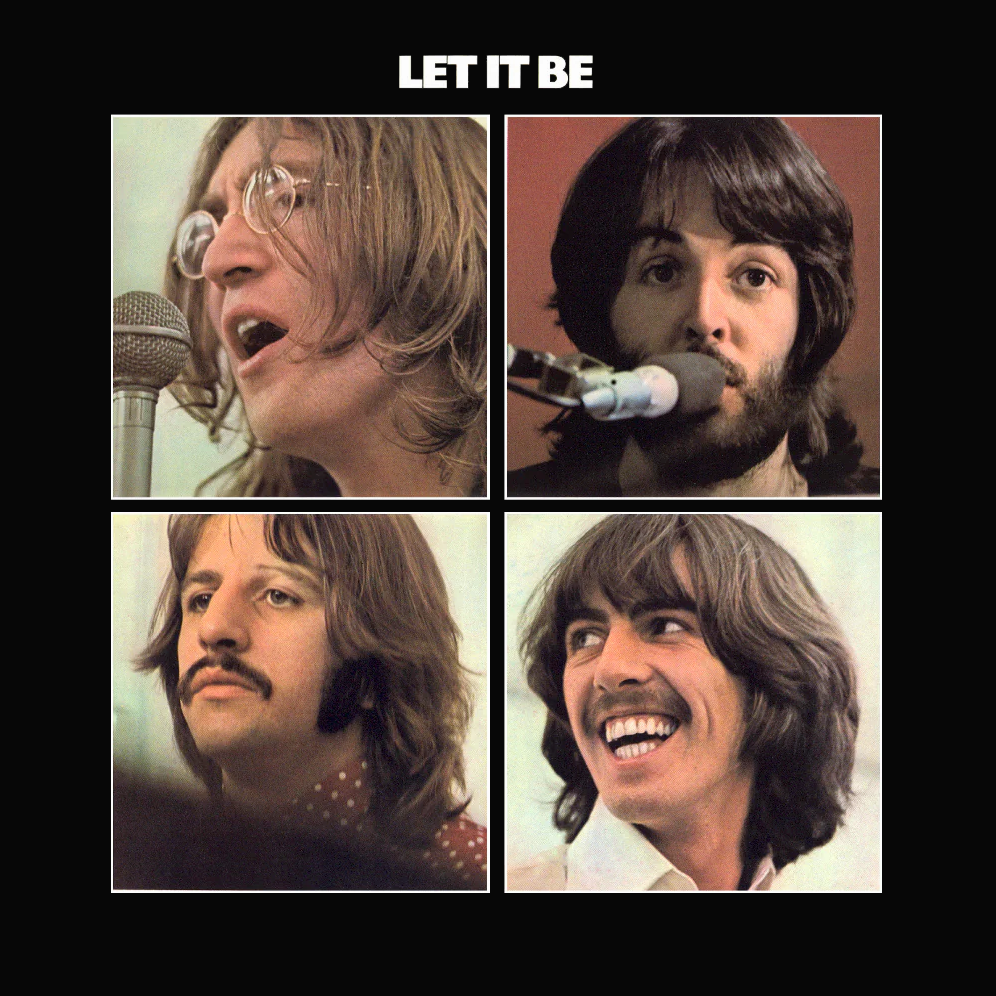

Studio album by the Beatles
- Released: 8 May 1970
- Recorded: 4, 8 February 1968; 24–31 January 1969; 3, 4, 8 January 1970; 1 April 1970
- Venues: Apple Corps rooftop, London
- Studios: Apple, EMI and Olympic Sound, London
- Genre: Rock
- Length: 35:10
- Label: Apple
- Producer: Phil Spector

The Beatles chronology
Abbey Road (1969)	Let It Be (1970)	The Beatles' Christmas Album (1970)

The Beatles North American chronology
Hey Jude (1970)	Let It Be (1970)	From Then to You (1970)

Singles from Let It Be
- 1. "Get Back" Released: 11 April 1969; 2. "Let It Be" Released: 6 March 1970

Let It Be is the twelfth and final studio album by the English rock band the Beatles. It was released on 8 May 1970, nearly a month after the official announcement of the group's public break-up, in tandem with the documentary of the same name. Concerned about recent friction within the band, Paul McCartney had conceived the project as a deliberate attempt to return to the band's rock 'n' roll roots. Its rehearsals started at Twickenham Film Studios on 2 January 1969 as part of a planned television documentary showcasing the Beatles' return to live performance.

The filmed rehearsals were marked by ill feeling, leading to George Harrison's temporary departure from the group. As a condition of his return, the members reconvened at their own Apple Studio, and recruited guest keyboardist Billy Preston. Together, they performed a single public concert on the studio's rooftop on 30 January, their last public performance; three of the album's tracks were drawn from this concert. In April, the Beatles issued the lead single "Get Back", backed with "Don't Let Me Down", after which engineer Glyn Johns prepared and submitted mixes of the album, then titled Get Back, which the band rejected. As bootlegs of these mixes circulated widely among fans, the project remained in limbo, and the group moved on to recording the album Abbey Road, released in September of that year.

In January 1970, four months after John Lennon departed from the band, the remaining Beatles completed "Let It Be" and recorded "I Me Mine". The former was issued as the second single from the album with production by George Martin. When the documentary film was resurrected for a cinema release, as Let It Be, Lennon and Harrison asked American producer Phil Spector to assemble the accompanying album. Among Spector's choices was to include a 1968 take of "Across the Universe" and apply orchestral and choral overdubs to "Across the Universe", "I Me Mine" and "The Long and Winding Road". His work offended McCartney, particularly in the case of "The Long and Winding Road", which was released as a single in the US on 11 May.

Let It Be topped record charts in several countries, including both the UK and the US. However, it was a critical failure at the time, and came to be regarded as one of the most controversial rock albums in history, though retrospective reception has been more positive. In 2003, McCartney spearheaded Let It Be... Naked, an alternative version of Let It Be that removes Spector's embellishments and alters the tracklist. In 2021, another remixed and expanded edition of Let It Be was released with session highlights and the original 1969 Get Back mix, coinciding with The Beatles: Get Back, an eight-hour documentary series covering the January 1969 sessions and rooftop concert.

== Background ==
The Beatles completed the five-month sessions for their self-titled double album (also known as the "White Album") in mid-October 1968. While the sessions had revealed deep divisions within the group for the first time, leading to Ringo Starr quitting for three weeks, the band enjoyed the opportunity to re-engage with ensemble playing, as a departure from the psychedelic experimentation that had characterised their recordings since the band's retirement from live performance in August 1966. Before the White Album's release, John Lennon enthused to music journalist Jonathan Cott that the Beatles were "coming out of our shell ... kind of saying: remember what it was like to play?" George Harrison welcomed the return to the band's roots, saying that they were aiming "to get as funky as we were in the Cavern".

Concerned about the friction over the previous year, Paul McCartney was eager for the Beatles to perform live again. In early October 1968, he told the press that the band would soon play a live show for subsequent broadcast in a TV special. The following month, Apple Corps announced that the Beatles had booked the Roundhouse in north London for 12–23 December and would perform at least one concert during that time. When this plan failed to come to fruition, Denis O'Dell, the head of Apple Films, suggested that the group be filmed rehearsing at Twickenham Film Studios, in preparation for their return to live performance, since he had booked studio space there to shoot The Magic Christian.

The initial plan was that the rehearsal footage would be edited into a short TV documentary promoting the main TV special, in which the Beatles would perform a public concert or perhaps two concerts. Michael Lindsay-Hogg had agreed to direct the project, having worked with the band on some of their promotional films. The project's timeline was dictated by Harrison being away in the United States until Christmas and Starr's commitment to begin filming his role in The Magic Christian in February 1969. The band intended to perform only new material and were therefore under pressure to finish writing an album's worth of songs. Although the concert venue was not established when rehearsals began on 2 January, it was decided that the 18th would serve as a potential dress rehearsal day; the 19th and 20th would serve as concert dates.

== Recording and production ==
=== Twickenham rehearsals ===
It was a disaster. They were still exhausted from the marathon The Beatles sessions. Paul bossed George around; George was moody and resentful. John would not even go to the bathroom without Yoko at his side ... The tension was palpable, and it was all being caught on film.

— Barry Miles, The Beatles Diary

The Twickenham rehearsals quickly disintegrated into what Apple Corps executive Peter Brown characterised as a "hostile lethargy". Lennon and his partner Yoko Ono had descended into heroin addiction after their arrest on drugs charges in October and Ono's subsequent miscarriage. Unable to supply his quota of new songs for the project, Lennon maintained an icy distance from his bandmates and scorned McCartney's ideas. By contrast, Harrison was inspired by his recent stay in the US; there, he enjoyed jamming with musicians in Los Angeles and experienced a musical camaraderie and creative freedom with Bob Dylan and the Band in upstate New York that was lacking in the Beatles. Harrison presented several new songs for consideration at Twickenham, some of which were dismissed by Lennon and McCartney. McCartney's attempts to focus the band on their objective were construed as overly controlling, particularly by Harrison.

The atmosphere in the film studios, the early start each day, and the intrusive cameras and microphones of Lindsay-Hogg's film crew combined to heighten the Beatles' discontent. When the band rehearsed McCartney's "Two of Us" on 6 January, a tense exchange ensued between McCartney and Harrison about the latter's lead guitar part. During lunch on 10 January, Lennon and Harrison had a heated disagreement in which Harrison berated Lennon for his lack of engagement with the project. Harrison was also angry with Lennon for telling a music journalist that the Beatles' Apple organisation was in financial ruin. According to journalist Michael Housego's report in the Daily Sketch, Harrison and Lennon's exchange descended into violence with the pair allegedly throwing punches at each other. Harrison denied this in a 16 January interview for the Daily Express, saying: "There was no punch-up. We just fell out." (Note: The film audio tapes from 22 January capture Harrison and Lennon discussing the Daily Sketch article, which was titled "The End of a Beautiful Friendship?" Lennon was offended by the idea that the Beatles would ever use violence against one another and is heard asking O'Dell whether they can sue Housego for his false reporting.) After lunch on 10 January, Harrison announced that he was leaving the band and told the others, "See you round the clubs." Starr attributed Harrison's exit to McCartney "dominating" him.

=== Apple sessions ===
During a meeting on 15 January, the band agreed to Harrison's terms for returning to the group: they would abandon the plan to stage a public concert and move from the cavernous soundstage at Twickenham to their Apple Studio, where they would be filmed recording a new album, using the material they had gathered to that point. The band's return to work was delayed by the poor quality of the recording and mixing equipment designed by Lennon's friend "Magic" Alex Mardas and installed at Apple Studio, in the basement of the Apple Corps building at 3 Savile Row. Producer George Martin, who had been only a marginal presence at Twickenham, arranged to borrow two four-track recorders from EMI Studios; he and audio engineer Glyn Johns then prepared the facility for the Beatles' use.

Sessions (and filming) at Apple began on 21 January. The atmosphere in the band was markedly improved. To help achieve this, Harrison invited keyboardist Billy Preston to participate, after meeting him outside the Apple building on 22 January. Preston contributed to most of the recording and also became an Apple Records artist. McCartney and Lindsay-Hogg continued to hope for a public concert by the Beatles to cap the project.

=== Rooftop concert ===
According to Beatles historian Mark Lewisohn, it is uncertain who thought of a rooftop concert, but the idea was conceived just days before the actual event. In Preston's recollection, it was John Lennon who suggested it.

Until the last minute, according to Lindsay-Hogg, the Beatles were still undecided about performing the concert. He recalled that on 30 January, they had discussed it and then gone silent, until "John said in the silence, 'Fuck it – let's go do it.'" The four Beatles and Preston arrived on the roof at around 12:30 pm. When they began to play, there was confusion nearby among members of the public, many of whom were on their lunch break. As the news of the event spread, crowds began to congregate in the streets and on the flat rooftops of nearby buildings.

Police officers ascended to the roof just as the Beatles began the second take of "Don't Let Me Down". The concert came to an end with the conclusion of "Get Back".

Recording of the project (and filming) wrapped on 31 January.

=== Get Back mixes ===
Cover of the aborted Get Back album, mirroring the cover of the band's first album, Please Please Me

In early March, Lennon and McCartney called Johns to Abbey Road and offered him free rein to compile an album from the Get Back recordings. Johns booked time at Olympic Studios between 10 March and 28 May to mix the album and completed the final banded master tape on 28 May. Only one track, "One After 909", was taken from the rooftop concert, with "I've Got a Feeling" and "Dig a Pony" (then called "All I Want Is You") being studio recordings instead. Johns also favoured earlier, rougher versions of "Two of Us" and "The Long and Winding Road" over the more polished performances from the final, 31 January session (which were eventually chosen for the Let It Be film; the Let It Be album used the 31 January take of "Two of Us" but the same 26 January take of "The Long and Winding Road" that Johns had used). It also included a jam called "Rocker", a brief rendition of the Drifters' "Save the Last Dance for Me", Lennon's "Don't Let Me Down" and a four-minute edit of "Dig It". (Note: In an interview he gave to some American journalists in early May, Lennon described the Get Back album as "Apple Skyline", referring to Dylan's just-released Nashville Skyline.) A tape copy of this acetate would later make its way to the United States, where it was played on radio stations in Buffalo and Boston over September 1969.

The cover of the proposed album featured a photograph of the Beatles taken by Angus McBean on 13 May in the interior stairwell at EMI's Manchester Square headquarters. The photo was intended as an update of the group's Please Please Me cover image from 1963 and was particularly favoured by Lennon. The text design and placement similarly mirrored that of the 1963 LP sleeve. (Note: Although discarded for Let It Be, the two contrasting band photos were instead used for the covers of the Beatles' 1973 compilation albums 1962–1966 and 1967–1970.) A different photograph from this shoot was later used for the cover of the 1967–1970 compilation album. The sequencing of "One After 909", a Lennon–McCartney composition from the early 1960s, as the opening track furthered the back-to-the-roots aesthetic. The Beatles rejected the album.

The Get Back album was intended for release in July 1969, but its release was pushed back to September to coincide with the planned television special and the theatrical film about the making of the album. In September, the release was pushed back to December, because the Beatles had just recorded Abbey Road and wanted to issue that album instead. On 20 September, six days before Abbey Road was released, Lennon told McCartney, Starr, and business manager Allen Klein (Harrison was not present) that he "wanted a divorce" from the group. By December, the Get Back album had been shelved.

On 15 December, the Beatles again approached Johns to compile an album, but this time with the instruction that the songs must match those included in the as yet unreleased Get Back film. Between 15 December 1969 and 8 January 1970, new mixes were prepared. Johns's new mix omitted "Teddy Boy" as the song did not appear in the film. It added "Across the Universe" (a remix of the 1968 studio version, as the January 1969 rehearsals had not been properly recorded) and "I Me Mine", on which only Harrison, McCartney and Starr performed, as Lennon had already left the band. "I Me Mine" was newly recorded on 3 January 1970, as it appeared in the film since no multi-track recording had yet been made. Johns also rearranged the playlist, moving "Let It Be" away from "The Long and Winding Road" onto the first side. The Beatles once again rejected the album.

=== Final mixing ===
Producer Phil Spector was invited by Lennon and Harrison to take on the task of turning the Beatles' abandoned Get Back recording sessions into a usable album. The songs "Get Back" and "Don't Let Me Down" had been released on a single in April 1969 and "Let It Be" was the A-side of the band's March 1970 single. To coincide with the single, the project was renamed Let It Be. The film, now with the new title, was premiered in New York City on 13 May 1970. One week later, UK premieres were held at the Liverpool Gaumont Cinema and the London Pavilion. None of the Beatles attended any of the premieres.

"Let It Be"
The Beatles' "Let It Be" from Let It Be

For the soundtrack album, Spector chose three tracks recorded live from the rooftop performance: "I've Got a Feeling", "One After 909" and "Dig a Pony". "Two of Us" was recorded "live in the studio" with the band members playing together in a single take, and without overdubs or splicing. Spector included "Dig It" and "Maggie Mae", which were improvised during the recordings. "Get Back", on the other hand, included only the section recorded on 27 January 1969, without the coda recorded the next day, and cross-faded to the remarks at the end of the rooftop concert.

Seven of the tracks were thereby released in accordance with the original plans for the Get Back project, whereas the album versions of "For You Blue", "I Me Mine", "Let It Be" and "The Long and Winding Road" include editing, splicing and/or overdubs. "Don't Let Me Down", recorded live in the studio two days before the rooftop concert, was omitted from the album. "Across the Universe" is an edited version of the original 1968 recording, played back at a slower speed (which lowered the key from D to D♭), which had only been rehearsed at Twickenham and not professionally recorded on multi-track tape during the January 1969 sessions.

McCartney was dissatisfied with Spector's treatment of some songs, particularly "The Long and Winding Road". McCartney had conceived of the song as a simple piano ballad, but Spector dubbed in orchestral and choral accompaniment. Lennon defended Spector's work in his "Lennon Remembers" interview for Rolling Stone, saying, "He was given the shittiest load of badly recorded shit – and with a lousy feeling to it – ever. And he made something out of it. He did a great job. When I heard it, I didn't puke."

Lennon chose not to credit Johns for his contribution as a producer. When EMI informed Martin that he would not get a production credit because Spector produced the final version, Martin commented, "I produced the original, and what you should do is have a credit saying 'Produced by George Martin, over-produced by Phil Spector'."

== Packaging ==
The original box set packaging of Let It Be. It contained a 160-page booklet with photos and quotes from the film.

In most countries except the United States, the Let It Be LP was originally presented in a box with a full colour book. The book contained photos by Ethan Russell from the January 1969 filming, dialogue from the film, with all expletives removed at EMI's insistence, and essays by Rolling Stone writers Jonathan Cott and David Dalton. Despite the new album title, the book was still titled Get Back. Its inclusion was another step in the Beatles' efforts to provide increasingly elaborate packaging for their records since Sgt. Pepper's Lonely Hearts Club Band. The book's lavishness increased production costs by 33 per cent, however, driving the retail price higher than for any previous Beatles album.

In the United States, the Let It Be album was issued in a gatefold cover and was initially distributed by United Artists Records instead of their usual Capitol Records, with the record using red-tinted Apple labels to reflect this change. (Capitol would acquire United Artists in 1979.) On both sides of the disc, the words "Phil+Ronnie" are inscribed into the inner dead wax.

The LP cover was designed by John Kosh and includes individual photos of the four band members, again taken by Russell. On the front cover, the photos are set in quadrants on a black surround. The album title appears in white text above the images but, as on Abbey Road, Rubber Soul, and Revolver, the cover does not include the band's name. Written by Apple press officer Derek Taylor, the LP's liner notes described Let It Be as a "new phase Beatles album", adding that "in come the warmth and the freshness of a live performance; as reproduced for disc by Phil Spector". Martin and Johns were among those listed for "thanks to".

== Critical reception and legacy ==
Retrospective professional ratings
Review scores
Source	Rating
AllMusic	4.5/5 stars
The A.V. Club	B−
Billboard	4/5 stars
Chicago Sun-Times	2.5/4 stars
Christgau's Record Guide	A−
The Daily Telegraph	2/5 stars
Encyclopedia of Popular Music	3/5 stars
Pitchfork	9.1/10
The Rolling Stone Album Guide	3/5 stars
Sputnikmusic	4/5

Let It Be topped album charts in both the US and the UK, and the "Let It Be" single and "The Long and Winding Road" also reached number 1 in the US. Despite its commercial success, according to Beatles Diary author Keith Badman, "reviews [were] not good". NME critic Alan Smith wrote: "If the new Beatles' soundtrack is to be their last then it will stand as a cheapskate epitaph, a cardboard tombstone, a sad and tatty end to a musical fusion which wiped clean and drew again the face of pop." Smith added that the album showed "contempt for the intelligence of today's record-buyer" and that the Beatles had "sold out all the principles for which they ever stood". Reviewing for Rolling Stone, John Mendelsohn was also critical of the album, citing Spector's production embellishments as a weakness: "Musically, boys, you passed the audition. In terms of having the judgment to avoid either over-producing yourselves or casting the fate of your get-back statement to the most notorious of all over-producers, you didn't."

John Gabree of High Fidelity magazine found the album "not nearly as bad as the movie" and "positively wonderful" relative to the recent solo releases by McCartney and Starr. Gabree admired "Let It Be", "Get Back" and "Two of Us", but derided "The Long and Winding Road" and "Across the Universe", the last of which he described as "bloated and self-satisfied – the kind of song we've come to expect from these rich, privileged prototeenagers". While questioning whether the Beatles' split would remain permanent, William Mann of The Times described Let It Be as "Not a breakthrough record, unless for the predominance of informal, unedited live takes; but definitely a record to give lasting pleasure. They aren't having to scrape the barrel yet." In his review for The Sunday Times, Derek Jewell deemed the album to be "a last will and testament, from the blackly funereal packaging to the music itself, which sums up so much of what The Beatles as artists have been – unmatchably brilliant at their best, careless and self-indulgent at their least."

In a retrospective review, Richie Unterberger of AllMusic described Let It Be as the "only Beatles album to occasion negative, even hostile reviews", but felt that it was "on the whole underrated". He singles out "some good moments of straight hard rock in 'I've Got a Feeling' and 'Dig a Pony'", and praises "Let It Be", "Get Back" and "the folky 'Two of Us'". Reviewing for The Daily Telegraph in 2009, Neil McCormick described Let It Be as a "slightly sad postscript", adding, "there are still monster tunes here by anyone else's standards, but it lacks sonic clarity, and is peppered with under-developed, sub-standard blues."

Let It Be was ranked number 86 in Rolling Stone's list of the 500 Greatest Albums of All Time in 2003, number 392 in the 2012 version, and number 342 in the 2020 edition. It was voted number 890 in the third edition of Colin Larkin's All Time Top 1000 Albums (2000). On Metacritic, the 50th Anniversary multi-disc Super Deluxe Edition of the album holds a score of 91 out of 100, based on seven professional reviews, indicating "universal acclaim".

In 1971, Let It Be won the Grammy Award for the Best Original Score Written for a Motion Picture or Television Special. It was also one of the nominations for the Grammy Award for Best Contemporary Vocal Performance by a Duo, Group or Chorus. Despite his objections to Spector's embellishments and the expensive packaging, including the "blatant hype" printed on the LP's back cover, McCartney personally accepted the band's award. (Note: McCartney later said that when preparing the Let It Be album for release in 1970, they all knew that the Beatles were no more and, with regard to the sleeve's "new phase" claim, "nothing was further from the truth." He added that Klein had arranged for the album to be "reproduced" because he did not find it sufficiently commercial.) That same year, the Beatles won the Academy Award for the Best Original Song Score for the songs in the film.

In 1988, the Slovenian band Laibach released a martial industrial, track-for-track version of the album, also titled Let It Be. Beatles author Kenneth Womack comments on Laibach's notable exclusion of the title track and describes the album as "military style interpretations and choral pieces". For the magazine's October 2010 issue, Mojo released Let It Be Revisited, a CD containing interpretations of the songs by acts such as Beth Orton, Phosphorescent, Judy Collins, Wilko Johnson, the Besnard Lakes, John Grant and the Jim Jones Revue.

== Reissues ==
In 1976, the United Artists release of the Let It Be album went out of print in America until 1979, when United Artists Records was acquired by Capitol Records. Let It Be was reissued on the Capitol label, catalogue number SW 11922; during this three year hiatus, many counterfeit copies of the LP appeared on the market in the US.

=== Let It Be... Naked ===
Paul McCartney, long unhappy with the original Phil Spector–produced Let It Be LP, initiated a remix of the album, titled Let It Be... Naked which was released in 2003. The album was presented as an alternative attempt to capture the original artistic vision of the project, to "get back" to the rock and roll sound of the band's early years. The album features alternate takes, edits, and mixes of the songs, mainly removing elements added by Spector. The album omits the group chatter, "Maggie Mae" and "Dig It", and adds a live rooftop performance of "Don't Let Me Down", a song omitted from the original album and issued as the B side of the "Get Back" single in 1969.

=== Deluxe editions ===
In November 2021, The Beatles: Get Back, a new documentary directed by Peter Jackson using footage captured for the Let It Be film, was released on Disney+ as a three-part miniseries. It was originally going to be theatrically released in 2020 to coincide with the 50th anniversary of the Let It Be album, but was delayed to November 2021 and moved to Disney+. A book, also titled The Beatles: Get Back, was released in October 2022 ahead of the documentary.

A super deluxe version of the album was released on 15 October 2021.

== Track listing ==
=== Original release ===
Lead vocals according to Ian MacDonald.

All tracks are written by Lennon–McCartney, except where noted.

Side one
No.	Title	Writer(s)	Lead vocals	Length
1.	"Two of Us"		McCartney and Lennon	3:36
2.	"Dig a Pony"		Lennon	3:54
3.	"Across the Universe"		Lennon	3:48
4.	"I Me Mine"	George Harrison	Harrison	2:26
5.	"Dig It"	Lennon, McCartney, Harrison, Richard Starkey	Lennon	0:50
6.	"Let It Be"		McCartney	4:03
7.	"Maggie Mae"	traditional; arranged by Lennon, McCartney, Harrison, Starkey	Lennon and McCartney	0:40
Total length:				19:17

Side two
No.	Title	Writer(s)	Lead vocals	Length
1.	"I've Got a Feeling"		McCartney and Lennon	3:37
2.	"One After 909"		Lennon with McCartney	2:54
3.	"The Long and Winding Road"		McCartney	3:38
4.	"For You Blue"	Harrison	Harrison	2:32
5.	"Get Back"		McCartney	3:09
Total length:				15:50 35:10

=== Rejected Glyn Johns versions ===
According to Mark Lewisohn:

Get Back version one (May 1969)

Side one

1. "One After 909"
2. "Rocker / Save the Last Dance for Me" (Doc Pomus, Mort Shuman)
3. "Don't Let Me Down"
4. "Dig a Pony"
5. "I've Got a Feeling"
6. "Get Back"

Side two

1. "For You Blue"
2. "Teddy Boy"
3. "Two of Us"
4. "Maggie Mae"
5. "Dig It"
6. "Let It Be"
7. "The Long and Winding Road"
8. "Get Back (reprise)"

Get Back version two (January 1970)

Side one

1. "One After 909"
2. "Rocker / Save the Last Dance for Me" (Pomus, Shuman)
3. "Don't Let Me Down"
4. "Dig a Pony"
5. "I've Got a Feeling"
6. "Get Back"
7. "Let It Be"

Side two

1. "For You Blue"
2. "Two of Us"
3. "Maggie Mae"
4. "Dig It"
5. "The Long and Winding Road"
6. "I Me Mine"
7. "Across the Universe"
8. "Get Back (reprise)"

== Personnel ==
The Beatles

- John Lennon – lead and backing vocals, rhythm guitar, lead guitar on "Get Back", lap steel guitar on "For You Blue", acoustic guitar on "Two of Us", "Across the Universe" and "Maggie Mae", six-string bass guitar on "Dig It" and "The Long and Winding Road", whistling on "Two of Us"
- Paul McCartney – lead and backing vocals, bass guitar, acoustic guitar on "Two of Us" and "Maggie Mae", piano on "Dig It", "Across the Universe", "Let It Be", "The Long and Winding Road", and "For You Blue", Hammond organ on "I Me Mine", electric piano on "I Me Mine" and "Let It Be", maracas on "Let It Be"
- George Harrison – lead and rhythm guitars, acoustic guitar on "For You Blue" and "I Me Mine", tambura on "Across the Universe", lead vocals on "I Me Mine" and "For You Blue", backing vocals
- Ringo Starr – drums, maracas on "Across the Universe"

Additional musicians

- Richard Anthony Hewson – string and brass arrangements on "I Me Mine" and "The Long and Winding Road"
- John Barham – choral arrangements on "Across the Universe", "I Me Mine" and "The Long and Winding Road"
- George Martin – shaker on "Dig It", string and brass arrangements on "Let It Be", production
- Linda McCartney – backing vocals on "Let It Be"
- Billy Preston – electric piano on "Dig a Pony", "I've Got a Feeling", "One After 909", "The Long and Winding Road" and "Get Back", Hammond organ on "Dig It" and "Let It Be"
- Brian Rogers – string and brass arrangements on "Across the Universe"

Production

- Glyn Johns – audio engineering, mixing
- Alan Parsons – assistant engineer
- George Martin – producer, original mixing (uncredited)
- Phil Spector – credited as producer (final overdubs), final mixing

== Charts ==
=== Weekly charts ===
Chart (1970–71)	Peak position
Australian Kent Music Report Chart	1
Canadian RPM Albums Chart	1
Dutch Mega Albums Chart	1
Finland (Suomen virallinen lista)	4
Italian Albums (Musica e dischi)	1
Japanese Oricon LP Chart	2
Norwegian VG-lista Albums Chart	1
Swedish Albums Chart	2
UK Albums Chart	1
US Billboard Top LPs	1
West German Media Control Albums Chart	3

=== Weekly charts (1987 reissue) ===
Chart (1987)	Peak position
Japanese Albums Chart	8
UK Albums Chart	50

=== Weekly charts (2009 reissue) ===
Chart (2009)	Peak position
Austrian Albums Chart	52
Belgian Albums Chart (Flanders)	37
Belgian Albums Chart (Wallonia)	64
Danish Albums Chart	40
Finnish Albums Chart	34
Japanese Albums Chart	18
Mexican Albums Chart	30
Portuguese Albums Chart	11
Spanish Albums Chart	45
Swedish Albums Chart	24
Swiss Albums Chart	48
New Zealand Albums Chart	29
UK Albums Chart	49

=== Weekly charts (2021 reissue) ===
Chart (2021)	Peak position
Australian Albums (ARIA)	2
Belgian Albums (Ultratop Flanders)	6
Belgian Albums (Ultratop Wallonia)	2
Canadian Albums (Billboard)	8
Czech Albums (ČNS IFPI)	14
Finnish Albums (Suomen virallinen lista)	5
German Albums (Offizielle Top 100)	3
Hungarian Albums (MAHASZ)	34
Irish Albums (Official Charts)	3
New Zealand Albums (RMNZ)	5
Polish Albums (ZPAV)	22
Spanish Albums (Promusicae)	5
Swiss Albums (Schweizer Hitparade)	3
UK Albums (Official Charts)	2
US Billboard 200	5

=== Year-end charts ===
Chart (1970)	Position
Australian Albums Chart	6
UK Albums Chart	6
US Billboard Pop Albums	31
Chart (1972)	Position
Japanese Albums Chart	8
Chart (1973)	Position
Japanese Albums Chart	7

=== Decade-end charts ===
Chart (1970–1979)	Position
Japanese Albums Chart	7

== Certifications ==
Certifications and sales
Region	Certification	Certified units/sales
Argentina (CAPIF)	2× Platinum	120,000^{^}
Australia (ARIA)	Platinum	70,000^{^}
Canada (Music Canada)	4× Platinum	400,000^{‡}
Denmark (IFPI Danmark)	Platinum	20,000^{‡}
France (SNEP)	Gold	100,000^{*}
Italy (FIMI) sales since 2009	Gold	25,000^{‡}
New Zealand (RMNZ) Reissue	2× Platinum	30,000^{^}
United Kingdom (BPI)	Platinum	300,000^{‡}
United States (RIAA)	4× Platinum	4,000,000^{^}
^{*} Sales figures based on certification alone.^{^} Shipments figures based on certification alone.^{‡} Sales+streaming figures based on certification alone.

^{†} BPI certification awarded only for sales since 1994.

== See also ==
- Outline of the Beatles
- The Beatles timeline
- The Beatles albums discography
