= Anthology Collection =

- Box set with sleeve, the set without the sleeve on it looks identical to Anthology 4.

Box set by the Beatles
- Released: 21 November 2025
- Recorded: 12 July 1958 – 1 May 2022
- Genres: Merseybeat; rock; pop
- Length: 517:05
- Label: Apple
- Producers: George Martin (1962-1970 recordings); Jeff Lynne ("Free as a Bird", "Real Love" and "Now and Then"); Paul McCartney and Giles Martin ("Now and Then"); McCartney, John Lennon, George Harrison and Ringo Starr ("Real Love")

The Beatles chronology
Anthology 4 (2025)	Anthology Collection (2025)	Rubber Soul: Special Edition (2026)

Anthology Collection is a boxed set by English rock band the Beatles, released on 21 November 2025 as a part of the 30th anniversary of the Beatles Anthology series of archival material.

== Content ==
Anthology Collection contains all four Anthology albums, those being Anthology 1 (1995), Anthology 2 (1996), Anthology 3 (1996), and Anthology 4 (2025). The first three volumes were compiled by George Martin, and the fourth one was compiled by Martin's son Giles. All of the albums were remastered by Giles, with Jeff Lynne also creating new mixes of "Free as a Bird" and "Real Love" for Anthology 4.

== Release and promotion ==
Initially announced on 13 August 2025 on the band's website, music news outlets quickly promoted the upcoming release.

The box set was released on 21 November 2025, alongside Anthology 4, and the Anthology docuseries on Disney+ on 26 November. All of the releases coincided with the 30th anniversary edition of the Beatles Anthology.

== Reception ==
Professional ratings
Aggregate scores
Source	Rating
Metacritic	82/100
Review scores
Source	Rating
AllMusic	3.5/5 stars
Record Collector	4/5 stars
Rolling Stone	4.5/5 stars
Spill Magazine	5/5 stars
The Telegraph	2/5 stars
Uncut	9/10

Writing for Rolling Stone, Rob Sheffield concluded the set "bristles with that kind of nonstop restless creative spirit — the raw Hamburg punk rock of Volume One, the trippy studio experiments of Volume Two, [and] the mature world-weary grit of Volume Three." Tim Sendra noted in a review for AllMusic that "The added brightness and clarity given to the songs is a nice upgrade, so is the more compact packaging", concluding that "It will definitely appeal to Beatles' fans who don't have the original versions[,] and that seems like a very good reason for this set to exist."

== Charts ==
=== Weekly charts ===
Weekly chart performance for Anthology Collection
Chart (2025)	Peak position
Australian Albums (ARIA)	32
Austrian Albums (Ö3 Austria)	13
Belgian Albums (Ultratop Flanders)	21
Belgian Albums (Ultratop Wallonia)	73
Dutch Albums (Album Top 100)	13
Finnish Albums (Suomen virallinen lista)	38
French Albums (SNEP)	60
German Albums (Offizielle Top 100)	2
German Pop Albums (Offizielle Top 100)	1
Japanese Albums (Oricon)	15
Japanese Combined Albums (Oricon)	18
Japanese Rock Albums (Oricon)	3
Japanese Download Albums (Billboard Japan)	34
Japanese Top Albums Sales (Billboard Japan)	15
Norwegian Physical Albums (IFPI Norge)	2
Scottish Albums (Official Charts)	7
Swiss Albums (Schweizer Hitparade)	8
UK Albums (Official Charts)	29
US Billboard 200	113
US Top Rock & Alternative Albums (Billboard)	22

=== Monthly charts ===
Monthly chart performance for Anthology Collection
Chart (2025)	Position
Japanese Albums (Oricon)	40
Japanese Rock Albums (Oricon)	7

== See also ==
- The Beatles Anthology, 1995 TV series
- The Beatles Anthology, 2000 book
