= Thinking of Linking =

Unreleased song by The Beatles

"Thinking of Linking" is one of the first songs written by English musician Paul McCartney. Inspired by a cinema advertisement for Link Furniture, McCartney composed the song in 1958. The lyric consists of only three lines, while the music is influenced by the sound of Buddy Holly and the Crickets.

The predecessor to the Beatles, the Quarrymen, occasionally performed the song in the late 1950s, but no recording of this is known to exist. The Beatles played the song twice during the informal Get Back sessions in January 1969. Ex-Beatles McCartney, George Harrison and Ringo Starr recorded the song in June 1994 for The Beatles Anthology project. This version was not in the final documentary, but was included as a special feature when Apple Corps released the series on DVD in 2003.

== Background and composition ==
I remember once sitting with Paul in the cinema on the corner of Rose Lane, not far from where he lived, near Penny Lane. They showed an ad for Link Furniture: "Are you thinking of Linking?" Paul said, "Oh, that would make a good song", and he wrote one that went, "Thinking of linking my life with you".

— George Harrison, The Beatles Anthology

Paul McCartney wrote "Thinking of Linking" at his childhood home, 20 Forthlin Road, likely between January and May 1958. Having written several songs, he began making a conscious effort to listen for interesting phrases that could be used in a new composition. While attending the cinema with his friend and bandmate George Harrison, a commercial advertising Link Furniture caught his attention with its concluding tagline, "Are you thinking of linking?" In a 1987 interview with author Mark Lewisohn, McCartney recalled: "I came out of there thinking 'That should be a song. Thinking of linking, people are gonna get married, gotta write that!'"

Lewisohn writes that the only lyrics to the song are: "Well I've been thinking of linking my life with you / Thinking of linking a love so true / Thinking of linking can only be done by two." In the 1987 interview, McCartney describes the song as "terrible" and the lyrics as "[p]retty corny stuff!" Lewisohn writes that, like most of the music John Lennon and McCartney were writing at that time, its style is heavily indebted to the sound of Buddy Holly and the Crickets.

Author Chris Ingham writes that the song, along with the other early compositions "Just Fun" and "That's My Woman", has become part of the "mythical 'lost Beatles canon'", while music critic Tim Riley considers it one of the "embryos of the Lennon–McCartney catalogue", mixing "the derivative with the yet-to-come". Author Kenneth Womack calls it "corny, but truly lovable", while author Jonathan Gould opines that the song was "wisely consigned to the dustbin of musical history".

== Recording and release ==
The group which eventually became the Beatles, the Quarrymen, occasionally performed "Thinking of Linking", though no recording of them playing it is known to exist. (Note: In his 1992 book The Complete Beatles Chronicle, Lewisohn writes the Quarrymen performed the song from 1957 through 1959, but in his 2013 book Tune In, he writes the song was likely written sometime between January and May 1958.) In the 1970s, rumours began circulating that there existed a 1962 tape of the Beatles rehearsing several early songs, including "Thinking of Linking", but these claims are unsupported. In a 2005 interview with Lewisohn, Cliff Roberts, a singer and contemporary of the Beatles, recalled a van ride in the summer of 1962 where McCartney began singing "Thinking of Linking" and offered him exclusive use of the song. He further recalled that McCartney wrote the lyrics and chords on a piece of paper, but that he lost it and never performed the song.

The earliest recording of the song is of the Beatles during the January 1969 rehearsals for their planned Get Back project. Throughout the informal sessions, the band played several of their earliest compositions. On 3 January, while Lennon sang Irving Berlin's "A Pretty Girl Is Like a Melody", McCartney and Harrison began to sing "Thinking of Linking". The song stopped after one line because McCartney either forgot the words or lost interest. The song was next played on 29 January; while Lennon sang "Peggy Sue Got Married", he forgot the lyrics and instead substituted those of "Thinking of Linking".

In 1994, in anticipation of their upcoming project The Beatles Anthology, the three remaining ex-Beatles, McCartney, Harrison and Ringo Starr, planned to record a version of "Let It Be". (Note: The three were sometimes dubbed either the "Threatles" or the "Threetles".) On 23 June, they assembled at Harrison's Friar Park home, playing in his home studio, FPSHOT (Friar Park Studio, Henley-On-Thames), while being recorded on video with a two camera setup. They abandoned the idea of recording "Let It Be" due to Lennon's absence, instead opting to play several rock and roll oldies, including "Ain't She Sweet", "Love Me Do" and "Blue Moon of Kentucky", among others. They recorded what they could remember of "Thinking of Linking", playing on two acoustic guitars and brushes. The performance did not feature in the finished Anthology documentary series, but was included as a special-feature when Apple Corps released the series on DVD in 2003. McCartney played the song on an acoustic guitar for American record producer Rick Rubin in the 2021 Hulu docuseries McCartney 3, 2, 1.
