= Anthology 4 =

Compilation album by the Beatles
- Released: 21 November 2025
- Recorded: 11 February 1963–16 July 1969 c. 1977, July 1980, 1994–1995, 2021–2022 (Note: John Lennon's demos for "Free as a Bird" and "Now and Then" were recorded around 1977, and the demo for "Real Love" was recorded July 1980. The recordings of "Free as a Bird" and "Real Love" were finished by the surviving members of the band during February–March 1994 and February 1995 respectively. "Now and Then" was recorded on multiple occasions: 6 June 1966 (backing vocals from "Eleanor Rigby"); 14 June 1966 (backing vocals from "Here, There and Everywhere"); 4 August 1969 (backing vocals from "Because"); c. 1977 (Lennon's lead vocals); 2 February 1995 (George Harrison's acoustic and electric guitars); 2 February 2021 (Paul McCartney's guitar solo); 9 July 2021 (McCartney's bass lines); 12 July 2021 (McCartney's vocals); 9 April 2022 (Ringo Starr's drums); 1 May 2022 (orchestra))
- Genres: Merseybeat; rock; pop
- Length: 118:44
- Label: Apple
- Producers: Giles Martin; Jeff Lynne

The Beatles chronology
Beatles '64 (Music from the Disney+ Documentary) (2024)	Anthology 4 (2025)	Anthology Collection (2025)

Singles from Anthology 4
- 1. "Free as a Bird (2025 Mix)" Released: 21 August 2025; 2. "Helter Skelter (Second Version: Take 17)" Released: 18 September 2025; 3. "While My Guitar Gently Weeps (Third Version: Take 27)" Released: 3 October 2025; 4. "I've Just Seen a Face (Take 3)" Released: 24 October 2025; 5. "In My Life (Take 1)" Released: 15 November 2025

Professional ratings
Aggregate scores
Source	Rating
Metacritic	86/100
Review scores
Source	Rating
AllMusic	3.5/5 stars
All About Jazz	4/5 stars
Clash	8/10
Classic Rock	2/5 stars
Mojo	5/5 stars
Rolling Stone	4.5/5 stars
The Telegraph	2/5 stars

Anthology 4 is a compilation album featuring both previously released and unreleased material by the English rock band The Beatles, issued by Apple Records on 21 November 2025. Part of the multimedia retrospective series The Beatles Anthology, it was conceived as an expansion of the series' 30th-anniversary remastered re-issue. Similarly to the three original volumes—Anthology 1 (1995), Anthology 2 (1996), and Anthology 3 (1996)—Anthology 4 features outtakes from the Beatles recording sessions between 1963 and 1969.

Notably, Anthology 4 introduces new remixes of "Free as a Bird" (1995) and "Real Love" (1996), with machine-learning-assisted audio restoration technology used to extract John Lennon's vocals from his demos, as it was utilised on "Now and Then" (2023), also featured on the album.

The physical edition was originally planned to be exclusive to Anthology Collection, a box set featuring all four volumes, but after fan backlash, it was released as a standalone 2-CD/3-LP release as well.

== Background ==
On 19 August, both the Beatles' website and social media pages teased the album. The teasers featured the numbers 1 to 4, with the website cycling through the numbers, and the Instagram post being a slideshow, filling the numbers with the covers of previous Anthology albums.

On 21 August, the album and box set was officially announced. It was released on 26 November alongside the Disney+ three-episode premiere of the remastered and expanded documentary series The Beatles Anthology.

== Content ==
The album contains 13 previously unreleased tracks, alongside 23 tracks that had been previously released. It also contains new mixes of "Free as a Bird" and "Real Love", utilising machine-assisted learning audio restoration technology to extract Lennon's vocals, the same technique used for "Now and Then", which also features on the album. Both songs were remixed by Jeff Lynne.

== Reception ==
Following the album announcement, Anthology 4 was widely criticised as, unlike the other Anthology albums, it mostly consists of previously released material, instead of previously unreleased content, such as McCartney's 1967 avant-garde piece "Carnival of Light". The album also does not contain any highly requested outtakes, such as "Revolution" take 20 or "Helter Skelter" take 3, which fans were hoping for. The album was also initially criticised for its only physical option for pre-order being to buy an expensive box set containing all four volumes. The album was eventually given a standalone option.

"Free as a Bird"'s 2025 mix was considered by many critics to be an improvement over the original, though the vocals were seen as a matter of contention, with some praising its far clearer sound and others believing it lost the charm of the original track. "Real Love", on the other hand, received negative reviews from fans and critics due to the mixing of Lennon's vocals, the removal of Harrison's guitar phrases during the choruses and its length being shortened from 3:54 to 3:34.

== Track listing ==
All tracks are written by Lennon–McCartney, except where noted.

Disc one
No.	Title	Writer(s)	Original release	Length
1.	"I Saw Her Standing There" (Take 2)		The Beatles Bootleg Recordings 1963	3:06
2.	"Money (That's What I Want)" (RM7 undubbed)	Berry Gordy; Janie Bradford	The Beatles Bootleg Recordings 1963	2:48
3.	"This Boy" (Takes 12 & 13)		Free as a Bird CD Single	3:18
4.	"Tell Me Why" (Takes 4 & 5)			3:07
5.	"If I Fell" (Take 11)			2:38
6.	"Matchbox" (Take 1)	Carl Perkins		2:09
7.	"Every Little Thing" (Takes 6 & 7)			3:28
8.	"I Need You" (Take 1)	George Harrison		2:36
9.	"I've Just Seen a Face" (Take 3)			2:26
10.	"In My Life" (Take 1)			2:40
11.	"Nowhere Man" (First version – Take 2)			2:24
12.	"Got to Get You into My Life" (Second version – Unnumbered mono mix)		Revolver: Special Edition	2:35
13.	"Love You To" (Take 7)	Harrison	Revolver: Special Edition	2:56
14.	"Strawberry Fields Forever" (Take 26)		Sgt. Pepper's Lonely Hearts Club Band: 50th Anniversary Edition	3:20
15.	"She's Leaving Home" (Take 1 – Instrumental)		Sgt. Pepper's Lonely Hearts Club Band: 50th Anniversary Edition	3:50
16.	"Baby, You're a Rich Man" (Takes 11 & 12)			6:06
17.	"All You Need Is Love" (Rehearsal for BBC broadcast)			6:11
18.	"The Fool on the Hill" (Take 5 – Instrumental)			4:42
19.	"I Am the Walrus" (Take 19 – Strings, brass, clarinet overdub)			4:56

Disc two
No.	Title	Writer(s)	Original release	Length
1.	"Hey Bulldog" (Take 4 – Instrumental)			3:14
2.	"Good Night" (Take 10 with a guitar part from Take 5)		The Beatles: 50th Anniversary Edition	2:31
3.	"While My Guitar Gently Weeps" (Third version – Take 27)	Harrison	The Beatles: 50th Anniversary Edition	3:18
4.	"(You're So Square) Baby I Don't Care" (Studio jam)	Jerry Leiber; Mike Stoller	The Beatles: 50th Anniversary Edition	0:43
5.	"Helter Skelter" (Second version – Take 17)		The Beatles: 50th Anniversary Edition	3:38
6.	"I Will" (Take 29)		The Beatles: 50th Anniversary Edition	0:26
7.	"Can You Take Me Back?" (Take 1)		The Beatles: 50th Anniversary Edition	2:22
8.	"Julia" (Two rehearsals)		The Beatles: 50th Anniversary Edition	4:26
9.	"Get Back" (Take 8)		Let It Be: Special Edition	3:51
10.	"Octopus's Garden" (Rehearsal)	Richard Starkey	Let It Be: Special Edition	1:49
11.	"Don't Let Me Down" (First rooftop performance)		Let It Be: Special Edition	3:27
12.	"You Never Give Me Your Money" (Take 36)		Abbey Road: 50th Anniversary Edition	5:17
13.	"Here Comes the Sun" (Take 9)	Harrison	Abbey Road: 50th Anniversary Edition	3:41
14.	"Something" (Take 39 – instrumental – strings only)	Harrison	Abbey Road: 50th Anniversary Edition	2:35
15.	"Free as a Bird" (2025 Mix)	Lennon; McCartney; Harrison; Starkey		4:27
16.	"Real Love" (2025 Mix)	Lennon		3:34
17.	"Now and Then"	Lennon; McCartney; Harrison; Starkey	Single and 2023 reissue of 1967–1970	4:09

== Charts ==
=== Weekly charts ===
Weekly chart performance for Anthology 4
Chart (2025–2026)	Peak position
Australian Albums (ARIA)	20
Austrian Albums (Ö3 Austria)	10
Belgian Albums (Ultratop Flanders)	17
Belgian Albums (Ultratop Wallonia)	31
Canadian Albums (Billboard)	83
Croatian International Albums (HDU)	17
Dutch Albums (Album Top 100)	8
French Albums (SNEP)	56
German Albums (Offizielle Top 100)	9
German Rock & Metal Albums (Offizielle Top 100)	1
Greek Albums (IFPI)	20
Irish Albums (Official Charts)	29
Japanese Albums (Oricon)	16
Japanese Combined Albums (Oricon)	17
Japanese Rock Albums (Oricon)	4
Japanese Hot Albums (Billboard Japan)	51
New Zealand Albums (RMNZ)	33
Norwegian Physical Albums (IFPI Norge)	3
Polish Albums (ZPAV)	81
Portuguese Albums (AFP)	116
Scottish Albums (Official Charts)	4
Spanish Albums (Promusicae)	21
Swedish Albums (Sverigetopplistan)	10
Swiss Albums (Schweizer Hitparade)	7
UK Albums (Official Charts)	9
US Billboard 200	48
US Top Rock & Alternative Albums (Billboard)	7

=== Monthly charts ===
Monthly chart performance for Anthology 4
Chart (2025)	Position
Japanese Albums (Oricon)	37
Japanese Rock Albums (Oricon)	6
