= Free as a Bird =

1995 single by the Beatles

Single by the Beatles

from the album Anthology 1
- B-side: "Christmas Time (Is Here Again)"
- Released: 4 December 1995
- Recorded: c. 1977: February–March 1994
- Studio: The Dakota (New York City); Hogg Hill Mill (Icklesham, UK)
- Genre: Rock; soft rock
- Length: 4:26
- Label: Apple
- Songwriters: Original composition by Lennon; the Beatles version by Lennon, McCartney, Harrison and Starkey
- Producers: Jeff Lynne; John Lennon; Paul McCartney; George Harrison; Ringo Starr

The Beatles singles chronology
"Baby It's You" (1995)	"Free as a Bird" (1995)	"Real Love" (1996)

Music video
- "Free as a Bird" on YouTube

Audio sample
- file; help

"Free as a Bird" is a single released in December 1995 by English rock band the Beatles. The song was originally written and recorded in 1977 as a home demo by John Lennon. In 1995, 25 years after their break-up and 15 years after Lennon's murder, his then surviving bandmates Paul McCartney, George Harrison and Ringo Starr released a studio version incorporating the demo.

The single was released by Apple Records as part of the promotion for The Beatles Anthology video documentary and the Anthology 1 compilation album. For the Anthology project, McCartney asked Lennon's widow Yoko Ono for unreleased material by Lennon to which the three remaining ex-Beatles could contribute. "Free as a Bird" was one of three such songs (along with "Real Love" and, decades later, "Now and Then") for which McCartney, Harrison and Starr contributed additional instrumentation, vocals and arrangements. Jeff Lynne, who had worked with Harrison on Harrison's album Cloud Nine and as part of the Traveling Wilburys, co-produced.

The accompanying music video was produced by Vincent Joliet and directed by Joe Pytka. Shot from the point of view of a bird in flight, it includes allusions to numerous Beatles songs. The song peaked at No. 2 on the UK Singles Chart and No. 6 on the US Billboard Hot 100. It also became a top-ten hit in at least 10 other countries, including Australia, Canada, Hungary and Sweden. It won the 1997 Grammy Award for Best Pop Performance by a Duo or Group with Vocal and was the Beatles' 34th top-ten single in the United States, giving the group at least one Top 40 hit in four different decades.

In August 2025, a remastered remix of "Free as a Bird" was released digitally, which used AI audio restoration technology to extract and clean up Lennon's vocals, for release on Anthology 4.

== Origins ==
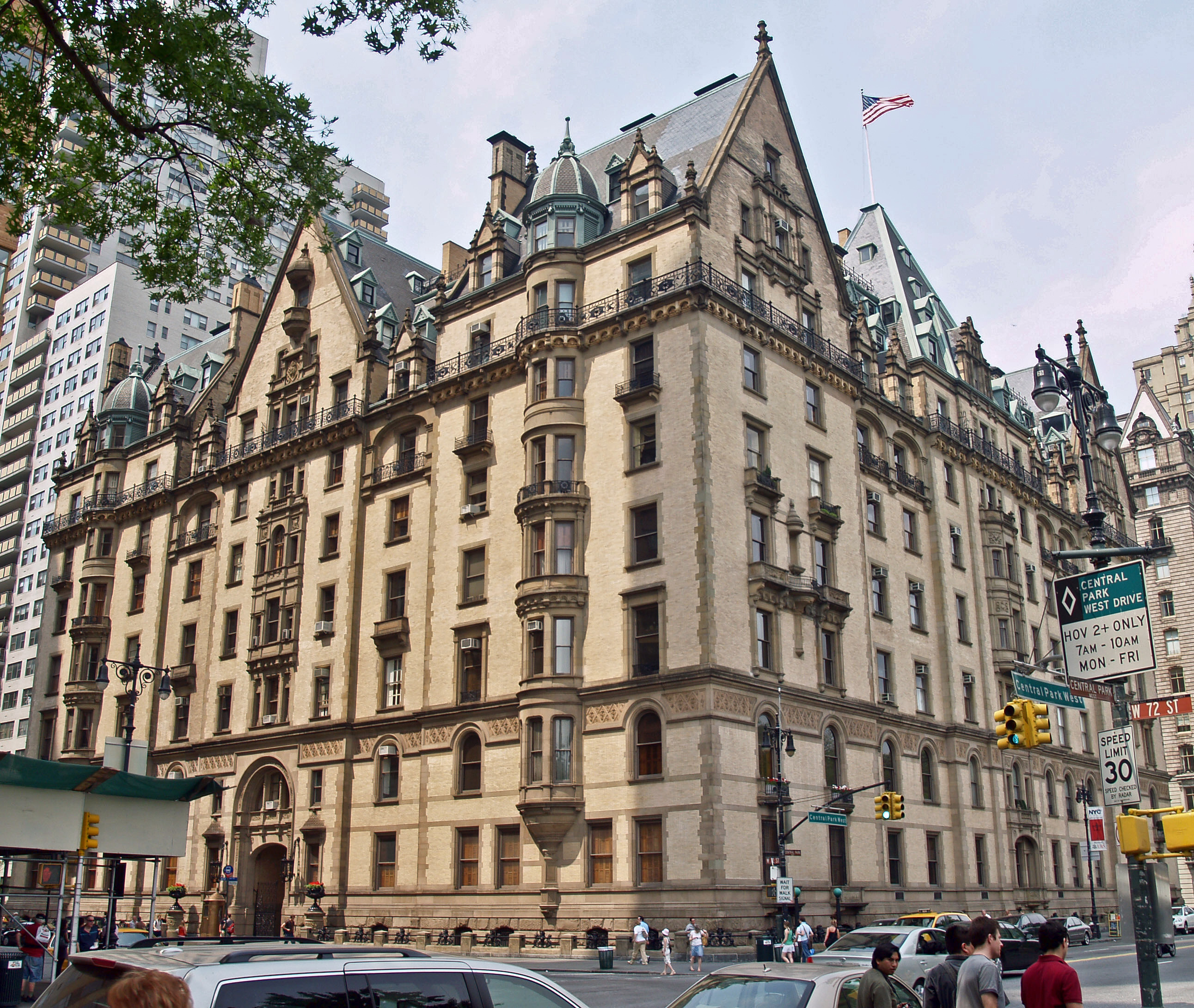
The Dakota building, where Lennon lived and composed, and where he recorded a demo of the song on cassette

In the 1990s the surviving members of the Beatles, Paul McCartney, George Harrison and Ringo Starr, originally intended to record some incidental background music, as a trio, for the Anthology project, but later realised, according to Starr, that they wanted to record "new music". According to Harrison, they had always agreed that if one of them was not in the band, the others would never replace him and agreed that the "only other person that could be in it was John".

McCartney then asked Ono if she had any unreleased recordings by Lennon, so she sent him cassette tapes of four songs. "Free as a Bird" was recorded by Lennon in 1977, in his and Ono's Dakota building apartment in New York City, but was not complete. Lennon introduced the song on the cassette by imitating a New York accent and saying, "Free—as a boid" (bird). The other songs were "Grow Old With Me", "Real Love" and "Now and Then". Ono says that it was Harrison and former Beatles road manager Neil Aspinall who initially asked her about the concept of adding vocals and instrumentation to Lennon's demo tapes. Ono stated "People have said it was all agreed when Paul came over to New York to induct John into the Rock and Roll Hall of Fame, but it was all settled before then. I just used that occasion to hand over the tapes personally to Paul."

McCartney went to Ono's home after the induction ceremony at the Rock and Roll Hall of Fame to listen to, and receive, the Lennon demo tapes; he recalls the meeting with Ono:

She was there with Sean ... and she played us a couple of tracks. There were two newies on mono cassettes which he did at home ... [s]o I checked it out with Sean, because I didn't want him to have a problem with it. He said, "Well, it'll be weird hearing a dead guy on lead vocal. But give it a try." I said to them both, "If it doesn't work out, you can veto it." When I told George and Ringo I'd agreed to that they were going, "What? What if we love it?" It didn't come to that, luckily. I said to Yoko, "Don't impose too many conditions on us, it's really difficult to do this, spiritually. We don't know, we may hate each other after two hours in the studio and just walk out. So don't put any conditions, it's tough enough."

Ono recognised that she was now in a position of bringing the band back together after previously being criticised for splitting them up.

During an interview for the Anthology project, McCartney revealed that he was surprised to learn that Lennon's demos of "Grow Old With Me" and "Real Love" had already been released and were well known by Lennon fans. Starr admitted that when he first listened to the recording he found it very emotional.

=== Recording ===
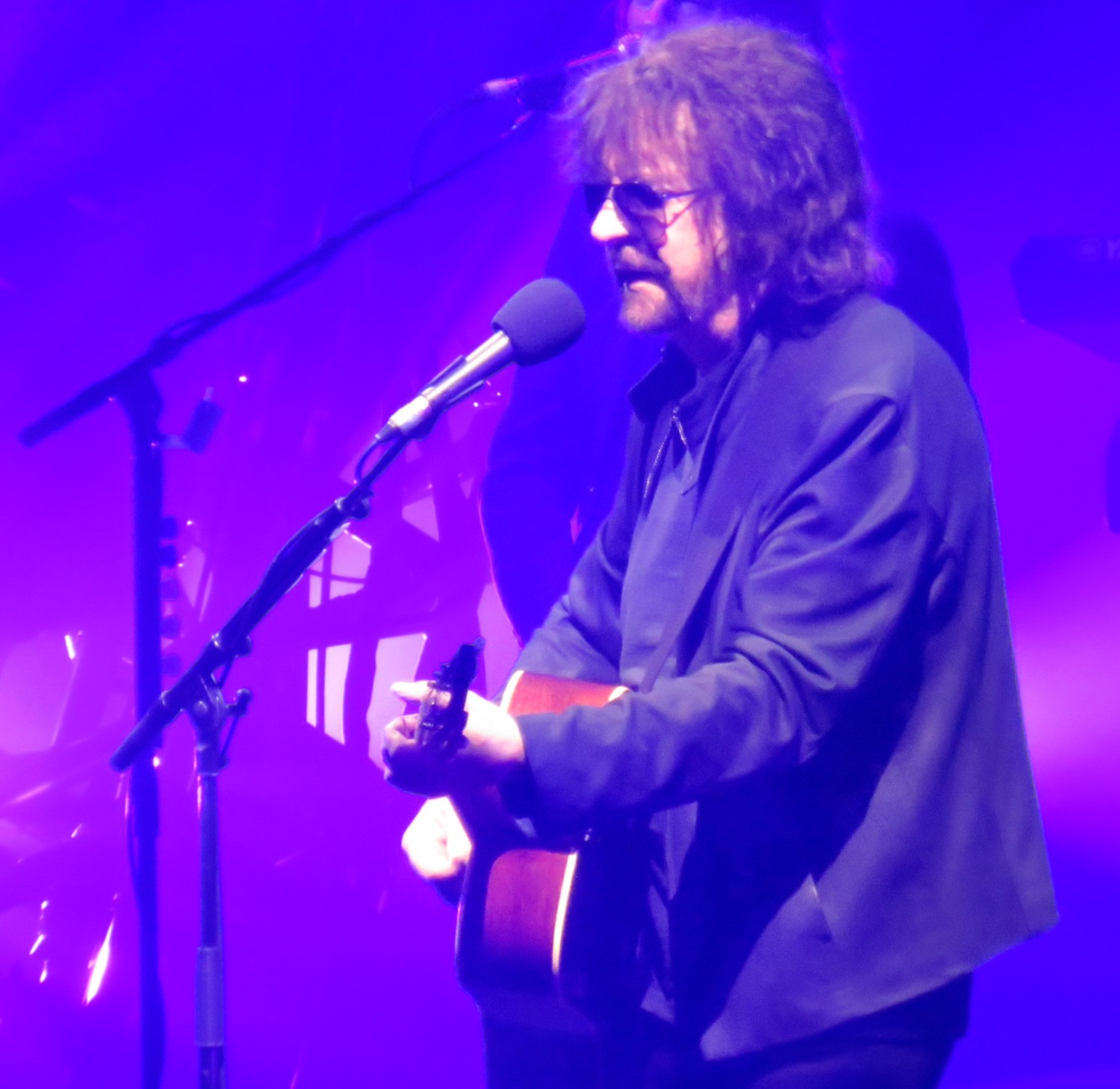
"Free as a Bird" producer Jeff Lynne in 2016

George Martin, who had produced most of the Beatles' 1960s recordings, turned down an invitation to produce "Free as a Bird" due to hearing problems (though he subsequently managed to produce and direct the Anthology series). Harrison suggested Jeff Lynne (founding member of Electric Light Orchestra and co-producer of Harrison's 1987 album, Cloud Nine) as producer, and work commenced at McCartney's studio in February 1994. Harrison expressed a desire to work with Lynne or he would not involve himself in the project. Geoff Emerick and Jon Jacobs were chosen to engineer the new tracks.

The original 1977 tape of Lennon singing the song was recorded on a mono cassette, with vocals and piano on the same track. They were impossible to separate with the technology at the time, so Lynne had to produce the track with voice and piano together, but commented that it was good for the integrity of the project, as Lennon was not only singing occasional lines, but also playing on the song.

Although Lennon had died in 1980, Starr said that the three remaining Beatles agreed they would pretend that Lennon had "gone for lunch", or had gone for a "cup of tea". The remaining Beatles recorded a track around Lennon's basic song idea, but which had gaps they had to fill in musically. Some chords were changed, and the arrangement was expanded to include breaks for McCartney and Harrison to sing extra lines. Harrison played slide guitar in the solo.

The Beatles' overdubs and production were recorded between February and March 1994 in Sussex, England, at McCartney's home studio. Harrison ended the song with a homage to George Formby, a Northern English comedian who the Beatles were fans of, adding a slight coda with a strummed banjo ukulele, and an archive recording of John Lennon saying "turned out nice again!", Formby's catchphrase, played backwards. The final result sounds like "made by John Lennon", which, according to McCartney, was unintentional and was only discovered after the surviving Beatles reviewed the final mix. When Starr heard McCartney and Harrison singing the harmonies, and later the finished song, he said that it sounded just like them [the Beatles]. He explained his comment by saying that he looked at the project as "an outsider". Lynne fully expected the finished track to sound like the Beatles, as that was his premise for the project, but Harrison added "It's gonna sound like them if it is them ... It sounds like them now."

McCartney, Harrison and Starr all agreed that the recording process was more pleasurable than when they later recorded "Real Love" (the second song chosen for release); as the latter was almost finished, they had very little input, and felt like sidemen for Lennon.

== Music video ==
The music video for "Free as a Bird" was produced by Vincent Joliet and directed by Joe Pytka and contains, from the point of view of a bird in flight, many references to Beatles songs, such as "Penny Lane", "Paperback Writer", "A Day in the Life", "Eleanor Rigby", "Helter Skelter", "Piggies", "The Continuing Story of Bungalow Bill", "Strawberry Fields Forever", "Doctor Robert" and "The Fool on the Hill". It has been estimated that the video includes between 80 and 100 allusions to the Beatles' story, music and lyrics. Although the bird can be heard at the beginning of the video, it is never seen. Neil Aspinall (Apple Records executive at the time) said that this was because no-one could agree on what kind of bird it should be. Pytka had to send his ideas to McCartney, Harrison and Starr, as well as Ono, to make sure they all agreed before he could proceed with the filming of the video. Derek Taylor (ex-Apple Records executive) sent a two-page letter to Pytka confirming that he could proceed, and personally encouraged and supported Pytka's ideas. The video was filmed in as many authentic locations as possible: Penny Lane was made by Pytka's art department to look as it was in the 1950s, and other locations filmed were The Liver Building and Liverpool Docks (as a reference to Lennon's father Alfred Lennon).

Although Pytka fixed the ideas on a storyboard, he abandoned it as soon as filming began, and followed ideas based on what angles and perspectives the Steadicam camera produced. One instance was the filming of the car crash, which Pytka filmed for hours from above, but realised that a Steadicam shot on the ground was a much better idea. The inclusion of the car registration number 847 BHN on a police van in the "A Day in the Life" crash sequence alludes to John and Yoko's commitment to the case of James Hanratty, hanged in 1962 for the A6 murder (then a contentious case, but proven guilty by DNA evidence in 2002). Archiveage was used by imposing it on scenes shot by Pytka, who utilised a greenscreen stage to digitally blend it into the finished film, such as Paul's Old English Sheepdog in the graveyard, and the elephant in the ballroom procession scene. The elephant was put in last, as Aspinall phoned Pytka and said that Starr liked the scene, but insisted an elephant be put in it, which Pytka later did, as he had already put a sitar in at the request of Harrison. Apart from the Steadicam shots, Pytka used a Russian-made Akela-crane for sweeping overhead shots, such as the Abbey Road zebra crossing shot at the end, as well as a remote-controlled toy helicopter with a camera added to it for intricate aerial shots. To make it more interesting, two Blue Meanies make cameos.

Harrison played the ukulele in the studio for the song, and asked to appear as the Formby-style ukulele player seen only from behind at the very end of the video. Pytka resisted this, as he felt it would be wrong for any contemporary members of the Beatles to appear on screen. Pytka later stated that it was "heartbreaking" that Harrison had not played the role, particularly after Harrison's death in 2001 and upon discovering that the ukulele was not a sample as Pytka had assumed. The video won the Grammy Award for Best Short Form Music Video in 1997.

To promote the expanded 30th-anniversary edition of The Beatles Anthology, the video would receive a 4K remaster by Peter Jackson's post-production company, Park Road Post, who previously work on The Beatles: Get Back and Beatles '64. This would be uploaded on to the band's YouTube channel on 21 August, replacing the original 2016 upload and the audio, which originally used the mix on 1+, was replaced with the 2025 remix.

== Later remixes ==
=== 2015 remix ===
On 6 November 2015, Apple Records released a new deluxe version of the 1 album in different editions and variations (known as 1+). Most of the tracks on 1 were remixed from the original multi-track masters by Giles Martin, who, with Jeff Lynne, also remixed "Free as a Bird" to accompany the music video for the DVD and Blu-ray releases. The remix of "Free as a Bird" cleans up Lennon's vocal further, and uses a different take of Harrison's vocal phrase, replacing the lyric "whatever happened to the life that we once knew" with "whatever happened to the love that we once knew". The clip of Lennon saying "turned out nice again" was switched to play forward. McCartney's lead vocal, buried in the original mix to serve as a double-track for Lennon's own vocal, can now be heard more prominently in the second verse.

=== 2025 remix ===
On 21 August 2025, a new remix of "Free as a Bird" was released digitally. The remix was done by Lynne and employed audio restoration technology to isolate Lennon's vocals. The remix serves as a precursor to an expanded 30th-anniversary edition of The Beatles Anthology, which released on 21 November 2025. The remix was met with mixed reception, with some praising Lennon's clearer vocals, and others believing that the previous sounds of Lennon's vocals were superior. The new mix was later released as a limited edition AA-side single alongside the new mix of "Real Love" on 28 November.

== Critical reception ==
"Free as a Bird" marked the first time a single containing new material had been released under the Beatles' name since "The Long and Winding Road" in the United States in 1970. The promotional video was broadcast during episode one of The Beatles Anthology that aired on ITV in the UK and ABC in the US.

"Free as a Bird" was greeted with mixed reviews. Its release was criticised by Caroline Sullivan in The Guardian as a publicity gimmick, exploiting the Beatles brand, and owing less to the Beatles than to Lynne. Andy Gill in The Independent called the song "disappointingly low-key. ... George's guitar weeps gently enough when required, but the overall effect is of a dirge." Ben Willmott from NME viewed it as "a mournful dirge of a tune, overlaid with a grimly slick guitar on loan from Dire Straits and with Macca wanting to know Can we really live without each other?". Jordan Paramor from Smash Hits gave it four out of five, writing, "Instead, hide in your room for a few listens, 'cos it's a classy, laid-back Beatles anthem – with fantastic twangy guitar – to be enjoyed well away from anyone even remotely nostalgic!" Ian MacDonald, writer of Revolution in the Head, declared it to be a "dreary song" that stood no comparison with the Beatles' sixties music. Chris Carter, host of Breakfast with the Beatles, commented: "I would value any song (especially if it was great) performed by John, Paul, George and Ringo, no matter how (or when) it was recorded." "Free as a Bird" won the Grammy Award for Best Pop Performance by a Duo or Group with Vocal in 1997.

== Release and chart performance ==
"Free as a Bird" was premiered on BBC Radio 1 in the early hours of 20 November 1995 and was sent to US contemporary hit radio stations the following day. It was released as a single on CD, cassette and 7-inch vinyl in the UK on 4 December 1995, two weeks after its appearance on the Anthology 1 album. The single sold 120,000 copies in its first week, entering the UK Singles Chart at No. 2. It remained on the chart for eight weeks. In the US, the song was released on 12 December 1995 and reached No. 6 on the Billboard Hot 100, becoming the Beatles' 34th Top 10 single in America. It was the group's first Top 10 song in the US since 1976, and also their first new single since their final number one hit on that chart in 1970.

The CD and vinyl cover art is by John Lennon, taken from his 1964 book In His Own Write.

== Formats and track listings ==
All songs written by John Lennon, Paul McCartney, George Harrison and Ringo Starr, except where noted.

7-inch single (UK: R6422 / USA: NR-58497)

1. "Free as a Bird" – 4:26
2. "Christmas Time (Is Here Again)" – 3:02
  - Music recorded 28 November 1967 at EMI Studios, London; Christmas greetings recorded 6 December 1966 at EMI Studios, London; originally released on the Beatles' 1967 fan club Christmas record, Christmas Time Is Here Again!

CD (UK: CDR6422 / USA: CDP 58497)

1. "Free as a Bird" – 4:26
2. "I Saw Her Standing There" (Lennon–McCartney) – 2:51
  - Recorded 11 February 1963 at EMI Studios, London
  - Produced by George Martin
  - This version (take 9) was recorded after the version released on the album Please Please Me (take 1). The introductory count-in from take 9 was edited onto the start of take 1 for the album.
3. "This Boy" (Lennon–McCartney) – 3:17
  - Recorded 17 October 1963 at EMI Studios, London
  - Produced by George Martin
  - Two incomplete versions (takes 12 and 13), which both break down into laughter.
4. "Christmas Time (Is Here Again)" – 3:02

== Personnel ==
According to Ian MacDonald:

- John Lennon – lead vocals, piano (from 1977 recording)
- Paul McCartney – lead and harmony vocals, bass, acoustic guitar, synthesizer, piano
- George Harrison – lead and harmony vocals, slide guitar, acoustic guitar, ukulele
- Ringo Starr – drums, backing vocals
- Jeff Lynne – backing vocals, electric guitar

== Charts ==
=== Weekly charts ===
Weekly chart performance for "Free as a Bird"
Chart (1995–1996)	Peak position
Australia (ARIA)	6
Austria (Ö3 Austria Top 40)	32
Belgium (Ultratop 50 Flanders)	11
Belgium (Ultratop 50 Wallonia)	12
Canada Top Singles (RPM)	7
Canada Adult Contemporary (RPM)	4
Denmark (IFPI)	4
Europe (Eurochart Hot 100)	3
Europe (European Hit Radio)	4
Finland (Suomen virallinen lista)	7
France (SNEP)	23
Germany (GfK)	37
Hungary (Mahasz)	2
Iceland (Íslenski Listinn Topp 40)	5
Ireland (IRMA)	5
Israel (Israeli Singles Chart)	25
Italy (Musica e dischi)	5
Italy Airplay (Music & Media)	4
Netherlands (Dutch Top 40)	10
Netherlands (Single Top 100)	9
New Zealand (Recorded Music NZ)	26
Norway (VG-lista)	14
Scottish Singles Sales (Official Charts)	1
Spain (AFYVE)	10
Sweden (Sverigetopplistan)	3
Switzerland (Schweizer Hitparade)	25
UK Singles (Official Charts)	2
US Billboard Hot 100	6
US Adult Contemporary (Billboard)	19
US Adult Pop Airplay (Billboard)	22
US Mainstream Rock Airplay (Billboard)	8
US Pop Airplay (Billboard)	36
US Cash Box Top 100	37

2025 weekly chart performance for "Free as a Bird"
Chart (2025)	Peak position
Japan (Japan Hot 100)	78
Japan (Oricon)	16
Japan Rock Singles (Oricon)	3

=== Year-end charts ===
1995 year-end chart performance for "Free as a Bird"
Chart (1995)	Position
Sweden (Topplistan)	66
UK Singles (OCC)	42

1996 year-end chart performance for "Free as a Bird"
Chart (1996)	Position
Canada Top Singles (RPM)	70
Canada Adult Contemporary (RPM)	49

== Certifications ==
Certifications and sales for "Free as a Bird"
Region	Certification	Certified units/sales
United Kingdom (BPI)	Silver	200,000^{^}
United States (RIAA)	Gold	500,000^{^}
^{^} Shipments figures based on certification alone.

== Release history ==
Release dates and formats for "Free as a Bird"
Region	Date	Format(s)	Label(s)	Ref.
United States	21 November 1995	Contemporary hit radio	Apple; Capitol	
United Kingdom	4 December 1995	7-inch vinyl; CD; cassette	Apple	
United States	12 December 1995	7-inch vinyl; CD; cassette	Apple; Capitol	
Japan	1 January 1996	CD	Apple; Capitol	

== Bibliography ==
- The Beatles (2003). The Beatles Anthology (DVD). Apple Records. ASIN B00008GKEG.
- The Beatles (2002). The Beatles Anthology. San Francisco: Chronicle Books. ISBN 978-0-8118-3636-4.
- Everett, Walter (1999). The Beatles As Musicians: Revolver through the Anthology. New York: Oxford University Press. ISBN 978-0-19-512941-0.
- Harry, Bill (2000a). The Beatles Encyclopedia: Revised and Updated. London: Virgin. ISBN 978-0-7535-0481-9.
- Harry, Bill (2000b). The John Lennon Encyclopedia. London: Virgin. ISBN 978-0-7535-0404-8.
- Harry, Bill (2002). The Paul McCartney Encyclopedia. London: Virgin. ISBN 978-0-7535-0716-2.
- MacDonald, Ian (1997). Revolution in the Head: The Beatles' Records and the Sixties. Pimlico / Random House. ISBN 978-0-7126-6697-8.
- Sawyers, June Skinner, ed. (2006). Read the Beatles: Classic and New Writings on the Beatles, Their Legacy, and Why They Still Matter. USA: Penguin (Non-Classics). ISBN 978-0-14-303732-3.
