= The Beatles Anthology (TV series) =

Special television series by the Beatles

- Genre: Music documentary
- Written by: Bob Smeaton
- Directed by: Geoff Wonfor; Bob Smeaton; Oliver Murray
- Starring: John Lennon; Paul McCartney; George Harrison; Ringo Starr
- Theme music composer: The Beatles; George Martin
- Country of origin: United Kingdom
- Original language: English
- No. of episodes: 9

Production
- Producers: Neil Aspinall; Chips Chipperfield
- Running time: 11:23:24
- Production company: Apple Corps

Original release
- Network: ABC (United States)
- Release: 19 November – 23 November 1995
- Network: ITV (United Kingdom)
- Release: 26 November – 31 December 1995
- Network: Disney+ (Episode 9)
- Release: 28 November 2025

The Beatles Anthology is a documentary television series on the career of the Beatles. It was broadcast on UK television in six parts on ITV between 26 November and 31 December 1995, while in the United States it was seen as three feature-length episodes on ABC between 19 and 23 November 1995. It was released in greatly expanded form as an eight-volume VHS set and an eight-disc LaserDisc set on 5 September 1996. The series was re-released on DVD in 2003, with an 81-minute special-features disc. A re-edited version of the series was released on Disney+ starting on 26 November 2025, with an additional episode.

== Production history ==
=== The Long and Winding Road ===
An official documentary on the Beatles career had been in the pipeline as early as 1970. Long-time friend and Apple Corps manager Neil Aspinall had compiled footage of concert, interview, and television appearances from various sources around the world. From this archival footage, he assembled a 90-minute feature film which was tentatively titled The Long and Winding Road and was completed in 1971. At that point, none of the former members had been involved in the project. Eric Idle was given a screening of the film by George Harrison in the late 1970s as research for Idle's mockumentary All You Need Is Cash.

Plans for the documentary's release lay dormant until 1980, when John Lennon made a statement as part of a legal deposition against the producers of the musical Beatlemania. "I and the other three former Beatles have plans to stage a reunion concert", he said, referring to an event that was to be filmed as a finale of The Long and Winding Road (which was now to be a television special). According to Yoko Ono, the concert would have been held in England: "Just days before he was killed, Lennon was making plans to go to England for a triumphant Beatles reunion. His greatest dream was to recreate the musical magic of the early years with Paul, George and Ringo... (he) felt that they had traveled different paths for long enough. He felt they had grown up and were mature enough to try writing and recording new songs." The alleged plan for a reunion was abandoned after Lennon died on 8 December.

In 2015, Aspinall's 1970 workprint for The Long and Winding Road surfaced in a bootleg DVD which may be viewed on the Internet Archive.

=== Project resurrected ===
In 1992, the project was resurrected as a six-part documentary series. This time, the surviving members were directly involved, giving interviews on film with Jools Holland. Lennon's interviews were sourced from archived footage. Also interviewed were insiders Aspinall, the band's press agent Derek Taylor, and their long-time producer George Martin. The title of the documentary was now changed to The Beatles Anthology, as George Harrison was against naming the entire Beatles career after a Paul McCartney song. This new title was to be a working one but it eventually stayed, as it suited the parties concerned.

A rough cut was completed in 1993 which was much more interview-based and focused on events, as opposed to the final cut, which included more concert and television performances. The early version of the series has since leaked and released via bootleg.

=== New music ===
The plans for a concert were abandoned and replaced with the intention that the surviving three members would play some incidental music in between segments and interviews. It was thought the remaining Beatles should write new songs for the project. Both McCartney and Harrison wrote some material which became the song "All For Love", but it was then decided to ask Yoko Ono if Lennon had left any unfinished material that they could work with. Ono gave McCartney cassette tapes in 1994 after they appeared together on stage at Lennon's induction to the Rock and Roll Hall of Fame. The tapes contained four song demos that Lennon had been working on: "Free as a Bird", "Real Love", "Now and Then" and "Grow Old With Me". "Now and Then" was left unfinished at the time but "Free as a Bird" and "Real Love" were completed with producer Jeff Lynne in 1994–95 and premiered during the Anthology's initial broadcast. "Now and Then" was later completed in 2023.

== Releases ==
=== 1995 ABC broadcast ===
The documentary was first broadcast on American television in three feature-length episodes comprising six abridged parts (two per episode) on Sunday 19 November, Wednesday 22 November, and Thursday 23 November 1995. It aired from 9 pm to 11 pm on ABC. ABC re-aired the documentary to promote the VHS release in 1996. The Anthology was first shown on American television on ABC; the tagline for the network during the time was "A Beatles C", an homage to the mid-1960s "77 W-A-Beatles-C" call sign of the network's flagship NYC AM radio station.

=== 1995 ITV broadcast ===
The documentary was broadcast on UK television network ITV in six individual episodes instead of two parts per episode on ABC. Starting on 26 November 1995, it would air every Sunday (expect for episode five, as it aired on Tuesday 26 December) until 31 December.

=== 1996 VHS/LaserDisc and 2003 DVD release ===
On 5 September 1996, an expanded version of the documentary was released as an eight-volume VHS set and an eight-disc LaserDisc set. This version includes 5 hours of additional footage. In 2003, the expanded version was released as a 5-DVD boxset, and included an 81-minute special-features disc and the soundtrack was remixed into 5.1 Dolby Digital and DTS surround sound.

=== 2025 Disney+ release ===
In 2025, a re-edited version of the documentary, called Anthology 2025, was released on Disney+ with all eight episodes plus a brand new ninth episode focusing on Paul, George, and Ringo working on the Anthology from 1994 to 1995, all remastered in 4K and remixed to Dolby Atmos. Episodes 1–3 were first released on 26 November 2025, followed by episodes 4–6 on 27 November, and finally episodes 7–9 came out on 28 November. The episodes had some footage removed, trimmed, rearranged, or added commentary, causing the runtime of all the episodes combined to be an hour shorter than the expanded version.

== Reception ==
=== Viewership ===
On ABC, Part 1 reached 17 million households, gaining about 27.3 million viewers. Despite the strong opening, viewership lowered with each subsequent part with Part 2 reaching 12.9 million households, gaining 21.7 million viewers, and Part 3 reaching 3.5 million households, gaining 18.3 million viewers.

=== Critical reception ===
The documentary was met with generally positive reviews. Richard Buskin, author of The Complete Idiot's Guide to Beatles, commented that the retelling of the band's story was "extremely subjective" with the small lineup of only the four Beatles plus Martin, Aspinall and Taylor to voice their recollections. McCartney, Harrison and Starr "provided insights into their legend from the mature perspective of men in their fifties", according to Buskin, while "Lennon's [interviews] mostly originated from when he was in his twenties or thirties." When viewing the separate interviews, the three surviving Beatles did not always recall events the same way. Compromises had to be reached so that sensibilities were not offended, in particular with regard to events resulting in the 1970 breakup. Thus, Buskin stated, the result was not a definitive story of the Beatles' history, but rather a diplomatic celebration.

== Production credits ==
- Editor: Andy Matthews
- Production Manager: Bryony Cranstoun
- Line Producer: Stan Storc
- Archive Consultants: Julian Adamoli/Geraldine Royds
- Design/Art Direction: Richard Ward/The Team
- Cover Concept: Klaus Voormann
- Cover Painting: Klaus Voormann/Alfons Kiefer
- Picture Grading & Image Restoration: Ascent Media, London
- Picture Aspect: 4:3
- Sound: LPCM Stereo, Dolby Digital 5.1 surround sound, DTS 5.1 surround sound

== Episodes (expanded versions) ==
All songs are written by Lennon–McCartney and performed by the Beatles, unless otherwise noted.

=== One (July '40 to March '63) ===
"You couldn't get a cup of sugar, let alone a rock' n' roll record." – George Harrison

1. Liverpool: The Childhood Years [7:35]
  - "Help!" – title song played at the beginning of each episode
  - "In My Life" – edited clip of Beatles footage throughout the years
  - "In the Mood" (Manone, arr. Garland) — performed by the Glenn Miller Orchestra; played during a rapid-fire montage of photographs shown of each member
  - "We'll Meet Again" (Parker-Charles) — performed by Dame Vera Lynn
2. Discovering Rock & Roll [11:23]
3. John, Paul & George – The Beginning of The Beatles [5:21]
4. First Recordings 1958–1960 [2:55]
5. Stuart Sutcliffe [3:20]
6. Early Tours [6:59]
7. Pete Best [2:07]
8. Hamburg [13:16]
  - "Roll Over Beethoven" (Chuck Berry)
9. Growing Pains [1:09]
10. Stuart Sutcliffe Leaves [2:08]
  - Excerpts of the following songs:
    - "I'm Down"
    - "F.B.I." (Marvin-Welch-Harris) — performed by The Shadows
11. The Cavern [4:08]
  - Excerpts of the following songs:
    - "Long Tall Sally" (Johnson-Blackwell-Penniman)
    - "Kansas City" (Leiber-Stoller)
12. Decca Sessions [1:28]
  - Audition tapes recorded at the Decca Studios, London on 1 January 1962
    - "Three Cool Cats" (Leiber-Stoller) — George Harrison on lead vocal and Best on drums
    - "The Sheik of Araby" (Smith-Wheeler-Snyder) — Harrison on lead vocal and Best on drums
  - Audition tape recorded at Decca Studios on 1 January 1962, sequel to Get Back Sessions Footage
    - "Bésame Mucho" (Velazquez-Skylar) — Paul McCartney on lead vocal and Best on drums
13. "George Martin" [1:40]
  - The Beatles and George Martin discuss the context of their first meeting and recording contract.
14. Ringo Arrives [4:44]
  - "Some Other Guy" (Leiber-Stoller-Barrett) — video of the whole song played by the Beatles (with Ringo) in the Cavern
15. "Love Me Do" [3:13]
  - Overdubbed footage of the Beatles performing "Love Me Do" in 1963, which merges at the very end into brief footage of Ringo playing drums in 1995 during the Anthology sessions
16. "Please Please Me" – "We're No. 1" [7:27]
  - "How Do You Do It?" (Mitch Murray)
    - Audio of performance by Murray
    - Video of performance by Gerry and the Pacemakers
    - Audio of performance by the Beatles recorded at Abbey Road Studios on 4 September 1962
  - "Please Please Me" – performed live in 1964 on The Ed Sullivan Show
  - "Leave My Kitten Alone" (John-Turner-McDougal) — demo recording made on 14 August 1964 at Abbey Road Studios and played over the credits

=== Two (March '63 to February '64) ===
"George and I shared an apartment in Green Street, Park Lane... Wow! £45 a week. A fortune." – Ringo Starr

1. Racing Up the Ladder [11:02]
  - "Help!" – title song played at the beginning of each episode
  - "I'll Be on My Way" – radio out-take
  - "Lonesome Tears in My Eyes" (Burnette-Burnette-Burlinson-Jerome) – radio out-take
  - "That's All Right" (Crudup) – radio out-take
  - "So How Come" (Bryant/Bryant) – radio out-take
  - "Odeon Saturday Morning song" – performed by John Lennon
  - "Look Who It Is" (Schroeder-Hawker) – performed by Helen Shapiro
  - "Thank You Girl"
  - Sound collage of Please Please Me album: "I Saw Her Standing There" – "Misery" – "Anna (Go to Him)" (Alexander) – "Chains" (Goffin-King) – "Boys" (Dixon-Farrell) – "Ask Me Why" – "Please Please Me" – "Love Me Do" – "P.S. I Love You" – "Baby It's You" (David-Williams-Bacharach) – "Do You Want to Know a Secret" – "A Taste of Honey" (Scott-Marlow) – "There's a Place"
  - "Twist and Shout" (Medley-Russell)
2. Touring Britain – 1963 [11:30]
  - "Oh, Pretty Woman" (Orbison-Dees) – performed by Roy Orbison
  - "From Me to You"
  - "There's a Place"
  - "It Won't Be Long"
  - "She Loves You"
3. London – 1963 [4:01]
  - "I Wanna Be Your Man" (performed by the Rolling Stones)
  - "I Wanna Be Your Man"
4. Early Television Appearances [3:45]
  - Excerpts from the Big Night Out TV Show
  - Footage of live performance on Morecambe and Wise, recorded at Associated Television's Elstree TV studio's on Monday 2 December 1963, and broadcast on Saturday 18 April 1964 (8.25 pm)
    - "On Moonlight Bay" (Madden-Wenrich)
    - "I Like It" (Murray) – performed by Eric Morecambe
5. Voice clips from Abbey Road Studios [4:56]
  - Sound collage of studio outtakes: "One After 909" – "I Saw Her Standing There" – "This Boy" – "I Should Have Known Better" – "Tell Me Why" – "I Want to Hold Your Hand" – "I'll Be Back" – "Mr. Moonlight" (Johnson) – "No Reply" – "What You're Doing"
6. Reflections on Sudden Fame [5:13]
  - "This Boy"
7. Beatlemania [4:41]
  - Footage of a live performance on the Drop In TV show, Sweden, 3 November 1963
    - "I Saw Her Standing There"
    - "Long Tall Sally" (Johnson-Penniman-Blackwell)
8. Royal Variety Performance [9:43]
  - Excerpts from the Royal Command Performance at the Prince of Wales Theatre on 4 November 1963, broadcast on TV and radio on Sunday 10 November 1963
  - Includes Lennon's "jewelry" comment as an introduction to "Twist and Shout": "For our last number, I'd like to ask your help Would the people in the cheaper seats clap your hands, and the rest of you, if you'd just rattle your jewelry."
    - "From Me to You"
    - "Till There Was You" (Wilson)
    - "Twist and Shout" (Russell-Medley)
9. Second album: With the Beatles [9:39]
  - "All My Loving" – played in the background with Lennon saying: "We wanted to give people their money's worth with our records. Our policy was to put 14 tracks a side – it was brand new and never put singles on the albums. Everybody else who had a hit single made an album around it."
  - "Please Mr. Postman" (Dobbins-Garrett-Gorman-Holland-Bateman)
  - "Roll Over Beethoven" (Berry) – footage from Around The Beatles ITV special, 28 April 1964
  - "I Want to Hold Your Hand"
10. Olympia Theatre, Paris – 1964 [1:22]
  - Footage of the Beatles arriving at Le Bourget Airport, Paris, on 14 January 1964
11. "I Want to Hold Your Hand" Reaches No. 1 in the U.S. [5:50]
  - "I Want to Hold Your Hand" – played in the background of footage of the Beatles at London Heathrow Airport, leaving for New York City on 7 February 1964
  - "One After 909" – played over the credits

=== Three (February '64 to July '64) ===
"Miami! That was just like paradise because we'd never been anywhere with palm trees." – Paul McCartney

1. Arrival in the U.S. – February 1964 [10:00]
  - "Help!" – title song played at the beginning of each episode
  - Footage of the Beatles arriving at John F. Kennedy International Airport in Queens, New York, 7 February 1964; voice of Beatles Manager Brian Epstein is heard saying, "If there was a turning point in their career, a specific date on which the scope of their future was to be altered, then it was the day they touched down at Kennedy International New York to a welcome seldom equalled anywhere in history"
  - "Pride and Joy" (Whitfield-Gaye-Stevenson) – performed by Marvin Gaye
  - Excerpts of telephone conversation between BBC Radio's Brian Matthew and the group
2. First Appearance on The Ed Sullivan Show [3:55]
  - "All My Loving" – footage of the Beatles' first appearance on The Ed Sullivan Show, 9 February 1964
  - Paul McCartney remarking later: "It's still supposed to be the largest viewing audience ever in the States"
  - Footage of a congratulatory telegram from Elvis Presley and Colonel Tom Parker
  - Harrison commenting later: "they said there was the least reported, or no reported crime. Even the criminals had a rest for ten minutes while we were on"
3. The Coliseum Concert – Washington D.C. [10:29]
  - Footage of the Beatles performing at Washington Coliseum on 11 February 1964:
    - "She Loves You"
    - "I Saw Her Standing There"
    - "Please Please Me"
4. Reception at the British Embassy [1:08]
  - Footage of the Beatles' reception at the British Embassy in Washington D.C. on 11 February 1964
5. Miami Beach [3:00]
  - "I'll Follow the Sun" – played over a montage of still photographs of the group's visit to Miami Beach, Florida
6. Second Appearance on The Ed Sullivan Show [3:54]
  - Footage from rehearsals for The Ed Sullivan Show, Miami, 16 February 1964
  - "This Boy" – excerpts from the Beatles' second appearance on The Ed Sullivan Show
  - "These youngsters from Liverpool, England. Their conduct over here, not only as fine professional singers but as a group of fine youngsters will leave an imprint with everyone over here who has met them." — Ed Sullivan
7. Return to England [1:59]
  - "I Want to Hold Your Hand" – footage of the Fab Four returning to England and meeting the press at the London Airport on 22 February 1964
8. "They're Going to Put Us in the Movies" [2:56]
  - McCartney: "I'm talking about this progression with the Beatles. From the Stevedores' and Dockers' Union, the Cavern, better clubs. So films was one that we'd always thought of... We were interested in films and what happened was Brian started talking to people, knowing of our interest and he came up with Dick Lester's name."
  - Footage from the classic comedy short film Running Jumping Standing Still, directed by Richard Lester
  - McCartney: "Dick came round. He was a bit of a musician, played jazz piano, so he was even more interestin... He got hold of Alun Owen, a Welsh playwright who'd written Last Tram to Lime Street... He picked up little quotes like 'He's very clean, isn't he?' He picked up the jokes and sarcasm, the Beatle humour, John's wit and each one of us, Ringo's laconic humour. He picked up our characters, which was good."
9. Filming A Hard Day's Night [10:54]
  - Footage from the film A Hard Day's Night, including the following songs:
    - "A Hard Day's Night"
    - "I Should Have Known Better"
    - "If I Fell"
    - "Can't Buy Me Love" – the film version merged with the NME Poll Winners' Concert version
10. In His Own Write [3:00]
  - Footage from the television program Not Only... But Also, where Lennon reads The Wrestling Dog from his book In His Own Write
  - Photographs of The Daily Howl, a daily comic drawn by John Lennon in his school days
11. World Tour 1964 [14:45]
  - Footage of an interview with Derek Taylor, the Beatles' press liaison, regarding his visit to Torquay accompanying Brian Epstein while he was writing A Cellarful of Noise
  - Footage of a discussion of Starr's temporary replacement by Jimmie Nicol due to Ringo's tonsillitis during the World Tour of 1964
    - "Long Tall Sally" (Johnson-Blackwell-Penniman) – footage of the group performing in the Netherlands on 5 June 1964
    - "I'll Be Back" – played over footage of the group's visit to the Netherlands and their arrival in Hong Kong on 8 June 1964
    - "Any Time at All" – played over footage of the group's arrival in Sydney on 11 June 1964
  - Footage of the Beatles' performance at the Festival Hall in Melbourne, Australia on 17 June 1964
    - "All My Loving"
    - "You Can't Do That"
12. World Premiere of A Hard Day's Night [2:14]
  - "A Hard Day's Night" – played over footage of the world premiere of the film A Hard Day's Night in London on 6 July 1964
13. Liverpool Homecoming [5:42]
  - "Things We Said Today" – played over footage of the Beatles' homecoming to Liverpool on 10 July 1964
  - "I'll Be Back" (Demo version) – played over the credits

=== Four (August '64 to August '65) ===
"She (The Queen) seemed pleasant enough, you know; made us relax." – John Lennon

1. First Major U.S. Tour – Summer, 1964 [9:12]
  - "Help!" – title song played at the beginning of each episode
  - "Rock and Roll Music" (Berry)
  - Footage of the Beatles performing at The Hollywood Bowl on 23 August 1964 —
    - "All My Loving"
    - "She Loves You"
2. Meeting Bob Dylan [3:01]
  - Footage of discussions on Bob Dylan and his music:
    - McCartney: "He was our idol."
    - Ringo Starr: "Bob was our hero... I heard of Bob through John. He played the records to me. It was just great."
    - Harrison: "Not an idol but we heard his record; we'd listen to his album. It really gave us a buzz and we played it over and over again... I think it was Freewheelin'."
    - McCartney: "We loved Bob Dylan."
  - Footage of live performance of Dylan —
    - "The Times They Are a-Changin'" (Dylan)
    - "A Hard Rain's a-Gonna Fall" (Dylan)
3. The Pressures of Touring [6:13]
  - "That Means a Lot" – played in the background during discussion of the group's busy schedule and lack of days off
  - "Slow Down" (Williams) – played in the background of footage of the Beatles returning from the US, photographed at London Airport on 21 September 1964, where they played 32 shows in 34 days in 24 different cities
4. Feedback – "I Feel Fine" [3:50]
  - "I Feel Fine" – the group discussing the use of sound effects like feedback in their music:
    - George Martin: "John had mucked around with feedbacks for a while. Yes, it was intentional... I think it was the first time that feedback was used on a record... It was his idea, it was great."
    - Harrison: "He figured out how to do it. We used to do it on stage then... In a way, he invented Jimi Hendrix."
    - McCartney: "It probably was, actually."
5. Recording "Beatles for Sale" [8:49]
  - "Kansas City"/"Hey, Hey, Hey, Hey" (Leiber-Stoller/Penniman) – footage from the Shindig! TV show, London
  - "I'm a Loser" – footage from live performance at the Palais des Sports, Paris
  - "Everybody's Trying to Be My Baby" (Perkins) – footage from live performance at the Palais des Sports
6. Filming Help! [14:27]
  - Footage from the film Help! showing glimpses of various episodes, and playing the following songs:
    - "Another Girl"
    - "The Night Before"
    - "You're Going to Lose That Girl"
    - "You've Got to Hide Your Love Away"
    - "Help!" (Live on the Big Night Out TV show, Blackpool)
7. "Yesterday" [5:09]
  - Footage from the Big Night Out TV show, Blackpool – the Beatles' only British television appearance to promote Help!... and the first solo stage performance of "Yesterday;" recorded and broadcast on Sunday, 1 August 1965 from the ABC Theatre, Blackpool from 9:10 to 10:05 pm
    - "Yesterday"
    - "I'm Down"
8. NME Poll Winners' Concert – 11 April 1965 [2:00]
  - "I Feel Fine"
  - "She's a Woman"
9. George talks about his songs [4:07]
  - Harrsion: "They'd been writing since we were at school. They'd written all – or most of their bad songs before we got into the recording studio. I had to come from nowhere and start writing and to have something at least quality enough to put in the record with all their wondrous hits."
  - "Act Naturally" (Russell-Morrison) (Live on the Big Night Out TV show, Blackpool) — "Now something we don't often do. Give someone a chance to sing who doesn't often sing... here he is. All out of key and nervous, singing 'Act Naturally'." — Intro by Ringo
10. "Ticket to Ride" [2:44]
  - "Ticket to Ride" – footage of two versions of the song, the live version at Blackpool and the taped TV promotional film version, are merged
11. The Beatles Receive the MBE From the Queen [11:01]
  - "Eight Days a Week" – played behind the footage of people storming gates of the Buckingham Palace, London on the day the Beatles received MBEs from the Queen
  - "If You've Got Trouble" (Take 1) – played while showing the credits

=== Five (August '65 to July '66) ===
"We were all expanding in all areas in our life; opening up to a lot of different attitudes." – Ringo Starr

1. Shea Stadium Concert – 15 August 1965 [15:37]
  - "Help!" – title song played at the beginning of each episode
  - Ed Sullivan welcomes the Beatles to the concert at Shea Stadium in Queens, New York, 15 August 1965 – "Ladies and gentlemen, Honoured by their country, decorated by their Queen and loved here in America... Here are the Beatles!"
    - "Twist and Shout" (Russel-Medley) [Live]
    - "I Feel Fine" [Live]
    - "Baby's in Black" [Live]
    - "I'm Down" [Live]
    - "Help!" [Live]
2. Meeting Elvis Presley [5:04]
  - "Mohair Sam" (Frazier) – performed by Charlie Rich
  - "Hound Dog" (Leiber-Stoller) – last notes of the song, performed by Elvis Presley
3. More Tour Pressure [2:31]
  - "Run for Your Life"
4. New Musical Directions – Rubber Soul and Revolver [8:20]
  - "In My Life" (Overdub on 22 October 1965 – Take 3) – played in the background over footage showing the band talking about new musical directions
    - George Martin: "They were finding new frontiers all the time."
    - Starr: "Our whole attitude was changing... I think grass was really influential in a lot of our changes."
    - McCartney "The direction was changing away from poppy stuff... We branched out into songs that are a bit more surreal, more entertaining... Dylan was starting to influence us quite heavily at that point."
    - Lennon: "When it got sort of contemporary as it were, a contemporary influence... I think Rubber Soul was about when it started happening."
  - "Drive My Car" (recorded on 13 October 1965 – Take 4) – "Nowhere Man" (remake recorded on 22 October 1965 – Take 4] – a musical collage played over footage of still photographs showing moments of the band in studio during recording of Rubber Soul
  - Rāga Charu Kishi – footage showing snippets of a Sitar Recital of the Rāga by Ravi Shankar; Harrision discussing the using sitar in "Norwegian Wood"
  - "Norwegian Wood (This Bird Has Flown)" (12 October 1965 – Take 1) – played over footage of still photographs showing moments of the band recording the song
  - "Nowhere Man" (remake recorded on 22 October 1965 – Take 4) – played in the background over McCartney discussing the stretched photo on the cover of the album Rubber Soul; the photo being the result of backward falling of the album-sized piece of cardboard on which photographer Robert Freeman was projecting photos at Lennon's house
5. "Yellow Submarine" [3:40]
  - "Yellow Submarine" (recorded 26 May 1966 – Take 5) – footage from the film Yellow Submarine edited with Beatles footage (live-action and animation combination)
  - "Taxman" (Harrison) [Overdub on 22 April 1966 – Take 12] – played over footage of still photographs showing moments of the band recording the song; and Harrison references the context of the song – "...In those days we paid 19s.6d. out of every £1... That was with super-tax, surtax and tax-tax and stuff."
6. "Tomorrow Never Knows" [1:27]
  - "Tomorrow Never Knows" — "That's me in my Tibetan Book of the Dead period..." – Lennon
7. Technical Limitations in the Studio [2:56]
  - "Nowhere Man" – footage of the Beatles' live performance of the song at Circus Krone, Munich – 24 June 1966
8. LSD (3:15)
  - "Doctor Robert" (recorded 17 April 1966 – Take 7)
  - "We were just insane. We all thought there was a fire in the lift. Just a little red light and we were all screaming, all hysterical." – Lennon
9. "Day Tripper" [3:15]
  - "Day Tripper" (recorded on 16 October 1965 – Take 3) – taped TV promotional film of the song. — "Day Tripper – that was a drug song, I just liked the word" – Lennon
10. "We Can Work It Out" [2:47]
  - "We Can Work It Out" (overdub on 29 October 1965 – Take 2) – taped TV promotional film of the song
11. Taped TV Promotional Films [1:34]
  - "I'm Looking Through You" played in the background — "Going to the TV studios to promote our records was too much of a hassle. We'll just make our own little films and we'll put them out." – Harrison
12. "Paperback Writer" [2:55]
  - "Paperback Writer" (overdub on 14 April 1966 onto recording of 13 April 1966 – Take 2) – footage of promotional film of the song
    - "we can't go everywhere. We'll send these things out to promote the record. These days, everybody does that. It's just part of your promotion for a single, so I suppose in a way we invented MTV." – Harrison
13. "Rain" [3:02]
  - "Rain" (overdub on 16 April 1966 onto recording of 14 April 1966 – Take 7) – footage of promotional film of the song — "That's the first record with backwards music on it." – Lennon
14. World Tour 1966 [15:24]
  - "Got to Get You into My Life" – played over footage showing the Beatles arriving at Haneda Airport, Tokyo on 30 June 1966
  - Footage of the Beatles' live performance at Nippon Budokan Hall, Tokyo on 30 June 1966:
    - "Rock and Roll Music" (Berry)
    - "Paperback Writer"
    - "Yesterday"
  - "The Word" – played over footage of still photographs and video recordings of "trouble in the Philippines"
  - "And Your Bird Can Sing" (Take 2) – played while showing the credits

=== Six (July '66 to June '67) ===
"I should have said television is more popular than Jesus; then I might have got away with it." – John Lennon

1. Trouble in the Philippines [8:35]
  - "Help!" – title song played at the beginning of each episode
  - "The Word"
2. "Eleanor Rigby" [9:25]
  - "Eleanor Rigby" – solo performance of Paul McCartney amalgamating into the performance by the Beatles, ending with the solo performance.
  - Footage of a Brian Epstein press conference at New York City on 6 August 1966 regarding an early 1966 interview which Lennon gave to the Evening Standard
  - Footage from the Beatles' press conference at Chicago on 11 August 1966 where Lennon speaks about the "More popular than Jesus" controversy
  - "I'm Only Sleeping"
3. Touring Takes Its Toll [2:35]
4. The Last Concert – San Francisco, 29 August 1966 [4:52]
  - "For No One" – played over footage from the Beatles' concerts over the years
5. Individual Directions [5:44]
  - Footage from the movie How I Won the War directed by Richard Lester showing Lennon acting
  - Footage showing Starr hanging around with Lennon in Spain during the shooting of How I Won the War
  - Footage of a six-week visit of India by Harrison
  - Footage from the film The Family Way where Paul McCartney wrote the film score teaming up with George Martin which eventually won the Ivor Novello Award for the Best Film Song for Love in the Open Air
    - Music from The Family Way (McCartney) – performed by The Tudor Minstrels
    - "Love in the Open Air" (McCartney-Martin) – performed by The Tudor Minstrels
6. The Making of "Strawberry Fields Forever" [5:50]
  - "Strawberry Fields Forever"
7. "Penny Lane" [5:17]
  - "Penny Lane"
  - "Release Me" (Miller-Williams-Yount) – performed by Engelbert Humperdinck – playing very softly in the background while listening to a recording of a Beatles' radio interview about not reaching No. 1
8. Sgt. Pepper's Lonely Hearts Club Band [5:35]
  - "Sgt. Pepper's Lonely Hearts Club Band
  - "With a Little Help from My Friends"
  - "Being for the Benefit of Mr. Kite!"
9. "A Day in the Life" [10:08]
  - "A Day in the Life"
  - "Sgt. Pepper's Lonely Hearts Club Band"
10. Reaction to Sgt. Pepper's Lonely Hearts Club Band [3:07]
  - "Sgt. Pepper's Lonely Hearts Club Band" – footage showing live performance by Jimi Hendrix at the Isle of Wight Festival on 31 August 1970
11. Drugs Reflect The Times [4:38]
12. "Baby You're A Rich Man" [5:03]
  - "Baby, You're a Rich Man"
  - "Strawberry Fields Forever" (Take 1) – played while showing the credits

=== Seven (June '67 to July '68) ===
"We got backstage to see Maharishi and I said to him: 'Got any mantras?'" – George Harrison

1. Satellite Broadcast of "All You Need is Love" [10:10]
  - "Help!" – title song played at the beginning of each episode
  - "All You Need Is Love" – Our World Global Satellite Broadcast on 25 June 1967
  - "Eight Miles High" – performed by The Byrds – played in the background of Harrison talking about the Summer of Love
2. Meeting the Maharishi [4:17]
3. Brian Epstein's death [8:16]
  - "You've Got to Hide Your Love Away" – 18 February 1965 (Take 5) – Epstein died on 27 August 1967
4. "Magical Mystery Tour" [10:05]
  - "Magical Mystery Tour" – footage from the film Magical Mystery Tour
  - "You Made Me Love You (I Didn't Want to Do It)" (McCarthy-Monaco) performed by Jessie Robbins and the Magical Mystery Tour Passengers; footage from the film Magical Mystery Tour
  - "The Fool on the Hill" – footage from the film Magical Mystery Tour
  - "Your Mother Should Know" has footage from the film Magical Mystery Tour. The scene, known as the 'staircase' scene, was filmed in the disused aircraft hangars at RAF West Malling in Kent, in September 1967.
  - "Flying" (instrumental) (Lennon–McCartney–Harrison–Starkey) has footage from the film Magical Mystery Tour. In the sequence, the music is accompanied in the film by colour-altered images of landscape in Iceland, taken from an airplane. The shots were provided from outtakes of Stanley Kubrick's famous comedy Dr. Strangelove.
5. "I Am The Walrus" [5:11]
  - "I Am the Walrus" has footage from the film Magical Mystery Tour. The scene was filmed on the disused airfield runways at RAF West Malling in Kent, in September 1967. The soundtrack was changed from the original VHS edition of Anthology to a DVD: a new all-true-stereo mix of the song was introduced, for the first time eliminating the use of "fake stereo" after the second verse of the song.
6. "Hello, Goodbye" [3:45]
  - "Hello, Goodbye" – a promotional film for The Ed Sullivan Show
7. The Apple Boutique [2:20]
8. Rishikesh, India [8:42]
  - "Across the Universe" – 3 February 1968 (Take 2)
  - "Dear Prudence"
  - "I Will" – 16 September 1968 (Take 1)
  - "Dera Dhun" (Harrison) – performed by Harrison
  - "Everybody's Got Something to Hide Except Me and My Monkey"
9. Apple Records [7:58]
  - Footage of Apple press conference, New York City, 14 May 1968
  - "Sour Milk Sea" (Harrison) performed by: Jackie Lomax
  - "Something in the Way She Moves" (Taylor) performed by: James Taylor
  - "Maybe Tomorrow" (Evans) performed by: The Iveys
  - "No Matter What" (Ham) performed by: Badfinger
  - "Goodbye" (Lennon–McCartney) performed by: Mary Hopkin
10. "Lady Madonna" [2:26]
  - "Lady Madonna" – 3 and 6 February 1968
11. "Yellow Submarine" [4:05]
  - "Yellow Submarine" – footage from the film Yellow Submarine
  - "All Together Now" – footage from the film Yellow Submarine
12. John Meets Yoko Ono [6:23]
  - "Happiness Is a Warm Gun" – May 1968 (Esher demo)
  - "Unfinished Music No.1: Two Virgins" (Lennon-Ono) performed by: John Lennon & Yoko Ono
  - "While My Guitar Gently Weeps" (Harrison) – Demo acoustic version (25 July 1968) — played while showing the credits

=== Eight (July '68 to The End) ===
"I'm really glad that most of our songs were about love, peace and understanding." – Paul McCartney

1. The "White" Album [9:23]
  - "Help!" – title song played at the beginning of each episode
  - "Yer Blues" – "Blackbird" – "What's The New Mary Jane" – "Ob-La-Di, Ob-La-Da" – "Good Night" – "Rocky Raccoon" – "Sexy Sadie" – "While My Guitar Gently Weeps" (Harrison) – "Mother Nature's Son" – "Piggies" (Harrison) – "I Will" – "Julia" – "Why Don't We Do It in the Road?" – "I'm So Tired" – "Don't Pass Me By" (Starkey) – a musical collage taking excerpts from live studio recording during The White Album sessions
2. "Revolution" [3:21]
  - "Revolution"
3. The Apple Boutique Closes [1:52]
4. "Hey Jude" [8:27]
  - Footage of the Beatles performing live on 8 September 1968 at the Frost on Sunday television show
  - David Frost Theme (Martin)
  - "Hey Jude"
5. Recording at Twickenham Studios [9:52]
  - "I've Got a Feeling" – jamming at Twickenham Film Studios
  - "For You Blue" (Harrison) – Apple Recording Studio, Savile Row, London
6. Billy Preston Sits In [2:59]
  - "Get Back"
7. "The Long and the Winding Road" [3:49]
  - "The Long and Winding Road"
8. The Rooftop Concert 30 January 1969 [10:03]
  - "Don't Let Me Down" performed at the Rooftop Concert
  - "Get Back" performed at the Rooftop Concert
  - "Wedding Bells Are Breaking Up (That Old Gang of Mine)" (Fain-Kahal-Raskin) – performed by Paul McCartney during the recording of the Anthology Series
9. "Let It Be" [4:08]
  - Let It Be – 'An Intimate Bioscopic Experience with The Beatles'
10. Paul Marries Linda, John Marries Yoko [2:57]
  - Paul marries Linda on 12 March 1969
  - John marries Yoko on 20 March 1969
11. "The Ballad of John And Yoko" [2:55]
  - "The Ballad of John and Yoko"
12. Comments on the Break-Up of the Band [5:28]
13. Abbey Road [8:56]
  - "Something" (Harrison)
  - "Golden Slumbers" – "Octopus's Garden" (Starkey) – "Here Comes the Sun" (Harrison) – "Come Together" – a musical collage taking excerpts from live studio recording during the Abbey Road sessions
  - "Because" – "The End" – showing footage of the last photo sessions on 22 August 1969
14. "Free as a Bird" [7:49]
  - "Free as a Bird" (Lennon/Lennon–McCartney–Harrison–Starkey) – the video
  - Credits: a musical montage consisting of studio outtakes of – "I Saw Her Standing There" – "Got to Get You into My Life" – "Misery" – "Sie Liebt Dich" – "And I Love Her" – "Being for the Benefit of Mr. Kite!" – "Rocky Raccoon" – "All You Need Is Love" – played over the credits

=== Nine ('94 to '95) ===
A bonus episode featuring unseen footage of the three remaining members working on the Anthology project and reflecting on their time as the Beatles. It was released on Disney+ on 29 November 2025 with the Anthology Collection.

=== DVD Special Features ===
1. Recollections – June 1994 [16:51] – McCartney, Harrison, and Starr spend a happy summer's day together in Harrison's house; singing, playing, and warmly remembering early days of room sharing, haircuts, Beatle boots, first cars and meeting Elvis.
  - "Baby What You Want Me to Do" (Reed)
  - "Raunchy" (Justis-Manker)
  - "Thinking of Linking" (McCartney)
  - "Blue Moon of Kentucky" (Monroe)
  - "Ain't She Sweet" (Yellen-Ager)
2. Compiling The Anthology Albums [10:48] – McCartney, Harrison, Starr and George Martin detail the process of choosing the tracks for Anthology Albums 1, 2 and 3.
  - "A Day in the Life" (Take 1)
3. Back at Abbey Road – May 1995 [14:51] – returning to Studio 2; McCartney, Harrison, Starr, and Martin reflect on recording at Abbey Road Studios in the Sixties and some of the techniques used in creating the recordings
  - "Golden Slumbers" (Take 1)
  - "I'm Only Sleeping"
  - "Tomorrow Never Knows" (Take 1 & Final Take)
4. Recording "Free as a Bird" And "Real Love" [10:57] – McCartney, Harrison, Starr, and Jeff Lynne reveal how they were able to produce two new Beatles tracks from Lennon's original demos provided by Ono. The section includes intimate footage filmed in the studio during the recording of the tracks.
  - "Free as a Bird" (Lennon/Lennon–McCartney–Harrison–Starkey)
  - "Real Love" (Lennon)
5. Production Team [13:03] – Neil Aspinall, Derek Taylor, Geoff Wonfor, Chips Chipperfield and other key members of the Anthology production Team explain the process of how The Beatles Anthology series was created.
6. Making The "Free as a Bird" Video [11:12] has insight into how the video for Free as a Bird was made. Director Joe Pytka explains how he and Apple developed the concept and discusses the techniques that were used in the production.
  - "Free as a Bird" (Lennon/Lennon–McCartney-Harrison-Starkey)
7. "Real Love" Video [4:07] – the video that was not featured in the Anthology series, now remixed in 5.1 Surround Sound
  - "Real Love" (Lennon)
8. Credits (0:57)

== Certifications ==
Region	Certification	Certified units/sales
Australia (ARIA)	Platinum	15,000^{^}
^{^} Shipments figures based on certification alone.
