= The Beatles Anthology (book) =

2000 book by the Beatles

- 2002 paperback cover
- Author: The Beatles
- Cover artist: Klaus Voormann
- Language: English
- Subject: Musical autobiography
- Genre: Autobiography
- Publisher: Cassell, London
- Publication date: October 2000
- Media type: Hardback; later paperback
- Pages: 367
- ISBN: 978-0304356058

The Beatles Anthology is a book published in October 2000 as part of The Beatles Anthology film project. It includes interviews with all four band members, John Lennon, Paul McCartney, George Harrison and Ringo Starr, together with others involved, most notably producer George Martin, press officer Derek Taylor (who died three years before this book was published) and roadie and head of Apple Corps, Neil Aspinall, who oversaw the project.

The book, which is billed as the only autobiography of the Beatles, also features more than 1,200 rare photos and colour illustrations. Many of the interviews quoted are from those featured in the documentary films, and additional interviews were conducted specifically for the book. John Lennon's passages were accumulated from various archives and sources, including his December 1970 Rolling Stone interview, his September 1980 interview with Playboy and quotes from the 1968 biography of the band by Hunter Davies. The book went straight to the top of the New York Times bestsellers list. In 2002, the book was released as a large-format paperback.

The book was compiled, edited and prepared for press by Genesis Publications, and it was awarded the BCA Illustrated Book of the Year at the British Book Awards in London on 22 February 2001. The awards, popularly known as the 'Nibbies', have been running since 1990 and express the book trade's own preferences of books published in the past year.

The book was reissued for its 25th anniversary, on 14 October 2025, in the U.S., and on 20 November in the U.K.

== See also ==
- The Beatles Anthology, TV series
