= Real Love (Beatles song) =

1979 song by John Lennon, later released by the Beatles

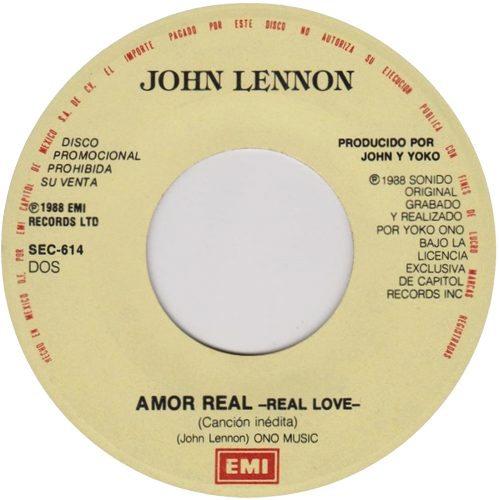

Song by John Lennon

from the album Imagine: John Lennon
- Released: 10 October 1988
- Recorded: October 1979, New York City
- Length: 2:48
- Label: Parlophone; EMI
- Songwriter: John Lennon
- Producers: John Lennon; Yoko Ono

"Real Love"

Single by the Beatles

from the album Anthology 2
- B-side: "Baby's in Black" (Live)
- Released: 4 March 1996
- Recorded: July 1980, Bermuda; February 1995, Hogg Hill Mill, Sussex, England
- Genre: Rock
- Length: 3:54 (1996 mix); 3:34 (2025 mix)
- Label: Apple
- Songwriter: John Lennon
- Producers: George Harrison, John Lennon, Paul McCartney, Ringo Starr, Jeff Lynne

The Beatles singles chronology
| "Free as a Bird" (1995) | "Real Love" (1996) | "Now and Then" / "Love Me Do" (2023) |

Audio sample
- file; help

Music video
- "Real Love" on YouTube

"Real Love" is a song written by the English musician John Lennon. He recorded six demos of the song in 1979 and 1980 with "Real Life", a different song that merged with "Real Love". In 1988, the sixth take was posthumously released for the documentary soundtrack Imagine: John Lennon. In 1995, the fifth take was completed by his former Beatles bandmates Paul McCartney, George Harrison and Ringo Starr as part of The Beatles Anthology project, along with "Free as a Bird".

The song was released as a Beatles single in 1996 in the United Kingdom, United States and many other countries. It respectively reached number 4 and number 11 in the UK and US singles charts, and earned a gold record more quickly than a number of the group's other singles. The song was not included on the BBC Radio 1 playlist, prompting criticism from fans and British Members of Parliament. The track opened the Beatles' Anthology 2 album. "Real Love" was the last new Beatles song released in the lifetime of George Harrison, who died in 2001, and the last single by the group until "Now and Then" in 2023.

== Early origins ==
According to Beatles biographer John T. Marck, "Real Love" originated as part of an unfinished stage play that Lennon was working on at the time, titled The Ballad of John and Yoko. The song was first recorded in 1977 with a handheld tape recorder on his piano at home. Eventually the work evolved under the title "Real Life", a song which Lennon would record at least six times in 1979 and 1980, and was then abandoned. The song was eventually combined with elements of another Lennon demo, "Baby Make Love to You". In June 1978, Lennon and his wife Yoko Ono told the press that they were working on a musical, The Ballad of John and Yoko, which had been planned during the previous year. Songs proposed to be included up to this point were "Real Love" and "Every Man Has a Woman Who Loves Him".

In later versions, Lennon altered portions of the song; for example, "no need to be alone / it's real love / yes, it's real love" became "why must it be alone / it's real / well it's real life". Some takes included an acoustic guitar, while the eventual Beatles release features Lennon on piano, with rudimentary double-tracked vocals, and a tambourine. The version released in 1996 most closely reflected the lyrical structure of the early demo takes of the song.

Lennon appears to have considered recording "Real Love" for his and Ono's 1980 album Double Fantasy. A handwritten draft of the album's running order places it as the possible opening track on side two. The song remained largely forgotten until 1988, when take 6 of "Real Love" appeared on the Imagine: John Lennon soundtrack album. The song was also released on the Acoustic album in 2004. The demo with just Lennon on piano was issued in 1998 on John Lennon Anthology and then later on Working Class Hero: The Definitive Lennon.

== Posthumous recording with the other Beatles ==
Before the Anthology project, the four living ex-Beatles had reunited on record only once - albeit not all four together on a particular song - for Starr's Ringo album in 1973, when Lennon, Harrison and Starr collaborated on Lennon's "I'm The Greatest". The album also included the Paul and Linda McCartney-composed "Six O'Clock" which featured McCartney and Starr.

By the early 1990s, the idea of finishing some of Lennon's old songs was inspired by former Beatles road manager Neil Aspinall and Harrison, who first requested some demos from Ono. In January 1994, McCartney went to New York City for Lennon's induction into the Rock and Roll Hall of Fame. While there, he received at least four songs from Ono. According to Aspinall, it was "two cassettes" which "might have been five or six tracks". Ono said of the occasion: "It was all settled before then, I just used that occasion to hand over the tapes personally to Paul. I did not break up the Beatles, but I was there at the time, you know? Now I'm in a position where I could bring them back together and I would not want to hinder that."

In an interview, McCartney remarked:

Yoko said "I've got a couple of tracks I'll play you, you might be interested". I'd never heard them before but she explained that they're quite well known to Lennon fans as bootlegs. I said to Yoko, "Don't impose too many conditions on us, it's really difficult to do this, spiritually. We don't know, we may hate each other after two hours in the studio and just walk out. So don't put any conditions, it's tough enough. If it doesn't work out, you can veto it." When I told George and Ringo I'd agreed to that, they were going, "What? What if we love it?" It didn't come to that, luckily.

McCartney, Harrison and Starr then focused their attention on four songs: "Free as a Bird", "Real Love", "Grow Old with Me" and "Now and Then". Of these, they liked "Free as a Bird" the most, and worked hard on it. Eventually the song was released as the first new Beatles single since 1970. The remaining Beatles then turned their attention to "Real Love", which, co-producer Jeff Lynne later remarked, at least "had a complete set of words". "Now and Then" would later be released in 2023. The demo used by the Beatles is believed to have been recorded by Lennon in Bermuda in July 1980.

== Working in the studio ==
With George Martin declining to produce the new recording, the Beatles brought in Electric Light Orchestra's Jeff Lynne, who had worked extensively with Harrison, including as part of the Traveling Wilburys, and had already co-produced "Free as a Bird". The first problem that the team had to confront was the low quality of the demo, as Lennon had recorded it on a handheld tape recorder. Lynne recalled:

We tried out a new noise reduction system, and it really worked. The problem I had with "Real Love" was that not only was there a 60 cycles mains hum going on, there was also a terrible amount of hiss, because it had been recorded at a low level. I don't know how many generations down this copy was, but it sounded like at least a couple. So I had to get rid of the hiss and the mains hum, and then there were clicks all the way through it ... We'd spend a day on it, then listen back and still find loads more things wrong ... It didn't have any effect on John's voice, because we were just dealing with the air surrounding him, in between phrases. That took about a week to clean up before it was even usable and transferable to a DAT master. Putting fresh music to it was the easy part!

Although "Real Love" was more complete than "Free as a Bird", which had required the addition of some lyrics by McCartney, the song also suffered from problems with Lennon's timing. Lynne recalled that "it took a lot of work to get it all in time so that the others could play to it". Lynne emphasised that the three remaining Beatles were keen to ensure the song sounded very "Beatles-y": "What we were trying to do was create a record that was timeless, so we steered away from using state-of the-art gear. We didn't want to make it fashionable."

As with "Free as a Bird", the Beatles worked at McCartney's studio in Sussex, with the intention of producing another single. Added to the demo were the sounds of a double bass (originally owned by Elvis Presley's bassist, Bill Black), Fender Jazz bass guitar, a couple of Fender Stratocaster guitars, one of which was Harrison's psychedelically-painted "Rocky" Strat (as seen in the "I Am the Walrus" video), as well as a Ludwig drum kit. Other than their regular instruments, a Baldwin Combo Harpsichord (as played by George Martin on the Beatles song "Because") and a harmonium (which appeared on the band's 1965 hit single "We Can Work It Out") were also used. During the recording process, it was decided to speed up the tape, thereby raising the key from D minor to E♭ minor.

As their sound engineer, the Beatles opted for Geoff Emerick, who had not only worked with them to a great extent in the 1960s, but is often credited with many of the Beatles' audio inventions. The assistant engineer was Jon Jacobs, who had worked with McCartney and Emerick since the late 1970s. The attitude in the studio was very relaxed, according to Lynne: "Paul and George would strike up the backing vocals – and all of a sudden it's the Beatles again! ... I'd be waiting to record and normally I'd say, 'OK, Let's do a take', but I was too busy laughing and smiling at everything they were talking about." Starr said that the lightheartedness was key to ensuring he, Harrison and McCartney could focus on the task: "We just pretended that John had gone on holiday or out for tea and had left us the tape to play with. That was the only way we could deal with it, and get over the hurdle, because [it] was really very emotional."

Starr commented: "Recording the new songs didn't feel contrived at all. It felt very natural and it was a lot of fun, but emotional too, at times. But it's the end of the line, really. There's nothing more we can do as the Beatles."

== Music video ==
The single's video features shots of the three remaining Beatles recording in Sussex, mixed with shots of the Beatles taken during their career, including a brief clip of Ringo Starr drumming from Paul McCartney's solo film Give My Regards to Broad Street. Geoff Wonfor, who directed the Anthology documentary, filmed the three recording in the studio with a handheld camcorder, as they did not want to be aware of the camera recording. Kevin Godley, who co-directed the music video, said that it was meant to be a "fly on the wall thing".

== Release ==
Although "Real Love" was released as single in both the UK and US on 4 March 1996, the first time the song was publicly aired was on 22 November 1995, when the American television network, the American Broadcasting Company (ABC) aired the second episode of The Beatles Anthology. The single debuted on the British charts on 16 March 1996 at number 4, selling 50,000 copies in its first week.

"Real Love" fell out of the British charts in seven weeks, never topping its initial position of number 4. In the US, the single entered the charts on 30 March, and peaked at number 11. After four months, 500,000 copies had been sold in the US. The Beatles' compilation album Anthology 2, which included the song, eventually topped the British and American albums charts.

John Lennon's solo versions appear on several Lennon compilations, the film Imagine: John Lennon, and also in a 2007 ad campaign for J. C. Penney.

=== BBC Radio 1 playlist controversy ===
When released, "Real Love" was not on BBC Radio 1's weekly singles playlist. Reuters reported that the station had said: "It's not what our listeners want to hear. ... We are a contemporary music station."

Beatles spokesman Geoff Baker responded by saying that the band's response was "Indignation. Shock and surprise. We carried out research after the Anthology was launched and this revealed that 41% of the buyers were teenagers." The exclusion elicited comment from Conservative MP Harry Greenway, who called the action censorship.

McCartney wrote an 800-word article for British newspaper The Daily Mirror about the alleged ban, in which he stated: "the Beatles don't need our new single, 'Real Love', to be a hit. It's not as if our careers depend on it. ... It's very heartening to know that, while the kindergarten kings of Radio 1 may think the Beatles are too old to come out to play, a lot of younger British bands don't seem to share that view. I'm forever reading how bands like Oasis are openly crediting the Beatles as inspiration, and I'm pleased that I can hear the Beatles in a lot of the music around today." The letter was published on 9 March, the day after Radio 1 announced their playlist.

The station's controller, Matthew Bannister, denied that not including "Real Love" in the playlist was a ban, saying that it merely meant that the song was not on the playlist of each week's 60 most regularly featured songs. As an act of goodwill, the station produced a "Golden Hour" dedicated to the group's music as well as music by bands influenced by the Beatles. This "Golden Hour" concluded with a playing of "Real Love".

== Later remixes ==
=== 2015 remix ===
On 6 November 2015, Apple Records released a new deluxe version of the 1 album in different editions and variations (known as 1+). Most of the tracks on 1 have been remixed from the original multi-track masters by Giles Martin. Martin and Jeff Lynne also remixed "Real Love" for the DVD and Blu-ray releases. The remix of "Real Love" cleans up Lennon's vocal further, and reinstates several deleted elements originally recorded in 1995, such as lead guitar phrases and drum fills, as well as making the harpsichord and harmonium more prominent in the mix.

=== 2025 remix ===
In 2025, Lynne prepared a new mix of "Real Love" alongside "Free as a Bird" for the compilation Anthology 4, utilizing a "de-mixed" version of Lennon's vocals. The remix was released on 21 November 2025 and met with some negative fan reception over the vocal mixing, alleging that it was created using artificial intelligence. Criticism included the removal of Harrison's guitar phrases during the choruses and its shorter length. The remix was later issued as a separate AA-side alongside the new remix of "Free as a Bird" on 28 November.

== Lyrics and melody ==
The song's lyrics have been interpreted by one reviewer to be conveying the message that "love is the answer to loneliness" and "that connection is the antidote to unreality".

The song was sped up 12% from the demo, apparently to "effect the ... snappy tempo" as Alan W. Pollack has speculated. The tune is nearly completely pentatonic, comprising primarily the notes E, F♯, G♯, B and C♯. The refrain is higher than the verse; while the verse covers a full octave, the refrain, at its peak, is a fifth higher.

The instrumental intro is four measures long, and the verse and refrain are eight measures. The introduction occurs in parallel E minor with the main thrust of the song being in E major, although in the recording the song is in E ♭ minor and the main thrust in E ♭ major as it was sped up from its original speed. There are several other occasions where Lennon moves to a chord from the parallel minor, e.g. in the chorus where the progression moves from a major tonic (I) chord to a minor subdominant (iv) chord. The move to minor harmony happens on the words 'alone' and 'afraid'. This combination of lyrics and harmony turning at the same point is a common Beatles device, and helps give the song a wistful feeling. The outro largely comprises the last half of the refrain repeated seven times, slowly fading out.

== Personnel ==
Sixth take

- John Lennon – lead vocals, acoustic guitar

Beatles version

According to Ian MacDonald and Mark Lewisohn:

- John Lennon – double-tracked lead vocals, piano (1979 and 1980 demo sessions)
- Paul McCartney – backing vocals, acoustic guitar, piano, bass guitar, double bass, harmonium, harpsichord, percussion
- George Harrison – backing vocals, electric guitars, slide guitar, acoustic guitar, banjolele, percussion
- Ringo Starr – drums, percussion

== Track listings ==
All tracks written by Lennon–McCartney, except where noted.

7-inch single (R6425)

1. "Real Love" (Lennon) – 3:54
2. "Baby's in Black" – 3:03
  - Recorded live at the Hollywood Bowl on 29 August 1965 (spoken introduction by Lennon) and 30 August 1965 (song performance)

CD (CDR6425)

1. "Real Love" (Lennon) – 3:54
2. "Baby's in Black" – 3:03
3. "Yellow Submarine" – 2:48
  - Recorded at EMI Studios, London, on 26 May and 1 June 1966. A new remix with a previously unreleased "marching" introduction with the sound effects mixed higher in volume throughout.
4. "Here, There and Everywhere" – 2:23
  - Recorded at EMI Studios, London, on 16 June 1966. This is a combination of take 7 (a mono mix of the basic track with McCartney's guide vocal) with a 1995 stereo remix of the harmony vocals as overdubbed onto take 13 superimposed at the end.

== Charts ==
=== Weekly charts ===
| Chart (1996) | Peak position |
|---|---|
| Australia (ARIA) | 6 |
| Belgium (Ultratop 50 Flanders) | 50 |
| Canada Top Singles (RPM) | 12 |
| Canada Adult Contemporary (RPM) | 38 |
| Czech Republic (IFPI CR) | 2 |
| Denmark (IFPI) | 8 |
| Europe (Eurochart Hot 100) | 5 |
| Finland (Suomen virallinen lista) | 4 |
| France (SNEP) | 36 |
| Germany (GfK) | 45 |
| Hungary (Mahasz) | 8 |
| Ireland (IRMA) | 8 |
| Italy (Musica e dischi) | 6 |
| Netherlands (Dutch Top 40) | 20 |
| Netherlands (Single Top 100) | 21 |
| Scottish Singles Sales (Official Charts) | 4 |
| Sweden (Sverigetopplistan) | 2 |
| Switzerland (Schweizer Hitparade) | 26 |
| UK Singles (Official Charts) | 4 |
| US Billboard Hot 100 | 11 |
| US Cash Box Top 100 | 10 |

=== Year-end charts ===
| Chart (1996) | Rank |
|---|---|
| Canada Top Singles (RPM) | 86 |

== Certifications ==
| Region | Certification | Certified units/sales |
|---|---|---|
| United States (RIAA) | Gold | 500,000^{^} |
^{^} Shipments figures based on certification alone.

== Tom Odell version ==
"Real Love"

Single by Tom Odell
- Released: 6 November 2014
- Genre: Pop
- Length: 2:21
- Label: Sony
- Songwriter: John Lennon

Tom Odell singles chronology
| "I Know" (2013) | "Real Love" (2014) | "Wrong Crowd" (2016) |

In 2014, English singer-songwriter Tom Odell released a cover version of the song. It was released on 6 November 2014 in the United Kingdom as a digital download through Sony. The song was selected as the soundtrack to the John Lewis 2014 Christmas advertisement and was later included on the "Spending All My Christmas With You" EP released in 2016.

Chart performance

On 9 November 2014 (week ending 15 November 2014), "Real Love" debuted at number 21 in the UK Singles Chart with only 3 days of sales, and then reached a new peak of number 7 the following week.

Track listing

Digital download
| No. | Title | Length |
|---|---|---|
| 1. | "Real Love" | 2:21 |

=== Chart performance ===
Weekly charts

| Chart (2014) | Peak position |
|---|---|
| Ireland (IRMA) | 16 |
| Netherlands (Single Top 100) | 89 |
| Scottish Singles Sales (Official Charts) | 9 |
| UK Singles (Official Charts) | 7 |

Release history

| Region | Date | Format | Label |
|---|---|---|---|
| United Kingdom | 6 November 2014 | Digital download | Sony |

== Other versions ==
- Regina Spektor recorded a cover version of "Real Love" for Instant Karma: The Amnesty International Campaign to Save Darfur, released in June 2007. She performed that cover at Bonnaroo the same month.
- Adam Sandler performed the song in the 2009 film Funny People. This version is also found on the film's soundtrack.
- The Last Royals released a cover version of "Real Love" on 1 September 2015.
- Shakey Graves released a cover version of "Real Love" on Bandcamp, 9 February 2020.
