= The Beatles Anthology =

Multimedia project focusing on the history of the Beatles

The Beatles Anthology is a multimedia retrospective project consisting of a television documentary, a four-volume set of double albums, and a book describing the history of the Beatles. Beatles members Paul McCartney, George Harrison and Ringo Starr participated in the making of the works, which are sometimes referred to collectively as the Anthology project, while John Lennon appears in archival interviews.

The first photo of The Beatles reunion was taken on 23 June 1994. From left: Ringo Starr, Paul McCartney and George Harrison.

The documentary series was first broadcast in November 1995, with expanded versions released on VHS and LaserDisc in 1996 and on DVD in 2003. The documentary used interviews with the Beatles and their associates to narrate the history of the band as seen through archival footage and performances. The Anthology book, released in 2000, paralleled the documentary in presenting the group's history through quotes from interviews.

The initial volume of the album set (Anthology 1) was released the same week of the documentary's airdate, with the subsequent two volumes (Anthology 2 and Anthology 3) released in 1996. They included unreleased performances and outtakes presented in roughly chronological order, along with two new songs based on demo tapes recorded by Lennon after the group broke up: "Free as a Bird" and "Real Love", both produced by Jeff Lynne.

The Beatles Anthology 2025 was officially announced on August 21, 2025, featuring a remastered documentary series expanded with an additional ninth episode and a new box set containing a new compilation album, Anthology 4, alongside remastered editions of Anthology 1, 2, and 3. The box set was released on November 21, 2025, and the new series premiered five days later on Disney+.

== Documentary series ==
Approximately coinciding with the release of the "Free as a Bird" single and Anthology 1 album (the first of three double-CD albums), The Beatles Anthology series of documentaries was broadcast on ITV in the United Kingdom and ABC television in the United States in 1995. The Anthology series takes a form similar to that of the Anthology book, by being a series of first-person accounts by the Beatles themselves, with no external "objective" narration. Footage in the Anthology series features voice-over recordings of all four Beatles to push the narrative of the story, with contributions from their producer, road manager and others. As well as telling their story through archival footage, Paul McCartney, George Harrison and Ringo Starr appear in interview segments recorded exclusively for the series; John Lennon appears only in historic archival footage. Other key people in the Beatles story such as producer George Martin, road manager Neil Aspinall, and publicist Derek Taylor also gave extensive interview segments, with manager Brian Epstein appearing in archival footage.

The series, which included over 5000 hours of planning and production, is composed of numerous film clips and interviews that present a complete history of the band from the Beatles' own personal perspectives. When it aired on ABC, the series comprised six hour-long programs, aired on three nights in November 1995. The series was later released as eight expanded episodes on VHS, laserdisc and as a boxed set of five DVDs (four discs with two episodes apiece and a disc of extras).

Air dates on ABC:

- Sunday, 19 November 1995: 9–11 p.m.
- Wednesday, 22 November 1995: 9–11 p.m.
- Thursday, 23 November 1995: 9–11 p.m.

Part 1 of the series drew 17 million households, meaning an average of 27.3 million viewers, which was much better than usual for ABC at the time, but behind most broadcasts of Friends on NBC, which in its second season was averaging 29.4 million viewers per episode.

In promoting the series, ABC identified itself as "A-Beatles-C" – an homage to the mid-1960s "77 W-A-Beatles-C" call sign of the network's flagship NYC AM radio station – and several of the network's prime-time sitcoms replaced their regular opening credit themes with Beatles tracks.

== Albums ==
To accompany the Anthology series, three albums were issued, each containing two CDs, two cassette tapes or three vinyl LPs of mostly never-before-released Beatles material (the exceptions being the Tony Sheridan-era material), although many of the tracks had appeared on bootlegs for many years prior.

Two days after the first television special in the series had aired, Anthology 1 was released to stores, and included music recorded by the Quarrymen, the famous Decca Records audition tapes, and various out-takes and demos from Please Please Me, With the Beatles, A Hard Day's Night and Beatles for Sale. It also included the song "Lend Me Your Comb", omitted from the collection Live at the BBC, released the previous year (1994). The song "Free as a Bird" was included at the very start. Some 450,000 copies of Anthology 1 were sold in its first day of release, the most sales for an album in a single day ever. The band's first drummer Pete Best, replaced by Ringo Starr in 1962 before the Beatles recorded professionally for EMI, received his first substantial Beatles royalties from this album, for the inclusion of early demo tracks on which he played.

Anthology 2 was released on 17 March 1996. The second collection presented out-takes and demos from the Beatles' sessions for Help!, Rubber Soul, Revolver, Sgt. Pepper's Lonely Hearts Club Band and Magical Mystery Tour. These included selected early demos and takes for Lennon's "Strawberry Fields Forever", previously available only to bootleg collectors. The new song "Real Love" – which, like "Free as a Bird", was based on an unfinished Lennon recording – was also included in the two-CD collection.

Anthology 3 was released on 28 October 1996. The third collection featured out-takes and demos from The Beatles ("White Album"), Let It Be and Abbey Road, as well as several songs from Harrison and McCartney which later became post-Beatle tracks.

Mark Lewisohn wrote the liner notes that appear in the booklets accompanying all three audio sets. These notes, including the date and location of each session or appearance, were based on his own extensive research.

Anthology 4 was released on 21 November 2025. It primarily consists of outtakes and rarities that were previously released on box sets.

=== Collage ===
Collage of the three covers of The Beatles Anthology, created by Klaus Voormann.

When laid side-by-side, the album covers of the first three compilations become a single collage of various peeling posters and album covers representing the different stages of the Beatles' career. The artwork was created by Alfons Kiefer and Klaus Voormann, who also created the album cover for Revolver in 1966. The Anthology covers required Voormann to recreate elements of his cover for Revolver within the collage. During the music video for "Free as a Bird", the Anthology collage appears as posters on a shop window as the camera pans quickly across the street. The design also adorned the VHS, laserdisc, and DVD releases, which also allowed the complete image to be shown by placing the cases side-by-side. Upon the release of Anthology 3, HMV stores released a limited edition cardboard sleeve designed to hold all three CD volumes, with each side of the sleeve making up half of the collage.

=== Digital release and Anthology Highlights ===
All three albums were made digitally available on the iTunes Store on 14 June 2011, alongside a new Anthology Highlights album which featured a selection of tracks from all three albums and reached number 184 on Billboard's United States Top Current Albums chart.

==== Anthology Highlights track listing ====
1. "Free as a Bird" – 4:25
2. "One After 909" (Complete) – 2:55
3. "That Means a Lot" – 2:26
4. "Leave My Kitten Alone" – 2:56
5. "If You've Got Trouble" – 2:48
6. "Can't Buy Me Love" – 2:10
7. "Mr. Moonlight" – 2:47
8. "Kansas City / Hey-Hey-Hey-Hey!" – 2:46
9. "Eight Days a Week" (Complete) – 2:47
10. "I'm Looking Through You" – 2:53
11. "Yesterday" – 2:34
12. "Tomorrow Never Knows" (Take 1) – 3:14
13. "Strawberry Fields Forever" (Take 1) – 2:34
14. "Across the Universe" (Take 2) – 3:30
15. "Something" – 3:18
16. "Not Guilty" – 3:22
17. "Octopus's Garden" – 2:49
18. "All Things Must Pass" – 3:04
19. "Come and Get It" – 2:30
20. "Good Night" – 2:38
21. "While My Guitar Gently Weeps" – 3:27
22. "The Long and Winding Road" – 3:41
23. "Real Love" – 3:54

== Book ==
In October 2000, The Beatles Anthology book was released, which included interviews with all four band members and others involved, plus rare photos. Many of the interviews quoted are from those featured in the documentary films. The book is designed as a large-format hardback, with imaginative artwork throughout, and several visually vibrant and colourful spreads featuring graphics relevant to the proceeding chronology, photographic arrays and a variety of text styles and layouts. The book went straight to the top of The New York Times bestsellers list. In 2002, the book was released as a large-format paperback. In October 2025, the book was reissued for its 25th anniversary.

== Anthology Collection box set and Anthology 4 ==
During 2025, fans speculated that a restored and remastered version of the Anthology series would be released to commemorate the 30th anniversary. Following several teasers, it was officially announced on August 21, 2025. The series, premiering on Disney+ on November 26, 2025, has been expanded from eight to nine episodes, with the ninth episode featuring unreleased footage alongside new interviews.

The 2025 remaster project also includes the Anthology Collection, an expanded box set featuring Anthology 4, a new album consisting of additional studio outtakes compiled by Giles Martin, alongside remastered editions of the previous three volumes. The new compilation also features new mixes of "Free as a Bird" and "Real Love", using the demixing technology used in the making of "Now and Then" to isolate and clean up Lennon's vocal track, as well as "Now and Then" itself.

The remasters of the first three Anthology albums were released to streaming services on August 21, 2025 (though they would be removed a day later), along with the 2025 remix of "Free as a Bird" as a digital single. The physical box set of the Anthology Collection was released on November 21, 2025, on both vinyl and CD, with the digital version of the Anthology 4 album also being released to streaming services and digital retailers the same day. The restored documentary series premiered five days later on Disney+.

== Unreleased recordings ==
During early 1995, as work on The Beatles Anthology continued, Yoko Ono and McCartney recorded an avant-garde piece called "Hiroshima Sky Is Always Blue". Ono provided vocals and McCartney played bass, while Sean Lennon, Linda McCartney, and McCartney's children played various instruments. The piece was broadcast on Japanese public television in memory of the 50th anniversary of the atomic bombing of Hiroshima.

The track "Carnival of Light", recorded during the Sgt. Pepper's Lonely Hearts Club Band sessions, was intended to be released on the Anthology 2 album, but was vetoed by George Harrison.

It was reported that McCartney, Harrison and Starr worked on a new composition called "All for Love" in March 1995, intended as a track on Anthology 3, but the effort was abandoned. This has never been confirmed by any member of the band or any individual involved in the Anthology effort, and no version of the song has reached the public.

McCartney, Harrison, Starr, and Jeff Lynne attempted a full band recording of Lennon's song "Now and Then" using his demo vocals, intending it to anchor Anthology 3. The poor fidelity and excessive ambient noise of the original tape proved too difficult to alleviate with contemporary digital equipment, and the song was abandoned. George Harrison was dismissive of the quality of the song, calling it "fucking rubbish". The song was replaced as the opening track on Anthology 3 with "A Beginning", an outtake from the recording sessions for The Beatles (1968). In 2023, McCartney, Starr and Giles Martin refurbished and completed the track, using artificial intelligence to extricate Lennon's vocal from the demo tape, and released it as a "final Beatles song", both as a single and as a bonus track on the expanded edition of the 1967-1970 compilation album.

== Promotional items ==
Each of the three Anthology albums was accompanied by a promotional CD sampler sent to radio stations shortly before the official release dates. These CDs have since become highly sought collector's items. Even rarer is a vinyl version of the sampler for Anthology 2, which was only sent to college radio stations and featured a different cover (though the contents were the same).

In October 1996 there was a strictly limited release from EMI, a slip case cover to house all three CD volumes, which have since become extremely rare, fetching high prices among collectors.

== Parodies ==
The success of the Anthology albums was parodied by the release of the Rutles' Archaeology some months later. Delays in the release of the third volume of the Beatles' series ultimately meant that the Rutles' parody arrived in shops on the same day as its inspiration.

"Weird Al" Yankovic parodied The Beatles Anthology in an Al TV special. He said he had a copy of a fictional Anthology 17, which he claimed would not be available to the public for a while. He played for the audience a track of Paul McCartney brushing his teeth and Ringo Starr shaving before The Ed Sullivan Show. Yankovic also considered parodying the album's single "Free as a Bird" as "Gee, I'm a Nerd", and requested McCartney's permission for the parody. McCartney had no problem with the parody; however, since "Free as a Bird" was written by John Lennon, he deferred the decision to Yoko Ono, who was not comfortable with the idea.

The Beatles Anthology was also parodied on the short-lived Dana Carvey Show, which was being aired on ABC around the same time that Anthology was being televised on the network.

On Late Night with Conan O'Brien, the host had parodies of the remaining Beatles adding music and doing backup singing to a fictitious vocal track from John Lennon's answering machine.
