= Now and Then (Beatles song) =

2023 single by the Beatles

Single by the Beatles

from the album 1967–1970 (2023 edition) and Anthology 4
- A-side: "Love Me Do" (double A-side)
- Released: 2 November 2023
- Recorded: c. 1977, 1995, 2021–2022 (Note: The final product was recorded on multiple occasions: 6 June 1966 (backing vocals from "Eleanor Rigby"); 14 June 1966 (backing vocals from "Here, There and Everywhere"); 4 August 1969 (backing vocals from "Because"); c. 1977 (Lennon's lead vocals); 2 February 1995 (Harrison's acoustic and electric guitars); 2 February 2021 (McCartney's guitar solo); 9 July 2021 (McCartney's bass lines); 12 July 2021 (McCartney's vocals); 9 April 2022 (Starr's drums); 1 May 2022 (orchestra))
- Studio: The Dakota (New York City); Friar Park (Oxfordshire); Hogg Hill Mill (Icklesham); Abbey Road (London); Capitol (Los Angeles); Roccabella West (Los Angeles)
- Genre: Rock; soft rock; psychedelia
- Length: 4:08
- Label: Apple
- Songwriters: John Lennon (original composition) Lennon; Paul McCartney; George Harrison; Ringo Starr (The Beatles version)
- Producers: McCartney; Giles Martin; Jeff Lynne (additional production)

The Beatles singles chronology
"Real Love" (1996)	"Now and Then" / "Love Me Do" (2023)

Music video
- "Now and Then" on YouTube

"Now and Then" is a song by the English rock band the Beatles, released on 2 November 2023. Dubbed "the last Beatles song", it appeared on a double A-side single, paired with a new stereo remix of the band's first single, "Love Me Do" (1962), with the two serving as "bookends" to the band's history. The song is included on the expanded re-issue of the 1973 compilation 1967–1970, released on 10 November 2023. That same day, the single reached number one on the UK Singles Chart.

"Now and Then" originated as a ballad that John Lennon wrote and recorded around 1977 as a solo home demo but left unfinished. After Lennon's death in 1980, the song was considered as a potential third Beatles reunion single for their 1995–1996 retrospective project The Beatles Anthology, following "Free as a Bird" and "Real Love", both based on two other Lennon demos of the same names. Instead, due to production difficulties, it was shelved for nearly three decades, until it was completed by his surviving bandmates Paul McCartney and Ringo Starr, using overdubs and guitar tracks by George Harrison (who died in 2001) from the abandoned 1995 sessions.

The final version features additional lyrics by McCartney. Lennon's voice was extracted from the demo using the machine learning–assisted audio restoration technology commissioned by Peter Jackson for his 2021 documentary The Beatles: Get Back. Jackson also directed the music video for "Now and Then". The song received widespread acclaim from critics, who felt it was a worthy finale for the Beatles. It topped the charts in the United Kingdom, Germany, and Austria, and reached the top ten in Australia, Belgium, Canada, Ireland, Japan, the Netherlands, Sweden, Switzerland, and the United States. It is the only Beatles UK number-one single not attributed to the Lennon–McCartney songwriting partnership. The song was first performed live by McCartney on 1 October 2024 as part of his Got Back tour at the Estadio Centenario of Montevideo. "Now and Then" won Best Rock Performance and was nominated for Record of the Year in the 67th Annual Grammy Awards.

== Composition and history ==
John Lennon wrote "Now and Then" in the late 1970s, and recorded a five-minute piano demo around 1977 on a tape recorder at his home at the Dakota in New York City. The lyrics are typical of the apologetic love songs that Lennon wrote in the latter half of his career. For the most part the verses were nearly complete, though there are still a few lines that Lennon did not flesh out on the demo tape performance. Writing for the Los Angeles Times, Stephen Thomas Erlewine called Lennon's song "a wispy, melancholy ballad".

Referring to the original demo, Craig Jenkins of Vulture said, "'Now and Then' languished in an unfinished state, its vocal and piano melodies enshrouded in too dense a thicket of abrasively scratchy hiss to massage into the high-quality recordings the Beatles were known for".

=== Beatles' first version with Harrison ===
In January 1994, the year Lennon was posthumously inducted into the Rock and Roll Hall of Fame, his widow, Yoko Ono, gave Paul McCartney two cassette tapes she had previously mentioned to George Harrison. The tapes, which both had a note on them reading "For Paul", included home recordings of songs that Lennon had never completed and/or released commercially, two of them on one tape being the eventually completed and released "Free as a Bird" and "Real Love". The two other songs on the other tape were "Grow Old with Me" and "Now and Then". "Grow Old with Me" had already been released in 1984 on the posthumous album Milk and Honey, so the Beatles turned their attention to "Now and Then". In March 1995, the three surviving Beatles began to work on it by recording a rough backing track that was to be used as an overdub. It included acoustic guitars played by McCartney and Harrison, a rough drum track by Ringo Starr, an electric guitar by Harrison, and a bass and "a few synth [things]" played by McCartney." However, after several days of recording, all work on the song ceased and plans for a third reunion single were scrapped.

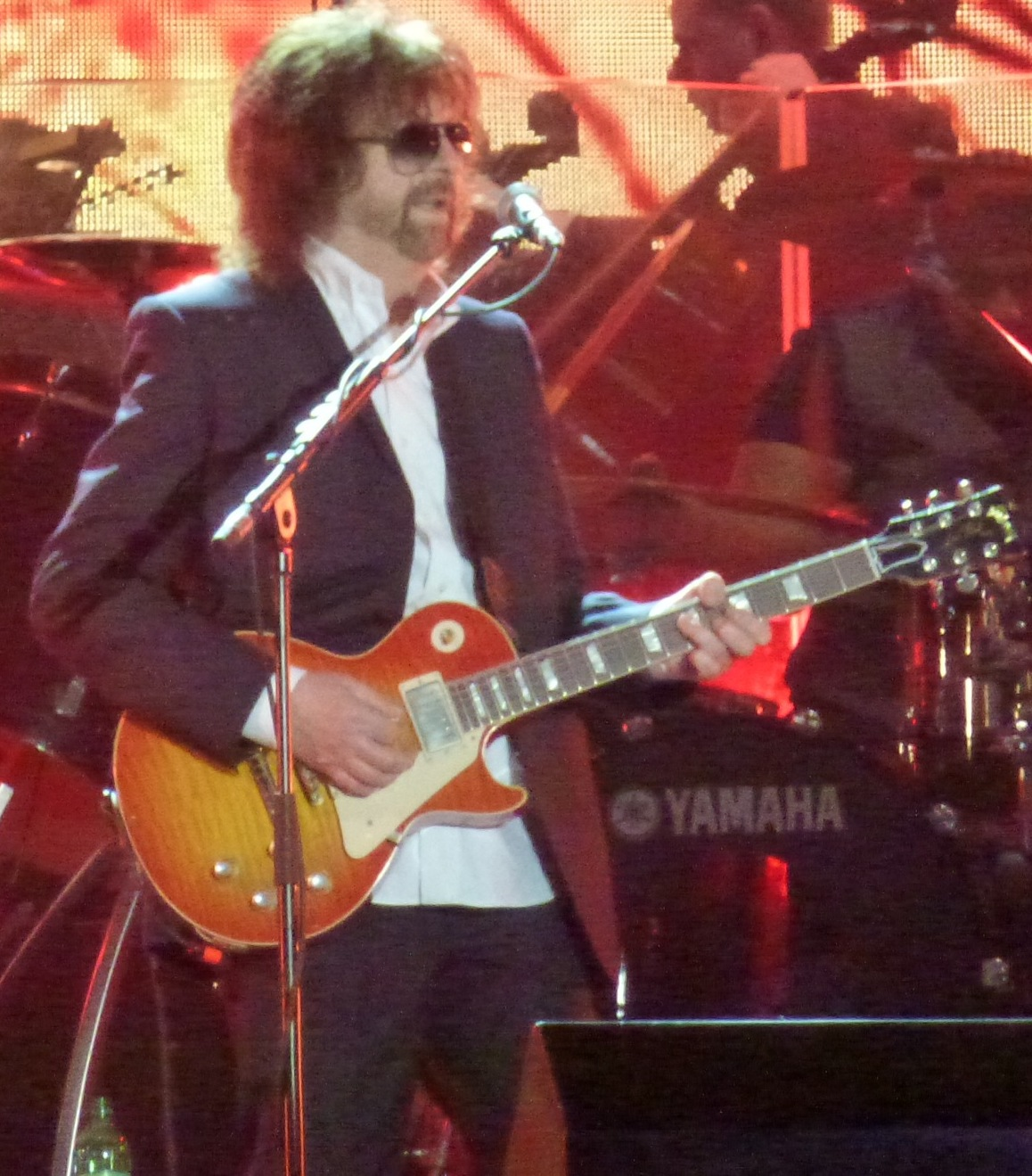
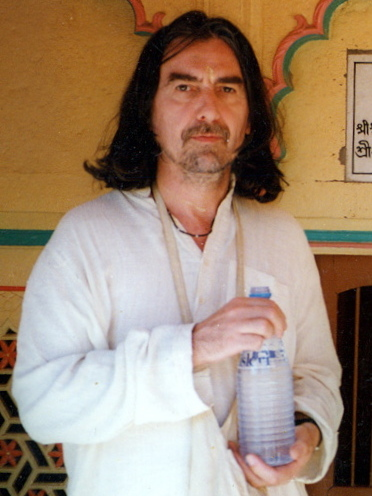
Jeff Lynne (left, pictured in 2014) co-produced an initial Beatles' version of "Now and Then" in 1995, only for it to be scrapped due to George Harrison's (right, pictured in 1996) dislike of the demo's poor sound quality.

Producer Jeff Lynne reported that sessions for "Now and Then" actually consisted only of "one day – one afternoon, really – messing with it. The song had a chorus but is almost totally lacking in verses. We did the backing track, a rough go that we really didn't finish". Additional factors behind scrapping the song were that the piano Lennon was playing on during his demo recording was noisy, which kept drowning out Lennon's vocals, as well as a technical defect in the original recording. As with "Real Love", a 60-Hz mains hum can be heard throughout the demo recording. However, it was noticeably louder on "Now and Then", making it considerably more difficult to remove.

The project was largely shelved because of Harrison's dislike of the song due to its low-quality recording. McCartney later stated that Harrison called Lennon's demo recording "fucking rubbish". McCartney told Q magazine in 1997 that "George didn't like it. The Beatles being a democracy, we didn't do it." Some such as Ben Lindbergh of The Ringer later speculated that, given Harrison had said "Apart from the quality, which was worse than the other two ['Free as a Bird' and 'Real Love'], I didn't think ['Now and Then'] was much of a song", he might have been critical of the song itself and not merely the recording quality. When the Beatles released their version of the song in 2023, Harrison's widow Olivia issued a press release stating: "George felt the technical issues with the demo were insurmountable and concluded that it was not possible to finish the track to a high enough standard. If he were here today, Dhani and I know he would have wholeheartedly joined Paul and Ringo in completing the recording of 'Now and Then.'"

=== Period of limbo (1996–2021) ===
Throughout 2005 and 2006, press reports speculated that McCartney and Starr would release a complete version of the song in the future. Reports circulated in 2007 that McCartney was hoping to complete the song as a "Lennon–McCartney composition" by writing new verses, utilizing archival recordings of backing vocals and guitar work from Harrison (who had died in 2001), and laying down a new drum track recorded by Starr.

Prior to the 2023 release, the only available recording of the song was from Lennon's original demo. In February 2009, the same version of Lennon's recording was released on a bootleg CD, taken from a different source, with none of the "buzz" which hampered the Beatles' recording of the song in 1995.

During a Lynne documentary shown on BBC Four in 2012, McCartney stated about the song: "And there was another one that we started working on, but George went off it... that one's still lingering around, so I'm going to nick in with Jeff and do it. Finish it, one of these days." McCartney said in October 2021 that he still hoped to finish the track.

=== MAL restoration and final version ===
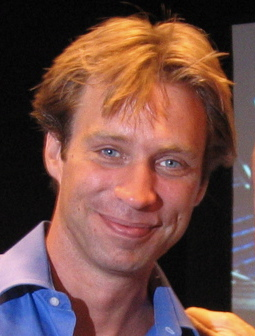
Giles Martin co-produced the final song.

For the 2021 documentary series The Beatles: Get Back, director Peter Jackson's production company WingNut Films isolated instruments, vocals, and individual conversations utilising its audio restoration technology over a four-year period. The neural network, called MAL (machine-assisted learning) – named after the Beatles' former road manager Mal Evans, and as a pun to HAL 9000 of 2001: A Space Odyssey – was also later used for the 2022 remix of the 1966 album Revolver, based directly on four-track master tapes. WingNut applied the same technique to Lennon's home recording of "Now and Then", while preserving the clarity of his vocal performance separated from the piano. The studio worked on a digital copy of the original tape provided by Sean Lennon, which was of much better quality than the third-generation copy that the three surviving Beatles had used in 1995. Lennon's vocals were isolated from his solo piano demo, which finally allowed the song to be finished. McCartney recorded bass guitar, a slide guitar solo in the style of Harrison as a tribute to him, electric harpsichord, backing vocals, and piano in the style of Lennon's demo in his home studio in East Sussex while Starr later recorded a finalized drum track and backing vocals in his home studio in Los Angeles. Additionally, Harrison's guitar parts (both acoustic and electric) from the 1995 sessions were inserted into the song.

External video
- Giles Martin explains the techniques behind "Now and Then": “AI isn't creating John's voice"

The restoration was followed by the addition of a string section written by McCartney, Giles Martin (the son of Beatles' former producer and longtime collaborator George Martin), and Ben Foster, recorded at Capitol Studios. The piece was given the decoy name of "Give & Take" to avoid leaks from the musicians and recorded during late April 2022. Finally, McCartney and Martin added portions of original vocal recordings of "Here, There and Everywhere", "Eleanor Rigby" (both from Revolver), and "Because" (from the 1969 album Abbey Road) into the new song, following the methods used for the 2006 remix album Love. Ben Lindbergh of The Ringer contrasted the original recording to the released version: "McCartney collaborates with his former muse not just by building on Lennon's work, but by undoing it. The Beatles release is almost a minute shorter than the Lennon demo, largely because the latter includes two pre-chorus bridges that the former removes (aside from a subtle, hard-to-hear allusion in McCartney's piano chords during the new solo)". Speaking about the removal of the pre-chorus bridge, McCartney said "It had a big middle section and I thought it rambled a bit. I thought to myself, Well, if I was working with John now ... I'd say, 'We've got to do something about that middle and maybe even remove it. I think it'll make the song stronger.' So we did. I think he would have been OK with that. Of course I'm never going to know but, y'know, I think mine's the best guess we can have." The finished track was produced by McCartney and Martin, while Lynne was credited for "additional production", and mixed by Spike Stent. Meanwhile, the stereo and Dolby Atmos mixes, alongside the vinyl mastering, were completed at Abbey Road Studios.

On 13 June 2023, McCartney told BBC Radio 4's Today programme that he had "just finished" work on extracting Lennon's voice from an old demo of the latter's in order to complete the song, using (in his words) artificial intelligence. Dubbing the project "the final Beatles record", he did not name the song; however, BBC News reported it was likely that the song is "Now and Then" and that it would be released later in 2023. On the use of AI for sound source separation, McCartney clarified in June 2023 that "nothing has been artificially or synthetically created. It's all real and we all play on it. We cleaned up some existing recordings – a process which has gone on for years."

== Packaging ==
=== Front cover ===
Ed Ruscha designed the front cover of the packaging for the vinyl release of the single. Ruscha, known for his use of text elements in his artworks, also produced the cover art for Paul McCartney's album McCartney III.

=== Back cover ===
Back cover art for the "Now and Then" single by The Beatles vinyl release

The design of the back cover art for the vinyl single incorporates a photograph of a handmade, folk art clock made from recycled materials by artist Chris Giffin which had been purchased by George Harrison in Providence, Rhode Island during a 1997 trip to visit his son Dhani who was attending Brown University. According to Olivia Harrison, George's widow, in the summer of 2022, after she had recently cleaned the clock and replaced its battery, Paul McCartney called her to discuss plans for the release of the new Beatles single "Now and Then". As she was speaking with McCartney, she looked up at the clock's face whose design included the words "Now" and "Then". Olivia reported that she was "dumbfounded" by the coincidence and felt that it seemed like a sign from her deceased husband that he would have approved of the release of the song. For the photograph of the clock, Olivia Harrison made an alteration to the original composition of elements on the face of the clock: She added a photograph of The Beatles onto the clock, which replaced an old sepia tone photograph of a Victorian family which had been included in the original design. She also called the artist to get approval and permission for the use of the clock in the design of the cover art for the single.

== Promotion ==
On 25 October 2023, an image of an orange-and-white cassette tape with the tape reel winding was published on the Beatles' official website and official social media accounts. The bottom left of the tape read "Type I (Normal) Position", and the copyright section read "Yoko Ono Lennon, MPL Communications Ltd, G. H. Estate Ltd and Startling Music Ltd". The following day, the song was announced as a double A-side single for a release date of 2 November 2023, backed with a new stereo remix of "Love Me Do" – with both songs also featured on the expanded re-issues of the 1973 compilations 1962–1966 and 1967–1970.

A 12-minute documentary film, Now and Then – The Last Beatles Song, written and directed by British filmmaker Oliver Murray, debuted on 1 November 2023 on the Beatles' YouTube channel, Disney+, and linear channels including CBC Television in Canada, and TVN24 in Poland. The short film tells the story of the song's inception, including commentaries by McCartney, Starr, Harrison, Sean Lennon, and Jackson. The film also played excerpts of John Lennon's separated vocal tracks and from the final song.

To celebrate the release of "Now and Then", animated projection mappings of the cassette tape from the Beatles' website popped up at Beatles-related locations across Liverpool, including the Strawberry Field, the road sign for Penny Lane, outside Lennon's childhood home, and the Cavern Club.

The BBC prepared an extended edition of The One Show on BBC One, BBC Radio 2 podcast series Eras: The Beatles hosted by Martin Freeman, as well as other programming on BBC Two and the BBC iPlayer. In the United States, iHeartMedia said it would premiere "Now and Then" simultaneously over 740 of its radio stations, with the song repeated hourly for the rest of the day on the company's classic rock stations. SiriusXM said the song also premiered on The Beatles Channel at the moment it was released.

== Music video ==
A music video for "Now and Then", directed by Peter Jackson, premiered on 3 November 2023. It features footage of the Beatles, including a snippet of a newly found film of the band from 1962 provided by Pete Best, scenes filmed during the 1995 recording sessions for Anthology, home movie footage of Lennon and Harrison and of the group taken from the "Hello Goodbye" 1967 promotional films juxtaposed by Wētā FX with recent footage of McCartney and Starr performing backing vocals and their bass and drums parts in 2023 and McCartney during the recording of the orchestra.

Jackson personally directed the "Now and Then" music video, filming new footage of McCartney and Starr and using restored old footage similarly to Get Back to have all four Beatles visually on-screen. In an interview days before the song's release, Jackson claimed that he had originally been "very reluctant" due to the heavy responsibility of directing the video, stating: "I knew The Beatles don’t take no for an answer if their minds are set on something - but they didn’t even wait for me to say no. I found myself swept along as they quickly addressed my concerns. Paul and Ringo shot footage of themselves performing and sent that to me. Apple unearthed over 14 hours of long forgotten film shot during the 1995 recording sessions, including several hours of Paul, George and Ringo working on Now And Then, and gave all that to me. Sean and Olivia found some great unseen home movie footage and sent that. To cap things off, a few precious seconds of The Beatles performing in their leather suits, the earliest known film of The Beatles and never seen before, was kindly supplied by Pete Best. Watching this footage completely changed the situation - I could see how a music video could be made. Actually, I found it far easier if I thought of it as making a short movie, so that's what I did… My lack of confidence with music videos didn't matter anymore if I wasn't making one."

About the middle section of the video, Jackson stated: "Our initial plan of having similar emotional power continue through this middle section would be completely wrong. That was not who The Beatles were. At their core they were irreverent and funny, and the middle section should capture that spirit. We needed to laugh at The Beatles, and laugh with them. They were always sending themselves up - and the more seriously other people took them, the more they would clown around."

== Reception ==
=== Critical reception ===
On review aggregator Metacritic, the single has a weighted average review score of 87 out of 100 from 7 critics, indicating "universal acclaim". In the first review published for its completed incarnation, Erlewine wrote in the Los Angeles Times that the track was "elegant [and] softly psychedelic" with "a wistful undercurrent", calling it "a fitting conclusion to the Beatles' recorded career – not so much a summation [but rather] a coda that conveys a sense of what the band both achieved and lost". In The Guardian, Alexis Petridis gave the song four stars out of five, calling it "a poignant act of closure". Rob Sheffield of Rolling Stone called it "the final masterpiece that the Beatles—and their fans—deserve". Ed Power of The Irish Times praised Lennon's vocals on the track, deeming it "a 2023 pop odyssey sure to warm the cockles of Beatles fans young, old and in-between".

Vulture's Craig Jenkins said the tune had lyrics and orchestral flourishes similar to "The Long and Winding Road", writing "If this is the end of the Beatles, they have left us with a snapshot of their strengths." The Arizona Republic's Ed Masley praised the song for making him cry repeatedly, saying he could not ask for more from a Beatles song. In Clash, Robin Murray said the "beautiful" single felt like McCartney's "super-human attempt to re-frame the group's ending. Instead of rancour, unity. Instead of solo competition, studio unity. Instead of losing his friends, finding their voices once more." Mark Beaumont of The Independent gave the tune a perfect five-star rating, writing "Sorry Swifties, hard luck Elton, in your face Sphere – this is the musical event of the year and one of the greatest tear-jerkers in history."

Other critics felt "Now and Then" did not live up to some of the band's previous songs. Geoff Edgers of The Washington Post wrote that the song was "kind of mundane"; of its inclusion on the 1967–1970 reissue, he concluded, "A passable song is simply not good enough when you're sharing vinyl with 'Strawberry Fields Forever', 'A Day in the Life' or 'Let It Be.'" For The New York Times, Jon Pareles concluded, "Its existence matters more than its quality ... The song can't compare to the music the four Beatles made together in the 1960s. All it can do is remind listeners of a synergy, musical and personal, that's now lost forever." Comparing the song to the other posthumous Beatles releases "Free as a Bird" and "Real Love", Mark Richardson wrote for Pitchfork: "To my ear, 'Now and Then' is the weakest of the posthumous singles ... 'Now and Then' is pretty much impossible to imagine as an actual Beatles song, and it seems especially far from what might have been Lennon's original intention. And yet, it's enjoyable just the same." Ben Lindbergh of The Ringer wrote: "I can't help but be a bit let down by the bridge's omission. Without those surprising, distinctly Lennon-esque digressions, the song's structure is simpler and more repetitive."

Russell Root wrote for Salon that the song was "not a Beatles song, but rather a Beatles tribute song", noting that "the studio versions of ['Free as a Bird' and 'Real Love'] stay truer to both the original demos and the Beatles' own sound." Jem Aswad of Variety said, "So in the end, 'Now and Then' is not a lost Beatles classic. But to paraphrase McCartney's famous quote regarding criticism of The White Album, 'It's a bloody new Beatles song, shut up!'"

Mastering engineer Ian Shepherd noted the lack of dynamics in the stereo version, also pointing out that the Dolby Atmos version does not suffer from the loudness war problems. Miles Showell confirmed that the mix he received was heavily limited.

In November 2023, Ultimate Classic Rock named "Now and Then" the third-best rock song of 2023.

=== Accolades ===
"Now and Then" was nominated for Record of the Year and won Best Rock Performance at the 67th Annual Grammy Awards, marking the group's first nomination since 1997. The nomination was also historically significant as the first artificial intelligence-assisted track to be nominated for a Grammy Award.

=== Music video ===
Peter Jackson's music video was met with polarized reviews, with praise for its emotional weight but criticism regarding the insertion of Harrison and Lennon into more recent footage. In a mixed review, Mark Woods of the Beatles-themed website Zap stated: "I have read the Peter Jackson interviews, heard his approach to it and knew that not only did he have the Anthology session footage but also an unseen clip courtesy of Pete Best, and my mind had put together a chronological journey through Beatledom. A then and now if you will. What we got was much different, experimental in many ways, a mix of archive footage and CGI that for me felt at odds with the wistful longing on the song itself." However, he recognized that there are "parts of the 'Now and Then' video to be adored and admired here."

Mary Kate Carr of The A.V. Club stated that the video "works best when focused on the archival footage of the band working on the track; the blend of present-day McCartney and Starr with Sgt. Pepper-era Lennon and Harrison is jarring and frankly, a little goofy [...] Nevertheless, Beatle fanatics may find themselves charmed by the time capsule quality of the video, which travels backward through the group’s career all the way through to childhood photos and footage of the four members."

In a positive review, Purav Menon of The Oxford Student stated: "Though [the inserted Harrison and Lennon] can border a little on the uncanny valley side, the video is an emotional experience, particularly the final third, which takes the Beatles all the way back in time to their beginnings as the Quarrymen in the Cavern Club in Liverpool. The song finishes with the Beatles bowing following a live concert, and then disappearing from the frame, a creative decision from Jackson that almost brought a tear to my eye (even as someone who wasn’t old enough to experience half of the band being alive, yet alone performing and releasing music!)." Conversely, Sam Adams of Slate called it "an abomination" that "shows that Peter Jackson has really, truly lost it" and that he "wants to do more than collapse the decades; he wants to erase them."

== Chart performance ==
"Now and Then" debuted on the UK Singles Chart on 3 November 2023 at number 42, based on ten hours of sales. The following week it rose 41 positions to reach number one on the chart, the Beatles' only UK number one song in 54 years since their 1969 single "The Ballad of John and Yoko", setting a record for the longest gap between number one singles by any musical act. Furthermore, it became the only song co-written by Starr to top the UK chart. It accumulated 78,000 units in its first full week of sales and streaming with 48,000 from physical sales and downloads.

In the United States, it debuted at number one on the Billboard Digital Song Sales chart for the week ending 11 November 2023. The song sold 17,000 downloads, all on 2 November, the final day of the chart's tracking week. That same week, it also debuted at number 5 on the Billboard Bubbling Under Hot 100 chart. "Now and Then" debuted at number 7 on the Billboard Hot 100 dated 18 November, and was their 35th top ten single on that chart with 73,000 units sold. "Now and Then" reached number one on the Billboard Adult Alternative Airplay chart for the week ending 9 December 2023, and was the band's only number one on a Billboard radio airplay chart since "Let It Be" topped the Adult Contemporary chart in April 1970.

== In popular culture ==
The song was used at several points in the 2024 film Argylle, along with an orchestral version of the track produced for the film.

== Personnel ==
=== The Beatles ===
Credits from Matt Hurwitz, BBC News, and Alexander Panetta.

- John Lennon – lead and backing vocals
- Paul McCartney – lead and backing vocals, bass, lap steel guitar, acoustic rhythm guitar, piano, electric harpsichord, shaker
- George Harrison – backing vocals, acoustic and electric rhythm guitars
- Ringo Starr – backing vocals, drums, tambourine, shaker

=== Additional musicians ===
- Neel Hammond, Adrianne Pope, Charlie Bisharat, Andrew Bulbrook, Songa Lee, Serena McKinney – violin
- Ayvren Harrison, Caroline Buckman, Drew Forde, Linnea Powell – viola
- Mia Barcia-Colombo, Giovanna Clayton, Hillary Smith – cello
- Mike Valerio – double bass
- Jérôme Leroy – conductor

=== Production ===
- Paul McCartney, Giles Martin, Ben Foster – string arrangement
- Produced by Paul McCartney and Giles Martin, with additional production by Jeff Lynne
- Mark "Spike" Stent – stereo mix
- Giles Martin, Sam Okell – Atmos mixes
- Miles Showell – vinyl mastering
- Oli Morgan – Atmos mastering
- Bruce Sugar, Steve Genewick, Greg McAllister, Geoff Emerick, Keith Smith, Mark "Spike" Stent, Steve Orchard, Jon Jacobs – engineering

== Charts ==
=== Weekly charts ===
Weekly chart performance for "Now and Then"
Chart (2023–24)	Peak position
Australia (ARIA)	6
Austria (Ö3 Austria Top 40)	1
Belgium (Ultratop 50 Flanders)	8
Belgium (Ultratop 50 Wallonia)	15
Canada Hot 100 (Billboard)	10
Croatia (HRT)	2
Czech Republic Singles Digital (ČNS IFPI)	66
Denmark (Tracklisten)	32
Finland (Suomen virallinen lista)	47
France (SNEP)	14
Germany (GfK)	1
Global 200 (Billboard)	10
Iceland (Tónlistinn)	19
Ireland (IRMA)	4
Italy (FIMI)	52
Japan Hot 100 (Billboard)	30
Japan (Oricon)	5
Japan Combined Singles (Oricon)	27
Japan Rock Singles (Oricon)	1
Latvia Airplay (LAIPA)	16
Netherlands (Dutch Top 40)	34
Netherlands (Single Top 100)	5
New Zealand (Recorded Music NZ)	17
Norway (VG-lista)	15
Poland (Polish Airplay Top 100)	54
Poland (Polish Streaming Top 100)	78
San Marino (SMRRTV Top 50)	16
Slovakia Airplay (ČNS IFPI)	75
Slovakia Singles Digital (ČNS IFPI)	94
South Korea BGM (Circle)	32
South Korea Download (Circle)	124
Spain (Promusicae)	54
Sweden (Sverigetopplistan)	8
Switzerland (Schweizer Hitparade)	2
UK Singles (Official Charts)	1
US Billboard Hot 100	7
US Hot Rock & Alternative Songs (Billboard)	2
US Rock & Alternative Airplay (Billboard)	23

=== Monthly charts ===
Monthly chart performance for "Now and Then"
Chart (2023)	Position
Japan (Oricon)	23
Japan Rock Singles (Oricon)	1
Paraguay (SGP)	91

=== Year-end charts ===
Year-end chart performance for "Now and Then"
Chart (2023)	Position
UK Vinyl Singles (OCC)	1

Chart (2024)	Position
US Digital Song Sales (Billboard)	41
US Hot Rock & Alternative Songs (Billboard)	67

== Certifications ==
Certifications for "Now and Then"
Region	Certification	Certified units/sales
Brazil (Pro-Música Brasil)	Platinum	40,000^{‡}
United Kingdom (BPI)	Silver	200,000^{‡}
^{‡} Sales+streaming figures based on certification alone.

== Release history ==
Release dates and formats for "Now and Then"
Region	Date	Format	Label	Ref.
Italy	2 November 2023	Radio airplay	Universal	
Various	2 November 2023	Digital download; streaming	Apple	
United Kingdom	3 November 2023	7-inch; 12-inch; cassette; CD single; 10-inch	Apple	
United States	10 November 2023	7-inch; 12-inch; cassette; CD single; 10-inch	Apple	
Japan	1 December 2023	SHM-CD	Universal	
