= Soft-Hearted Hana =

- Canadian single label (B-side)

Song by George Harrison

from the album George Harrison
- Released: 20 February 1979
- Genre: Music hall, old-time
- Length: 4:03
- Label: Dark Horse
- Songwriter(s): George Harrison
- Producer(s): George Harrison, Russ Titelman

George Harrison track listing
- 10 tracks Side one: 1. "Love Comes to Everyone"; 2. "Not Guilty"; 3. "Here Comes the Moon"; 4. "Soft-Hearted Hana"; 5. "Blow Away"; Side two: 6. "Faster"; 7. "Dark Sweet Lady"; 8. "Your Love Is Forever"; 9. "Soft Touch"; 10. "If You Believe"

"Soft-Hearted Hana" is a song by English rock musician George Harrison from his 1979 album George Harrison. In North America, it was also issued as the B-side of the album's lead single, "Blow Away", while in Britain and some other markets it was the B-side of the follow-up, "Love Comes to Everyone". The lyrics recall Harrison's experiences under the hallucinatory effects of magic mushrooms while holidaying on the Hawaiian island of Maui. The song title refers to Hana, a remote town on the island, and is a play on that of the 1920s ragtime tune "Hard Hearted Hannah".

Harrison began writing the song in Los Angeles in response to Ted Templeman, a staff producer at Warner Bros. Records, suggesting he compose something in a similar style to his 1971 track "Deep Blue". He wrote the lyrics in Hawaii in February 1978, during the main writing period for George Harrison, his first album in over two years. Recorded at Harrison's FPSHOT studio in Oxfordshire, the track features dobro, jazz piano, tuba and prominent chorus vocals, as well as voices and sounds captured in his local pub. The musical arrangement recalls the music hall tradition, while the composition's old-time qualities reflect Harrison's earliest influences from the pre-rock and roll era. The other musicians on the recording include Neil Larsen and Stevie Winwood.

The song's lyrics employ, variously, psychedelic imagery, rhyming slang, humorous non sequiturs and John Keats-like symbolism. The song was well received by several music critics and revealed a comedic side of Harrison that was relatively unfamiliar to listeners. Author Simon Leng recognises "Soft-Hearted Hana" as the start of the "Pythonization of Harrison's music", referring to the Monty Python comedy troupe and Harrison's role as a film producer of British comedies such as Monty Python's Life of Brian.

== Background and inspiration ==
I hadn't had any psychedelic drugs for almost ten years, so I thought maybe I should have it to just see if it reminds me of anything. You have to be careful with mushrooms because they're so good … I nearly did myself in; I had too many. I fell over and left my body, hit my head on a piece of concrete – but they were great.

– George Harrison, 1987

Having taken most of 1977 off to travel with the Formula 1 World Championship, George Harrison decided to record a new album of songs to satisfy the demands of his racing driver friends and to repay the patience of Warner Bros. Records, the company that distributed his Dark Horse record label. During a conversation about the album in Los Angeles with the company's executives, Ted Templeman, a Warner's staff producer, expressed his admiration for "Deep Blue", the B-side of Harrison's 1971 single "Bangla Desh"; Templeman suggested he write another song in that style. Harrison came up with the music for the new song that night, using similar chords to "Deep Blue". (Note: As reproduced in his 1980 autobiography, I, Me, Mine, Harrison's handwritten lyrics for "Soft-Hearted Hana" include the parenthetical title "Son of Deep Blue".) He said that it was a "more 'up'" tune than "Deep Blue", which was "down" and written about his mother's deterioration from cancer, but he was unable to find the right lyrics at first.

Harrison then went to Hana on the Hawaiian island of Maui in February 1978, where he finished the song during a fruitful period for his songwriting. He titled it "Soft-Hearted Hana" after the town of Hana, and as a play on the title of "Hard Hearted Hannah (The Vamp of Savannah)". The latter was a 1920s ragtime standard that Harrison had become familiar with through a 1961 recording by the Temperance Seven, which was produced by George Martin, the Beatles' producer. Harrison's inspiration for the "crazy" lyrics came from ingesting magic mushrooms, which he said was his first experience of hallucinogenic drugs for perhaps ten years. He also wrote "Here Comes the Moon" during this time, drawing inspiration again from the lush natural surroundings on Maui and from the magic mushrooms. Another new composition was "Sooty Goes to Hawaii", a comedy song that Harrison wrote about Sooty, the popular glove puppet character from British television. Olivia Harrison – Harrison's girlfriend at the time, and soon to be his wife – recalls that this visit represented the start of their "love affair with Hawaii", as well as providing the inspiration for "Soft-Hearted Hana" and other songs on the 1979 album George Harrison.

== Composition ==
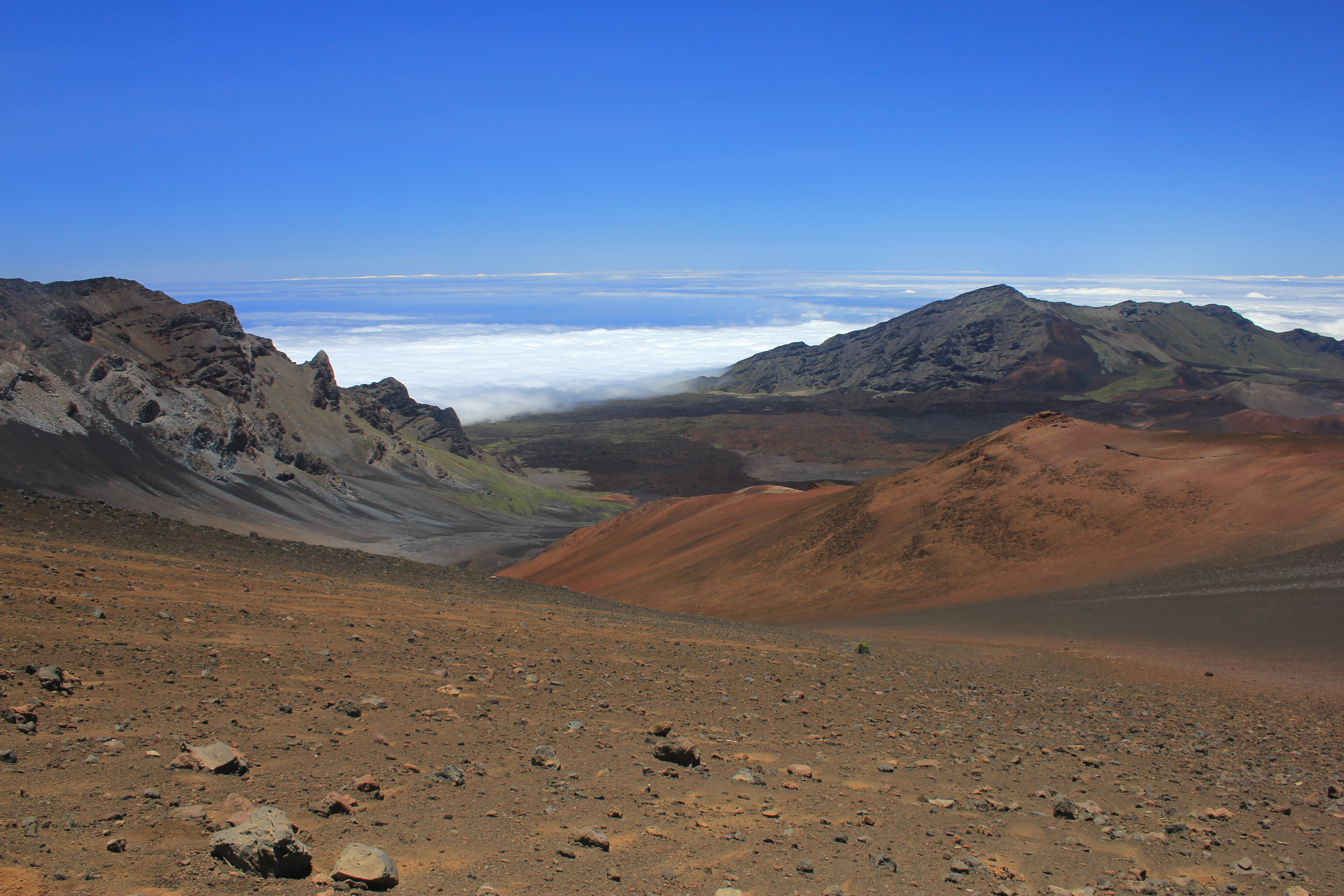
Harrison's lyrics refer to Haleakala crater on Maui.

Author Simon Leng says that "Soft-Hearted Hana" was Harrison's "first obvious drug song" since his 1967 composition for the Beatles "It's All Too Much". He recognises the mood as similar to Harrison's rustic, Band-inspired songs on his 1970 triple album All Things Must Pass, while author Robert Rodriguez describes the song as old-time music. In the lyrics, Harrison recounts his episode under the influence of mushrooms, and recalls their hallucinatory powers. Among the psychedelic imagery he employs, he describes the sensation of feeling elevated far above the ground, with his legs appearing to be "like high-rise buildings" and his head so "high up in the sky" that he began to "fry like bacon".

Author Ian Inglis identifies several "Dylanesque characters" in the narrative, including "Richard III", "Seven naked native girls" and "Lone-ranger smoking doobies". Another individual asks Harrison whether they had not just met "up on Haleakala", referring to the volcanic crater overlooking Hana. These phrases appear in the song's two middle-eights, which are separated by an instrumental passage played over the same chord sequence as the verses. Inglis comments that whereas Harrison's songs from earlier in the 1970s "Simply Shady" and "Tired of Midnight Blue" offer a self-rebuke on drug-taking, the singer reacts to the characters he encounters in "Soft-Hearted Hana" with the statement: "I'm still smiling." Leng notes the effectiveness of the rhyming slang in Harrison's reference to Richard III, (Note: In Cockney rhyming slang, Richard III translates as "turd".) and says that the second middle eight represents "the longest string of deliberate non sequiturs" in Harrison's oeuvre:

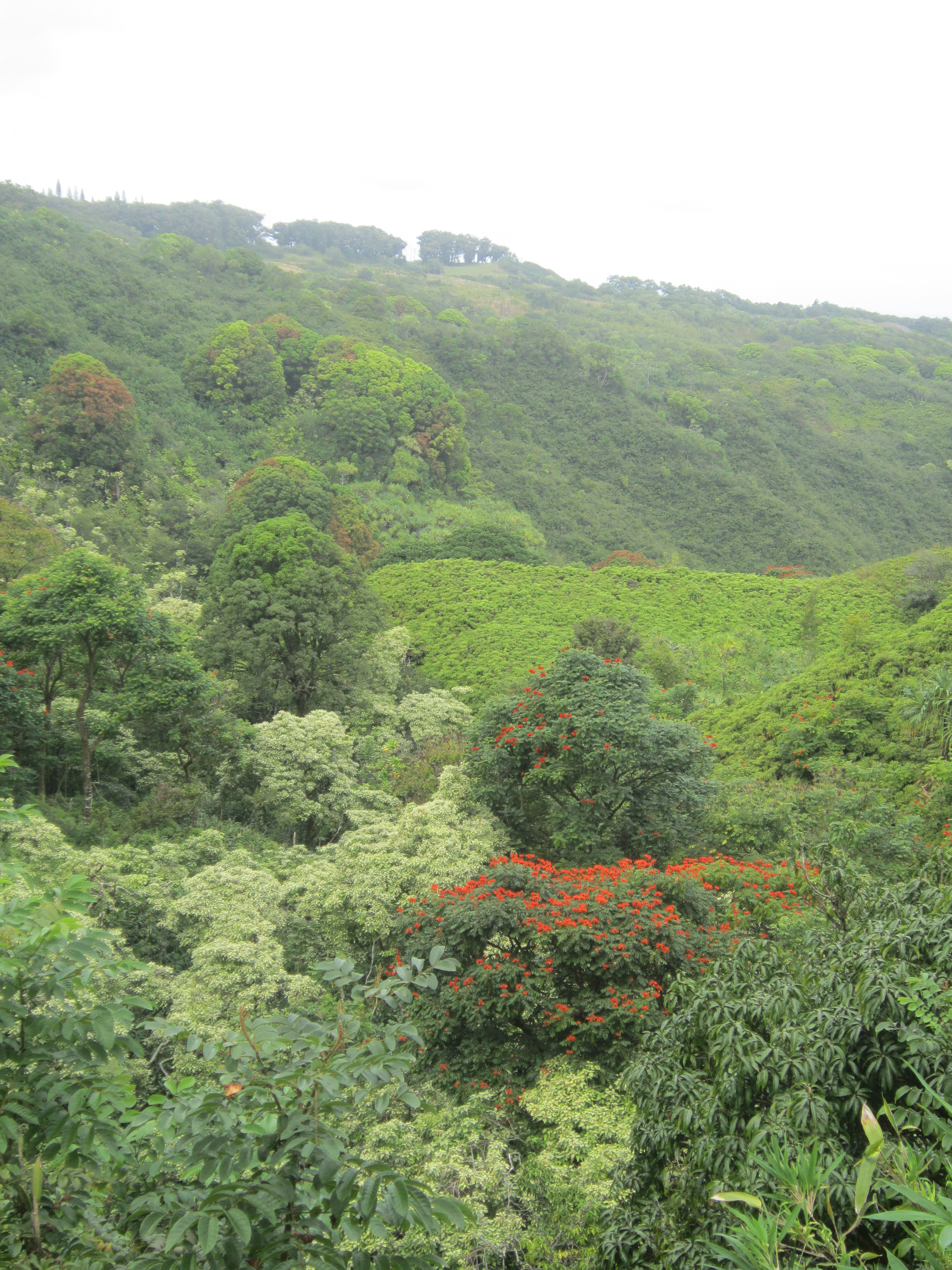
The song also reflects Harrison's appreciation of the lush tropical vegetation of Maui.

Seven naked native girls swam seven sacred pools
Lone-ranger smoking doobies said you're breaking all the rules
You'd better get your clothes on or else there'll be a row
If it wasn't for my sunstroke I would take you on right now ...

In the final verse, the narrative changes as Harrison sings earnestly of his new, idyllic home, referring to Hana as "she". He pictures the town "beneath the crater, in the meadow" and surrounded by vegetation. Inglis likens Harrison's female personification of Hana amid "fruit and grain" to a literary device employed by English poet John Keats in his "Ode to Autumn". He cites this similarity when concluding that "comparisons between the Beatles and the young Romantic poets of the early nineteenth century (Percy Shelley, Lord Byron, and Keats, among others) may legitimately extend to their creative use of language, as well as their public fascination."

== Recording ==
Harrison recorded "Soft-Hearted Hana" at his home studio, FPSHOT, in Oxfordshire during sessions held between April and October 1978. The recording coincided with a period of tranquility in his life as he and Arias awaited the birth of their first child. Rather than with Templeman, Harrison produced the album with Russ Titelman, another Warner Bros. staff producer. Titelman's previous projects included Ry Cooder's Chicken Skin Music, a 1976 album that reflected Cooder's adoption of Hawaiian musical influences. The musicians accompanying Harrison on the song were keyboard player Neil Larsen and the rhythm section of Willie Weeks (bass) and Andy Newmark (drums). The horns for this and other songs on the album were arranged by Del Newman and recorded at AIR Studios in London.

As on "Deep Blue" in 1971, the lead instrument on "Soft-Hearted Hana" is a dobro, played by Harrison. Authors Chip Madinger and Mark Easter consider the song's arrangement to be in the music hall tradition, aside from the inclusion of the dobro. The piano part was performed by Larsen in the style of ragtime pianist Jelly Roll Morton. (Note: In Leng's opinion, the song's "barroom piano … just cries out for a smiling Jelly Roll Morton".) Newman's horn arrangement included a prominent tuba part, while chorus vocals on the "I'm still smiling" middle-eights were sung by Harrison and Steve Winwood. The singalong mood of the track was furthered by the inclusion of spoken voices and background sounds, evoking a party scene. These parts were recorded at Harrison's local pub in Henley-on-Thames, the Row Barge. (Note: Harrison had given a rare, informal performance on guitar at the Row Barge in December 1977.) At the end of the song, the recording was subjected to heavy varispeeding, creating dramatic changes in pitch during the fade-out.

== Release and reception ==
George Harrison was released on Dark Horse Records on 20 February 1979. "Soft-Hearted Hana" was sequenced as the fourth track, between "Here Comes the Moon" and the album's lead single, "Blow Away". In North America, "Soft-Hearted Hana" was issued as the B-side of "Blow Away", which was released on 16 February. In Britain, it appeared as the B-side of the follow-up single, "Love Comes to Everyone", which was originally scheduled as the lead single there. That same year, Harrison furthered his ties to Hawaii when he bought Kuppu Qulua, a property in Nahiku, near Hana. In the album credits, he dedicated "Soft-Hearted Hana" to Bob Longhi, who owned Longhi's restaurant in Lahaina, on the opposite side of Maui from Hana.

Harrison did minimal promotion for the album, content to let the music make its mark as he focused on establishing HandMade Films to finance Monty Python's Life of Brian and other Python-related film projects. The album received favourable reviews from music critics. In Rolling Stone, Stephen Holden wrote: "George Harrison is refreshingly lighthearted ... The arrangements are the most concise and springy to be found on any Harrison record. 'Not Guilty,' 'Here Comes the Moon' and 'Soft-Hearted Hana' transport us back into psychedelic lotus land, but their tone is so airy and whimsical that the nostalgia is as seductive as it is anachronistic." Writing in Melody Maker, E.J. Thribb also welcomed the release, saying that "light-heartedness seems to infiltrate the music on this album, almost to the point of light-headedness", and he added of "Soft-Hearted Hana": "Eric Clapton first played me this a while back, and chuckled gently over the curious wobble speeds employed in the final chorus ... If you're not ready for it, you could fear your turntable has developed Parkinson's Disease."

Harry George of the NME credited Harrison's happiness with Olivia as the impetus for an album that was "a revelation compared to its predecessors" and he praised Harrison's guitar playing, saying: "'Soft-Hearted Hana' finds our hero out of his box at a party, McCartneyesque backing vocals and bucolic bottleneck showing a lightness of touch not seen in years. Ideal for poolside or fireside." Writing in 1981, NME critic Bob Woffinden rated the production, musicianship and musical arrangements throughout the album as the equal of the Beatles' work and said that the song "showed a facility [in Harrison] for switching style and mood that, again, rendered comparisons with the Beatles not at all invidious".

== Retrospective assessment and legacy ==
Filled with schoolboy humor and gags, "Soft-Hearted Hana" rivals Cheech and Chong at their peak for multiple drug allusions. The reference to swimming in the midst of a "Richard III" shows the millionaire had not lost touch with the toilet humor on which the British Empire was built.

– Harrison biographer Simon Leng, 2006

In his retrospective review for AllMusic, Richard Ginell was unimpressed by the album but he recognised "Soft-Hearted Hana" as one of the rare "quirks" among a mostly bland collection of songs and "a strange, stream-of-consciousness Hawaiian hallucination". Writing for Rough Guides, Chris Ingham said that George Harrison was worth the two-year wait and, just as "Blow Away" "perfectly conveys the breezy change of mood" Harrison had undergone, "Soft-Hearted Hana" "jazzily details his experience with magic mushrooms".

Among Harrison and Beatles biographers, Simon Leng views the song as the first instalment of the "Pythonization of Harrison's music", the "culmination" of which came with the 1981 track "Save the World". Chip Madinger and Mark Easter recognise the song as an early indication of Harrison's fondness for popular music from the pre-rock and roll era. They remark on its significance as an original composition, rather than an updated cover in the manner of Harrison's version of the Cole Porter standard "True Love", which Harrison released on his 1976 album Thirty Three & 1/3. Harrison subsequently indulged his love of 1930s jazz, specifically Cab Calloway, in two of the songs he wrote for the soundtrack of the 1986 HandMade comedy Shanghai Surprise: "Hottest Gong in Town", which again features a Morton-style piano part, and "Zig Zag". (Note: Harrison also included covers of two songs by Hoagy Carmichael, another of his earliest influences, along with singer and ukulele player George Formby, on his 1981 album Somewhere in England. In addition, he produced a recording of the wartime ballad "You Belong to Me" for Ringo Starr's album from the same year, Stop and Smell the Roses.) Robert Rodriguez says that "Soft-Hearted Hana" is one of the "standout tunes" on an album that ranks among the best Beatle solo releases of the 1970–1980 period. While he credits Titelman with reining in Harrison's "increasingly idiosyncratic" tendencies at a time when his music had little in common with contemporary rock and pop trends, Rodriguez expresses surprise that Harrison did not play ukulele on the track, given his attachment to the instrument and to Hawaii.

== Personnel ==
According to Simon Leng:

- George Harrison – vocals, acoustic guitar, dobro, backing vocals
- Neil Larsen – piano
- Willie Weeks – bass
- Andy Newmark – drums
- Del Newman – horn arrangement
- Steve Winwood – backing vocals

== Sources ==
- Keith Badman, The Beatles Diary Volume 2: After the Break-Up 1970–2001, Omnibus Press (London, 2001; ISBN 0-7119-8307-0).
- Alan Clayson, George Harrison, Sanctuary (London, 2003; ISBN 1-86074-489-3).
- George Harrison, I Me Mine, Chronicle Books (San Francisco, CA, 2002 [1980]; ISBN 0-8118-3793-9).
- Bill Harry, The George Harrison Encyclopedia, Virgin Books (London, 2003; ISBN 978-0753508220).
- Elliot J. Huntley, Mystical One: George Harrison – After the Break-up of the Beatles, Guernica Editions (Toronto, ON, 2006; ISBN 1-55071-197-0).
- Chris Ingham, The Rough Guide to the Beatles (2nd edn), Rough Guides/Penguin (London, 2006; ISBN 978-1-84836-525-4).
- Ian Inglis, The Words and Music of George Harrison, Praeger (Santa Barbara, CA, 2010; ISBN 978-0-313-37532-3).
- Ashley Kahn (ed.), George Harrison on George Harrison: Interviews and Encounters, Chicago Review Press (Chicago, IL, 2020; ISBN 978-1-64160-051-4).
- Simon Leng, While My Guitar Gently Weeps: The Music of George Harrison, Hal Leonard (Milwaukee, WI, 2006; ISBN 1-4234-0609-5).
- Chip Madinger & Mark Easter, Eight Arms to Hold You: The Solo Beatles Compendium, 44.1 Productions (Chesterfield, MO, 2000; ISBN 0-615-11724-4).
- Robert Rodriguez, Fab Four FAQ 2.0: The Beatles' Solo Years, 1970–1980, Backbeat Books (Milwaukee, WI, 2010; ISBN 978-1-4165-9093-4).
- Mat Snow, The Beatles Solo: The Illustrated Chronicles of John, Paul, George, and Ringo After the Beatles (Volume 3: George), Race Point Publishing (New York, NY, 2013; ISBN 978-1-937994-26-6).
- Gary Tillery, Working Class Mystic: A Spiritual Biography of George Harrison, Quest Books (Wheaton, IL, 2011; ISBN 978-0-8356-0900-5).
- Bob Woffinden, The Beatles Apart, Proteus (London, 1981; ISBN 0-906071-89-5).
