= Here Comes the Moon =

Song by George Harrison

from the album George Harrison
- Released: 20 February 1979
- Genre: Folk pop, psychedelia
- Length: 4:48
- Label: Dark Horse
- Songwriter: George Harrison
- Producers: George Harrison, Russ Titelman

George Harrison track listing
- 10 tracks Side one: 1. "Love Comes to Everyone"; 2. "Not Guilty"; 3. "Here Comes the Moon"; 4. "Soft-Hearted Hana"; 5. "Blow Away"; Side two: 6. "Faster"; 7. "Dark Sweet Lady"; 8. "Your Love Is Forever"; 9. "Soft Touch"; 10. "If You Believe"

"Here Comes the Moon" is a song by English rock musician George Harrison from his 1979 album George Harrison. Harrison wrote the song while on holiday on the Hawaiian island of Maui in February 1978. His inspiration for the composition was the appearance of the moon in the evening sky, just as the sun was setting. Although the lyrics focus on this natural occurrence rather than on the symbolism it suggests, in the manner of Harrison's Beatles track "Here Comes the Sun", the song is seen as a sequel to that similarly titled piece.

Harrison recorded "Here Comes the Moon" at his home studio, FPSHOT, in Oxfordshire. Reflecting the circumstances of the song's creation, the recording features a lush musical arrangement that includes acoustic and slide guitars, layered harmony vocals, orchestral strings, and sitar drone. An edited version of the track appeared on his 1989 compilation Best of Dark Horse. Harrison's solo demo of the song was included as a bonus track on the 2004 reissue of George Harrison.

== Background and inspiration ==
The sun was setting over the ocean, and it gets pretty stunning [in Maui] even when you're not on mushrooms. I was blissed out, and then I turned 'round and saw a big, full moon rising. I laughed and thought it was about time someone, and it may as well be me, gave the moon its due.

— George Harrison, 1987

George Harrison wrote "Here Comes the Moon" while in Hana on the Hawaiian island of Maui in February 1978. The purpose of the visit was partly to write material for his first album in two years, titled simply George Harrison, and partly for Harrison and his girlfriend (later wife), Olivia Arias, to enjoy a holiday after learning that they were to become parents for the first time. As with several of the songs on the album, Harrison drew inspiration for "Here Comes the Moon" from his surroundings on Maui. In his 1980 autobiography, I Me Mine, he recalls seeing "marvellous" sunsets there and regularly sighting whales. On this particular occasion, Harrison adds, "the full moon was coming up as the sun was going down – all this and here comes the moon! Too much." His experience was heightened by the effects of either LSD or magic mushrooms, the last of which provided inspiration for another new song, "Soft-Hearted Hana".

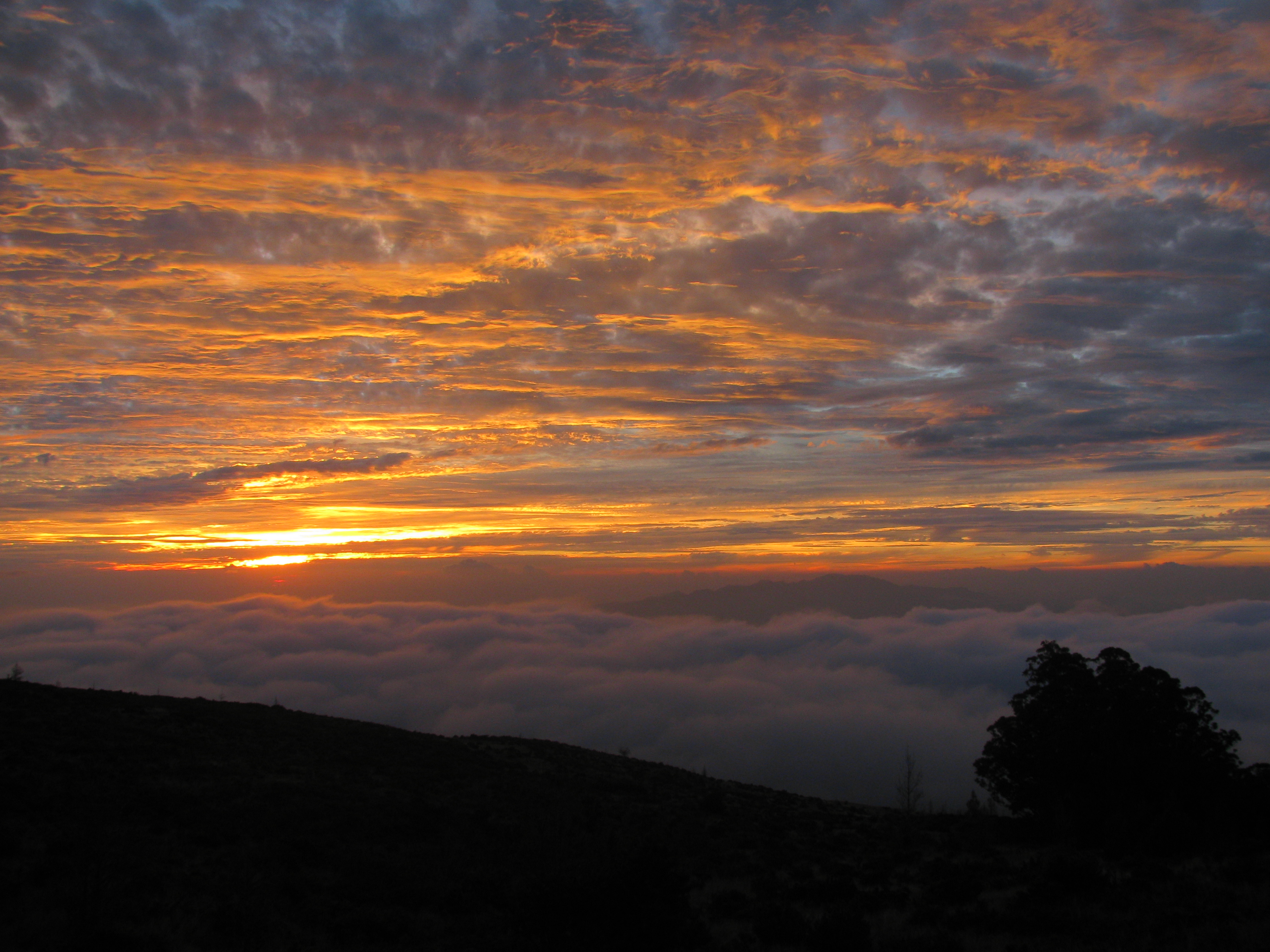
Sunset on Maui

Harrison's handwritten lyrics for "Here Comes the Moon" are dated 25 February, the day of his 35th birthday. The song's focus on nature furthered a common theme in his work, including the recently written "Blow Away", and dating back to his 1969 Beatles composition "Here Comes the Sun" and "All Things Must Pass", the title track of his 1970 solo album. According to singer Stevie Nicks, she spent time with Harrison in Hana during this period and helped him write the lyrics.

Due to the similarity of their titles, "Here Comes the Moon" has invited interpretation as a deliberate sequel to "Here Comes the Sun". It followed "This Guitar (Can't Keep from Crying)", Harrison's 1975 sequel to "While My Guitar Gently Weeps", which the Beatles included on their self-titled 1968 double album (also known as the "White Album"). In a February 1979 interview, Harrison said he had expected scrutiny over the song. He added that other songwriters had had "ten years to write 'Here Comes the Moon' after 'Here Comes the Sun', but nobody else wrote it, [so] I might as well do it meself".

== Composition ==
As with all the songs on George Harrison, music journalist John Metzger considers "Here Comes the Moon" to be in the folk pop style. The composition includes a series of descending guitar arpeggios before the start of each verse. The time signature is 6/8 over these guitar passages and the similarly descending choruses, and 4/4 over the verses and the middle eight.

In his lyrics, Harrison conveys a state of wonder at the natural world. He celebrates the arrival of the moon and rues that many people ignore its presence. He describes it as both "a little brother to the sun" and "mother to the stars at night", and comments on the heightened impulse it stimulates throughout the natural world during the full moon phase. In the middle eight, he terms the moon's arrival "God's gift", in that it mirrors light to the world. According to Harrison biographer Simon Leng, the song presents a "mystical never-never land of natural purity" that recalls the message and imagery first conveyed by Harrison in his 1970 composition "Ballad of Sir Frankie Crisp (Let It Roll)".

With regard to interpretations of "Here Comes the Moon" as a sequel song, author Ian Inglis writes that it differs significantly from "Here Comes the Sun". He says that whereas the latter adopts the arrival of sunshine as a metaphor for hope and an end to a dark emotional mood, "Here Comes the Moon" focuses purely on the moment itself, rather than what the moon's appearance might suggest. While also viewing the songs as having little in common aside from their titles, Harrison biographer Simon Leng considers that "Here Comes the Moon" shares the earlier composition's theme of escape.

== Recording ==
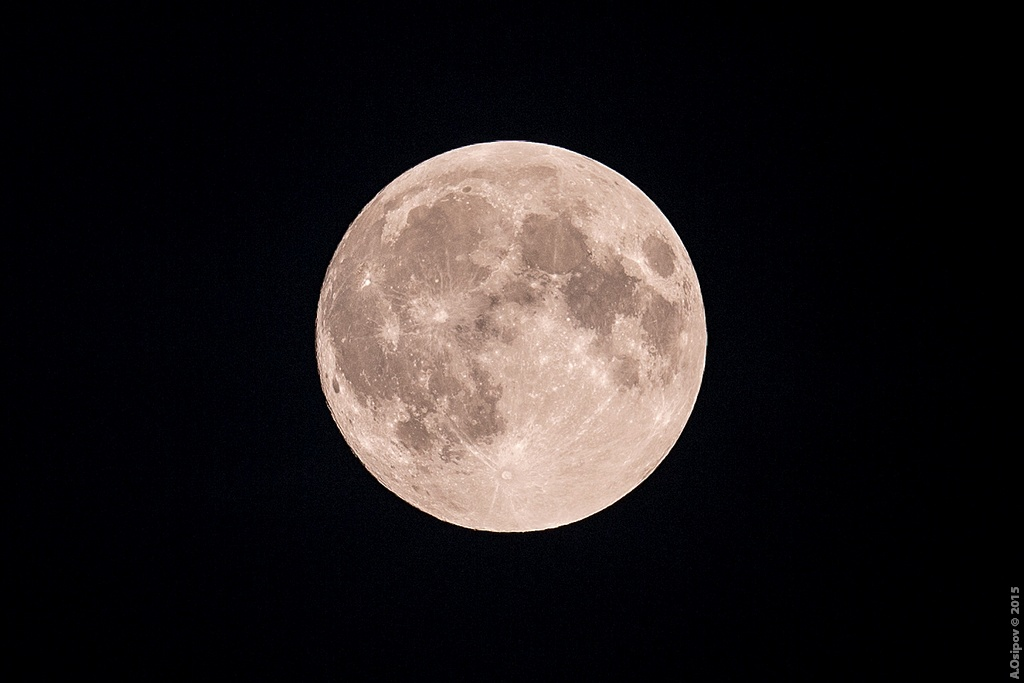
Harrison sought to convey the wonders of nature as represented by the full moon.

Harrison recorded "Here Comes the Moon" during sessions held between April and October 1978 at his FPSHOT studio in Henley-on-Thames, Oxfordshire. He produced the album with Russ Titelman, a Warner Bros. staff producer whose previous projects included Ry Cooder's Chicken Skin Music, a 1976 album that reflected Cooder's adoption of Hawaiian musical influences. Aside from Harrison, the musicians on the track were keyboard players Neil Larsen and Steve Winwood, percussionist Ray Cooper and the rhythm section of Willie Weeks (bass) and Andy Newmark (drums).

In the opinion of authors Chip Madinger and Mark Easter, the ethereal quality of "Here Comes the Moon" reflects its composer's "altered sensibilities" and the circumstances that inspired the song. Musicologist Thomas MacFarlane comments that although FPSHOT was still a 16-track recording facility, the clarity of sound on the album suggests a 24-track studio. He says that while the song's descending guitar riffs and mass of vocal harmonies singing the title phrase have a subtle Indian quality, the musical arrangement is closer to ambient music, with the verses especially "steeped in atmospheric effects". Typical of the mellow sound on George Harrison, Harrison played acoustic guitars on the track and overdubbed lead parts on slide guitar. Orchestral strings for this and other songs on the album were arranged by Del Newman and recorded at AIR Studios in London.

Aside from referencing the Beatles with "Here Comes the Moon", Harrison returned to two unreleased compositions from the White Album era during the sessions: "Not Guilty" and "Circles", although the latter was not included on George Harrison. (Note: Having met representatives from Genesis Publications in late 1977, Harrison had begun compiling his old song manuscripts for the book project that became I, Me, Mine.) Leng finds signs of Harrison's "Beatles heritage" throughout "Here Comes the Moon", which he describes as a return to "the psychedelic days of 1967". He cites the multi-layered backing vocals that Harrison and Winwood perform, particularly in the section where "the 'moon' sweeps across the soundscape, almost a cappella, invoking the majesty of 'Because'". Author Alan Clayson also comments on the song's 1960s references, including the vocalised "oh yeah"s and the subtle use of sitar drone.

Harrison discussed "Here Comes the Moon" on the BBC Radio 1 show Roundtable, when he appeared as a guest alongside Michael Jackson on 9 February 1979. Harrison said it was a track he enjoyed and that while mixing the recording, he would fall asleep because "by the time it gets to the end, it's put me in a dream world."

== Release ==
George Harrison was released on the artist's Dark Horse record label on 20 February 1979. "Here Comes the Moon" appeared as the third track on the album, sequenced between "Not Guilty" and "Soft-Hearted Hana". Harrison biographer Elliot Huntley writes that the album's commercial performance in the UK was limited by interest in the Beatles being "at an all-time low", due to the dominance of new wave music there, but George Harrison nevertheless "sounded exactly like an album an ex-Beatle should have been making in 1979". (Note: Huntley contrasts this with Back to the Egg by Paul McCartney's band Wings, which attempted to respond to new wave and was "critically massacred".) Later that year, Harrison furthered his ties to Hawaii when he bought Kuppu Qulua, a property in Nahiku, near Hana.

"Here Comes the Moon" was included on the 1989 compilation album Best of Dark Horse, the content of which partly reflected Harrison's personal preferences by omitting some of his hit singles in favour of album tracks. This release contained an edited version of the song, with the track length reduced to 4:07.

When Harrison's Dark Horse albums were remastered for his posthumous Dark Horse Years reissue campaign in 2004, an acoustic demo of "Here Comes the Moon" appeared as the sole bonus track on the George Harrison CD. This selection was again at Harrison's request, since he had chosen the bonus tracks for the reissues before his death in November 2001. The expanded CD booklet included a photo of Harrison writing the song on acoustic guitar. In his liner-note essay in the Dark Horse Years box set, music critic David Fricke cited "Here Comes the Moon" as his personal best rediscovery among Harrison's long-unavailable Dark Horse catalogue, describing it as a "gorgeous sequel" to "Here Comes the Sun" "with milky-waterfall harmonies in the chorus line".

== Critical reception ==
Among contemporary reviews of George Harrison, Billboard described "Here Comes the Moon" as a song "inspired by the sublime atmosphere" of Hawaii and ranked it as the second of the album's "best cuts", after "Love Comes to Everyone". In Rolling Stone, Stephen Holden admired Harrison and Titelman for creating the artist's leanest and most buoyant musical arrangements yet. While recognising the album's avoidance of contemporary pop styles, he grouped the song with "Not Guilty" and "Soft-Hearted Hana" as tracks that "transport us back into psychedelic lotus land, but their tone is so airy and whimsical that the nostalgia is as seductive as it is anachronistic". (Note: Harry George of the NME similarly approved of the album's 1960s elements, writing that "Crafty harmonies (Winwood and Harrison) and skilfully-layered guitars recall the sun-soaked vistas of 'Because' and 'Sun King' on Abbey Road.")

Writing in Melody Maker, E.J. Thribb said it was an album that "grows in its effect after a few plays" and concluded that with this and other songs, Harrison had "brought both sunshine and moonshine into our lives". Some critics disapproved of his apparent reworking of a popular Beatles song, however. Steve Simels of Stereo Review complained that Harrison was "still doing cut-and-paste games with his Beatles stuff" and said that the "recycling" of "Here Comes the Sun" "should tell you all you need to know about the declining state of George's creative powers".

It just happened to be one of those evenings where the full moon was rising and it was over a beautiful bay. He was sort of reluctantly going, "Oh no, look, here comes the moon, they'll kill me if I write that", because of "Here Comes the Sun," of course. But it was pretty irresistible and I think it's a really rich beautiful song.

— Olivia Harrison (née Arias), at the launch of I Me Mine – The Extended Edition in April 2017

Greg Kot's assessment for Rolling Stone in 2002 read in part: "'Here Comes the Moon' is a dreamy little wonder, the kind of incantation that underscores the [album's] romantic subtlety …" Among reviews of the 2004 reissue, PopMatters' Jason Korenkiewicz recognised "Here Comes the Moon" as one of the standout tracks, describing it as a "dreamy psychedelic sing-a-long" on an album that reflected Harrison's "new found sense of calm and peace", while Parke Puterbaugh of Rolling Stone said it was one of the "memorably lilting tunes" that made George Harrison the artist's "midcareer peak". Conversely, Richard Ginell of AllMusic deems George Harrison to be "an ordinary album from an extraordinary talent", and he dismisses the track as "a lazy retake" on "Here Comes the Sun".

Former Mojo editor Mat Snow includes "Here Comes the Moon" among the album's best tracks, which he describes as "romantic and reflective" and, thanks largely to Titelman's involvement, "tastefully contemporary". Writing on his website Elsewhere, New Zealand Herald critic Graham Reid considers the song to be a "lovely" track, yet also, in its drawing on a similar theme to "Here Comes the Sun", a sign that Harrison's inspiration was waning. Beatles biographer Robert Rodriguez states that, as with "This Guitar (Can't Keep from Crying)" and "While My Guitar Gently Weeps", such comparisons are unfounded and reflective of music critics' overly reverential approach to the Beatles' work. Rodriguez adds: "Even had the earlier song never been written, 'Moon' would still stand as a lovely, lyrical evocation of the lunar orb and the emotion it stirs."

== Personnel ==
According to Simon Leng:

- George Harrison – vocals, acoustic guitars, slide guitars, sitar, backing vocals
- Neil Larsen – electric piano
- Steve Winwood – harmonium, backing vocals
- Willie Weeks – bass
- Andy Newmark – drums
- Ray Cooper – percussion
- Del Newman – string arrangement

== Sources ==
- Dale C. Allison Jr, The Love There That's Sleeping: The Art and Spirituality of George Harrison, Continuum (New York, NY, 2006; ISBN 978-0-8264-1917-0).
- Keith Badman, The Beatles Diary Volume 2: After the Break-Up 1970–2001, Omnibus Press (London, 2001; ISBN 0-7119-8307-0).
- Alan Clayson, George Harrison, Sanctuary (London, 2003; ISBN 1-86074-489-3).
- Peter Doggett, You Never Give Me Your Money: The Beatles After the Breakup, It Books (New York, NY, 2011; ISBN 978-0-06-177418-8).
- The Editors of Rolling Stone, Harrison, Rolling Stone Press/Simon & Schuster (New York, NY, 2002; ISBN 0-7432-3581-9).
- George Harrison, I Me Mine, Chronicle Books (San Francisco, CA, 2002 [1980]; ISBN 0-8118-3793-9).
- Bill Harry, The George Harrison Encyclopedia, Virgin Books (London, 2003; ISBN 978-0753508220).
- Elliot J. Huntley, Mystical One: George Harrison – After the Break-up of the Beatles, Guernica Editions (Toronto, ON, 2006; ISBN 1-55071-197-0).
- Ian Inglis, The Words and Music of George Harrison, Praeger (Santa Barbara, CA, 2010; ISBN 978-0-313-37532-3).
- Ashley Kahn (ed.), George Harrison on George Harrison: Interviews and Encounters, Chicago Review Press (Chicago, IL, 2020; ISBN 978-1-64160-051-4).
- Simon Leng, While My Guitar Gently Weeps: The Music of George Harrison, Hal Leonard (Milwaukee, WI, 2006; ISBN 1-4234-0609-5).
- Thomas MacFarlane, The Music of George Harrison, Routledge (Abingdon, UK, 2019; ISBN 978-1-138-59910-9).
- Chip Madinger & Mark Easter, Eight Arms to Hold You: The Solo Beatles Compendium, 44.1 Productions (Chesterfield, MO, 2000; ISBN 0-615-11724-4).
- Robert Rodriguez, Fab Four FAQ 2.0: The Beatles' Solo Years, 1970–1980, Backbeat Books (Milwaukee, WI, 2010; ISBN 978-1-4165-9093-4).
- Mat Snow, The Beatles Solo: The Illustrated Chronicles of John, Paul, George, and Ringo After The Beatles (Volume 3: George), Race Point Publishing (New York, NY, 2013; ISBN 978-1-937994-26-6).
- Gary Tillery, Working Class Mystic: A Spiritual Biography of George Harrison, Quest Books (Wheaton, IL, 2011; ISBN 978-0-8356-0900-5).
