= Love Comes to Everyone =

Single by George Harrison

from the album George Harrison
- B-side: "Soft-Hearted Hana" (UK); "Soft Touch" (US)
- Released: 20 April 1979 (UK); 11 May 1979 (US)
- Recorded: 1978
- Genre: Pop rock, R&B
- Length: 4:36 (album version); 3:35 (single edit)
- Label: Dark Horse
- Songwriter(s): George Harrison
- Producer(s): George Harrison, Russ Titelman

George Harrison singles chronology
"Blow Away" (1979)	"Love Comes to Everyone" (1979)	"Faster" (1979)

George Harrison track listing
- 10 tracks Side one: 1. "Love Comes to Everyone"; 2. "Not Guilty"; 3. "Here Comes the Moon"; 4. "Soft-Hearted Hana"; 5. "Blow Away"; Side two: 6. "Faster"; 7. "Dark Sweet Lady"; 8. "Your Love Is Forever"; 9. "Soft Touch"; 10. "If You Believe"

"Love Comes to Everyone" is a song by English rock musician George Harrison from his 1979 album George Harrison. It is the opening track on the album and was also issued as the second single, after "Blow Away". The song reflects Harrison's contentment in his personal life as he was soon to become a father for the first time and married his second wife, Olivia Arias. Despite its commercial qualities, and contrary to some reviewers' predictions at the time of release, the song failed to become a hit.

The lyrics to the song refer to human love and spiritual love as one, furthering a characteristic of Harrison's songwriting. He recorded the track at his Friar Park home studio in England in 1978 following a year away from the music industry. The recording includes synthesizer solos played by Steve Winwood and a guitar contribution from Eric Clapton over the intro to the track. Clapton's presence on the song formally signalled the continuation of his and Harrison's musical friendship after the potential complications presented by Clapton having eloped with Pattie Boyd, Harrison's first wife, in 1974.

Harrison included "Love Comes to Everyone" on his Dark Horse Records compilation Best of Dark Horse 1976–1989. Clapton covered the song on his 2005 album Back Home as a tribute to Harrison, four years after his death.

== Background ==
George Harrison began writing "Love Comes to Everyone" in September 1977 and finished it in Hawaii in February 1978. Its writing and recording coincided with a period of domestic contentment for Harrison, who married his second wife, Olivia Arias, and saw the birth of his only child, son Dhani, during the sessions for his self-titled album. In his autobiography, I, Me, Mine, he describes the message of the song as "very optimistic". He also says the melody came about through using a Roland chorus effect on his guitar.

According to the date given in I, Me, Mine, "Love Comes to Everyone" was the first new song Harrison wrote for the George Harrison album. He approached the project after taking a sabbatical for much of 1977, during which he and Arias travelled and attended races in the Formula 1 World Championship. In June that year, Harrison and his first wife, Pattie Boyd, divorced amicably, and he continued to maintain a close friendship with Boyd's partner, Eric Clapton, whom Harrison took to calling his "husband-in-law" and "guitarist-in-law". He later attributed the relaxed mood of the album to "everything ... happening nice for me" in the two years since Thirty Three & ⅓, adding, "I'm happy, and I think that it's reflected in the music."

== Composition ==
Music critic David Fricke describes the mood of "Love Comes to Everyone" as "church-bell strum and beatific stroll". Author Simon Leng likens the song's harmony to that in "Far East Man", a 1974 composition in the soul style that Harrison wrote with Faces guitarist Ron Wood.

The lyrics continue a theme typical of Harrison's songwriting since his 1968 Beatles track "Long, Long, Long", whereby human love and spiritual or divine love are inseparable concepts. He states the song's message with an ambiguity that initially suggests it is focused on human love and romance. (Note: In interviews to promote Thirty Three & ⅓, Harrison said he had consciously written songs directed to both "the Lord" and a person, and that "all love is part of a universal love. When you love a woman, it's the God in her that you see.") The lyrics encourage the listener that love is there for all to experience, and that it "only takes time" before "that door" opens. In the song's bridges, he sings of a love "here in your heart" that will not change or age, referring to the assuredness of divine love and the inward journey required to experience it.

While Harrison's songs often focus on the Hindu deity Krishna as his idea of God, "Love Comes to Everyone" includes imagery equally typical of Christian teaching. In the final verse, his line "Knock and it will open wide" recalls phrases from the New Testament books of Matthew and Luke.

== Recording ==
Harrison recorded "Love Comes to Everyone" at his home studio, FPSHOT, between April and October 1978. As with all of the George Harrison album, he co-produced the track with Russ Titelman. The project marked the first time that Harrison had fully shared the producer's role on one of his albums since working with Phil Spector in the early 1970s. (Note: Harrison later said that having taken a year off in 1977, he felt out of touch with pop music, whereas "Russ ... was in music day by day, [and] would give me a bit of direction.") According to author Robert Rodriguez, "Love Comes to Everyone" is the one track on George Harrison that appeared to follow contemporary music trends. He says it incorporates a "danceable tom-tom" beat.

The Roland guitar effect on the song was also used on "Your Love Is Forever", adding a phased, ambient quality to the recording. Leng describes Harrison's electric guitar parts on "Love Comes to Everyone" as eschewing the "screaming axes" approach of rock music and instead serving as "smooth, ringing purveyors of elegance". In a 1996 interview, Titelman recalled that while making the album he came to appreciate the precision and craft Harrison had applied to the Beatles' music, and the "unique" quality of his guitar styles and sounds. He recognised Harrison's "fluid approach" in the guitar parts on songs such "Love Comes to Everyone" as a legacy of his immersion in Indian music.

The other musicians on the recording include Steve Winwood (who plays the Minimoog synthesizer solos), Neil Larsen, Willie Weeks, Andy Newmark and Ray Cooper. Newmark recalled a far "mellower" Harrison, compared with his demeanour during the sessions for his Dark Horse album in 1974. After suffering the loss of his father, who died in May, Harrison and Arias's son was born in August and the couple married the following month. Harrison's contentment was especially relevant since he had long wanted to become a parent. (Note: During his marriage to Boyd, Harrison had told friends that fertility tests showed he was unable to father a child. With Dhani's birth, these friends realised that he had been protecting Boyd. In her 2007 autobiography, Wonderful Today, Boyd says she was upset that Harrison had not told her about his wedding. Her reaction inspired Clapton to write the song "Golden Ring".)

Author Ian Inglis says that Winwood's contributions on synthesizer and backing vocals give the track "an unusual depth". Clapton, Winwood's former bandmate in Blind Faith, played lead guitar over the intro to the track. It was Clapton's first appearance on a Harrison record since the Concert for Bangladesh live album in 1971, after which gossip columnists had been intrigued by Harrison divulging details of the romantic triangle between himself, Clapton and Boyd in his Dark Horse track "Bye Bye, Love". (Note: Aside from singing about the couple in "Bye Bye, Love", Harrison made a laconic reference to Boyd and Clapton in his handwritten sleeve notes for the 1974 LP. Seeing this, a record company employee mistakenly listed Clapton as a contributor to the album.) Inglis views Clapton's participation in this and later Harrison projects as a sign of "the depth of their mutual affection" despite the potential awkwardness of their romantic entanglements. (Note: Clapton commented in a 1974 interview that if Harrison wanted them to play together in the future, "he's got the best that I can give, whenever I can give it." The popular media nevertheless assumed they remained adversaries over Boyd; Clapton later said he had thought the situation "tense" but Harrison's humour helped them all move forward.)

George Harrison was scheduled for release in December but an issue with the artwork delayed the process. On 7 December, Harrison made a rare live appearance when he joined Clapton on stage at Guildford Civic Hall to play the encore at the final show of Clapton's UK tour.

== Release ==
George Harrison was released on Dark Horse Records in February 1979, with "Love Comes to Everyone" sequenced as the opening track. It was Harrison's first album in over two years, during which, particularly in the UK, punk rock had established itself as the new phenomenon, predicated on a return to authentic rock 'n' roll values. In opening the album, according to Leng, "Love Comes to Everyone" served as a statement declaring Harrison's resistance to the punk-inspired aesthetic. He adds that such was the song's "deliberately ambiguous lyrical sheen", its religious references were equally hidden from a pop audience. (Note: In an interview to promote the album, Harrison said the spiritual message remained but was stated with more subtlety. He said that "Your Love Is Forever" conveyed the same message as "My Sweet Lord", but in a way that would be "less offensive" to some listeners.)

The song was originally intended as the album's lead single in the United Kingdom, and was Harrison's choice for the first single, but "Blow Away" was selected instead. "Love Comes to Everyone" was issued as the A-side of the album's second single on 20 April in the UK and on 11 May in the United States. In the UK, it was backed by "Soft-Hearted Hana", while the US B-side was "Soft Touch". (Note: The UK release was initially scheduled for 29 January. The eventual UK release retained the original Dark Horse catalogue number (meaning it sequentially precedes "Blow Away"'s) and the original choice of B-side, since "Soft-Hearted Hana" was also the first-choice B-side for the lead single in the US.) For the single, the track was given an early fade-out, reducing the running time to 3:35.

Cover of the US sheet music for the song, depicting Harrison and his son Dhani

Unlike for "Blow Away" and the UK charity single "Faster", Harrison did not produce a music video for "Love Comes to Everyone", and he did limited promotion for the album generally. Coinciding with the single's UK release, he gave an interview to Capital Radio, but the song failed to chart there. On 19 May, a week after the Capital Radio interview, Harrison and Arias attended Clapton and Boyd's wedding reception in Ewhurst, Surrey. The occasion marked the first time that three former Beatles had played live since the band's break-up, as Harrison, Paul McCartney and Ringo Starr were among the musicians who performed on the makeshift stage in Clapton's garden. The song placed at number 30 on the UK Airplay Top 50 chart compiled by the industry publication Radio & Record News, drawn from figures supplied by BBC Radio and JICRAR.

In the US, "Love Comes to Everyone" had been favoured by DJs as an album track while "Blow Away" received heavy airplay. Defying expectations that it too would become a commercial hit there, the single failed to chart on the Billboard Hot 100. (Note: The US trade ad for the record included a picture of Harrison with his son and text describing it as the artist's "much-in-demand new single".) Record World reported it at number 118, and the song reached number 38 on Billboard's Adult Contemporary chart. The prominent synthesizer sound on the recording later found greater commercial success as a feature of Winwood's 1980 album Arc of a Diver, particularly his 1981 hit single "While You See a Chance". Given a limited production run, the US picture sleeve for "Love Comes to Everyone" became highly prized among collectors. By 2000, it was the most valuable collectible among Harrison's record-related items. (Note: Writing in Goldmine magazine shortly after Harrison's death in November 2001, Chuck Miller reported that American collectors were paying up to $750 for a record with a "near-mint" original sleeve. By comparison, high-quality original picture sleeves for Harrison's biggest hit singles, such as "My Sweet Lord" and "What Is Life", were fetching around $40.)

Harrison included "Love Comes to Everyone" on his 1989 compilation album Best of Dark Horse 1976–1989. The track used there is around five seconds longer than the 1979 single edit. He performed the song on his Japanese tour with Clapton, in December 1991, but dropped it from the setlist after the opening night. As a tribute to Harrison, four years after his death, Clapton covered the song on his 2005 album Back Home. As with the other material on what he called his "'family' album", Clapton's choice was inspired by fatherhood and his contentment with Melia McEnery, whom he married in 2002.

== Critical reception ==
Writing in Melody Maker in 1979, E.J. Thribb named "Love Comes to Everyone" among the three most enjoyable songs on an album that reflected the singer's happy approach to life. Thribb grouped it with "Blow Away" and "Not Guilty", saying: "The chords roll and tumble, the melodies are good to chant, and the lyrics are simple but tell their story." Billboard's reviewer considered it to be the album's "best cut" and admired the track for Harrison's "vintage guitar strumming", Clapton's guitar intro and Winwood's backing vocals. In Rolling Stone, Stephen Holden found the album "refreshingly lighthearted" and evidence that Harrison "was always a much better tunesmith than priest", and he highlighted the "prettiness" of the song's melody.

In his review of the single for Record Mirror, Paul Sexton paired "Love Comes to Everyone" with "Blow Away" as a song that suggested Harrison had "sold out" but was nevertheless "a very proficient AOR record". Sexton added that he had always liked Harrison's voice and musical arrangements, but with "Blow Away" having soon disappeared from the UK chart, the former Beatle was becoming a "poor man's Paul McCartney" in terms of his songs' longevity. Cash Box predicted success for the single, describing it as a "soothingly melodic followup" to "Blow Away". The reviewer admired the blend of guitar motif, electric piano, tambourine and synthesizer soloing, along with Harrison's "top notch" vocals and "inspirational message".

Writing in 1981, Bob Woffinden of the NME described the track as "joyous" and an example of how, thanks to its creator's happiness as a husband and father, George Harrison was "characterised by many of the positive qualities (consistency, professionalism, confidence, ebullience)" that had distinguished the Beatles' work throughout the 1960s. NME critics Roy Carr and Tony Tyler referred to "Love Comes to Everyone" as a "poised and relaxedly melodic all purpose choon". They commented that Harrison incorporates a composing trick first heard on his 1965 song "If I Needed Someone", that of "basing his phrases on the off-beats of a two-bar sequence", a device they deemed one of Harrison's "best loved and least worn out".

Among more recent assessments, AllMusic critic Richard Ginell dismisses the song as a "depressing" choice to open the album, and "a treadmill tune with greeting-card verses". Morgan Enos of Billboard recognises it as one of the three "gems" on George Harrison that showed the artist to be "happier than he'd been in years".

Pop historian Robert Rodriguez calls "Love Comes to Everyone" a "melodic, gentle slice of commercial pop, managing to sound at once contemporary and idiosyncratically Harrison". He says that the song deserved to become a hit and describes the single's lack of commercial success as "baffling". Harrison biographer Elliot Huntley deems the song a "glorious piece", despite Clapton's "mediocre" guitar intro and the "paper and comb" synthesizer sound, and he considers that its failure to become a hit was "mystifying ... given that it seemed perfect for AOR radio stations the world over".

== Personnel ==
According to author Simon Leng, the line-up of musicians on Harrison's recording is as follows:

- George Harrison – lead and backing vocals, electric guitars
- Eric Clapton – guitar intro
- Neil Larsen – electric piano, organ
- Steve Winwood – Minimoog, backing vocals
- Willie Weeks – bass
- Andy Newmark – drums
- Ray Cooper – percussion

== Cover versions ==
In 1983, Brazilian singer Zizi Possi released a Portuguese cover version of this song, named O Amor Vem Pra Cada Um on the long play record Pra Sempre E Mais Um Dia.

== Sources ==
- Allison, Dale C. Jr (2006). The Love There That's Sleeping: The Art and Spirituality of George Harrison. New York, NY: Continuum. ISBN 978-0-8264-1917-0.
- Badman, Keith (2001). The Beatles Diary Volume 2: After the Break-Up 1970–2001. London: Omnibus Press. ISBN 978-0-7119-8307-6.
- Boyd, Pattie; with Junor, Penny (2007). Wonderful Today: The Autobiography. London: Headline Review. ISBN 978-0-7553-1646-5.
- Carr, Roy; Tyler, Tony (1981). The Beatles: An Illustrated Record. New York, NY: Harmony Books. ISBN 0-517-54493-8.
- Clapton, Eric (2007). Eric Clapton: The Autobiography. London: Century. ISBN 978-1-84605-309-2.
- Clayson, Alan (2003). George Harrison. London: Sanctuary. ISBN 1-86074-489-3.
- The Editors of Rolling Stone (2002). Harrison. New York, NY: Rolling Stone Press. ISBN 978-0-7432-3581-5.
- Greene, Joshua M. (2006). Here Comes the Sun: The Spiritual and Musical Journey of George Harrison. Hoboken, NJ: John Wiley & Sons. ISBN 978-0-470-12780-3.
- Harrison, George (2002) [1980]. I, Me, Mine. San Francisco, CA: Chronicle Books. ISBN 978-0-8118-5900-4.
- Harry, Bill (2003). The George Harrison Encyclopedia. London: Virgin Books. ISBN 978-0-7535-0822-0.
- Huntley, Elliot J. (2006). Mystical One: George Harrison – After the Break-up of the Beatles. Toronto, ON: Guernica Editions. ISBN 978-1-55071-197-4.
- Inglis, Ian (2010). The Words and Music of George Harrison. Santa Barbara, CA: Praeger. ISBN 978-0-313-37532-3.
- Kahn, Ashley (2020). George Harrison on George Harrison: Interviews and Encounters. Chicago, IL: Chicago Review Press. ISBN 978-1-64160-051-4.
- Leng, Simon (2006). While My Guitar Gently Weeps: The Music of George Harrison. Milwaukee, WI: Hal Leonard. ISBN 978-1-4234-0609-9.
- MacFarlane, Thomas (2019). The Music of George Harrison. Abingdon, UK: Routledge. ISBN 978-1-138-59910-9.
- Madinger, Chip; Easter, Mark (2000). Eight Arms to Hold You: The Solo Beatles Compendium. Chesterfield, MO: 44.1 Productions. ISBN 0-615-11724-4.
- Rodriguez, Robert (2010). Fab Four FAQ 2.0: The Beatles' Solo Years, 1970–1980. Milwaukee, WI: Backbeat Books. ISBN 978-1-4165-9093-4.
- Snow, Mat (2013). The Beatles Solo: The Illustrated Chronicles of John, Paul, George, and Ringo After the Beatles (Volume 3: George). New York, NY: Race Point Publishing. ISBN 978-1-937994-26-6.
- Tillery, Gary (2011). Working Class Mystic: A Spiritual Biography of George Harrison. Wheaton, IL: Quest Books. ISBN 978-0-8356-0900-5.
- Woffinden, Bob (1981). The Beatles Apart. London: Proteus. ISBN 0-906071-89-5.
- Womack, Kenneth (2014). The Beatles Encyclopedia: Everything Fab Four. Santa Barbara, CA: ABC-CLIO. ISBN 978-0-313-39171-2.
