= If You Believe (George Harrison song) =

Song by George Harrison

from the album George Harrison
- Released: 20 February 1979
- Genre: Pop-rock
- Length: 2:55
- Label: Dark Horse
- Songwriters: George Harrison, Gary Wright
- Producers: George Harrison, Russ Titelman

George Harrison track listing
- 10 tracks Side one: 1. "Love Comes to Everyone"; 2. "Not Guilty"; 3. "Here Comes the Moon"; 4. "Soft-Hearted Hana"; 5. "Blow Away"; Side two: 6. "Faster"; 7. "Dark Sweet Lady"; 8. "Your Love Is Forever"; 9. "Soft Touch"; 10. "If You Believe"

"If You Believe" is a song by English musician George Harrison from his 1979 album George Harrison. Harrison began writing the song with Gary Wright on New Year's Day 1978 and finished the lyrics a month later while in Hawaii. The song appears as the final track on George Harrison. Its lyrics are a statement on the power of faith to bring about a desired outcome.

Harrison recorded "If You Believe" in 1978 at his home studio, FPSHOT, in Oxfordshire. The track includes a synthesizer contribution from Wright and was co-produced by Harrison and Russ Titelman. The musical arrangement also features multiple acoustic guitars, a heavy drum sound and orchestral strings, and so recalls Harrison's early 1970s recordings with Phil Spector. The song was considered for release as a single after "Love Comes to Everyone" but the release did not take place.

== Background ==
He said "Here's a bit I've got, I don't know if you can make anything of it!" He played it to me and we made it into this song that night.

– George Harrison, 1979, recalling how he and Gary Wright wrote "If You Believe"

After completing promotion for his first album on his Dark Horse record label, Thirty Three & 1/3, in February 1977, George Harrison spent the remainder of the year following the Formula 1 world championship itinerary and having little involvement with the music industry. He later described this as "skiving [off]" after a period of difficulty regarding Dark Horse's distribution, which changed from A&M Records to Warner Bros. in November 1976, and problems he had encountered since 1975 with some of the artists signed to the label. Having returned to songwriting late in 1977, refreshed from the recent diversion, Harrison began writing "If You Believe" with his friend Gary Wright on New Year's Day 1978. The writing session took place at Friar Park, Harrison's home in Henley, Oxfordshire.

The song was the first official collaboration between Harrison and Wright. (Note: Although, Wright has recalled that in 1971 Harrison helped him write "To Discover Yourself", a song that Wright revisited following Harrison's death in November 2001.) For Wright, the period from late 1977 was one of self-doubt due to the commercial failure of his album Touch and Gone, which continued the downward trend of his career following his long-sought-after breakthrough with The Dream Weaver over 1975–76. The song addresses the importance of self-belief and the knowledge that this quality is conducive to avoiding misfortune. In his 1980 autobiography, I, Me, Mine, Harrison recalls that the collaboration was initiated by Wright offering a segment, which the two of them then developed into a song. Harrison wrote the lyrics to the verses in Hawaii, where he holidayed with his wife, Olivia Arias, in February 1978, and enjoyed an intensive period of writing for his next album, George Harrison.

== Composition ==
"If You Believe" is a pop-rock song in 4/4 time and set to a heavy rock beat. The key throughout is C major. The structure of the composition is an instrumental passage followed by a verse and a chorus, followed by a second round of the same three sections, with repeated choruses to close the song. (Note: In I, Me, Mine, Harrison says he edited the song down after recording it. One of his early drafts reproduced in the book includes three verses rather than two.) The verses comprise two rounds of six-bar passages, with a chord pattern of C, C^{7}, F, Fm, G and G^{7}. The choruses use the first five of these chords but extend the phrasing on C and F and introduce a half-bar (over which the C7 chord is played), so that each of the two rounds lasts for six-and-a-half bars.

Author Simon Leng comments that the adoption of a three-word title recalls Harrison's early 1970s hits "My Sweet Lord" and "Give Me Love", and that, with "If You Believe", he and Wright add a "gospel-infused hook" to that formula. In the lyrics, Harrison espouses the idea that all things are possible and, in author Ian Inglis' description, that "The secret is simply to have faith and believe, in oneself and in others." In the first verse, he sings of the choice between "worry[ing] your life away" and embracing transcendence by "Wak[ing] up to the love that flows on around you".

Theologian Dale Allison views the song as an example of Harrison blending Christian and Hindu teachings. He cites the chorus' reference to belief in first "you" and then "me" (with the latter term referring to God) as an exhortation to recognise that "the kingdom of God is within", since "the listeners' belief in themselves ('you') is correlated with their belief in God ('me')." Allison views the line "Get up, you have all your needs – pray" as similarly reflecting a Hindu message, whereby the individual possesses "divine attributes" that can be realised. By contrast, he identifies the line "Everything you thought is possible if you believe" as a likely biblical quotation, from the New Testament gospels of Matthew, Mark and Luke.

== Recording ==
Recording for the George Harrison album began at Harrison's studio, FPSHOT, in April 1978, with Russ Titelman co-producing the sessions. As inspiration for his album in two years, Harrison made a point of listening to his 1970 triple album All Things Must Pass. Wright arrived in England in mid May on his return from a six-week holiday in India and took part in the recording of "If You Believe". His contribution included the horn parts, which he played on an Oberheim synthesizer. (Note: In Titelman's recollection: "Gary came over just to work on this one track, and it worked out beautifully.") Wright thereby became the only musician other than Harrison to appear on all of his post-Beatles solo albums up to that point, beginning with All Things Must Pass. The orchestral strings on the song were arranged by Del Newman and overdubbed at AIR Studios in London.

The 1978 sessions marked the first time that Harrison had shared the producer's role on one of his albums since working with Phil Spector in the early 1970s. (Note: Harrison had been keen to work with another producer since 1975. On Thirty Three & 1/3, he was "assisted" by Tom Scott, who had been unable to commit to a full co-producer's role due in part to his position as musical director of the ABC television series Starsky & Hutch.) Leng considers that on "If You Believe", the horn sounds, Harrison's slide guitar riffs and the orchestral strings contribute to the song's retrogressive quality, by mirroring the sound Harrison had first achieved with Spector in 1970. Leng identifies Hall & Oates' "The Last Time" – which was a homage to Spector's 1960s productions, and featured a slide guitar part by Harrison – as the trigger for his return to the All Things Must Pass sound. (Note: Harrison's contribution to the Hall & Oates track marked a rare guest appearance by him during this period, and came about through his association with their producer, David Foster.) Leng highlights the syncopated rhythm section in the opening verse of "If You Believe" as especially reminiscent of "The Last Time", which was itself derivative of "Leader of the Pack" by the Shangri-Las.

== Release ==
George Harrison was released on Dark Horse Records on 20 February 1979. "If You Believe" was sequenced as the final track on the album, after "Soft Touch". Coinciding with the release, Harrison and Arias attended the Brazilian Grand Prix in São Paulo, and were joined there by Wright and his wife, who were travelling in South America at the time. (Note: Keen to introduce new influences into his work, Wright made recordings of local musicians while in Rio de Janeiro. He returned to these tapes in the 1990s and incorporated Brazilian sounds in his world music album First Signs of Life, on which Harrison also appears.) The song was published by Harrison's companies Oops and Ganga (subsequently combined as Umlaut Corporation) and Warner Bros. Music.

Harrison did minimal promotion for the album, which lessened its commercial impact in Britain. In an interview with Mick Brown, for Rolling Stone, Harrison said he was pleased with all the songs but identified "If You Believe" and "Soft Touch" as the ones he was least impressed by. In the case of "If You Believe", Harrison added: "I like the sentiment of that, but it's a bit obvious as a tune …" With "Blow Away" and "Love Comes to Everyone" earmarked as singles from the album, "If You Believe" was also considered but the release did not take place.

== Critical reception ==
George Harrison received favourable reviews from the majority of music critics, many of whom remarked on Harrison's obvious contentment with life. Billboard magazine's reviewer wrote that the album continued in the optimistic tone Harrison had established with Thirty Three & 1/3, and included "If You Believe" among its "best cuts". Writing in Melody Maker, E.J. Thribb said that Harrison offered "an answer to all the world's problems (or some of them) with 'If You Believe'". He quoted the opening verse and concluded: "Actually, I'd subscribe to that theory." People's reviewer recognised the song as typifying the album's "lyrically cheery and thematically uplifting" qualities but also its prevalence of unremarkable arrangements, saying that the performance on the track was "reminiscent of the Big Sound (slide guitar, horns et al) Harrison achieved on his epic All Things Must Pass". The reviewer added that "new Harrison fans" would be better served by searching out the 1970 triple album rather than buying the new release. Harry George of the NME said that Harrison's love for Arias had seemingly replaced his devotion to Krishna and had reinvigorated his music. George identified "If You Believe" as one of the few tracks on which the backing musicians were "breaking sweat" amid the predominantly calm mood, although he viewed it and "Love Comes to Everyone" as "solid medium-pacers, neither thrilling nor negligible".

Writing for Goldmine magazine in 2002, Dave Thompson cited the New Year's Day writing session as the start of a prolific period for Harrison and recognised his revisiting All Things Must Pass for inspiration as equally important for the 1979 album's success. PopMatters' Jason Korenkiewicz welcomed the 2004 reissue of George Harrison, and described the song as a "brief but joyous country spiritual" that was among the three standout tracks, along with "Blow Away" and "Here Comes the Moon". Former Mojo editor Mat Snow praises the same three songs as the best of Harrison's "romantic and reflective" songwriting on the album and says that this quality was complemented by Titelman's "tastefully contemporary" sound. In another 2004 review, John Metzger of The Music Box highlighted Wright's appearance among reasons why the two-year gap between Harrison albums was "well worth [the wait]". Metzger said that "Each track on George Harrison was a folk-pop gem that felt like a lost Beatles tune" and added that, although the production was sometimes overly polished, "the slicker textures weren't enough to sink the often airy and uplifting arrangements."

Among Harrison and Beatles biographers, Robert Rodriguez views "If You Believe" as a worthy choice for a single after the similarly commercial "Love Comes to Everyone", and describes it as "nearly as engaging" as the US hit "Blow Away". Ian Inglis writes that the song "lacks the innovative qualities of 'Within You Without You,' the melodic impact of 'My Sweet Lord,' and the lyrical complexity of 'Living in the Material World'", and he views it as "a perfectly pleasant but ultimately unremarkable track". Simon Leng comments that, whereas the sound on George Harrison generally signals both a maturation of and a departure from the artist's previous work, the song appears formulaic and derivative. He says that it "sounds like it was conceived to be a hit single" yet "doesn't completely convince".

== Personnel ==
- George Harrison – vocals, acoustic guitars, slide guitars, backing vocals
- Gary Wright – Oberheim synthesizer
- Neil Larsen – piano
- Willie Weeks – bass
- Andy Newmark – drums
- Del Newman – string arrangement

== Sources ==
- Dale C. Allison Jr, The Love There That's Sleeping: The Art and Spirituality of George Harrison, Continuum (New York, NY, 2006; ISBN 978-0-8264-1917-0).
- Keith Badman, The Beatles Diary Volume 2: After the Break-Up 1970–2001, Omnibus Press (London, 2001; ISBN 0-7119-8307-0).
- Alan Clayson, George Harrison, Sanctuary (London, 2003; ISBN 1-86074-489-3).
- George Harrison, I Me Mine, Chronicle Books (San Francisco, CA, 2002; ISBN 0-8118-3793-9).
- Bill Harry, The George Harrison Encyclopedia, Virgin Books (London, 2003; ISBN 978-0753508220).
- Elliot J. Huntley, Mystical One: George Harrison – After the Break-up of the Beatles, Guernica Editions (Toronto, ON, 2006; ISBN 1-55071-197-0).
- Ian Inglis, The Words and Music of George Harrison, Praeger (Santa Barbara, CA, 2010; ISBN 978-0-313-37532-3).
- Ashley Kahn (ed.), George Harrison on George Harrison: Interviews and Encounters, Chicago Review Press (Chicago, IL, 2020; ISBN 978-1-64160-051-4).
- Simon Leng, While My Guitar Gently Weeps: The Music of George Harrison, Hal Leonard (Milwaukee, WI, 2006; ISBN 1-4234-0609-5).
- Thomas MacFarlane, The Music of George Harrison, Routledge (Abingdon, UK, 2019; ISBN 978-1-138-59910-9).
- Chip Madinger & Mark Easter, Eight Arms to Hold You: The Solo Beatles Compendium, 44.1 Productions (Chesterfield, MO, 2000; ISBN 0-615-11724-4).
- Robert Rodriguez, Fab Four FAQ 2.0: The Beatles' Solo Years, 1970–1980, Backbeat Books (Milwaukee, WI, 2010; ISBN 978-1-4165-9093-4).
- Mat Snow, The Beatles Solo: The Illustrated Chronicles of John, Paul, George, and Ringo After The Beatles (Volume 3: George), Race Point Publishing (New York, NY, 2013; ISBN 978-1-937994-26-6).
- Gary Tillery, Working Class Mystic: A Spiritual Biography of George Harrison, Quest Books (Wheaton, IL, 2011; ISBN 978-0-8356-0900-5).
- Bob Woffinden, The Beatles Apart, Proteus (London, 1981; ISBN 0-906071-89-5).
- Gary Wright, Dream Weaver: A Memoir; Music, Meditation, and My Friendship with George Harrison, Tarcher/Penguin (New York, NY, 2014; ISBN 978-0-399-16523-8).
