= Your Love Is Forever =

- Picture disc for 1979 single B-side

Song by George Harrison

from the album George Harrison
- Released: 20 February 1979
- Length: 4:48
- Label: Dark Horse
- Songwriter(s): George Harrison
- Producer(s): George Harrison, Russ Titelman

George Harrison track listing
- 10 tracks Side one: 1. "Love Comes to Everyone"; 2. "Not Guilty"; 3. "Here Comes the Moon"; 4. "Soft-Hearted Hana"; 5. "Blow Away"; Side two: 6. "Faster"; 7. "Dark Sweet Lady"; 8. "Your Love Is Forever"; 9. "Soft Touch"; 10. "If You Believe"

"Your Love Is Forever" is a song by English rock musician George Harrison from his 1979 album George Harrison. He wrote it as a guitar instrumental in an open tuning, before adding lyrics at the suggestion of his co-producer, Russ Titelman. The lyrics have an ambiguity typical of Harrison's work, in that the love he expresses is directed towards both a romantic partner and his God. In the United Kingdom, the song was also issued as the B-side of "Faster", on a charity single benefiting the cancer research project set up by the late Formula 1 driver Gunnar Nilsson.

Harrison wrote the lyrics to "Your Love Is Forever" in February 1978 while holiday on the Hawaiian island of Maui with his girlfriend, Olivia Arias, as they prepared to become parents for the first time. The song demonstrates a Hawaiian influence in the mood of the track, while also drawing on Harrison's absorption in Indian music since the 1960s. The ambient arrangement includes Harrison's open-tuned electric guitars, played through a Roland effects pedal, and a slide guitar part that reflected a development of his Indian-inspired microtonal style. Some music critics have recognised the song as a highlight of George Harrison and of the artist's Dark Horse Records catalogue.

== Background ==
George Harrison wrote the tune for "Your Love Is Forever" as an instrumental. He said he composed it in an alternative guitar tuning, which made it difficult to find the chords he wanted but encouraged an experimental approach. The song remained an instrumental piece until Russ Titelman, the Warner Bros. Records staff producer who co-produced George Harrison, persuaded Harrison to write some lyrics. Titelman recalled first hearing the song in Los Angeles on a cassette of demos that Harrison presented before they began working on the album. According to Titelman: "[The demo] included just the guitar part of 'Your Love is Forever', which I think is one of the most beautiful songs that George ever wrote. So I said to him, 'You have to write a lyric to this.' And he did."

The album was Harrison's first since Thirty Three & ⅓ in 1976, after which he and his girlfriend, Olivia Arias, had spent a year travelling and attending races in the 1977 Formula 1 world championship. He completed "Your Love Is Forever" and other songs for the new album in February 1978, while holidaying on the Hawaiian island of Maui with Arias. The holiday was a highly productive time for Harrison and a happy period for the couple as they awaited the birth of their son. In Harrison's 1980 autobiography, I, Me, Mine, his handwritten lyrics to the song are dated 23 February. Arias, in her introduction to the 2002 edition of the book, recalls that Harrison started writing the song about his love for her and their newfound love for Hawaii, "but the love in the opening verse soon turned to Divine Love."

== Composition ==
Continuing his approach on Thirty Three & ⅓, Harrison favoured an understated religious message in his songs on George Harrison, relative to the overt Hindu-aligned religiosity of his albums up to 1974. Author Simon Leng writes that the song's melody and lyrics combine to evoke a picture of beauty. He says that the opening guitar passage, played in open D tuning, "partly honour[s] the Chet Atkins tradition of guitar instrumentals while simultaneously mirroring the tonal stillness of Indian music". In musicologist Thomas MacFarlane's view, the composition serves as a hybrid of Western music and an Eastern musical aesthetic, and is the realisation of Ravi Shankar's advice to Harrison that he combine his musical roots with a personal mode of expression. (Note: Harrison studied sitar under Shankar's tutelage between 1966 and 1968, at which point he returned to the guitar as his main instrument. Titelman was also a student of Shankar's in the 1960s, attending classes at the latter's Kinnara School of Music in Los Angeles.) Author Ian Inglis says the melody has a radiant quality in the manner of the Beatles' "Because" and the song retains a mood that reflects its Hawaiian origins.

After opening with the long instrumental passage, the composition consists of two verses and choruses, followed by an instrumental verse and a final chorus. On Harrison's recording, the instrumental break consists of a slide guitar solo playing in counterpoint to the main verse melody.

Christian theologian Dale Allison views "Your Love Is Forever" as a song that can be read as being directed to "Olivia or God or both". He says that the line "the only lover worth it all" strongly suggests a religious interpretation. He also cites the song as an example of Harrison demonstrating that God and love are one and the same, and that God exists in the present rather than removed from everyday life. He adds that Harrison's perception of his deity as a romantic partner aligns especially with Hindu philosophy and "allegorical interpretations of the romantic love of Krishna and Radha". In Inglis's view, it is primarily a love song to Arias, in which Harrison offers contrasting images of summer and winter but concludes that their romantic love is eternal.

== Recording ==
Harrison began recording his self-titled album in April 1978. The sessions took place at his home studio, FPSHOT, in Henley-on-Thames, Oxfordshire. Aside from Harrison on guitars, the musicians on "Your Love Is Forever" were Steve Winwood (keyboards), Willie Weeks (bass) and Andy Newmark (drums). Newmark recalled a far "mellower" Harrison, compared with his demeanour when they last worked together, in 1974. The death of Harrison's father in May delayed plans for his and Arias's wedding. They were married in a private ceremony in Henley in September, a month after the birth of their son, Dhani. (Note: Harrison named him after the last two notes in the Indian whole-tone scale, dha and ni.)

Harrison played his main electric guitar parts using a Roland effects pedal, which he also credited as inspiring the melody of "Love Comes to Everyone". He said this effect added to the atmosphere of "Your Love Is Forever" as it gave the sound an added warmth. His slide guitar contributions appear only during the solo and in a brief passage towards the end of the song.

In MacFarlane's description, Harrison's vocal combines a folk sensitivity with phrasing closer to jazz. He views the arrangement on the recording as "remarkably subtle", with the slide guitar solo the most significant addition, and attributes the track's "vast soundscape" to the Roland-treated guitars. Author Peter Lavezzoli highlights the recording as a post-1974 example of Harrison continuing to infuse his slide playing with an Indian influence and develop his signature style combining "sweetness of tone, melodic precision, and use of slide outside the traditional blues context". (Note: Harrison rarely used Indian instruments on his recordings from this period, but the George Harrison track "Here Comes the Moon", written about an especially impressive sunset on Maui, included a sitar.)

== Release ==
Distributed by Warner's, the album was released on Harrison's Dark Horse record label on 20 February 1979. "Your Love Is Forever" appeared as the third track on side two of the LP, between "Dark Sweet Lady" and "Soft Touch". In Inglis's view, it thereby serves as the centrepiece of a "mini-trilogy" of songs in which Harrison openly celebrates his "domestic bliss" with Arias and their newborn son.

As with the songs' lyrical content, the overt Hindu imagery familiar from most of Harrison's 1970s albums was minimal in the LP design. The words "Hare Krishna" were printed on the inner sleeve, below a photo of Harrison walking through the infield of a Formula 1 circuit. In an interview to promote the album, Harrison likened "Your Love Is Forever" to "My Sweet Lord", saying that it conveyed the same spiritual message but more subtly, so as to avoid offending his audience, and because he had matured and was "a bit more laid back".

In July 1979, the song was issued on the third single from George Harrison, as the B-side to "Faster". The proceeds from the record went to the cancer research project set up by F1 driver Gunnar Nilsson shortly before his death from cancer in late 1978. A UK-only release, the single was also available as a limited-edition picture disc, marking the first time that a record by a former Beatle was issued in this format.

Harrison later paired "Your Love Is Forever" with the Thirty Three & ⅓ track "Learning How to Love You" as songs that he believed were the equal of his 1969 composition "Something". He rued that these more recent songs had not gained the same recognition "because it was the Beatles who made 'Something'". (Note: In a 1992 interview coinciding with his receiving the inaugural Billboard Century Award, Harrison named "Your Love Is Forever" as one of the songs when Timothy White asked if he had a favourite, "overlooked" composition.) Mojo included Trevor Moss & Hannah-Lou's recording of the song on Harrison Covered, a tribute CD accompanying the November 2011 issue of the magazine.

In 2017, while launching the updated edition of I, Me, Mine, Arias said "Your Love Is Forever" was among her favourite of all her late husband's songs. Highlighting the opening lines, "Sublime is the summertime warm and lazy / These are perfect days like heaven's about here", she said it conveyed "Those times in your life when everything is just smooth and beautiful and you can really be your best self and who you want to be."

== Critical reception ==
George Harrison received favourable reviews from music critics. Harry George of the NME wrote that Harrison's happiness with Arias had seemingly replaced Krishna as a muse and had reinvigorated his music. He said that the album succeeded on Harrison's "guileless romanticism" in tracks where "Crafty harmonies and skilfully-layered guitars recall the sun-soaked vistas of 'Because' and 'Sun King' on Abbey Road." Writing in Melody Maker, E.J. Thribb admired Harrison for bringing "both sunshine and moonshine into our lives" and recognised "Your Love Is Forever" as a song with the artist's "[trademark] chiming guitar chords" and "ringing sincerity" in the vocals.

Reviewing the 2004 reissues of Harrison's Dark Horse Records catalogue, for Blender, Paul Du Noyer named the song as the first of the "standout tracks" on George Harrison, which he described as the product of Harrison's "twin retreats of tropical Hawaii and rural England, reflecting a man content to let the rock & roll mainstream pass him by". James Griffiths of The Guardian paired "Your Love Is Forever" with the 1981 devotional "Life Itself" as two "transcendentally lovely" songs, and examples of how Harrison's Dark Horse releases were often unjustly overlooked. Writing in The Rolling Stone Album Guide that same year, Mac Randall said that "mellowness overwhelms musicality" on George Harrison, although he made an exception of "Not Guilty" and the "understated gem" "Your Love Is Forever".

On the occasion of the album's 40th anniversary in 2019, Morgan Enos of Billboard described "Your Love Is Forever" as one of the songs that "waft[ed] in from the rainforest air" on Maui, adding that it was a "droning, ambient love ballad to Olivia" that "practically invented Cocteau Twins". Thomas MacFarlane writes of Harrison's success in fusing Western and Eastern musical elements in the song: "Certain musical moments can only be described as miraculous. When such moments are created through the medium of sound recording, they become gifts that continue to fascinate and inspire." In his song review for AllMusic, Lindsay Planer views it as a standout of what he calls "Harrison’s vital and almost blasphemously underappreciated late 1970s/early 1980s catalogue". Lindsay admires the melody and lyrics, including the "beautifully pastoral imagery of the ebb and flow of seasonal changes", and the atmosphere created by the electric and slide guitars and supported by Newmark's understated drumming.

Simon Leng recognises "Your Love Is Forever" and "Life Itself" as Harrison tracks that are "the closest to his musical 'soul'", whereby "his meticulous craftsmanship as a singer, guitar player, and arranger was used to create aural replicas of grace." Deeming it "George Harrison's musical image of heaven", with a slide guitar solo that "reveals exquisite lyricism", Leng views the song as the clearest example of Harrison sharing the aesthetic forwarded by American composer Alan Hovhaness earlier in the twentieth century, when Hovhaness, similarly drawing inspiration from Eastern music and religion, bucked prevailing trends by steadfastly celebrating melody over atonality. Ian Inglis includes "Your Love Is Forever" among the Harrison songs that possess "great charm, energy, and beauty" yet may be little known compared with those from the artist's most critically acclaimed albums. Inglis calls it a "beautifully controlled track" and an example of how, similar to the surge in the Beatles' productivity during their 1968 visit to Rishikesh in India, Harrison's first Maui holiday released a "vein of sophisticated and delicate music that was previously hidden".

== Personnel ==
According to Simon Leng (except where noted):

- George Harrison – vocals, electric guitars, slide guitars, backing vocals
- Steve Winwood – synthesizer
- Willie Weeks – bass
- Andy Newmark – drums

== Sources ==
- Dale C. Allison Jr, The Love There That's Sleeping: The Art and Spirituality of George Harrison, Continuum (New York, NY, 2006; ISBN 978-0-8264-1917-0).
- Keith Badman, The Beatles Diary Volume 2: After the Break-Up 1970–2001, Omnibus Press (London, 2001; ISBN 0-7119-8307-0).
- Nathan Brackett & Christian Hoard (eds), The New Rolling Stone Album Guide (4th edn), Simon & Schuster (New York, NY, 2004; ISBN 0-7432-0169-8).
- Alan Clayson, George Harrison, Sanctuary (London, 2003; ISBN 1-86074-489-3).
- George Harrison, I Me Mine, Chronicle Books (San Francisco, CA, 2002 [1980]; ISBN 0-8118-3793-9).
- Bill Harry, The George Harrison Encyclopedia, Virgin Books (London, 2003; ISBN 978-0-7535-0822-0).
- Elliot J. Huntley, Mystical One: George Harrison – After the Break-up of the Beatles, Guernica Editions (Toronto, ON, 2006; ISBN 1-55071-197-0).
- Ian Inglis, The Words and Music of George Harrison, Praeger (Santa Barbara, CA, 2010; ISBN 978-0-313-37532-3).
- Ashley Kahn (ed.), George Harrison on George Harrison: Interviews and Encounters, Chicago Review Press (Chicago, IL, 2020; ISBN 978-1-64160-051-4).
- Peter Lavezzoli, The Dawn of Indian Music in the West, Continuum (New York, NY, 2006; ISBN 0-8264-2819-3).
- Simon Leng, While My Guitar Gently Weeps: The Music of George Harrison, Hal Leonard (Milwaukee, WI, 2006; ISBN 1-4234-0609-5).
- Thomas MacFarlane, The Music of George Harrison, Routledge (Abingdon, UK, 2019; ISBN 978-1-138-59910-9).
- Chip Madinger & Mark Easter, Eight Arms to Hold You: The Solo Beatles Compendium, 44.1 Productions (Chesterfield, MO, 2000; ISBN 0-615-11724-4).
- Robert Rodriguez, Fab Four FAQ 2.0: The Beatles' Solo Years, 1970–1980, Backbeat Books (Milwaukee, WI, 2010; ISBN 978-1-4165-9093-4).
- Gary Tillery, Working Class Mystic: A Spiritual Biography of George Harrison, Quest Books (Wheaton, IL, 2011; ISBN 978-0-8356-0900-5).
- Bob Woffinden, The Beatles Apart, Proteus (London, 1981; ISBN 0-906071-89-5).
