= Soft Touch =

- West German single label (B-side)

Song by George Harrison

from the album George Harrison
- Released: 20 February 1979
- Genre: Pop-rock
- Length: 3:59
- Label: Dark Horse
- Songwriter(s): George Harrison
- Producer(s): George Harrison, Russ Titelman

George Harrison track listing
- 10 tracks Side one: 1. "Love Comes to Everyone"; 2. "Not Guilty"; 3. "Here Comes the Moon"; 4. "Soft-Hearted Hana"; 5. "Blow Away"; Side two: 6. "Faster"; 7. "Dark Sweet Lady"; 8. "Your Love Is Forever"; 9. "Soft Touch"; 10. "If You Believe"

"Soft Touch" is a song by English rock musician George Harrison from his 1979 album George Harrison. It was also issued as the B-side of the album's lead single, "Blow Away", in Britain and some other countries, while in markets such as North America, it was the B-side of the second single, "Love Comes to Everyone". Harrison wrote the song while in the Virgin Islands with his future wife, Olivia Arias, shortly before recording his 1976 album Thirty Three & ⅓. The song is a love song in which Harrison also conveys his wonder at the idyllic island setting.

Harrison recorded "Soft Touch" in 1978 at his home studio, FPSHOT, in Oxfordshire. The track includes synthesizer contributions from Steve Winwood and was co-produced by Harrison and Russ Titelman.

== Background and composition ==
George Harrison began writing "Soft Touch" in March 1976 while holidaying with his girlfriend, Olivia Arias, in the Virgin Islands. The holiday served as a songwriting session for Harrison's first album on his Dark Horse record label, Thirty Three & ⅓, and also as an escape from the problems he faced with the copyright infringement suit relating to his 1970 hit song "My Sweet Lord". The title for "Soft Touch" came from American musician Jim Keltner, who used to call Harrison a "soft touch" because of his generosity towards his friends and fellow musicians.

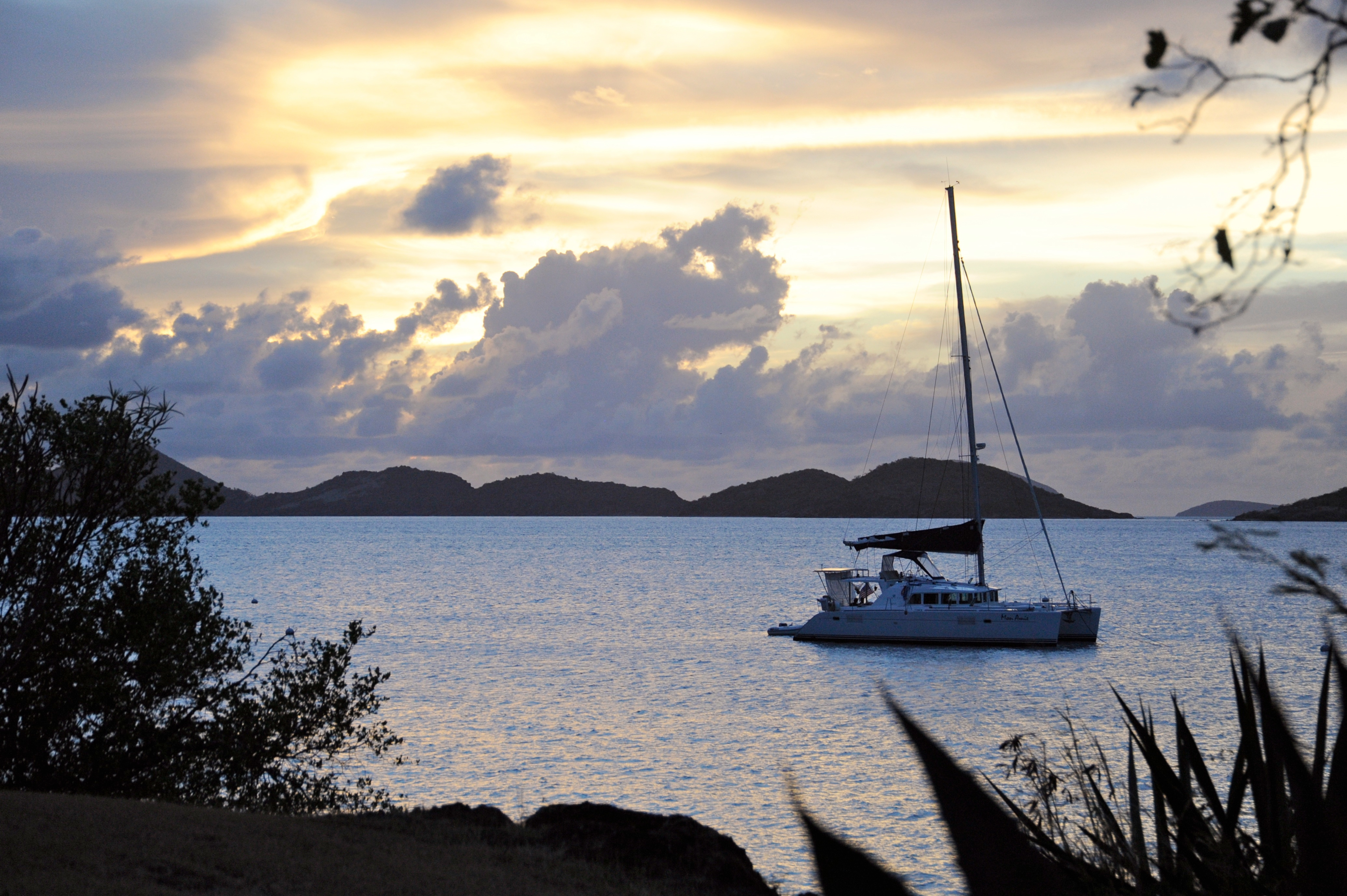
Sunset at Caneel Bay in the Virgin Islands

Harrison based the melody on the horn line in his 1970 track "Run of the Mill". In his 1980 autobiography, I, Me, Mine, he recalls that the new composition originated from his playing the horn part on a guitar. He says that the song's lyrics convey "everything that was going on in the Islands … the wind, the cool breeze blowing, the palm trees, the new moon rising". As with the early drafts of "It's What You Value", which was also inspired by his friendship with Keltner, the handwritten lyrics are reproduced in I, Me, Mine on stationery from the Caneel Bay Plantation in Virgin Islands National Park.

In her foreword to the 2002 edition of I, Me, Mine, Olivia Harrison (Note: Arias and Harrison were married in September 1978, a month after the birth of their son Dhani.) refers to Harrison's brief commentary on "Soft Touch" as an example of how his handwritten notes reveal significant details that may not be apparent at first glance. She comments on his inclusion of the phrase "Bridge (noch ein mal)", which uses the German for "One more time", a phrase that the Beatles took to calling out to each other on stage during their shows in Hamburg in the early 1960s. As further background to "Soft Touch", she recalls that she and Harrison were joined in the Virgin Islands by comedian Eric Idle of Monty Python, and that the noise they created attracted complaints from television producer Norman Lear and his wife, activist and journalist Frances Lear, who were staying in the neighbouring house. Olivia adds that, once the Lears learned that it was George Harrison who was responsible for the loud music, Norman Lear "again knocked on our door, this time apologising and pleading for George to play as much music as he liked".

"Soft Touch" is a secular love song and, in the view of theologian Dale Allison, lacks the religious aspect commonly found in Harrison's love songs. Author Ian Inglis writes that whereas the term "soft touch" usually refers to someone who is easy to convince, in Harrison's song, it describes "a caring and gentle nature", with the lyrics evoking "physical and emotional tenderness". He says that the words work in tandem with the music, which includes a "delicate" descending riff. Inglis describes the narrative as a mix of "warm contentment", through phrases such as "eyes that shine", "treetops whisper" and "a new moon", and the idyllic surroundings, evoked through the references to ocean waves and sailing.

== Recording ==
Harrison did not include "Soft Touch" on Thirty Three & ⅓ but recorded it in 1978 for his next album, George Harrison. In the intervening years, he had increasingly sought out activities outside music, which included travel with Arias, compiling material for his autobiography, and participating in Idle's comedy projects. (Note: Along with Keltner, Idle contributed to "This Song", which was Harrison's musical parody of the 1976 "My Sweet Lord" court case. Idle provided the "ratbag" voices on the recording while Keltner appeared as the judge in the promotional film for the song.) The sessions for the album took place at Harrison's studio, FPSHOT, in Oxfordshire between April and October 1978, and coincided with a period of tranquility in his life as he and Arias awaited the birth of their first child. Andy Newmark, who played drums on the song, described Harrison as "a new George" and "only mellower" compared with when they had worked together in 1974 – a year when Harrison had exhausted himself through his commitment to launching Dark Horse Records in conjunction with his first concert tour as a solo artist.

Although most of the album was written on the Hawaiian island of Maui in February 1978, "Soft Touch" fitted the tropical theme of Harrison's more recent material. Harrison biographer Elliot Huntley describes the musical arrangement as having "lashings of acoustic and Hawaiian [slide] guitars", while author Alan Clayson considers it to be more evocative of Maui than other tracks on the album, with the song "transmitt[ing] the blue curvature of the ocean" through the "swoop" of Harrison's guitar riffs. Simon Leng comments that the arrangement, particularly the guitar parts, mirrors that of the song "Round and Round" from Splinter's final album for Dark Horse, Two Man Band. (Note: Harrison played lead guitar on "Round and Round" and one other track on Splinter's 1977 album. Although he was also listed as executive producer, these contributions marked his only formal recordings during 1977.) He also cites "Soft Touch" as an example of Harrison adopting a less American sound in his work; referring to Ray Cooper's conga playing on the track, Leng writes: "he sounds English, not Cuban; like Cooper, not Armando Peraza."

== Release ==
George Harrison was released on Dark Horse Records on 20 February 1979. "Soft Touch" was sequenced as the penultimate track, between "Your Love Is Forever" and "If You Believe". Inglis recognises it as the last song in a trilogy of tracks that "celebrate his newfound domestic bliss", after "Dark Sweet Lady" and "Your Love Is Forever". (Note: The song reflected the inspiration provided by Dhani's birth through Harrison's replacement of the word "sun" with "son" on the lyric sheet (in the line "A warm son rises") – a gesture that Inglis deems "touching and personal".) In Britain, "Soft Touch" was also issued as the B-side of the album's lead single, "Blow Away", on 16 February. In North America, it instead appeared as the B-side of the follow-up single, "Love Comes to Everyone", which was originally scheduled as the lead single.

Harrison did minimal promotion for the album, content to let the music make its mark as he focused on establishing HandMade Films to finance Monty Python's Life of Brian and other Python-related film projects. In an interview with Mick Brown, for Rolling Stone, Harrison said he was pleased with all the songs on the album but identified "Soft Touch" and "If You Believe" as the ones he was least impressed by. He said that "Soft Touch" was "just pleasant but there's nothing special about it, I feel." The title of the song was adopted for an international Harrison fanzine that was produced in Glasgow. The publication turned its scope to cover all the former Beatles in the early 1980s, however, due to Harrison's withdrawal from the public eye following John Lennon's murder in New York.

Leng views "Soft Touch" as another "instalment of South Seas bliss" from Harrison and indicative of the artist's avoidance of all contemporary musical trends on his self-titled 1979 album. Leng adds that the song would have held little appeal to rock critics at the time but instead satisfied the criteria outlined by Harrison's friends among the Formula 1 community, for "nice, relaxing music". Inglis admires the synergy of lyrics and music on the song as "effortless and entirely natural", and adds: "While contemporary genres such as punk and heavy metal sometimes found it difficult to blend intimate, romantic messages with sympathetic musical accompaniments, Harrison seems to have achieved a near-seamless blend of the two." He recognises Harrison's co-producer, Russ Titelman, and the playing of backing musicians such as Steve Winwood as equally responsible for this achievement, saying that their contributions contrasted with the extravagance heard on some of Harrison's early 1970s work and so matched his requirement for "a less aggressive, and more subtle, musical philosophy" from 1976 onwards.

== Personnel ==
According to Simon Leng:

- George Harrison – vocals, acoustic and electric guitars, slide guitars, backing vocals
- Steve Winwood – synthesizer
- Neil Larsen – organ
- Willie Weeks – bass
- Andy Newmark – drums
- Ray Cooper – congas

== Sources ==
- Dale C. Allison Jr, The Love There That's Sleeping: The Art and Spirituality of George Harrison, Continuum (New York, NY, 2006; ISBN 978-0-8264-1917-0).
- Keith Badman, The Beatles Diary Volume 2: After the Break-Up 1970–2001, Omnibus Press (London, 2001; ISBN 0-7119-8307-0).
- Alan Clayson, George Harrison, Sanctuary (London, 2003; ISBN 1-86074-489-3).
- George Harrison, I Me Mine, Chronicle Books (San Francisco, CA, 2002 [1980]; ISBN 0-8118-3793-9).
- Bill Harry, The George Harrison Encyclopedia, Virgin Books (London, 2003; ISBN 978-0753508220).
- Elliot J. Huntley, Mystical One: George Harrison – After the Break-up of the Beatles, Guernica Editions (Toronto, ON, 2006; ISBN 1-55071-197-0).
- Ian Inglis, The Words and Music of George Harrison, Praeger (Santa Barbara, CA, 2010; ISBN 978-0-313-37532-3).
- Ashley Kahn (ed.), George Harrison on George Harrison: Interviews and Encounters, Chicago Review Press (Chicago, IL, 2020; ISBN 978-1-64160-051-4).
- Simon Leng, While My Guitar Gently Weeps: The Music of George Harrison, Hal Leonard (Milwaukee, WI, 2006; ISBN 1-4234-0609-5).
- Chip Madinger & Mark Easter, Eight Arms to Hold You: The Solo Beatles Compendium, 44.1 Productions (Chesterfield, MO, 2000; ISBN 0-615-11724-4).
- Robert Rodriguez, Fab Four FAQ 2.0: The Beatles' Solo Years, 1970–1980, Backbeat Books (Milwaukee, WI, 2010; ISBN 978-1-4165-9093-4).
- Mat Snow, The Beatles Solo: The Illustrated Chronicles of John, Paul, George, and Ringo After The Beatles (Volume 3: George), Race Point Publishing (New York, NY, 2013; ISBN 978-1-937994-26-6).
- Gary Tillery, Working Class Mystic: A Spiritual Biography of George Harrison, Quest Books (Wheaton, IL, 2011; ISBN 978-0-8356-0900-5).
- Bob Woffinden, The Beatles Apart, Proteus (London, 1981; ISBN 0-906071-89-5).
