= Blow Away =

- US picture sleeve

Single by George Harrison

from the album George Harrison
- B-side: "Soft-Hearted Hana" (US); "Soft Touch" (UK)
- Released: 14 February 1979
- Genre: Pop rock, soft rock
- Length: 3:59
- Label: Dark Horse
- Songwriter: George Harrison
- Producers: George Harrison, Russ Titelman

George Harrison singles chronology
"It's What You Value" (1977)	"Blow Away" (1979)	"Love Comes to Everyone" (1979)

George Harrison track listing
- 10 tracks Side one: 1. "Love Comes to Everyone"; 2. "Not Guilty"; 3. "Here Comes the Moon"; 4. "Soft-Hearted Hana"; 5. "Blow Away"; Side two: 6. "Faster"; 7. "Dark Sweet Lady"; 8. "Your Love Is Forever"; 9. "Soft Touch"; 10. "If You Believe"

Music video
- ”Blow Away” on YouTube

"Blow Away" is a song by English musician George Harrison that was released in February 1979 on his album George Harrison. It was also the lead single from the album. The song is one of Harrison's most popular recordings from his solo career and has appeared on the compilations Best of Dark Horse 1976–1989 and Let It Roll: Songs by George Harrison.

== Writing and recording ==
In his autobiography, I, Me, Mine, Harrison says that the song arose from feelings of frustration and inadequacy resulting from a leaking roof at his Friar Park home. While viewing the downpour from an outbuilding on the property, he realised that, in surrendering to the problem, he was merely exacerbating it. With this realisation, the episode served as a reminder that he, in fact, "loved everybody" and should seek to be more optimistic. Additionally, he notes that, while he initially felt self-conscious about the song, thinking it "so obvious", the track grew on him when he recorded it.

== Music video ==
The video for "Blow Away" includes shots of Harrison miming to the song superimposed over footage of moving clouds and land, and in some instances, accompanied by large toys (a wind-up duck; sitting in a toy swan and on a dog). There are also instances of Harrison acting silly – breaking into a quick smirk as the camera closes in on the lyric "be happy", and doing a playful dance step. This video was not included on the Dark Horse Years box set DVD.

== Release and reception ==
In the United States, "Blow Away" was released as a single on 14 February, alongside the US release of George Harrison. It was backed by "Soft-Hearted Hana". Two days later, it was issued as in the UK, where it was backed by "Soft Touch". Billboard's singles reviewer said "Blow Away" had a "catchy melody" and that Harrison was in "top form both vocally and lyrically". Cash Box listed the single first in its "feature picks" for the week, saying that it might "augur a new beginning" for the artist, with its buoyant mood, "strumming acoustic guitars, wood block beat, synthesizer moods and appealing singing". Record World said it has Harrison's "familiar guitar sound and a pop/rock beat that should appeal to several formats." Nick DeRiso of Ultimate Classic Rock calls it "a soul-lifting track about clearing skies and opening hearts that's aged as well as any '70s-era solo Beatles single".

"Blow Away" reached number 51 on the UK Singles Chart, his first chart appearance on that chart since "You" in 1975. The single peaked at number 16 and number 7, respectively, in the United States and Canada. On the US Easy Listening chart, it reached number 2.

"Blow Away" became one of Harrison's more popular songs among his fans. In 2010, AOL radio listeners chose the track as one of the "10 Best George Harrison Songs", appearing at number 2 on the list, behind "My Sweet Lord". "Blow Away" appears on the Harrison compilations Best of Dark Horse 1976–1989 (1989) and Let It Roll: Songs by George Harrison (2009). His demo of the song was released as an iTunes-exclusive bonus track on George Harrison.

== Personnel ==
According to author Simon Leng:

- George Harrison – vocals, 12-string acoustic guitars, electric guitar, slide guitar, backing vocals
- Neil Larsen – electric piano
- Andy Newmark – drums
- Willie Weeks – bass
- Ray Cooper – percussion
- Del Newman – string arrangement

== Chart performance ==
=== Weekly charts ===
Chart (1979)	Peak position
Australia (Kent Music Report)	34
Canada (CRIA)	16
Canadian RPM 100	7
Canadian RPM Adult Contemporary	5
New Zealand Singles Chart	30
UK Singles Chart	51
US Billboard Top 50 Adult Contemporary	2
US Billboard Hot 100	16
US Cash Box Top 100	12

=== Year-end charts ===
Chart (1979)	Rank
Canadian RPM Top Singles	75
US Cash Box Singles	99

== Sources ==
- Leng, Simon (2006). While My Guitar Gently Weeps: The Music of George Harrison. Milwaukee, WI: Hal Leonard. ISBN 978-1-4234-0609-9.
