= Barry Fantoni =

British author and comic strip cartoonist (1940–2025)

Barry Ernest Fantoni (28 February 1940 – 20 May 2025) was a British author, cartoonist and jazz musician, most famous for his work with the magazine Private Eye, for whom he also created Neasden F.C. He also published books on Chinese astrology as well as a mystery novel set in Miami featuring 87-year-old private investigator Harry Lipkin.

== Life and career ==
Fantoni was born to an Italian father and a Jewish mother of French and Dutch extraction, both gifted musicians, and grew up in London's East End. Fantoni was educated at the Archbishop Temple School in London. At the age of fourteen, he was awarded the Wedgewood Scholarship for the Arts and studied at the Camberwell School of Arts and Crafts from 1954 until 1958. There, he formed the school's first jazz group as well as a film society and pioneered a drama group before getting expelled.

In 1963, Fantoni became a member of the editorial staff of the satirical magazine Private Eye. He was behind some of the magazine's most famous characters and appeared in all but 31 of its 1,278 issues until his retirement in 2010. He also wrote scripts for the BBC TV programme That Was the Week That Was in 1962.

Fantoni hosted a short-lived BBC TV show called A Whole Scene Going in 1966, which won him the title of Male TV Personality of the Year. The show focused on contemporary trends in the arts: Twiggy made her first appearance on the show, and it also featured performances from the Who, the Kinks and the Pretty Things. He illustrated the sheet music for "Let's Go to San Francisco" by the Flower Pot Men.

In 2006, the National Portrait Gallery, London acquired 17 drawings by Fantoni, including portraits of comedians and politicians, such as Bruce Forsyth, Frankie Howerd and Harold Wilson. The Gallery's collection also contains several photographic portraits of Fantoni himself.

On 27 January 2007 he debuted on BBC Radio 5 Live's Fighting Talk. He scored 28 points thus finishing in last place which is a programme tradition for a debutant. In September 2007, he was a guest on Private Passions, the weekly music discussion programme hosted by Michael Berkeley on BBC Radio 3.

Fantoni died in Turin, Italy, on 20 May 2025, at the age of 85.

== E. J. Thribb (17½) ==
Fantoni was the creator and writer of poems supposedly penned by one E. J. Thribb – the fictitious poet-in-residence at Private Eye. His poems are usually about recently deceased famous people, and always begin "So, farewell then...".

Thribb also usually mentions the deceased's "catchphrase" or theme song and his poems often feature his friend Keith, or Keith's mum, who usually does something "like" the deceased. The poetry consists of a stream of consciousness which is just broken up into lines.

== Selected filmography ==
- Just Like a Woman (1967)
- The Strange Affair (1968)
- Otley (1968)
