= Back Home (Eric Clapton album) =

Studio album by Eric Clapton
- Released: 29 August 2005
- Recorded: 2004–05
- Studio: The Town House, London, Olympic Studios, London and Los Angeles
- Genre: Blues rock, reggae, folk rock
- Length: 60:17
- Label: Duck/Reprise
- Producer: Eric Clapton, Simon Climie

Eric Clapton chronology
Me and Mr. Johnson (2004)	Back Home (2005)	The Road to Escondido (2006)

Back Home is the seventeenth solo studio album by Eric Clapton. It was released 29 August 2005 internationally and a day later in the U.S. It is his first album containing new, original material since Reptile (2001), as the previous release Me and Mr. Johnson is an album of song covers of Robert Johnson.

The song, "Say What You Will," was used by the Japanese musical group SMAP.

== Critical reception ==
Professional ratings
Aggregate scores
Source	Rating
Metacritic	52/100
Review scores
Source	Rating
AllMusic	2/5 stars
PopMatters	4/10
Q	3/5 stars
Rolling Stone	3/5 stars

Back Home was met with "mixed or average" reviews from critics. At Metacritic, which assigns a weighted average rating out of 100 to reviews from mainstream publications, this release received an average score of 52 based on 10 reviews.

== Track listing ==
No.	Title	Writer(s)	Length
1.	"So Tired"	Eric Clapton, Simon Climie	4:48
2.	"Say What You Will"	Clapton, Climie	4:37
3.	"I'm Going Left"	Stevie Wonder, Syreeta Wright	4:03
4.	"Love Don't Love Nobody"	Joseph Jefferson, Charles Simmons	7:13
5.	"Revolution"	Clapton, Climie	5:01
6.	"Love Comes to Everyone"	George Harrison	4:34
7.	"Lost And Found"	Doyle Bramhall II, Jeremy Stacey	5:20
8.	"Piece of My Heart"	Bramhall, Susannah Melvoin, Mike Elizondo	4:23
9.	"One Day"	Vince Gill, Beverly Darnall	5:20
10.	"One Track Mind"	Clapton, Climie	5:03
11.	"Run Home to Me"	Clapton, Climie	6:17
12.	"Back Home"	Clapton	3:33

== DualDisc version ==
The special edition DualDisc format of the album features the whole album in surround sound, an interview with Clapton, and five selections from the album played live in the studio. This special package also featured four exclusive guitar picks which display "Back Home" and Clapton's signature on them. The picks came in violet, blue, red, and grey.

== Personnel ==
- Eric Clapton – lead vocals, guitar
- Doyle Bramhall II – guitar
- Andy Fairweather-Low – baritone guitar
- Vince Gill – guitar
- John Mayer – guitar
- Robert Randolph – pedal steel guitar
- Simon Climie – keyboards, programming
- Toby Baker – keyboards
- Billy Preston – keyboards, acoustic piano, Hammond organ
- Chris Stainton – keyboards
- Steve Winwood – keyboards
- Nathan East – bass guitar
- Paul Fakhourie – bass guitar
- Pino Palladino – bass guitar
- Steve Gadd – drums
- Abe Laboriel Jr. – drums
- Nicky Shaw – programming, percussion
- Kick Horns – brass
- Gavyn Wright – violin
- Isobel Griffiths – strings
- Nick Ingman – strings
- Michelle John – backing vocals
- Sharon White – backing vocals
- Lawrence Johnson – backing vocals

=== Production ===
- Eric Clapton – producer, cover design concept, liner notes
- Simon Climie – producer, Pro Tools engineer
- Alan Douglas – recording engineer
- Bea Henkel – second assistant engineer
- George Renwick – assistant engineer
- Phillippe Rose – assistant engineer
- Mick Guzauski – mix engineer
- Tom Bender – mix assistant
- Joel Evendeen – assistant Pro Tools
- Jonathan Shakhovskoy – assistant Pro Tools
- Bob Ludwig – mastering at Gateway Mastering (Portland, ME).
- Lee Dickson – guitar technician
- Debbie Johnson – session coordinator (Los Angeles).
- Bushbranch – management
- Catherine Roylance – art direction and design
- Paul Higgens – illustration
- Chris Sykes – main photography
- Allan Titmuss – photography
- Jill Furmanovsky – photography
- Dunlop Management, Inc. – pick pack concept

== Awards ==
Alan Douglas and Mick Guzauski (engineer) won the 2006 Grammy Award for Best Engineered Album, Non-Classical for the album.

== George Harrison tribute ==
Back Home was Clapton's first studio album released after the death of his close friend George Harrison in November 2001. Clapton covered Harrison's song "Love Comes to Everyone" from his 1979 self-titled album as tribute. Clapton had played the guitar introduction on the original version. In Japan during the tour of George Harrison with Eric Clapton and his band, the song was played but only once, the first night (1 December 1991, Yokohama Arena).

== Charts ==
=== Weekly charts ===
Chart (2005)	Peak position
Austrian Albums (Ö3 Austria)	9
Belgian Albums (Ultratop Flanders)	29
Belgian Albums (Ultratop Wallonia)	11
Danish Albums (Hitlisten)	4
Dutch Albums (Album Top 100)	9
European Top 100 Albums (IFPI)	3
Finnish Albums (Suomen virallinen lista)	16
French Albums (SNEP)	16
German Albums (Offizielle Top 100)	2
Greek Album (IFPI)	6
Hungarian Albums (MAHASZ)	22
Irish Albums (IRMA)	57
Italian Albums (FIMI)	4
Japanese Albums (Oricon)	4
Norwegian Albums (VG-lista)	6
Polish Albums (ZPAV)	14
Scottish Albums (OCC)	21
Spanish Albums (Promusicae)	10
Swedish Albums (Sverigetopplistan)	5
Swiss Albums (Schweizer Hitparade)	4
UK Albums (OCC)	19
UK Physical Albums (OCC)	19
US Billboard 200	13
US Top Internet Albums (Billboard)	13

=== Year-end charts ===
Chart (2005)	Peak position
Austrian Albums (Ö3 Austria)	165
Danish Albums (Hitlisten)	98
German Albums (Offizielle Top 100)	141
Norwegian Albums (VG-lista)	95
Swiss Albums (Schweizer Hitparade)	174

== Certifications ==
Region	Certification	Certified units/sales
Denmark (IFPI Danmark)	Gold	20,000^{^}
Greece (IFPI Greece)	Gold	10,000^{^}
Italy (FIMI)	Gold	40,000^{*}
Japan (RIAJ)	Gold	195,000
Netherlands (NVPI)	Gold	40,000^{^}
Spain (Promusicae)	Gold	50,000^{^}
Sweden (GLF)	Gold	30,000^{^}
United States (RIAA)	Gold	680,000
^{*} Sales figures based on certification alone.^{^} Shipments figures based on certification alone.
