= Del Newman =

British musician (1930–2020)

Derrick Martin "Del" Newman (5 October 1930 – 10 August 2020) was a British conductor, orchestral arranger and music producer. His orchestral arrangements appeared on songs by many rock and pop artists from the 1960s to the 1990s, including Cat Stevens, Elton John, Carly Simon and Rod Stewart. His work also encompassed Hollywood film scores and West End musicals.

== Early life ==
Newman was born Derrick Martin Morrow in London. His father was a doctor of West African descent, and his mother was an Irish nurse. He was adopted by the Newman family when he was a few months old. At the age of seven, he began learning to play the cello and the piano.

After serving with the Royal Navy, he studied music at university in Exeter and London and then at Trinity College of Music, where he chose to specialise in musical composition and conducting. He received tuition from composer Elisabeth Lutyens and conductor Antal Doráti, among others.

== Career ==
Newman worked on guitarist Gordon Giltrap's self-titled 1968 album and subsequently provided string arrangements for Cat Stevens' Mona Bone JakonTea for the Tillerman (1970) and Teaser and the Firecat (1971). In addition to working with Elton John, Carly Simon and Rod Stewart, Newman contributed orchestral arrangements to albums by Asha Puthli, Peter Frampton, Harry Nilsson, Paul Simon, Scott Walker, Donovan, 10cc, George Harrison, Brian Protheroe and many other artists throughout the 1970s. Referring to Newman's sympathetic work on John's Goodbye Yellow Brick Road album, author James E. Perone likens the "fully integrated" aspect of their collaborations to that of George Martin's musical arrangements for the Beatles.

Newman conducted George Martin's orchestral score for Paul McCartney and Wings' theme song for the 1973 James Bond film Live and Let Die. He also conducted the orchestra for McCartney's 1974 One Hand Clapping documentary and the live album released in 2024.

Among his projects as a record producer, Newman produced Scott Walker's 1973 album Stretch, which included his composition "Someone Who Cared". He also produced Asha Puthli's debut, self-titled solo album in 1973. In 1980, Newman wrote the orchestration to and conducted the Italian entry in that year's Eurovision Song Contest, "Non So Che Darei", performed and written by Alan Sorrenti. The song finished in 7th place.

In the 2000s, Newman withdrew from recording to focus on teaching. His autobiography, A Touch from God: It's Only Rock & Roll, was published in 2010. In October 2015, he received a Gold Badge Award from the British Academy of Songwriters, Composers and Authors for his contribution to music in the United Kingdom. He died at the age of 89 on 10 August 2020 in Carmarthen, Wales.
