= Bob Woffinden =

British journalist (1948–2018)

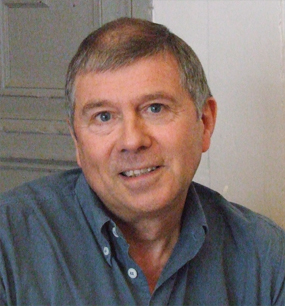
- Born: Robert Woffinden; 31 January 1948; Birmingham, England
- Died: 1 May 2018 (aged 70)
- Education: University of Sheffield
- Occupation: Journalist specialising in miscarriages of justice
- Years active: 1980s–2018

Robert Woffinden (31 January 1948 – 1 May 2018) was a British investigative journalist. Formerly a reporter with the New Musical Express, he later specialised in investigating miscarriages of justice. He wrote about a number of high-profile cases in the UK, including James Hanratty, Sion Jenkins, Jeremy Bamber, Charles Ingram, Jonathan King, and Barry George.

In 1999, he was instrumental in winning a case against the Home Secretary that established the right of prisoners in the UK claiming wrongful conviction to receive visits from journalists.

Woffinden was the author or co-author of New Musical Express Book of Rock 2 (1977), The Beatles Apart (1981), The Illustrated New Musical Express Encyclopedia of Rock (1976), Miscarriages of Justice (1987), Hanratty: The Final Verdict (1999) and The Murder of Billy-Jo (2008). For many years he produced the TV documentary series First Tuesday, and wrote for several British media publications, including The Guardian, the New Statesman, the Daily Mail, and the prisoners' newspaper Inside Time.

== Early life ==
Woffinden was educated at King Edward VI School, Lichfield, Staffordshire; and the University of Sheffield.

== Career ==
After leaving university, he joined the New Musical Express as associate editor. In the 1980s, he became aware of failings in the criminal justice system, and wrote Miscarriages of Justice (Hodder & Stoughton, 1987). He joined Yorkshire Television as a documentaries producer, and made films on legal and environmental issues for the First Tuesday documentary series. These included a film on the “cooking oil” disaster in Spain in 1981 which affected over 20,000 people and led to over 300 deaths. The film put forward evidence to show that the scientific investigation was a cover-up and that the real cause of the disaster was not cooking-oil, but organo-phosphate pesticides on tomatoes. The film won prizes at festivals in San Francisco and Venice. He also made a film on the adverse health effects of fluoride.

Another of his films (for Channel 4’s True Stories) was "Hanratty – The Mystery of Deadman's Hill". This led to the reopening of the A6 Murder case by the Home Office, and a fresh legal battle over a case that was already thirty years old. In 1997, he published Hanratty: The Final Verdict (Macmillan). Woffinden tracked down surviving exhibits in the case and asked for these to be tested by DNA methods. After some considerable delay, the new testing was carried out. The Forensic Science Service successfully argued that the new tests conclusively proved Hanratty's guilt, and an appeal in 2002 was thus rejected.

On the two occasions that Woffinden took cases to the House of Lords he won the appeals. In 1995, the Home Secretary Michael Howard ruled that he should not be allowed into jail to visit a prisoner, Ian Simms. This led to an action against the Home Office. Despite the change of government in 1997, the defence of the action was continued by the new Home Secretary, Jack Straw. Finally, in 2000, in what was by then known as the Simms and O’Brien case, Woffinden won the case against the Home Secretary. This thereby established the right of prisoners claiming wrongful conviction to receive visits from journalists.

In 1997, he took up the case of Philip English, a 15-year-old who had been found guilty of the murder of a policeman in Gateshead. Woffinden found new lawyers for him and, in 1999 English’s conviction was quashed. It was the first time a prisoner was released after a House of Lords judgment.

In 2002, with writer Richard Webster, Woffinden helped to win the landmark case of Dawn Reed and Chris Lillie, two nursery nurses who had been portrayed as guilty of abusing children in their care by a Newcastle City Council report. As a result the two were in hiding, in fear for their lives. Webster and Woffinden helped them find lawyers. In 2002 Reed and Lillie won £200,000 each (the maximum possible) in defamation proceedings against Newcastle City Council.

Other cases in which he was involved included that of Sion Jenkins, the deputy headteacher convicted of the murder of his foster daughter Billie-Jo. Jenkins' conviction was quashed in 2004.

He argued that there were wrongful convictions in other high-profile cases, including those of the music impresario Jonathan King, who was convicted of sexual offences against teenage boys; and in the case of Barry George, convicted of the murder of television presenter Jill Dando. Woffinden had been contacted by someone from military intelligence who told him that the murder was committed by a Serbian terrorist.

An article by Woffinden in the Daily Mail of 9 October 2004 – titled "Is the Coughing Major Innocent?" – drew attention to a possible miscarriage of justice in the case of three people convicted for cheating their way to the top prize on the UK game show Who Wants to Be a Millionaire? In collaboration with James Plaskett, he published a book about the case, Bad Show: The Quiz, the Cough, the Millionaire Major, in January 2015.

== Selected publications ==
- The Beatles Apart, Proteus, London, 1981. ISBN 0-906071-89-5
- (with Nick Logan) The Illustrated Encyclopaedia of Rock, Salamander, London, 1982. ISBN 0-86101-116-3
- Miscarriages of Justice, Coronet, Sevenoaks, 1989. ISBN 0-340-42406-0
- Hanratty: The Final Verdict, Pan, London, 1999. ISBN 0-330-35301-2
- (with Sion Jenkins) The Murder of Billie-Jo, Metro, 2009. ISBN 1844546292
- (with James Plaskett) Bad Show: The Quiz, the Cough, the Millionaire Major, Bojangles Books, 2015. ISBN 0993075525
- The Nicholas Cases, Bojangles Books, 2016. ISBN 0993075509
