= E. J. Thribb =

Fictional obituary writer

E. J. Thribb is the fictitious poet-in-residence at the satirical magazine Private Eye. The character was created in 1972 by Barry Fantoni, who wrote the poems until 2010, when he was succeeded by other staff members. Thribb was represented in the very early days with a photo of Barry's friend and PE staffer, Eric Hands. Thribb's poems are usually about recently deceased famous people, and titled "In Memoriam", with the first line almost invariably reading: "So. Farewell then...". He is an obituarist and threnodist.

Thribb usually mentions the deceased's catchphrase or theme song, and his poems often feature his friend Keith, or Keith's mum, who is usually "like" the deceased in some way.

Thribb's poetry is characterised by deadpan delivery and a stream of consciousness which is broken up into short lines seemingly at random, and has very little rhyme, rhythm or reason.

Thribb usually signs his poems with his name and age – 17½ – although sometimes this will be modified to allude to something else for which the deceased is famous. He sometimes signs himself E. Jarvis Thribb.

In the first issue after the death of Peter Cook, comedian and longtime proprietor and financial supporter of Private Eye, the magazine's cover consisted simply of a photograph of Cook beneath, in large print, the phrase "So. Farewell then...".

Original writer Barry Fantoni stopped writing Thribb in December 2010, upon his retirement from the Eye. Later contributors included Christopher Booker. The identity of the current poet(s) has not been revealed.
