= Mat Snow =

British journalist (born 1958)

Mat Snow (born 20 October 1958) is an English music journalist, magazine editor, and author. From 1995 to 1999, he was the editor of Mojo magazine; he subsequently served in the same role on the football magazine FourFourTwo.

During the 1980s, Snow wrote regularly for the NME, as a reviewer and feature writer, in addition to contributing to publications such as Sounds and Q. He has twice been recognised as "Editor of the Year" by the British Society of Magazine Editors, winning for Mojo in 1996 and FourFourTwo in 2002. As an author, his books include Nick Cave: Sinner Saint and The Beatles Solo.

== Career ==
=== As reporter and reviewer ===
Snow began writing gig reviews for the NME in 1982, covering performances at London venues such as the Lyceum, Brixton's Ace Cinema, the Dominion Theatre and Ronnie Scott's. His reviews included pieces on the post-punk bands the Birthday Party, the Go-Betweens, Depeche Mode and Orchestral Manoeuvres in the Dark. Snow was an early champion of the American band R.E.M., about whom he wrote in April 1984: "Reckoning and its predecessor, last year's Murmur, confirm R.E.M. as one of the most beautifully exciting groups on the planet."

In 1986, he was the subject of Nick Cave's anti-journalistic "Scum", a song that the NME's website includes in a list of "Music's Mightiest Diss Tracks". Although the pair had become friendly in 1981, Cave had taken exception when Snow referred to his 1985 album as "disappointing". Snow learnt of the Australian singer's displeasure while interviewing him in August 1986, as Cave told him: "I didn't write ['Scum'] about the press; I wrote it about you." Speaking to The Guardian in December 2006, Snow said of "Scum": "It's a brilliant record ... Like Dylan's Mr Jones or Pope's Colley Cibber, I'd rather be memorialised as the spotlit object of a genius's scorn than a dusty discographical footnote."

While also writing album reviews, Snow interviewed many other artists between 1983 and 1995 – for Sounds, Q and the NME. His interviewees include the following: Elvis Costello, AC/DC, Björk, Tom Petty, Kate Bush, David Byrne, Morrissey, John Cale, Jimmy Page, David Gilmour, Robert Plant, Marianne Faithfull, Bryan Ferry, Keith Richards, Iggy Pop, Leonard Cohen and Elton John.

=== Editorship of Mojo and FourFourTwo ===
In 1993, together with journalist and author Lloyd Bradley, Snow came up with the initial concept for what became the UK men's magazine Maxim. The idea was discarded until publisher Felix Dennis reworked it for a younger readership, so creating a successful rival title to IPC Media's Loaded.

Snow took over the Mojo editorship from the magazine's founder, Paul Du Noyer, in 1995. In November the following year, the British Society of Magazine Editors (BSME) voted him "Editor of the Year", in the non-weekly "special interest" category, for his work on Mojo.

In the book Media Organization and Production, Eamonn Forde cites Snow among editors who advocate an approach combining "three interrelated roles" – namely "the journalistic", "the financial" and "the managerial" – rather than focusing purely on newsroom content. The same book quotes him on the demise of Melody Maker, following IPC's attempts to tailor that long-running title to a younger readership in 1999: "they identified a niche in that market, but is there a market in that niche?" Barney Hoskyns, a former Mojo contributor, views Snow as a rare exception among magazine editors, about whom he says: "Very few bother to make one feel at all valuable."

After leaving Mojo, Snow worked as editorial consultant to Cabal Communications. In March 2001, he was announced as the new editor of Haymarket's popular football magazine, FourFourTwo. While acknowledging his lack of professional experience with sports titles, Snow told The Guardian that football had "always been my vice"; he added that he hoped to give the magazine the same lighthearted tone typical of Q and Mojo. In 2002, Snow won a second BSME "Editor of the Year" award, for his editorship of FourFourTwo.

=== As author ===
Having interviewed Paul McCartney as part of Mojo's coverage of the Beatles' 1995–96 Anthology project, Snow authored a four-volume book on the former band members' careers after the group's break-up, titled The Beatles Solo (2013). The book was one of several Beatles-related titles released in 2013, 50 years after the band's rise to fame. Snow's other books include Nick Cave: Sinner Saint, published by Plexus in 2011.

Snow currently works as the editorial consultant to the music journalism website Rock's Backpages. His writing has also appeared in The Guardian, for which he first interviewed Leonard Cohen in 1988. In October 2014, Race Point published U2: Revolution, Snow's U2 biography.

== Books and publications ==
- Nick Cave: Sinner Saint: The True Confessions, Thirty Years of Essential Interviews (2011)
- The Beatles Solo: The Illustrated Chronicles of John, Paul, George and Ringo after The Beatles (2013)
- King: My Autobiography. Ledley King (2013)
- U2: Revolution (2014)
