= Ashley Kahn =

American music historian & journalist (born 1960)

Ashley Kahn (b. 1960) is an American music historian, journalist, and producer.

== Biography ==
He was born in the Bronx, New York, and was raised in Cincinnati. Kahn graduated from Columbia University in 1983. While attending Columbia, he hosted a jazz and blues radio show on WKCR, and was known on the air as "The Cincinnati Kid."

In 2014, Kahn co-authored the autobiography of Carlos Santana, titled The Universal Tone: Bringing My Story To Light.

In 2015, Kahn was awarded a Grammy for his album notes to the John Coltrane release Offering: Live at Temple University.

In 2026, Kahn won a Grammy for his album notes for Miles ’55: The Prestige Recordings by Miles Davis.

To date, his best books have been on two jazz albums, Kind of Blue by Miles Davis and A Love Supreme by John Coltrane. He pens articles, interviews and other features on music and is a liner note writer for a variety of music labels for which he has earned three ASCAP/Deems Taylor awards, and three Grammy nominations.

He currently teaches at New York University Tisch School of the Arts's Clive Davis Institute for Recorded Music.

== Bibliography ==
- Rolling Stone: The Seventies, with Rolling Stone, Holly George-Warren, Shawn Dahl, 1998 for the first edition, Little Brown & Co, USA, ISBN 0-316-75914-7
- The Rolling Stone Jazz & Blues Album Guide with John Swenson, 1999 for the first edition, Random House, ISBN 0-679-76873-4
- Kind of Blue: The Making of the Miles Davis Masterpiece, foreword by Jimmy Cobb, 2001, Da Capo Press, USA, ISBN 0-306-81067-0
- A Love Supreme: The Story of John Coltrane's Signature Album, foreword by Elvin Jones, 2002 for the first edition, Viking Penguin, USA, ISBN 0-670-03136-4
- The House That Trane Built: The Story of Impulse Records. (2006) W. W. Norton, ISBN 0-393-05879-4
- The Color of Jazz: Album Cover Photographs by Pete Turner. (2006) Rizzoli International, ISBN 0-8478-5798-0
- The Blue Note Years: The Photographs of Francis Wolff & Jimmy Katz. (2009) Jazzprezzo, ISBN 3-9810250-8-3
- The Universal Tone: Bringing My Story To Light — Carlos Santana's autobiography (2014) Little, Brown, ISBN 0316244929
- Days of miracle and wonder: Paul Simon and the trials and triumphs of Graceland. New York: Atria Books. 2026. ISBN 978-1-6682-0675-1. OCLC 1569640536.
