= I, Me, Mine =

Book by George Harrison

- I, Me, Mine book cover
- Author: George Harrison
- Genre: Memoir
- Publisher: Genesis Publications
- Publication date: August 1980
- Media type: Book, audio CD, e-book
- Pages: 398 (1st ed.); 456 (2002 reprint); 570 (2017 ed.)
- ISBN: 978-0-671-42787-0 (1st ed.)

I, Me, Mine is an autobiographic memoir by the English musician George Harrison, formerly of the Beatles. It was published in 1980 as a hand-bound, limited edition book by Genesis Publications, with a mixture of printed text and multi-colour facsimiles of Harrison's handwritten song lyrics. It was limited to 2,000 signed copies, with a foreword and narration by Derek Taylor. The Genesis limited edition sold out soon after publication, and it was subsequently published in hardback and paperback in black ink by W H Allen in London and by Simon & Schuster in New York.

== Background ==
The project marked a departure for Genesis Publications, which had previously focused on facsimile editions of historical nautical journals, including The Log of H.M.S. Bounty 1787–1789. Brian Roylance, who founded the company in 1974, said of Harrison's memoir: "I saw the song lyrics as important documents – as important as all the other things I was publishing." Genesis subsequently became a leading publisher of rock music-related illustrated books, including further titles by Harrison and Taylor, as well as books about the Beatles, The Rolling Stones, David Bowie and Pink Floyd, among others.

== Reception ==
I, Me, Mine was released a few months before John Lennon's murder in December 1980. Lennon took offence at Harrison's book, telling interviewer David Sheff: "I was hurt by it ... By glaring omission in the book, my influence on his life is absolutely zilch and nil ... I'm not in the book." Harrison does mention Lennon several times, although not as a musical influence, which was the point of Lennon's displeasure.

In December 1987, Harrison was asked about Lennon's comments by Selina Scott on the television show West 57th Street. He told her: "[Lennon] was annoyed 'cause I didn't say that he'd written one line of this song 'Taxman'. But I also didn't say how I wrote two lines of 'Come Together' or three lines of 'Eleanor Rigby', you know? I wasn't getting into any of that. I think, in the balance, I would have had more things to be niggled with him about than he would have had with me."

== Later editions ==
In 2002, I, Me, Mine was re-published with a new foreword by Harrison's widow, Olivia. A third version of the book, now containing "59 additional handwritten lyrics and unpublished photographs not found in the original printing", was released in February 2017 to mark what would have been Harrison's 74th birthday.
