= The Beatles bootleg recordings =

Illegal audio of the band's songs

The Beatles' bootleg recordings are recordings of performances by the Beatles that have attained some level of public circulation without being available as a legal release. The term most often refers to audio recordings, but also includes video performances. Starting with vinyl releases in the 1970s, through CD issues in the late 1980s, and continuing with digital downloads starting in the mid-1990s, the Beatles have been, and continue to be, among the most bootlegged artists.

Bootleg recordings arise from a multitude of sources, including radio and TV broadcast performances, live shows, studio outtakes and session tapes, alternate mixes, test discs, and home demos. The largest single source of Beatles bootleg material is the set of Nagra audio tapes from the 1969 filming of the Get Back / Let It Be rehearsal and recording sessions.

== Historical overview ==
The first notable Beatles bootleg was Kum Back, issued around January 1970 in a plain white sleeve with plain white labels and no mention of a record company. This vinyl bootleg was based on an acetate of one of the early rough mixes by Glyn Johns of the Get Back album (which would later become Let It Be). John Lennon may have been the unintentional source for one of the Get Back bootlegs; Lennon said: "They say it came from an acetate that I gave to someone who then went and broadcast it as being an advance pressing or something."

Other notable bootlegs to appear in the early 1970s were Yellow Matter Custard, containing 14 BBC Radio performances from 1963, (originally these tracks were thought to be from the Decca audition of January 1962, and Lennon himself told McCartney about the album) and Sweet Apple Trax, a two-volume four-disc collection of songs and jams from the Get Back rehearsal sessions first issued in 1974. In 1977, a copy of the Beatles' Decca audition tape was bought by a collector, who released the songs over a series of seven 45 rpm singles pressed on coloured vinyl with full colour picture sleeves. Bootleggers of this era often copied and repackaged each other's releases, so popular titles often appeared from more than one bootleg label. The biggest labels for Beatles material in the 1970s were Kornyfone (TAKRL), ContraBand, Trademark of Quality and Wizardo.

EMI had planned to release an album of alternate takes and previously unreleased songs by the Beatles in 1985 called Sessions, but the Beatles objected after it had been compiled; by the end of the year, bootleg copies were widely available. During the cataloguing and review of the EMI archives in the early 1980s in preparation for the Sessions album and a multimedia show given at Abbey Road Studios, it is suspected that high quality copies of some of the material were surreptitiously made. This may have been the source for the Ultra Rare Trax CD series from Swingin' Pig that started appearing in 1988, which provided takes never previously bootlegged in clarity that rivalled official releases.

The late 1980s also saw the emergence of Yellow Dog, a label specialising in Beatles studio outtakes, who released the CD series Unsurpassed Masters in quality similar to Ultra Rare Trax; Yellow Dog, like Swingin' Pig's parent company Perfect Beat, was registered in Luxembourg, which had the most liberal copyright laws among EU countries. Yellow Dog released Unsurpassed Demos in 1991, featuring 22 songs from the 1968 Kinfauns (Esher) demos, only some of which had been previously made public during the radio series The Lost Lennon Tapes that debuted in 1988.

In 1993, a nine CD box set of the Beatles' BBC radio performances was released in Italy by Great Dane. The official Live at the BBC and Anthology releases in 1994–1996 covered much of the highlights of previously bootlegged material, in sound quality that most bootlegs could not match. However, new bootlegs continued to appear, with bootleggers including the word "anthology" in the title of many of their collections. Starting in 1999, Silent Sea issued a series of CD-Rs, featuring recompiled studio outtakes with commercial-quality packaging and liner notes. In 2000, the Vigotone label followed up their earlier eight-CD package of Get Back session recordings with a seventeen-CD collection called Thirty Days. In the early 2000s, the DVD format enhanced the availability of Beatles bootleg videos, covering filmed concerts, TV appearances, promotional films, and even rare clips and outtakes. The six-volume The Lost Album series, published between 2017 and 2025, was an attempt to bring together almost all of the Beatles' unpublished or never officially released recordings.

The availability of high-speed Internet has transformed the bootlegging industry. The Purple Chick label has assembled and digitally fine-tuned many comprehensive themed packages, including individual studio album sessions, the Get Back sessions, and the BBC performances, all distributed free through various fan trading sites online. Author Richie Unterberger noted that it is "now theoretically possible to assemble a complete collection of the circulating unreleased Beatles recordings without ever buying a bootleg."

== Commonly bootlegged material ==
Several books have been devoted to comprehensively documenting Beatles bootlegs; the following is a list of some of the most common or notable bootlegged recordings by the Beatles.

=== The Quarrymen / Silver Beatles era (1957–1960) ===
Other than the commercially released songs with Tony Sheridan issued on In the Beginning (Circa 1960), only three recordings made by the group prior to 1962 have become public.

- The Quarrymen show, 6 July 1957. The Quarrymen played a show for the Woolton fête at St Peter's Parish Church, notable as the day that Paul McCartney was first introduced to Lennon by a mutual friend, Ivan Vaughan. In 1994, Bob Molyneux, a retired policeman, rediscovered a reel-to-reel tape he had made of the show while experimenting with a Grundig portable tape recorder. The tape contained a poor quality recording of the Quarrymen performances of Lonnie Donegan's "Puttin' On the Style" and Elvis Presley's "Baby, Let's Play House". A thirty-second excerpt of "Putting on the Style" was released to promote the tape's auction at Sotheby's later that year; the tape was bought by EMI for £78,500, becoming the most expensive recording ever sold at auction. EMI decided the recording was not of sufficient quality to include in Anthology. After extensive audio restoration, excerpts from both songs were included in the BBC radio documentary The Day John Met Paul, broadcast on 26 June 2007.
- The Quarrymen acetate, 1958. on 12 July 1958, The Quarrymen paid to record themselves at Phillips' Sound Recording Services in Liverpool, performing "That'll Be the Day" and "In Spite of All the Danger". These were included on Anthology 1, although the latter song was edited.
- Home rehearsals, 1960. More than one hour of the band's home rehearsals from 1960 have appeared on bootlegs, although the recording's date and location are uncertain. McCartney once said that it was taped at his home in April 1960; the recording may also originate from two separate sessions a few months apart. Three of the songs were included on Anthology 1. The recording also featured early versions of songs that the Beatles would later record in the studio ("Matchbox", "One After 909", "I'll Follow the Sun"). Other songs that were recorded during these rehearsals include "Well, Darlin'", "Hello Little Girl", "That's When Your Heartaches Begin", "Wildcat", "I'll Always Be in Love with You", "Some Days", "Hallelujah I Love Her So", "The World Is Waiting for the Sunrise", "You Must Write Every Day", "Movin' and Groovin'", and "Ramrod".

A collection of all these recordings were released on the bootleg recording Lapis Lazuli, featuring a longer version of "Puttin' on the Style" and all of the Beatles home recordings made in early 1960.

=== Decca audition (1962) ===
The Beatles performed fifteen songs that were recorded at their audition for Decca Records on 1 January 1962 (three Lennon–McCartney compositions and twelve cover versions). Five of these songs were included on Anthology 1.

Fourteen of the fifteen tracks appeared on a series of coloured vinyl singles with picture sleeves, released in 1978 on the Deccagone label through Strawberry Fields Forever, Joe Pope's fanzine. The following year, all fifteen tracks appeared on the Circuit Records bootleg album The Decca Tapes.

Due to the questionable copyright status of these performances (recorded prior to the group's EMI contract), the Decca audition was commercially distributed in various configurations starting in 1981; some of these "grey market" albums omitted the three Lennon–McCartney songs. By the late 1980s, legal action by the Beatles had halted commercial availability of the albums. In addition to continued inclusion on bootlegs, a small US record label issued the songs on CD through mail order in 2007 as The Lost Decca Sessions, which it described as legal and licensed.

=== Cavern Club rehearsals and TV shoot (1962) ===
Sometime between August and December 1962, the Beatles recorded themselves rehearsing at the Cavern Club, performing "I Saw Her Standing There", "One After 909" (two versions), and "Catswalk" (two versions).

On 22 August 1962, a crew from Granada Television shot footage of the band performing live at the Cavern for use in the television show Scene at 6:30; the crew filmed two takes of the band performing "Some Other Guy." The following month, on 5 September, a Granada sound crew returned to capture better audio of the band to sync to the film footage, as they felt the audio from the original shoot was not of satisfactory quality. A new recording of "Some Other Guy" and a recording of "Kansas City/Hey-Hey-Hey-Hey!" come from this performance. The shoot constitutes the earliest professional film footage of the Beatles, and would have been the Beatles' first appearance on television, but the footage was shelved for over a year, and was first broadcast after the Beatles had achieved nationwide success. Instead, Grenada booked the group for a live, in-studio performance on 17 October 1962. The Cavern footage has been seen on The Beatles Anthology and other documentary sources, and audio from both dates have circulated amongst bootleggers.

=== Star-Club performances (1962) ===
As the Beatles were concluding their final two-week Hamburg engagement in late December 1962, portions of their performances were taped by Star-Club stage manager Adrian Barber; the tapes were acquired by Ted "Kingsize" Taylor, the leader of KingsizeTaylor and The Dominoes at the club. Eventually Taylor sold the tapes, which formed the basis of the double album Live! at the Star-Club in Hamburg, Germany; 1962, released in 1977 by Lingasong Records.

The liner notes for the initial release falsely implied that the recordings had been made in the spring of 1962, prior to the Beatles' EMI contract, on a night when Ringo Starr happened to be sitting in for Pete Best. In commentary for a lawsuit to block the album's release, John Lennon wrote, "the sleeve note, apart from being inaccurate, seems to have been written with a court case in mind." The Beatles lost their case, so the album was viewed as a legitimate release. The thirty songs contained on the initial releases were re-licensed over the following two decades to multiple record labels, most notably Sony Music, which packaged the songs in CD form in 1991 (although the product was withdrawn the following year as legal action was pending from the Beatles). After another lawsuit by the Beatles, Lingasong agreed in 1998 to hand over the original tapes and stop all sales.

Compared with a properly recorded live concert, the sound quality of the tape is poor, with the vocals in particular sounding "muffled and distant" at best. But for a recording made with 1 mic from the audience with a home-use reel-to-reel, the quality is very good. The Beatles display a rawness that matches the raucous Hamburg atmosphere. While the Beatles would later record many of the thirty songs in the studio or perform them for the BBC, nine of the songs would never be officially released in another version.

Additional material from the Star-Club tapes has been bootlegged, including "Road Runner", "Money (That's What I Want)" (with Tony Sheridan singing lead), and a full version of "Red Hot", and alternate performances of several songs.

=== The BBC sessions (1962–1965) ===
The Beatles performed for fifty-two BBC Radio programmes, beginning with an appearance on the series Teenager's Turn—Here We Go, recorded on 7 March 1962, and ending with the special The Beatles Invite You to Take a Ticket to Ride, recorded on 26 May 1965; in total, 275 performances of 88 different songs were broadcast. Early bootlegs of some of the performances were based on low-quality home recordings of the broadcasts from the radio. It was not the BBC's practice to archive either the session tapes or the shows' master tapes, but many good quality distribution copies were found in various BBC departments during research for BBC radio specials produced in the 1980s.

Increasingly comprehensive collections of the BBC performances were bootlegged in the 1980s and early 1990s. The most notable of these was The Complete BBC Sessions, a nine CD box set released in 1993 by Great Dane in Italy, where copyright protection for the broadcasts had expired; The widespread availability of good quality bootlegs prompted Apple's own release of BBC performances in 1994, the two CD set Live at the BBC. The set included 30 of the 36 songs that the Beatles never performed on their studio albums, plus 26 other songs and dialogue among the group members and the radio hosts. In 1999, a 10-CD box set The Complete BBC Sessions 1962-1966 was released in Japan by Secret Trax which was soon followed by 3-CD set Attack of the Filler BEEBS! on the same label featuring additions to the box set.

Starting in the 2000s, the popularity of digital downloads through BitTorrent made it possible to replace physical media with virtual box sets of BBC material provided by fans for fans made available free of charge. In 2004, Purple Chick released The Complete BBC Sessions Upgraded as a digital set of ten audio CDs plus one multimedia CD. In 2010, Hobnail released a virtual 13 disc release Unsurpassed Broadcasts. 2015 saw the release of The BBC Archives, by an anonymous source. This set of 23 virtual CDs and one virtual DVD contains all of the available BBC material in the best quality, as well as some previously unreleased radio shows and upgraded material.

=== Studio outtakes and alternate mixes (1962–1970) ===
A large number of Beatles studio outtakes are available on bootlegs, ranging from complete session tapes—for example, the morning sessions for the Please Please Me album—to more fragmentary samplings, or alternate mixes and performances derived from acetates. The first studio outtake to appear on bootleg was the white album outtake "What's The New Mary Jane" in 1972, which fell into the hands of bootleggers via an acetate that Lennon had traded to a friend. In 1977, rough mixes from acetates of "I Am the Walrus" and "The Fool on the Hill" appeared on bootlegs after being played on a Radio Luxembourg broadcast.

After the Beatles' EMI contract expired in 1976, the company began assessing the band's unreleased material for a future release. The first batch of songs to leak came from an in-house compilation cassette that contained "Leave My Kitten Alone", "One After 909" (from 1963), "If You've Got Trouble", "Christmas Time (Is Here Again)", "That Means a Lot", "Come and Get It", "Dig a Pony" (unedited version), and two medleys from the Get Back / Let It Be sessions: "Rip It Up / Shake, Rattle and Roll" and "Not Fade Away / Bo Diddley".

In 1981, in-house engineer John Barrett was given the task of cataloguing the complete collection of tapes from the band's seven-year career with EMI. This led to two projects: a public audio-visual presentation at Abbey Road Studios called The Beatles Live at Abbey Road (which opened on 18 July 1983) and a planned outtakes album which was to be called Sessions. In addition to some of the songs included on the previously leaked compilation tape, Sessions added "Not Guilty", "What's the New Mary Jane", "How Do You Do It?", "Bésame Mucho", "Mailman, Bring Me No More Blues", "While My Guitar Gently Weeps" (demo), and early takes of "Ob-La-Di, Ob-La-Da" and "I'm Looking Through You". Shortly before the album's scheduled 1985 release, it was vetoed by the surviving members of the band; but both audience recordings of the Abbey Road presentation and the leaked promos of Sessions became available to bootleggers. These songs appeared on bootleg series such as Ultra-Rare Trax and Unsurpassed Masters, along with other material presumably copied while preparing these projects. Most of the aforementioned tracks were officially released on the Anthology albums in 1995 and 1996.

New Beatles studio outtakes continue to occasionally appear; in February 2009, a complete 10:46 recording of “Revolution 1 (Take 20)” from The Beatles sessions was released on the bootleg Revolution: Take... Your Knickers Off!. This version begins with Lennon jokingly counting that way.

=== Live concerts (1963–1966) ===
Many of the Beatles' concert performances have appeared on bootleg albums. The earliest relatively complete concert recording is from the 7 December 1963 show at the Liverpool Empire Theatre. The Beatles Anthology contained video clips from several concerts, some of which are available in complete form on bootleg video. The following are some of the most notable concerts on bootleg releases.

- Washington Coliseum, 1964. The Beatles' first US concert, on 11 February 1964 in Washington, D.C., was captured on black-and-white video for later closed-circuit presentations in cinemas. Some of the video was included in Anthology and in The Beatles: The First US Visit, and most of it was included in the 2003 DVD The Beatles in Washington D.C. from Passport Video. The entire video was released on the grey market DVD Beatles Around the World. All video releases suffer from "dark, grainy, and flickery" image quality; a report of a 2005 auction of the original master tape gives the possibility of a better quality release in the future. In 2010 the Beatles at last came to iTunes and along with their back catalogue they brought with them a video of this show. The video was made available with the purchase of the iTunes version of The Beatles Stereo Box Set simply called The Beatles Box Set where all albums were released as iTunes LP's featuring on-screen album artwork and the Mini Documentaries from the DVD in the physical release.
- Hollywood Bowl, 1964 and 1965. The Beatles at the Hollywood Bowl, an official release by EMI in 1977, contained selections from the Beatles' three Hollywood Bowl shows professionally recorded in August 1964 and August 1965. An authorized CD of the remixed 1977 album with 4 bonus tracks was released in September 2016. Bootleg needle drop copies are available, as well as bootleg compilations of the three performances in their entirety.
- Palais des Sports, 1965. The Beatles performed two shows on 20 June 1965 at the Palais des Sports in Paris. Both were broadcast over French radio, resulting in bootleg recordings of decent quality; video of the second show also exists.
- Shea Stadium, 1965. The Beatles' concert at Shea Stadium on 15 August 1965 was filmed for a television special, The Beatles at Shea Stadium. The programme and its soundtrack have been bootlegged in various formats. One song, "Everybody's Trying to Be My Baby", was officially released on Anthology 2. A thirty-minute reissue of the footage of the concert was remastered and issued simultaneously with the release of the Ron Howard film The Beatles: Eight Days a Week on 15 September 2016.
- Budokan, 1966. The Beatles performed for three days at the Nippon Budokan in Tokyo beginning 30 June 1966, with the first two concerts (30 June 1966 and the afternoon show on 1 July) filmed in colour for Japanese television. The first night's concert video was officially released by Apple in Japan only as Beatles Concert at Budokan 1966. Excerpts from both shows (along with silent colour footage of the first show on 2 July) were included in The Beatles Anthology.
- Candlestick Park, 1966. Notable as the Beatles' final paid concert performance, the 29 August 1966 show at Candlestick Park in San Francisco was taped by press officer Tony Barrow on a portable recorder at the request of McCartney; the tape ran out before the last few minutes of the show.

=== Television performances (1963–1968) ===
The Beatles performed on various television programmes; excerpts from many of these were shown in the Anthology documentary, and bootleg video exists of many of the shows in their entirety. The most famous of these were the four appearances on The Ed Sullivan Show in 1964 and 1965; after many years circulating on bootlegs, these received official DVD release in 2003 as The Four Complete Historic Ed Sullivan Shows Featuring The Beatles.

Other notable television performances that have appeared on bootleg video include the Swedish show Drop In from October 1963 (four songs); the April 1964 UK special Around the Beatles (six songs mimed to new recordings); the June 1964 Australian special The Beatles Sing for Shell (seven songs survived in complete form, plus fragments of two others); and a September 1968 appearance on Frost on Sunday (new vocals for "Hey Jude" and "Revolution" over studio backing tracks, plus brief improvisations), for which multiple takes are available.

=== Home demos (1963–1969) ===
The individual Beatles sometimes recorded basic performances at home of their new compositions, either for copyright purposes (to be sent to Dick James Music publishing affiliate Northern Songs), to later play for the other Beatles, or to be given to other artists.

Many of Lennon's demos that appeared on bootlegs were first heard on the radio series The Lost Lennon Tapes. Some of the Lennon demos available include "Bad to Me" (1963, given to Billy J. Kramer), "I'm in Love" (1963, given to The Fourmost [although some scholars date this as a late seventies piano rendition]), "If I Fell" (1964), and "Everyone Had A Hard Year" (1968, later incorporated into "I've Got a Feeling"). There are also Lennon demos available of songs that would develop into "She Said She Said", "Strawberry Fields Forever", "Good Morning Good Morning", "Across the Universe", "You Know My Name (Look Up the Number)", "Don't Let Me Down", and two songs he would later record after the Beatles, "Oh My Love" and "Cold Turkey". Lennon's home recordings of "Bad to Me" and "I'm in Love" were briefly released on iTunes in December 2013 in order to extend the copyright terms of the tracks.

McCartney's demos include "One and One Is Two" (1964, eventually an uncharted single for The Strangers with Mike Shannon), "Step Inside Love" (1968, given to Cilla Black), "Spiritual Regeneration Song" from India, "Goodbye" (1969, given to Mary Hopkin), "Come and Get it" (1969, given to Badfinger), and early versions of "We Can Work It Out" (partially taped over by Lennon) and "Michelle". Harrison's 1963 demo for "Don't Bother Me" has also been bootlegged.

=== Christmas recordings (1963–1969) ===
Every year from 1963 through to 1969, the Beatles recorded a flexi disc of comedy and music that was sent to members of their fan club. In 1970, these recordings were compiled onto an LP released via their fan club called From Then to You (US title: The Beatles' Christmas Album). Since these singles or compilation album had no official general-public release prior to 2017, all have been frequently bootlegged, some with additional outtakes from Christmas recording sessions, and some supplemented with Christmas themed BBC recordings. A portion of one song recorded for the 1967 Christmas flexi disc, "Christmas Time (Is Here Again)", was officially released as an additional track on the 1995 "Free as a Bird" single. Part of the 1963 track is featured as an unlockable special feature on The Beatles: Rock Band. In 2017, Apple released The Christmas Records as a box set of seven 7" 45 rpm records pressed on coloured vinyl in replica sleeves.

=== The Beatles (Esher) demos (1968) ===
In May 1968, the Beatles met at Kinfauns, the Esher home of George Harrison, to review and record demos of songs under consideration for their next album; 27 songs, mostly acoustic, have become public from this session. Seven of these songs were released on Anthology 3, including "Junk", a song McCartney would later record for his first solo album. Of the 20 demo songs not officially released, 15 would be recorded and released on The Beatles, while "Not Guilty" and "What's the New Mary Jane" would be recorded for the album but not make the final line-up. The recordings included on the Anthology series were of a significantly higher fidelity (they came from George's original stereo reels of the demo sessions, and processed at Abbey Road Studios) than the bootlegged recordings (which probably came from John's mono copy of the tapes), raising the possibility that there were higher-quality versions of all 27 songs. In 2018, all 27 original Esher demos were released in high-quality as part of the deluxe 50th Anniversary reissue of The Beatles, taken from Harrison's original 4-track master tapes. Giles Martin described the tapes as: "To me, it is like the Beatles unplugged. These are demos but they are good: they double-tracked themselves".

Three additional songs would never be recorded in the studio by the Beatles:

- "Child of Nature", later released by Lennon, with different lyrics, as "Jealous Guy" on Imagine.
- "Circles", released by Harrison on his 1982 album Gone Troppo.
- "Sour Milk Sea", a Harrison song reworked and given to Jackie Lomax and released in August 1968 as one of the first Apple Records singles.

=== Get Back / Let It Be sessions (1969) ===
In January 1969, the Beatles got together with director Michael Lindsay-Hogg to film the rehearsals for the group's proposed first live concert since 1966. This project would concentrate on new material, and was intended to form the basis for both a television documentary and a new album, which were given the title of Get Back. But disagreements and a general lack of enthusiasm within the group led to much of the project never being fully completed. However, a one-off live performance was filmed and recorded on the rooftop of Apple Records on 30 January 1969, and the title song "Get Back" was released as a single in April 1969. After essentially being abandoned by the Beatles for more than a year, the project was eventually renamed and released in May 1970; with the film footage now becoming a feature film, Let It Be, and the new songs becoming an album of the same name.

The rehearsals and recordings took place at Twickenham Film Studios (2–16 January) and then at Apple (20–31 January), with more than one hundred hours captured on film and the corresponding Nagra tape recorders used for the film's audio track. These Nagra tapes are the source for most, but not all, of the bootlegs from these sessions. In addition to songs that would later be released by the group, the Beatles played hundreds of cover versions and original compositions. However, many of the performances were brief (some lasting less than ten seconds), and many of the original compositions are undeveloped ideas or improvisations that have been described as the audio equivalent of doodling. A sampling of the rehearsals was officially issued as a bonus disc with Let It Be... Naked.

Among the more complete rehearsed songs that have been featured on bootlegs are "Watching Rainbows", "Commonwealth", Suzy's Parlour (published under the name Suzy Parker), and "The Palace of the King of the Birds" (later recorded but not released by McCartney as "Castle of the King of the Birds"); "All Things Must Pass", "Let It Down", "Isn't It a Pity" and "Hear Me Lord", later released by Harrison; "Gimme Some Truth" and "Oh My Love", later released by Lennon; and "Teddy Boy" and "Hot as Sun", later released by McCartney.

Portions of the rooftop concert were seen in the Let It Be film and the Anthology documentary, and three tracks were used for the Let It Be album, while the complete recording has been bootlegged. The performance consisted of a short take of "Get Back" played as part of the preliminary sound check, "Get Back" (first and second versions), "Don't Let Me Down", "I've Got a Feeling", "One After 909", "Dig a Pony", "God Save the Queen" (a brief version played while the audio tape reel was changed), "I've Got a Feeling" (second version), "Don't Let Me Down" (second version), and "Get Back" (third version).

On 30 January 1969, Glyn Johns compiled some performances he had been mixing, and made acetate copies for the Beatles. In addition to songs that would eventually appear on Let It Be, this set included "Teddy Boy", "The Walk", by Jimmy McCracklin, and a rock and roll medley that included songs such as "I'm Ready", an early Fats Domino song, and "Shake Rattle and Roll", by Big Joe Turner. This was the first version that leaked out and broadcast on multiple radio stations starting in September 1969, and formed the basis for the bootleg Kum Back that appeared near the end of 1969. Johns started working in earnest on compiling an album in March 1969, and a test acetate from this period eventually surfaced on a poor quality bootleg called "O.P.D"..

Johns later made two "official" attempts at compiling the Get Back album, with both versions widely bootlegged. The 28 May 1969 compilation by Johns contained the following line-up: "One After 909", "Rocker", "Save the Last Dance for Me", "Don't Let Me Down", "Dig a Pony", "I've Got a Feeling", "Get Back", "For You Blue", "Teddy Boy", "Two of Us", "Maggie Mae", "Dig It", "Let It Be", "The Long and Winding Road", and "Get Back (Reprise)". The main changes made for the 5 January 1970 compilation were the removal of "Teddy Boy" and the additions of "I Me Mine" and "Across the Universe".

One of the myriad Get Back session compilation bootlegs was The Black Album, a three-LP set from the 1980s in a memorable package (although the material has since been bootlegged in superior sound quality). In the early 2000s, Yellow Dog Records created Day by Day, a 38-part CD series containing almost all of the "Camera A" Nagra tape recordings, with improved audio quality compared to earlier releases. Around the same time, the bootleg label Unicorn started releasing the "Camera B" tapes, in other smaller CD series, such as Twelve Days at Twickenham. In January 2003, nearly 500 (with 40 still missing as of December 2022) of the original Nagra tapes were recovered by police in England and the Netherlands, with five people arrested.

Even after the raid, bootlegging of the material continued. In 2004, the Purple Chick label released A/B Road, an 81-CD set compiling all of the Nagra material leaked by that time (albeit with a few flaws), and by 2008, every available Nagra tape recording was shared in one way or another.

=== Studio album needle drops ===
Starting in 1987, Apple began officially reissuing the Beatles catalogue on CD. However, as digital remastering was still in its infancy, many fans and audiophiles were disappointed with the sound quality of the official reissues, preferring the "warmth" of the vinyl releases. Many fans also clamoured for the digital release of the original Beatles Capitol albums as they contained many unique mixes different from the UK releases. Several bootleggers stepped in to fill this void by offering digital copies of their own needle drops of the entire Beatles catalogue, typically using premium vinyl pressings played and digitised with high-end audio equipment. While these unauthorized copies are not bootlegs as commonly defined, their creation and distribution channels overlap with bootleg products.

Some of the widely distributed collections are the BEAT/Red Robin, Dr. Ebbetts, and Millennium Remasters series and the Beatles' remasters on DLH Records. The official remastering of the Beatles' catalogue in stereo and mono, released by Apple in September 2009 on both CD and vinyl, has largely made these bootleg remasters obsolete; however, collectors in search of authentic original (and in some cases unique) mixes still find them of historical interest. The Beatles' official catalogue of their original stereo studio albums has since been issued via digital download through iTunes.

== Material not bootlegged ==
A considerable amount of additional never-circulated Beatles material is believed to exist, either in private possession or studio vaults, as mentioned in documents and recollections.

From the group's early years, it has been reported that additional songs exist from the 1960 Quarrymen rehearsal tapes, including a Lennon–McCartney instrumental "Winston's Walk" and early versions of "When I'm Sixty-Four" and "Ask Me Why". Another recording of considerable interest is a tape of 18 songs from a Beatles show in mid-1962 at the Cavern Club, recorded from the audience. The tape includes several cover versions of songs not available elsewhere by the Beatles, including the Bruce Channel number one "Hey! Baby", James Ray's "If You Gotta Make a Fool of Somebody", and the Bobby Vee hit "Sharing You". McCartney bought the tape at a 1985 auction, and since none of it was used for Anthology, it has been assumed to be of poor sound quality.

Many demo recordings are known to have been made by the individual Beatles but have yet to become public. Lennon's uncirculated demos include "Do You Want to Know a Secret", "I Call Your Name", "No Reply" (pre-dating the one on Anthology), "In My Life", and "Good Night". McCartney's uncirculated demos include "A World Without Love", "It's for You", "What Goes On", "Eleanor Rigby", "Etcetera" (a 1968 song intended for Marianne Faithfull), and "The Long and Winding Road". However, a small portion of "World Without Love" made its public debut in January 2013 during a series of Peter Asher concerts and has subsequently appeared in full elsewhere. Also the Daily Express announced, on 20 July 2016, the original acetate of "It's for You" demo featuring Paul's voice (it was discovered among other demos in Cilla Black's collection and was proposed for auction). Portions of these two demos, "A World Without Love" and "It's for You", were made available on Beatles bootleg The Lost Album in 2017. (Note: As part of the 2:13 track "I'm in Love". CD 4 track 18)

Between the official Anthology releases and the numerous outtakes that have been bootlegged, many of the Beatles' most interesting studio recordings are available in some form. Nevertheless, there are still recordings known to be in EMI's archives that have generated particular interest in their eventual release. One is "Carnival of Light", an improvised 14-minute vocal and sound collage that the Beatles created in early 1967 for an art festival; the recording was under consideration for Anthology, and McCartney has been an advocate for its release. Another is take 3 of "Helter Skelter" from 18 July 1968, renowned for its length of twenty-seven minutes. Anthology 3 included only a 4:38 edit of the 12:35 take 2 from that day's work on the song; asked why a longer version wasn't issued, George Martin explained: "I think it gets boring." The full 12 minutes of take 2 were eventually released in 2018 for the 50th anniversary of The Beatles.

Some recordings may no longer exist, if they ever existed originally. A Quarrymen rehearsal that was recorded at Colin Hanton's home was taped over. BBC documentation shows that "Sheila" and two versions of "Three Cool Cats" were recorded and never broadcast, but the tapes were likely reused or discarded, a fate shared by some of the Beatles' studio session tapes prior to late 1963. Carl Perkins said that he joined the Beatles in the studio for a late night jam session on 1 June 1964, but this was probably not taped. Several Lennon–McCartney titles were mentioned in a 1960 letter from McCartney, including "Looking Glass", "Years Roll Along", and "Keep Looking That Way", but there is no evidence that tapes were ever made of those songs during rehearsals from that era.

One final source of uncirculated recordings is the set of sessions held in 1994–1995 for the Anthology project. In addition to the two songs released, two other Lennon demos (which have been bootlegged) became the basis for additional work by the other three Beatles: "Now and Then" and "Grow Old with Me". "Now and Then" was close to being the third new song for Anthology, but it needed more work than the two released songs and was left unfinished; McCartney indicated an interest in completing the song with Starr. A new song composed by McCartney and Harrison, "All for Love", was also reportedly recorded by the three ex-Beatles at the sessions but never finished. While a selection of recordings from the sessions have been bootlegged, no recordings of "All for Love" are known to be available. Starr released a version of "Grow Old with Me" in 2019 with McCartney on bass and backing vocals, while "Now and Then" was later released on 2 November 2023, with AI demixing technology utilized to isolate Lennon's vocals.

== Fake or disputed bootleg songs ==
A number of songs have been incorrectly claimed by bootleggers to be unreleased Beatles songs.

A few "outfakes" have been labelled as Beatles tracks many times:

- "Have You Heard the Word". This song was credited to the Fut, and it was rumoured to include some of the Beatles playing with some of the Bee Gees. The actual participants in the 1969 recording were Maurice Gibb, the duo Tin Tin, and Billy Laurie. The recording was so plausible as a Lennon song that Yoko Ono tried to copyright its lyrics as a Lennon composition after his death.
- "The L.S. Bumble Bee". Peter Cook and Dudley Moore combined psychedelic music with lyrics spoofing LSD. It was rumoured that Lennon was somehow involved, perhaps as a rebuttal to the controversy about possible drug references in songs like "Lucy in the Sky with Diamonds", but Moore has denied this; the song actually predates Sgt. Pepper, having been released in January 1967.
- "Peace of Mind / The Candle Burns". The song was reportedly found in the Apple trash in 1970, but the true origin is still unknown. Some claim it to be an actual Beatles home demo from around 1967, though the lack of any corroborating evidence and the unfamiliar voices on the record have left Beatles experts convinced that it too is a fake.
- "Colliding Circles", "Left Is Right (and Right Is Wrong)", "Pink Litmus Paper Shirt" and "Deck Chair". In 1971, humorist Martin Lewis compiled a Beatles bootleg discography for Disc magazine, inserting four song titles he'd simply made up: the John Lennon polemic "Left Is Right (And Right Is Wrong)," George Harrison's "Pink Litmus Paper Shirt," a Paul McCartney vaudeville-style number "Deck Chair," and another supposed Lennon track, "Colliding Circles". These spurious tunes were then picked up by other compilers who have continued to propagate them ever since, despite the complete lack of any evidence for their existence. (Outsider musician R. Stevie Moore has since written and recorded tunes entitled "Pink Litmus Paper Shirt" and "Colliding Circles", making them real songs—just not real Beatles songs. In addition, the Brittles, a Beatles pastiche band, has recorded "Left Is Right (and Right Is Wrong)" and "Deck Chair". Musician Neil Innes, a Bonzo Dog Band member and Monty Python associate/friend of Martin Lewis, incorporated all four bogus song titles into the song "Unfinished Words", recorded by the Rutles, and released on their album Archaeology.

== See also ==
- The Beatles' recording sessions
- Unreleased Lennon–McCartney songs
