= The Beatles at Abbey Road =

1983 multimedia presentation

Abbey Road Studios' promotional flyer for the presentation

The Beatles at Abbey Road was a multimedia presentation hosted by Abbey Road Studios in London that focused on the recording career of the Beatles. It took place from 18 July to 11 September 1983, while part of the studios were undergoing renovation. The programme included a guided tour of Abbey Road's Studio 2, where the Beatles recorded most of their music for EMI in the 1960s; a two-part video presentation narrated by disc jockey Roger Scott, with interviews and rare archival footage; and previously unheard outtakes from the band's recording sessions. The event was hosted by studio manager Ken Townsend and the shows took place three times a day. Its staging reflected the elevation of Abbey Road (formerly EMI Studios) to the level of an English cultural location, as well as the enduring popularity of the Beatles, more than ten years after their break-up. The Beatles at Abbey Road was a commercial success, with 22,000 tickets sold.

The program marked the first time that the studios had been opened to the public, and was announced by EMI in June 1983. Visitors were offered the chance to experience Studio 2 as the Beatles used to work in it, with microphones and other equipment set up to replicate a typical recording session. Among the songs aired during the presentation were the band's unreleased versions of "How Do You Do It?" and "Leave My Kitten Alone".

Former Beatle Paul McCartney joined the audience at one of the shows and was said to have enjoyed the experience. At his suggestion, George Harrison and Ringo Starr also visited, although they attended a private presentation. According to EMI, Harrison was delighted to hear his initial solo take of "While My Guitar Gently Weeps", from July 1968, and told the company that he would be happy to have the recording released immediately.

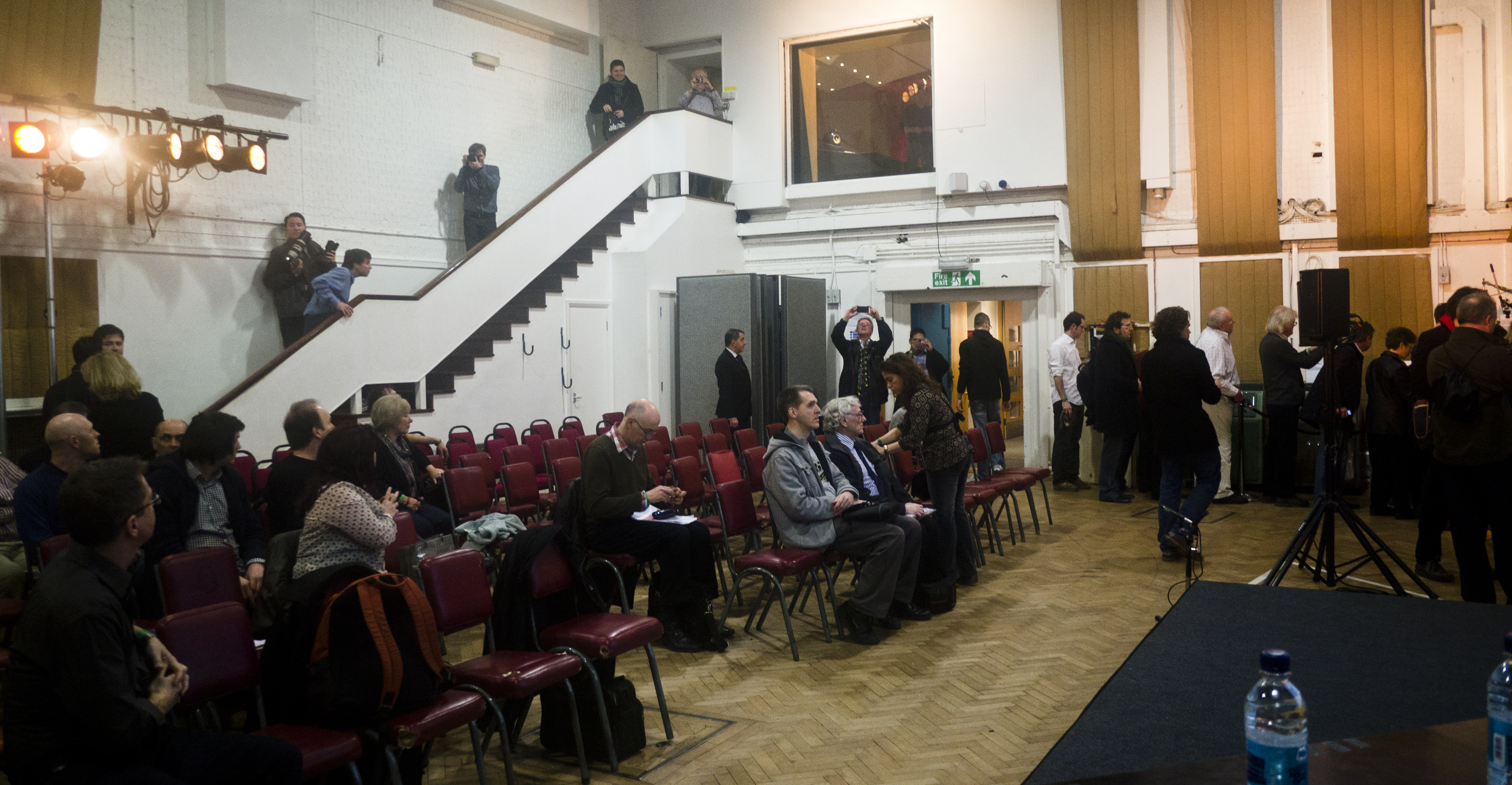
Abbey Road Studio 2, pictured during a subsequent opening to the public, in March 2012

Recordings made surreptitiously by some visitors to the 1983 show soon became available on bootleg albums. A year after The Beatles at Abbey Road, the songs that had been unearthed for the presentation were remixed for a planned album, titled Sessions. The former Beatles initiated legal proceedings to prevent EMI from issuing the album, however, saying that the work was substandard. Sessions was scheduled for release in November 1984, but the release was cancelled.

The interest in these previously unissued recordings nevertheless confirmed that a collection of Beatles studio outtakes was a viable option. The songs were instead included on the three outtakes albums that formed part of the Beatles Anthology project in 1995–96.
