= Not Guilty (song) =

Song by George Harrison

Song by George Harrison

from the album George Harrison
- Released: 20 February 1979
- Recorded: April–October 1978
- Genre: Jazz-pop
- Length: 3:35
- Label: Dark Horse
- Songwriter: George Harrison
- Producers: George Harrison, Russ Titelman

George Harrison track listing
- 10 tracks Side one: 1. "Love Comes to Everyone"; 2. "Not Guilty"; 3. "Here Comes the Moon"; 4. "Soft-Hearted Hana"; 5. "Blow Away"; Side two: 6. "Faster"; 7. "Dark Sweet Lady"; 8. "Your Love Is Forever"; 9. "Soft Touch"; 10. "If You Believe"

"Not Guilty"

Song by the Beatles

from the album Anthology 3
- Released: 28 October 1996
- Recorded: 8–9, 12 August 1968
- Studio: EMI, London
- Genre: Psychedelic rock
- Length: 3:22; 4:28 (unedited length)
- Label: Apple
- Songwriter: George Harrison
- Producer: George Martin

"Not Guilty" is a song by English rock musician George Harrison from his 1979 album George Harrison. He wrote the song in 1968 following the Beatles' Transcendental Meditation course in India with Maharishi Mahesh Yogi, an activity that he had led the group into undertaking. The lyrics serve as a response to the recrimination Harrison received from his bandmates John Lennon and Paul McCartney in the aftermath to the group's public falling out with the Maharishi, and as the Beatles launched their multimedia company Apple Corps. The band recorded the song amid the tensions that characterised the sessions for their 1968 double LP The Beatles (also known as the "White Album"). The track was completed in August 1968 but not included on the release.

Harrison revisited "Not Guilty" in early 1978, shortly after participating in the Rutles' television satire of the Beatles' history, All You Need Is Cash. In contrast to the atmosphere surrounding the song's creation, this period was one of personal contentment for Harrison, who enjoyed the opportunity to debunk the myths surrounding his former band. The musical arrangement similarly differs in mood from the 1968 version; where the latter features distorted electric guitars and harpsichord, Harrison's version reflects his adoption of a mellow jazz-pop style. The other musicians on the recording include Neil Larsen and Willie Weeks.

"Not Guilty" was known to be a Beatles outtake but the song was unheard by the public until the release of Harrison's 1979 album. The Beatles' version continued to be the subject of speculation among collectors. An edit of the band's recording was prepared for the aborted Sessions album in 1984 and became available on bootlegs before its official release on the Beatles' Anthology 3 outtakes compilation in 1996. The full version of the track, together with Harrison's May 1968 demo of the song, appears on the 50th Anniversary Edition box-set release of The Beatles.

== Background and inspiration ==
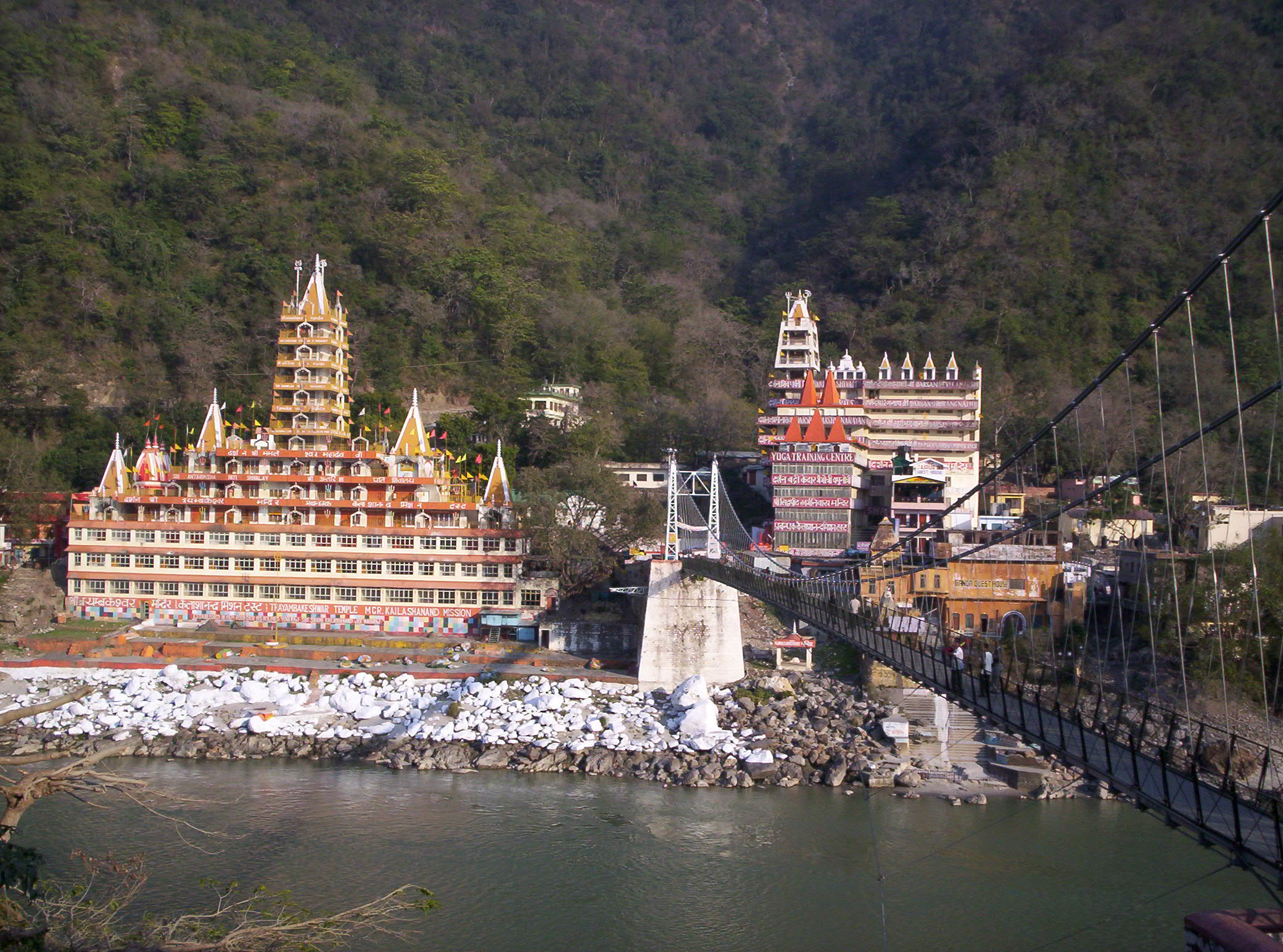
View of Rishikesh and the Ganges. When writing "Not Guilty", Harrison addressed the divisive atmosphere within the Beatles following their return from India in 1968.

George Harrison wrote "Not Guilty" in 1968 following the Beatles' highly publicised spiritual retreat in Rishikesh, India, where they studied Transcendental Meditation under Maharishi Mahesh Yogi. Harrison had led the Beatles' interest in meditation and Indian culture, influencing their audience and musical peers, but the band's falling out with the Maharishi in April 1968 became the source of public embarrassment. Ringo Starr and Paul McCartney had each left the ashram early and returned to England, with McCartney more interested in attending to the band's new Apple Corps business venture. Harrison and John Lennon stayed on, only to then depart hurriedly after hearing of alleged impropriety between the Maharishi and a female student. The Rishikesh sojourn was the Beatles' last extracurricular activity as a group and was followed by a divergence of opinion between Lennon, McCartney and Harrison that lasted until the band's break-up in April 1970. In his 1980 autobiography, I, Me, Mine, Harrison says that "Not Guilty" addresses "Paul-John-Apple-Rishikesh-Indian friends, etc."

Rather than return to England with Lennon, Harrison extended his time away by visiting his mentor Ravi Shankar in Madras. When he returned to London in late April, according to Apple press officer Derek Taylor, Harrison "reacted with real horror" at the extravagance of Apple's operation. The company had taken out print advertisements inviting any budding artist to submit their creative ideas. The London offices were inundated with submissions, almost all of which were ignored, along with crowds of eccentrics responding to the Beatles' invitation. (Note: Lennon and McCartney added to the chaos by repeating their offer on American television in May. According to Harrison in an interview late that year, Lennon and McCartney acknowledged that this method of promoting the company had been a bad idea.) In a 1987 interview with Timothy White for Musician magazine, Harrison referred to "the grief I was catching" from Lennon and McCartney post-India. He explained the message behind the song: "I said I wasn't guilty of getting in the way of their career. I said I wasn't guilty of leading them astray in our going to Rishikesh to see the Maharishi. I was sticking up for myself …"

The Rishikesh sojourn also resulted in Harrison's emergence as a prolific songwriter. "Not Guilty" was one of several guitar-based compositions from this period, coinciding with Harrison's re-engagement with his main instrument after two years of dedicated sitar study under Shankar. The full extent of this productivity was hidden until his 1970 solo album, All Things Must Pass, however, as Lennon and McCartney continued to dominate the Beatles' songwriting. In author Peter Doggett's description, the band's stay in Rishikesh marked the end of a period when Harrison's championing of Indian culture had guided the Beatles' musical and philosophical direction. He adds that the "old balance of power was uneasily resumed", as Harrison had to push to have his songs included on the group's albums, and Lennon, further to their self-produced 1967 TV film Magical Mystery Tour, continued to resent McCartney's attempts to manage their career.

== Composition ==
The key of "Not Guilty" is E minor. It contains combined verse and choruses; each of the three verse-chorus sections begins and ends with the song's title phrase. The composition includes a guitar riff that author Alan Clayson views as distinctive and "low-down", and closes with an instrumental coda. It also features syncopation, half-bars, and, on the Beatles recording, a guitar solo followed by a change in time signature from 4/4 to six bars in 3/8.

Musicologist Walter Everett highlights the song's musical form as an example of "the composer's typically outlandish chord juxtapositions", which in this case reveals "a new level of sophistication similar to jazz methodology". He says that while E minor is the main key, A minor is tonicised in the start of the verses and is further suggested with a surprising G–Dm8–Dm7–E7 chord sequence. Following the final chord in that sequence, he hears the Gm chord as "confident and loudly protesting", and contextually derived via an "unprecedented use of mixture from the Phrygian mode (thus the chord's B♭ [note]) into A pentatonic minor". (Note: Everett concludes that the song would most likely have impressed European composers Hugo Wolf and Max Reger.)

"Not Guilty" follows Harrison's 1967 song "Only a Northern Song" as a statement of his dissatisfaction in the Beatles. Everett describes the lyrics as a "defense against the tyranny of his songwriting comrades". Harrison refers to his bandmates as seeking to "steal the day"; he recognises his place and vows not to "[get] underneath your feet". In the third verse, he promises not to "upset the Apple cart", as "I only want what I can get". With regard to Rishikesh and the Maharishi, he denies any responsibility for the others' disappointment with the experience. He denies leading the group "astray on the road to Mandalay" and "making friends with every Sikh".

== Beatles version ==
=== Esher demo ===
In May 1968, Harrison taped an acoustic demo of the song at his home, Kinfauns in Esher. This and other demos of the band's new material were part of their preparation for recording the double LP The Beatles, also known as the "White Album". On the tapes, the song follows a group performance of Harrison's tribute to meditation, "Sour Milk Sea", after which he refers to "Not Guilty" as "a jazz number" that would make "a good rocker". Having long been available on bootleg compilations, the Esher demo was issued in 2018 on the White Album's 50th Anniversary box set.

=== Studio recording ===
==== Basic track ====
The Beatles recorded "Not Guilty" at EMI Studios (now Abbey Road Studios) in London in August 1968. The recording was produced by George Martin and engineered by Ken Scott. The song was difficult to learn due to its time signature changes. During the first 18 takes on 7 August, the band focused only on the introduction, before going on to tape a further 27 takes that night. On 8 August, they first attended to a technical problem on the recording of their forthcoming single, "Hey Jude", and then resumed work on "Not Guilty". The group recorded a total of 101 takes over the two sessions, although only 21 of these attempts were complete performances, before settling on take 99 as a satisfactory basic track.

Initial takes included keyboard accompaniment from an electric piano, but this was replaced by a harpsichord for the 8 August session. The instruments used on the basic track were therefore electric guitar, harpsichord, bass and drums. Although author Ian MacDonald says Harrison or Lennon played the harpsichord part, Everett credits Lennon, who also played the instrument on "All You Need Is Love" the previous year. (Note: In his study of the Beatles' recordings, John Winn says the harpsichord was "probably" played by Chris Thomas, Martin's understudy. In a 2018 interview, Thomas recalls playing harpsichord on Harrison's "Piggies", among several keyboard contributions he made to the White Album from September 1968 onwards; when asked about "Not Guilty", he states that he did not play on the song.) The recording marked the first time that Harrison used his Gibson Les Paul guitar known as "Lucy", which was a gift from his friend Eric Clapton.

==== Overdubs ====
The band recorded overdubs onto take 99 on 9 August, with Starr adding further drums and McCartney augmenting his bass part. Much of the six-and-a-half-hour session was dedicated to Harrison's lead guitar part; for this, he chose to play in the control room while his amplifier was recorded in an echo chamber. On 12 August, Harrison overdubbed his lead vocal, trying different areas of the studio in an effort to achieve the sound he was after. He again settled on the control room with, in Scott's description, "everything coming back through the speakers to give it more of a live theater-type feel or club feel". Lennon and McCartney experimented with harmony vocals on some parts of the song, but Harrison was unsatisfied. Scott told journalist Marshall Terrill in 2012 that the recording was problematic because "George wasn't feeling it. It was his song and he wasn't feeling it. He could not get a vocal that he was happy with. He couldn't get even into sort of the mood of singing it, that's why we tried different ways of him singing it …" (Note: The unusual setting for Harrison's vocal overdub inspired Lennon to suggest the band record their next song, "Yer Blues", in the tiny room off from the studio control room.)

Harrison then spent more time recording guitar at live performance levels. A mono mix, titled RM1, of the completed track was carried out that same day. In the description of Guitar World's editors, Harrison's playing on the song has a "sinewy" quality and a "sizzling tone" made more effective by being performed at full volume. Author Simon Leng writes that the recording "might have passed for grunge", with its "phased vocals and ... pseudo-harpsichord under attack from George's heavily distorted guitars and fierce riff". He adds that the lead guitar is "spiky-rough in a way Harrison would rarely approach again". Following his pioneering backwards-recorded guitar solo on "I'm Only Sleeping", in 1966, Harrison's use of reverse echo-chamber effect on "Not Guilty" marked the last time the Beatles used backwards audio on one of their recordings.

MacDonald cites "Not Guilty" as an example of how Harrison's contributions to the White Album were "stymied" by the divisive atmosphere that characterised the sessions, which included a lack of collaboration between the band members. After Harrison departed for a short holiday in Greece, the other Beatles resumed recording on 20 August with tensions running high; Lennon and Starr completed overdubs on "Yer Blues" in one studio while McCartney recorded "Mother Nature's Son" alone in another. Two days later, by which point Harrison had returned to London, the acrimony that had been building within the group led to Starr walking out, intent on quitting the Beatles.

=== Exclusion from the White Album ===
According to Everett, "Not Guilty" was one of the last songs to be cut from the final running order of The Beatles. When announcing the release on 26 October, the NME listed "Not Guilty" among the possible tracks; Mal Evans, the Beatles' longtime aide, then wrote in the band's official fan magazine that it would not appear on the double album. Lennon admired the composition initially, but in Leng's view, with its "barbs about the Beatles", the song "was just a little too candid in airing the band's dirty laundry". (Note: The problems in Apple Corps' design were already evident to the public, since the band had closed their Apple Boutique in late July and had given away all the stock. In the early hours of 8 August, following the first session for "Not Guilty", McCartney and his girlfriend had written the titles of "Hey Jude" and "Revolution" on the whitewashed windows of the empty shop, to promote the Beatles' next single.) Music journalist Mikal Gilmore similarly says that its exclusion was "perhaps because it was apparent to everybody that Harrison had aimed the song at Lennon and McCartney".

In its three-part study of the 1968 double album, in 2008, Goldmine magazine commented that the song's exclusion has long been one of the points of debate regarding the White Album. The writers said that some listeners find the content of the set "exquisitely balanced", while others contend that the Beatles "really should have added 'Not Guilty' to the brew". Increasingly marginalised from the Beatles' creative decision-making in 1968, Martin had favoured paring down the double LP to a single disc. Everett offers a 15-song running order in keeping with the producer's typical "preferences and constraints", in which he contends that Martin would have selected "Not Guilty", along with the Harrison compositions "While My Guitar Gently Weeps" and "Long, Long, Long".

The final take, numbered 102 (a reduction mix of take 99), was edited and remixed by Geoff Emerick in 1984 for the aborted Sessions album. After Harrison and McCartney filed affidavits criticising the "quality of the work", one of EMI's in-house cassettes of the Sessions recordings found its way to bootleggers, resulting in the Ultra Rare Trax bootlegs. "Not Guilty" appeared on the third volume in the Ultra Rare Trax series. It was officially released on Apple's outtakes compilation Anthology 3 in October 1996. Author and critic Richie Unterberger describes the Anthology 3 version of "Not Guilty" as a "bastardization" due to the editing out of a mid-song guitar solo and other features from the 1968 stereo mix. He adds that this treatment is "more roundly castigated than almost any other of the Anthology reconstructions". (Note: Beatles author John Winn also criticises Emerick's work, describing it as a "mangled mix" with inconsistent sound and several "superfluous edits".) The unedited version of the track appears on the 50th Anniversary box set of the White Album.

== George Harrison recording ==
According to author Robert Rodriguez, "Not Guilty" was "much-fabled" among Beatles fans by the late 1970s, since the song was known as a White Album outtake but had never been heard publicly. (Note: As a result, some bootleg compilers had taken "Frenzy and Distortion", a track that Harrison produced for Shankar's Raga soundtrack album in 1971, and retitled it "Not Guilty" for inclusion on collections of the Beatles' rare recordings.) In their respective books on the Beatles published at that time, Nicholas Schaffner paired it with Lennon's "What's the New Mary Jane" as completed recordings that were known to have been left off the White Album, while Harry Castleman and Walter Podrazik wrote that, as far as collectors were aware, Harrison had taped "Not Guilty" with Clapton in summer 1968 before the Beatles attempted to record the song in March 1969.

In early 1978, while gathering song manuscripts for I, Me, Mine, Harrison rediscovered his Kinfauns demo of "Not Guilty". He decided to record the song again for what became his 1979 album George Harrison. At this time, he also revisited "Circles", another song he had demoed in Esher before the Beatles began recording the White Album, and he wrote "Here Comes the Moon" as a sequel to his 1969 Abbey Road composition "Here Comes the Sun".

The sessions took place between April and October 1978, (Note: In I, Me Mine, Harrison's handwritten lyrics for the song are reproduced on Dark Horse Records notepaper and dated May 1978.) and coincided with a period of domestic contentment for Harrison, during which he married his partner Olivia Arias and become a father for the first time, to son Dhani. In addition, Harrison had enjoyed participating in the Rutles' recent spoof of the Beatles' history, All You Need Is Cash, a film project that allowed him to debunk the myths that surrounded his former band. (Note: As well as appearing briefly in the television film, Harrison acted as a consultant to its creators, Neil Innes and Eric Idle. He also supplied them with archival footage from the Beatles' long-planned documentary project, which eventually aired as The Beatles Anthology in 1995.) Harrison allowed his spiritual preoccupations to be satirised in the film as, following the Rutles' break-up, his character, Stig O'Hara, withdraws from the limelight to become a female flight attendant with Air India. Building on his reputation as the "Quiet Beatle", the identity of the alleged dead band member in the Paul is dead conspiracy theory was transferred to Stig, as the clues include the fact that he had not spoken since 1966. (Note: The film also sends up Apple's chaotic operation. In one scene, employees pillage the Rutle Corps headquarters while the company's press agent is interviewed by a reporter, played by Harrison.)

Harrison recorded "Not Guilty" at his home studio, FPSHOT, in Henley, Oxfordshire, with Neil Larsen, Stevie Winwood, Willie Weeks and Andy Newmark among the backing musicians. Larsen played Rhodes piano, which serves as the main feature of the track, while Harrison exchanged the electric guitar arrangement from 1968 with acoustic parts. The recording also omits the section in 3/8 time, which had caused difficulty during the Beatles' attempts ten years before. Its mellow jazz arrangement ends with interplay between Harrison's scat singing and Weeks's bass. George Harrison was scheduled for release in December but an issue with the artwork delayed the process. On 15 December, Harrison accompanied Starr to the re-opening of the Star-Club in Hamburg, where the Beatles had regularly performed before achieving fame in 1963.

Harrison produced the track with Russ Titelman, a Warner Bros. Records staff producer whose other projects included the self-titled debut album by Rickie Lee Jones. Leng views Harrison's remake as typical of the singer's frame of mind on George Harrison, writing: "In complete contrast [to the Beatles' version], the 1979 reproduction is all shimmering cool and acoustic sea spray – here is a man looking back on events rather than being caught up in their heat." Leng describes the musical mood on the track as "a loose version of the Rickie Lee Jones or Paul Simon jazz-pop sound, dominated by phased electric piano and breathy vocals".

== Release and reception ==
We recorded it [in 1968] but we didn't get it down right or something ... The lyrics are a bit passé – all about upsetting "Apple carts" and stuff – but it's a bit about what was happening at the time ... the Maharishi and going to the Himalayas and all that was said about that. I like the tune a lot; it would make a great tune for Peggy Lee or someone.

— George Harrison to Rolling Stone, 1979

George Harrison was released on Dark Horse Records on 20 February 1979. "Not Guilty" appeared as the second track, sequenced between with "Love Comes to Everyone" and "Here Comes the Moon". The song was of particular interest to Harrison's audience, due to its reputation as a lost Beatles track. Harrison carried out limited promotion for the album, during which the speculation surrounding a possible Beatles reunion was a regular theme put forward by members of the media. At his press conference in Los Angeles, he suggested the former bandmates could meet for a cup of tea and televise the proceedings via satellite. He also denied that "Not Guilty" was aimed purely at McCartney, saying: "No, it's just about that period in 1968 ... there's a lot of comedy in it. You just have to look for it." (Note: In an interview he gave to Rolling Stone to promote the album, in February, Harrison mentioned he had spent the morning in a London recording studio with McCartney, but he was quick to add that it was merely a social meeting. Mick Brown, the magazine's writer, said the chances of a "musical realignment" between the four former Beatles was "as unlikely as Richard Nixon regaining the presidency".)

Peter Doggett writes that, in the context of its release, eleven years after the events of 1968, the song "gently satirised the global obsession with the past, and specifically the era that the Beatles allegedly epitomised". Doggett adds that although Harrison distanced himself from Beatles nostalgia in his promotional activities, he shared the public's interest in what Lennon might be doing during the latter's fourth year as a house-husband and stay-at-home father. In his Rolling Stone interview at this time, Harrison commented that he had not seen Lennon in the last two years and, after the recent changes in his own life, he understood his former bandmate's decision to remain out of the limelight. (Note: Harrison said that the pair kept in touch with postcards and, alluding to the Rutles, "tapping on the table". He added: "But I myself would be interested to know whether John still writes tunes and puts them on a cassette, or does he just forget about music and not touch the guitar. Because that's what I did, all of 1977 ... And I didn't miss it.")

The album received favourable reviews, particularly in the UK, where it was Harrison's best-received work since the early 1970s. Harry George of the NME welcomed the inclusion of "Not Guilty", saying "No Beatle who could take part in All You Need Is Cash can be all bad", and assumed that the reference to upsetting the "Apple cart" was a line from the Rutles. (Note: When asked in a 2001 online Q&A how the Rutles had "influenced your career", Harrison responded: "I got all my ideas from the Rutles! Particularly, the 12-string Rickenbacker and slide guitar styles I got from Stig O'Hara.") He described the song as a "tense soft-shoe shuffle", highlighting Larsen's electric piano, Weeks's "serpentine bass", and Harrison lyrics that offered "wit and composure" rather than "the whining defensiveness of yore". Writing in Melody Maker in 1979, E.J. Thribb also approved of Harrison's openness to being the target of Eric Idle's satire in the Rutles film. He named "Not Guilty" among the album's three most enjoyable songs, along with "Love Comes to Everyone" and "Blow Away", saying: "The chords roll and tumble, the melodies are good to chant, and the lyrics are simple but tell their story."

== Personnel ==
=== Beatles version ===
According to Walter Everett:

- George Harrison – vocals, lead and rhythm guitars
- John Lennon – harpsichord
- Paul McCartney – bass
- Ringo Starr – drums

=== George Harrison version ===
According to Simon Leng:

- George Harrison – vocals, acoustic guitars
- Neil Larsen – electric piano
- Steve Winwood – keyboards
- Willie Weeks – bass
- Andy Newmark – drums
- Ray Cooper – conga

== Sources ==
- Babiuk, Andy (2002). Beatles Gear: All the Fab Four's Instruments, from Stage to Studio. San Francisco, CA: Backbeat Books. ISBN 978-0-87930-731-8.
- Badman, Keith (2001). The Beatles Diary Volume 2: After the Break-Up 1970–2001. London: Omnibus Press. ISBN 978-0-7119-8307-6.
- Brend, Mark (2005). Strange Sounds: Offbeat Instruments and Sonic Experiments in Pop. San Francisco, CA: Backbeat Books. ISBN 9-780879-308551.
- Castleman, Harry; Podrazik, Walter J. (1976). All Together Now: The First Complete Beatles Discography 1961–1975. New York, NY: Ballantine Books. ISBN 0-345-25680-8.
- Clayson, Alan (2003). George Harrison. London: Sanctuary. ISBN 1-86074-489-3.
- Doggett, Peter (2011). You Never Give Me Your Money: The Beatles After the Breakup. New York, NY: It Books. ISBN 978-0-06-177418-8.
- The Editors of Rolling Stone (2002). Harrison. New York, NY: Rolling Stone Press. ISBN 978-0-7432-3581-5.
- Everett, Walter (1999). The Beatles as Musicians: Revolver Through the Anthology. New York, NY: Oxford University Press. ISBN 0-19-512941-5.
- Gould, Jonathan (2007). Can't Buy Me Love: The Beatles, Britain and America. London: Piatkus. ISBN 978-0-7499-2988-6.
- Greene, Joshua M. (2006). Here Comes the Sun: The Spiritual and Musical Journey of George Harrison. Hoboken, NJ: John Wiley & Sons. ISBN 978-0-470-12780-3.
- Harrison, George (2002) [1980]. I, Me, Mine. San Francisco, CA: Chronicle Books. ISBN 978-0-8118-5900-4.
- Harry, Bill (2003). The George Harrison Encyclopedia. London: Virgin Books. ISBN 978-0-7535-0822-0.
- Huntley, Elliot J. (2006). Mystical One: George Harrison – After the Break-up of the Beatles. Toronto, ON: Guernica Editions. ISBN 978-1-55071-197-4.
- Kahn, Ashley (2020). George Harrison on George Harrison: Interviews and Encounters. Chicago, IL: Chicago Review Press. ISBN 978-1-64160-051-4.
- Lavezzoli, Peter (2006). The Dawn of Indian Music in the West. New York, NY: Continuum. ISBN 0-8264-2819-3.
- Leng, Simon (2006). While My Guitar Gently Weeps: The Music of George Harrison. Milwaukee, WI: Hal Leonard. ISBN 978-1-4234-0609-9.
- Lewisohn, Mark (2005) [1988]. The Complete Beatles Recording Sessions: The Official Story of the Abbey Road Years 1962–1970. London: Bounty Books. ISBN 978-0-7537-2545-0.
- MacDonald, Ian (1998). Revolution in the Head: The Beatles' Records and the Sixties. London: Pimlico. ISBN 978-0-7126-6697-8.
- MacFarlane, Thomas (2019). The Music of George Harrison. Abingdon, UK: Routledge. ISBN 978-1-138-59910-9.
- Madinger, Chip; Easter, Mark (2000). Eight Arms to Hold You: The Solo Beatles Compendium. Chesterfield, MO: 44.1 Productions. ISBN 0-615-11724-4.
- Miles, Barry (1998). Paul McCartney: Many Years from Now. New York, NY: Henry Holt and Company. p. 280. ISBN 978-0-8050-5249-7.
- Miles, Barry (2001). The Beatles Diary Volume 1: The Beatles Years. London: Omnibus Press. ISBN 0-7119-8308-9.
- Mojo Special Limited Edition: 1000 Days of Revolution (The Beatles' Final Years – Jan 1, 1968 to Sept 27, 1970). London: Emap. 2003.
- Quantick, David (2002). Revolution: The Making of the Beatles' White Album. Chicago, IL: A Cappella Books. ISBN 1-55652-470-6.
- Rodriguez, Robert (2010). Fab Four FAQ 2.0: The Beatles' Solo Years, 1970–1980. Milwaukee, WI: Backbeat Books. ISBN 978-1-4165-9093-4.
- Ryan, Kevin; Kehew, Brian (2006). Recording the Beatles: The Studio Equipment and Techniques Used to Create Their Classic Albums. Houston, TX: Curvebender Publishing. ISBN 0-9785200-0-9.
- Schaffner, Nicholas (1978). The Beatles Forever. New York, NY: McGraw-Hill. ISBN 0-07-055087-5.
- Tillery, Gary (2011). Working Class Mystic: A Spiritual Biography of George Harrison. Wheaton, IL: Quest Books. ISBN 978-0-8356-0900-5.
- Unterberger, Richie (2006). The Unreleased Beatles: Music & Film. San Francisco, CA: Backbeat Books. ISBN 978-0-8793-0892-6.
- Winn, John C. (2009). That Magic Feeling: The Beatles' Recorded Legacy, Volume Two, 1966–1970. New York, NY: Three Rivers Press. ISBN 978-0-3074-5239-9.
- Woffinden, Bob (1981). The Beatles Apart. London: Proteus. ISBN 0-906071-89-5.
