= Sticks and Stones (Titus Turner song) =

Single by Ray Charles and His Orchestra
- B-side: "Worried Life Blues"
- Released: May 1960
- Genre: R&B
- Length: 2:14
- Label: ABC-Paramount
- Songwriter: Titus Turner
- Producer: Sid Feller

"Sticks and Stones" is an R&B song, written by Titus Turner.

The song is best known in a 1960 version by Ray Charles, who added the Latin drum part. It was his first R&B hit with ABC-Paramount, followed in 1961 with "Hit the Road Jack".

The song was also covered by Jerry Lee Lewis, The Zombies, Golden Earring, Wanda Jackson and The Kingsmen, The Righteous Brothers on Just Once in My Life, as well as Joe Cocker on Mad Dogs & Englishmen, and Elvis Costello in 1994 on the extended play version of Kojak Variety. In 1997, jazz singer Roseanna Vitro included the tune in her tribute to Charles, Catchin’ Some Rays: The Music of Ray Charles. In Australia The Vince Maloney Sect recorded the song in 1966. Vince went to England and joined the Bee Gees.
