= Titus Turner =

American singer

- Born: Titus Lee Turner; May 1, 1933; Atlanta, Georgia, United States
- Died: September 13, 1984 (aged 51) Atlanta, Georgia, United States
- Genres: R&B, East Coast blues, jump blues, soul blues
- Occupations: Singer, songwriter
- Instrument: Vocals
- Years active: 1950–1969
- Labels: Various, including Okeh, Jamie, King

Titus Lee Turner (May 1, 1933 – September 13, 1984) was an American R&B and East Coast blues singer and songwriter. His best-remembered recordings are "We Told You Not to Marry" and "Sound-Off". He also wrote "Leave My Kitten Alone", "Sticks and Stones" and "Tell Me Why".

== Biography ==
Turner was born in Atlanta, Georgia. His debut single, "Where Are You", was released in 1950 by Aladdin Records, credited to Mr. T and his Band. Another single, "Stop Trying to Make a Fool of Me", was released by Regal Records in 1951. A year later he recorded eight tracks for Okeh Records, including "Got So Much Trouble". He then recorded for Wing, an imprint of Mercury Records, but he was not commercially successful until 1955, when Little Willie John recorded Turner's "All Around the World". Another version, retitled "Grits Ain't Groceries", was by Little Milton.

Turner and John then co-wrote "Leave My Kitten Alone", subsequently recorded by Johnny Preston, the Beatles, and Elvis Costello. In 1959, King Records issued Turner's first hit single, "The Return of Stagolee", an answer song to Lloyd Price's "Stagger Lee", followed by "We Told You Not to Marry", an answer to Price's "I'm Gonna Get Married". Ray Charles recorded Turner's song "Sticks and Stones" in 1960 with many cover versions released over the years. By 1961 Turner had his biggest solo success with "Sound-Off", which came from the only album he ever released. The track was described by Joel Whitburn in Top Pop Singles 1955–2002 as a "popular US Army marching drill chant", which had been a number 3 hit for Vaughn Monroe in 1951.

Later singles failed to find a market, and Turner recorded for many labels throughout the 1960s without further tangible success. These included "Eye to Eye" (Okeh, 1966). His final release was a song he wrote, "His Funeral, My Trial", in 1969.

Turner died in Atlanta in 1984.

== Notable songwriting credits ==
- "All Around the World", also known as "Grits Ain't Groceries" (Turner)
- "Big John" (Turner)
- "Get on the Right Track Baby" (Turner)
- "Hey Doll Baby" (Traditional, Turner)
- "Hold Your Loving" (Bernice Snelson, Turner)
- "If It's Good" (Julia Lee, Turner) - Julia Lee and her Boyfriends
- "Leave My Kitten Alone" (Little Willie John, James McDougal, Turner)
- "Little Girl Lost" (Luther Dixon, Lou Harrison, Turner)
- "Living in Misery" (Turner)
- "Lotus Blossom" (Julia Lee, Turner) - Julia Lee and her Boyfriends
- "People Sure Act Funny" (Bobby Robinson, Turner)
- "Soulville" (Henry Glover, Morris Levy, Dinah Washington, Turner)
- "Sticks and Stones" (Turner)
- "Stop the Pain" (Turner)
- "Tell It Like It Is" (Turner) - Little Willie John
- "Tell Me Why" (Turner) - Marie Knight (1956), Gale Storm (1956), The Crew-Cuts (1956), Elvis Presley (1966)

== Discography ==
=== Albums ===
- Sound Off (1961), Jamie

=== Compilation albums ===
- Soulville: Golden Classics (1990), Collectables Records
- Sound Off: The Jamie Masters (1994), Bear Family
- Titans of R&B (1998), Red Lightnin' (UK)
- 1949–1954 (2005), Classics R&B

=== Chart singles ===
- "Return of Stagolee" (King 5186) (April 1959), US R&B number 29
- "We Told You Not to Marry" (Glover 201) (December 1959), US Pop number 83; Canada number 36
- "Sound-Off" (Jamie 1174) (March 1961), US Pop number 77

== See also ==
- List of East Coast blues musicians
- List of jump blues musicians
