= Ob-La-Di, Ob-La-Da =

1968 song by the Beatles

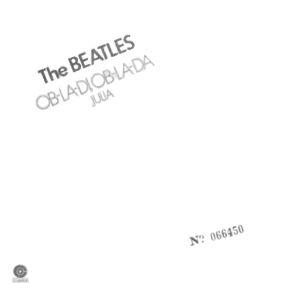
- Picture sleeve for the song's 1976 US single release

Single by the Beatles

from the album The Beatles
- B-side: "While My Guitar Gently Weeps"; "Julia" (US)
- Released: 22 November 1968
- Recorded: 8, 9, 11 and 15 July 1968
- Studio: EMI, London
- Genre: Pop; ska
- Length: 3:07
- Label: Apple
- Songwriter: Lennon–McCartney
- Producer: George Martin

Audio sample
- "Ob-La-Di, Ob-La-Da": file; help

Audio
- "Ob-La-Di, Ob-La-Da" on YouTube

"Ob-La-Di, Ob-La-Da" is a song by the English rock band the Beatles from their 1968 double album The Beatles (also known as "the White Album"). It was written by Paul McCartney and credited to the Lennon–McCartney partnership. Following the album's release, the song was issued as a single in many countries, although not in the United Kingdom or the United States, and topped singles charts in Australia, Japan, New Zealand, Switzerland and West Germany. When belatedly issued as a single in the United States in 1976, it peaked at number 49 on the Billboard Hot 100.

McCartney wrote "Ob-La-Di, Ob-La-Da" in a cod Jamaican ska style and appropriated a phrase popularised by Jimmy Scott, a London-based Nigerian musician, for the song's title and chorus. Following its release, Scott attempted, unsuccessfully, to receive a composing credit. The recording sessions for the track were marked by disharmony as McCartney's perfectionism tested his bandmates and their recording staff. A heated argument during one of the sessions led to Geoff Emerick quitting his job as the Beatles' recording engineer. A discarded early version of the track, featuring Scott on congas, was going to be released as a single in the mid-1980s, but was eventually included on the band's 1996 compilation Anthology 3.

The Beatles' decision not to release the single in the UK or the US led to several cover recordings by other artists, who sought to achieve a chart hit with the song.

== Background and inspiration ==
Paul McCartney began writing "Ob-La-Di, Ob-La-Da" during the Beatles' stay in Rishikesh, India, in early 1968. Prudence Farrow, one of their fellow Transcendental Meditation students there, recalled McCartney, John Lennon and George Harrison playing it to her in an attempt to lure her out of her room, where she had become immersed in intense meditation. McCartney wrote the song when reggae was becoming popular in Britain; author Ian MacDonald describes it as "McCartney's rather approximate tribute to the Jamaican ska idiom". The character of Desmond in the lyrics, from the opening line "Desmond has a barrow in the market-place", was a reference to reggae singer Desmond Dekker, who had recently toured the UK. The tag line "Ob-la-di, ob-la-da, life goes on, brah" was an expression used by Nigerian conga player Jimmy Scott-Emuakpor, an acquaintance of McCartney. According to Scott's widow, as part of his stage act with his band Ob-La-Di Ob-La-Da, Scott would call out "Ob la di", to which the audience would respond "Ob la da", and he would then conclude: "Life goes on".

After the release of "Ob-La-Di, Ob-La-Da" in November 1968, Scott tried to claim a writer's credit for the use of his catchphrase. McCartney said that the phrase was "just an expression", whereas Scott argued that it was not a common expression and was used exclusively by the Scott-Emuakpor family. McCartney was angry that the British press sided with Scott over the issue. According to researchers Doug Sulpy and Ray Schweighardt, in their study of the tapes from the Beatles' filmed rehearsals at Twickenham Film Studios in January 1969, McCartney complained bitterly to his bandmates about Scott's claim that he "stole" the phrase. Later in 1969, while in Brixton Prison awaiting trial for failing to pay maintenance to his ex-wife, Scott sent a request to the Beatles asking them to pay his legal bills. McCartney agreed to pay the amount on the condition that Scott abandon his attempt to receive a co-writer's credit.

== Recording ==
The Beatles gathered at Harrison's Esher home in Surrey in May 1968, after their return from Rishikesh, to record demos for their upcoming project. "Ob-La-Di, Ob-La-Da" was one of the 27 demos recorded there. McCartney performed this demo solo, with only an acoustic guitar. He also double-tracked his vocal, which was not perfectly synchronised, creating an echoing effect.

The formal recording of "Ob-La-Di, Ob-La-Da" took place in July and involved several days of work. The first completed version of the track, recorded between 3 and 5 July, featured Scott playing congas and a trio of saxophonists. At McCartney's insistence, the band remade the song in an effort to capture the performance for which he was aiming. In doing so, according to Beatles historian Mark Lewisohn, "the Beatles were creating another first: the first time they had especially recruited session musicians and then rejected the recording." (Note: According to author Peter Ames Carlin, McCartney's "fussiness" over the track was him exacting "revenge" for Lennon's self-indulgence on "Revolution 9". Lennon had created this eight-minute experimental piece, with Harrison and Yoko Ono, while McCartney was in Los Angeles on business relating to Apple Records.)

Work began on the new version on 8 July. In the recollection of Geoff Emerick, the band's recording engineer, Lennon "openly and vocally detested" the song, calling it "more of Paul's 'granny music shit'", although at times he appeared enthusiastic, "acting the fool and doing his fake Jamaican patois". Having left the studio at one point, Lennon then returned under the influence of marijuana. Out of frustration at being made to continually work on the song, he went straight to the piano and played the opening chords louder and faster than before, in what MacDonald describes as a "mock music-hall" style. Lennon claimed that this was how the song should be played, and it was this the version that the Beatles ultimately used. McCartney nevertheless decided to remake the track once more. During the afternoon session on 9 July, the Beatles recorded a new basic track, which Lewisohn says possibly featured McCartney playing the drums instead of Ringo Starr. Despite this further work, McCartney conceded that the basic track from the previous day was adequate, and the band returned to the 8 July recording for overdubs during the evening session.

McCartney's perfectionism annoyed his bandmates, and when their producer, George Martin, offered him suggestions for his vocal part, McCartney rebuked him, saying, "Well you come down and sing it." According to Emerick, the usually placid Martin shouted in reply: "Then bloody sing it again! I give up. I just don't know any better how to help you." The following day, Emerick quit working for the group; he later cited this exchange between McCartney and Martin as one of the reasons, as well as the unpleasant atmosphere that had typified the White Album sessions up to that point.

In the final verse, McCartney made an error by singing, "Desmond stays at home and does his pretty face" (rather than Molly), and likewise had Molly "let[ting] the children lend a hand". This mistake was retained because the other Beatles liked it. Harrison and Lennon yell "arm" and "leg" between the lines "Desmond lets the children lend a hand" and "Molly stays at home".

The lyrics of Harrison's White Album track "Savoy Truffle" include the lines "We all know Ob-la-di-bla-da / But can you show me where you are?" Like Lennon, Harrison had been vocal in his dislike of "Ob-La-Di, Ob-La-Da". According to music journalist Robert Fontenot, the reference in "Savoy Truffle" was Harrison's way of conveying his opinion of McCartney's song.

== Releases and live performances ==
"Ob-La-Di, Ob-La-Da" was released on The Beatles on 22 November 1968. As one of the most popular tracks on the album, it was also issued as a single, backed by "While My Guitar Gently Weeps", in many countries, although not in the main commercial markets of the UK and the United States. McCartney had wanted the single released in these two countries also, but his bandmates vetoed the idea. In November 1976, Capitol Records issued the song as a single in the US, with "Julia" as the B-side. The sleeves were white and individually numbered, as copies of the White Album had been. The discarded version of the song, known as "Take 5" and featuring Scott on congas, was scheduled for release as the B-side to the "Leave My Kitten Alone" single in January 1985, but was withdrawn when the Sessions album project was canceled. It was released 11 years later on the Anthology 3 compilation in 1996.

The first time the song was performed live by any of the Beatles was on 2 December 2009, when McCartney played it in Hamburg, Germany, on the first night of a European tour. Author Howard Sounes comments that, despite Lennon's derision of the song, it "went down a storm" in Hamburg – the city where the Beatles had honed their act in the early 1960s. McCartney included "Ob-La-Di, Ob-La-Da" in his set list for the 2009 tour and in the set list for tours he made through to 2012. He also performed it in front of Buckingham Palace for the Queen's Diamond Jubilee celebrations, then at San Francisco's Outside Lands concert on 9 August 2013. McCartney again featured the song in his set list for his 2013–15 Out There! tour and his 2016–17 One on One tour, as well as his 7 September 2018 Grand Central Terminal concert and his head-line appearance at the Glastonbury Festival in 2022.

== Reception ==
"Ob-La-Di, Ob-La-Da" topped singles charts in West Germany, Austria, Switzerland, Australia, New Zealand and Japan over 1968–69. In 1969, Lennon and McCartney received an Ivor Novello Award for the song. When belatedly issued as a single in the US, in 1976, "Ob-La-Di, Ob-La-Da" peaked at number 49 on the Billboard Hot 100. According to author Steve Turner, it has been described as the first song in the "white ska" style. In Australia, where the song was part of a double A-side single (backed with the Harrison composition "While My Guitar Gently Weeps"), the record achieved sales of over 50,000 copies, being eligible for the award of a Gold Disc.

In his contemporary review of the White Album, for Rolling Stone, Jann Wenner called "Ob-La-Di, Ob-La-Da" "fun music for a fun song about fun", adding, "Who needs answers?" Record Mirror's reviewer said it was the album's "most pleasant and best recorded track" and praised the "chuck-chuck piano and drum sound". Nik Cohn, writing in The New York Times, gave the double LP an unfavourable review in which he criticised the Beatles for resorting to musical pastiche. He said that "Ob-La-Di, Ob-La-Da" was "mock-West Indies" and that like the album's other examples of "mock-[music]", "none of it works, it all loses out to the originals, it all sounds stale." The NME's Alan Smith admired the "good-to-be-alive groove" and said the song was "a great personal favourite". He added: "Heard it once, can't stop. Handclapping fun à la West Indies, sung with warmth by Paul ... This is going to be a smash [hit] for somebody ..."

Ian MacDonald described "Ob-La-Di, Ob-La-Da" as "one of the most spontaneous-sounding tracks on The Beatles" as well as the most commercial, but also a song filled with "desperate levity" and "trite by McCartney's standards". Conversely, Stephen Thomas Erlewine of AllMusic includes it among McCartney's "stunning" compositions on the album. Ian Fortnam of Classic Rock magazine groups it with "Martha My Dear", "Rocky Raccoon" and "Honey Pie" as examples of the "awful lot of sugar" McCartney contributed to the White Album, in an attempt to make it more "palatable" in response to Lennon's determination to include his eight-minute avant-garde piece "Revolution 9".

"Ob-La-Di, Ob-La-Da" is often the subject of ridicule. In 2004, it was included in Blender magazine's list titled "50 Worst Songs Ever!" and was voted the worst song of all time in an online poll organised by Mars. In 2012, the NME's website editor, Luke Lewis, argued that the Beatles had recorded "a surprising amount of ropy old toss", and singled out "Ob-La-Di, Ob-La-Da" as "the least convincing cod-reggae skanking this side of the QI theme tune". That same year, Tom Rowley of The Daily Telegraph said the track was a "reasonable choice" for derision, following the result of the Mars poll, and it subsequently came second (behind "Revolution 9") in the Telegraph's poll to determine the worst Beatles song.

Nevertheless, a 2019 study published by researchers at the Max Planck Institute for Human Cognitive and Brain Sciences identified "Ob-La-Di, Ob-La-Da" as the "perfect" pop song based on the way its chord progression balances predictability and surprise. The researchers analyzed approximately 80,000 chord transitions from 745 Billboard Hot 100 songs and tested listeners' responses to selected chord sequences; for the listening experiment, the original songs were stripped of their melodies and lyrics, making them largely unrecognizable to participants so as to focus attention on the harmonic progressions of the songs. The study found that listeners tended to experience greater pleasure when chords were surprising after a sequence had created a strong expectation of what would follow. Among the songs tested with the listeners, the Beatles' "Ob-La-Di, Ob-La-Da" was identified as particularly effective at combining predictability and surprise in its chord progression and most closely matched the pattern associated with pleasurable chord transitions, followed by Genesis' "Invisible Touch" and B.J. Thomas' "Hooked on a Feeling (song)". The researchers did not want to establish an objective, universal definition of the "perfect pop song", but instead identified harmonic patterns associated with increased listener pleasure; their findings suggest that musical enjoyment may arise partly from a balance between familiarity and unexpected harmonic changes, rather than from predictability alone.

== Personnel ==
According to Ian MacDonald and Mark Lewisohn:

The Beatles

- Paul McCartney – vocal, electric bass, acoustic bass, handclaps, vocal percussion
- John Lennon – piano, backing vocal, handclaps, vocal percussion
- George Harrison – acoustic guitar, backing vocal, handclaps, vocal percussion
- Ringo Starr – drums, bongos, maracas, other percussion, handclaps, vocal percussion

Additional musicians

- James Gray, Rex Morris, Cyril Reuben – saxophones
- George Martin – woodwind arrangement

== Cover versions ==
=== The Marmalade ===
"Ob-La-Di, Ob-La-Da"
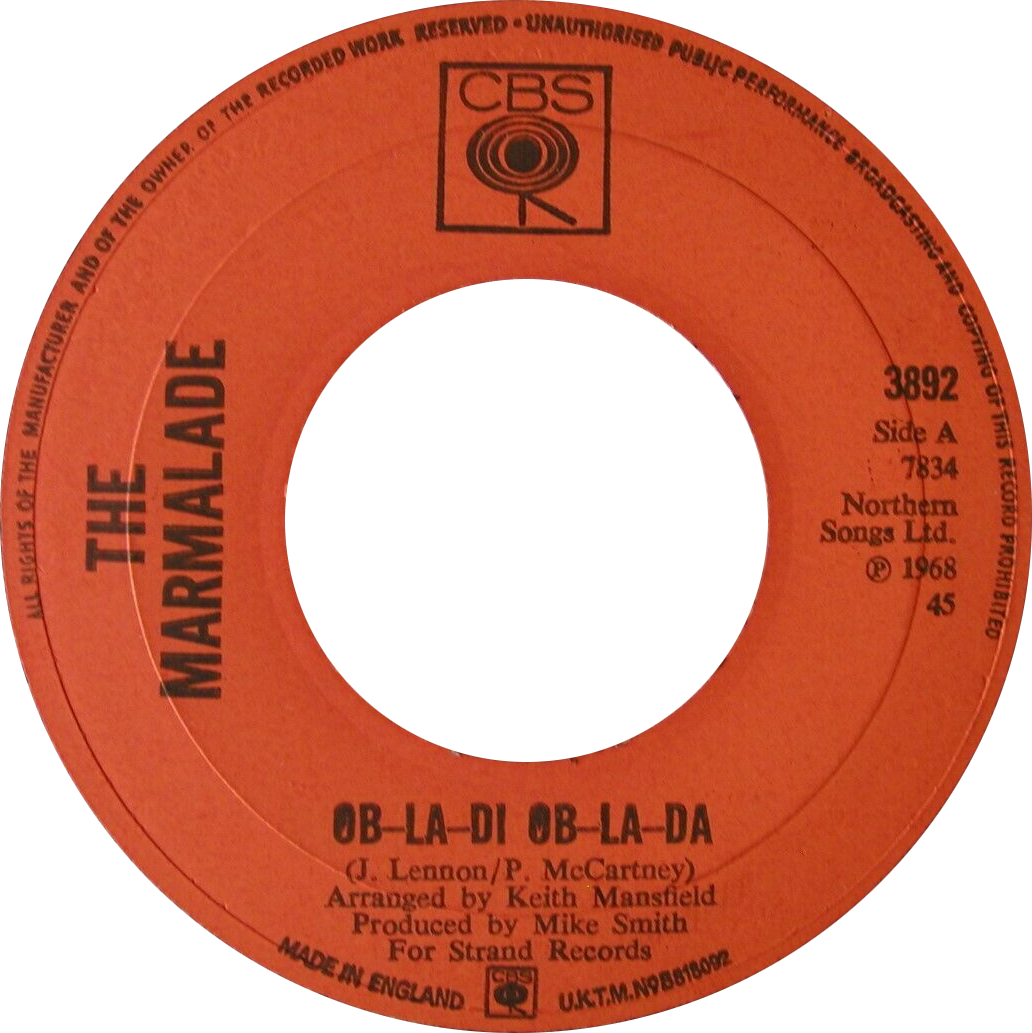
- UK A-side face label

Single by The Marmalade
- B-side: "Chains"
- Released: 29 November 1968
- Genre: Pop
- Label: CBS
- Songwriter: Lennon–McCartney
- Producer: Mike Smith

The Marmalade singles chronology
"Wait for Me Mary-Anne" (1968)	"Ob-La-Di, Ob-La-Da" (1968)	"Baby Make It Soon" (1969)

Music video
- "Ob-La-Di, Ob-La-Da" by Marmalade (1968, from Beat-Club series) on YouTube

The Beatles' decision not to issue "Ob-La-Di, Ob-La-Da" as a single in the UK or the US led to many acts rushing to record the song, in the hope of achieving a hit in those countries. A recording by the Scottish pop band The Marmalade, released in November 1968, became the most commercially successful of all the cover versions of songs from The Beatles. It reached number one in the UK Singles Chart in January 1969, making The Marmalade the first Scottish artist to top that chart.

The Marmalade's recording sold around half a million in the UK, and a million copies globally by April 1969. During the group's TV appearance on BBC One's Top of the Pops to promote the track, four of the five band members wore kilts; their English-born drummer instead dressed as a redcoat. Reflecting the song's popularity in the UK, according to author Alan Clayson, comedian Benny Hill included the band's name with Cream and Grapefruit in a sketch where a hungover radio disc jockey is continually confronted by phone-in requests that exacerbate his nausea.

=== Other artists ===
Aside from Marmalade, two other acts achieved hits in Europe with "Ob-La-Di, Ob-La-Da". In 1968, a recording by the Bedrocks, a West Indian band from Leeds, peaked at number 20 on the Record Retailer chart. In a discussion at Twickenham Studios in January 1969, McCartney and his girlfriend, Linda Eastman, said they both liked the Bedrocks' version best out of all the cover versions up to that point, including a recent single by Arthur Conley. Also in 1968, the Spectrum reached number 19 on the German singles chart with their cover. Emil Dimitrov released an EP of which the first track is a cover of the song in the same year. In 1969, Herb Alpert & The Tijuana Brass covered it for their album Warm.

Happy Mondays included "Desmond", which used part of the melody from "Ob-La-Di, Ob-La-Da", on their debut album Squirrel and G-Man Twenty Four Hour Party People Plastic Face Carnt Smile (White Out), released in 1987. Partly through the involvement of Michael Jackson, who owned the Beatles' Northern Songs catalogue, the track was removed from later pressings of the album because of the strong similarity. Later, music fans and several critics and DJs noticed similarities between "Ob-La-Di, Ob-La-Da" and The Offspring's 1999 single "Why Don't You Get a Job?"

The song opens Herbie Mann's 1974 album Reggae.

== Chart history ==
=== The Beatles version ===
Chart (1969)	Peak position
Australian Go-Set National Top 40	1
Australian Kent Music Report	1
Austria (Ö3 Austria Top 40)	1
Belgium (Ultratop 50 Flanders)	5
Belgian Ultratop (Wallonia)	2
French Singles Chart	3
Finland (Suomen virallinen lista)	15
Italian Musica e Dischi Chart	4
Japanese Oricon Singles Chart	7
Japanese Oricon International Chart	1
Netherlands (Single Top 100)	3
New Zealand Listener Chart	1
Switzerland (Schweizer Hitparade)	1
West German Musikmarkt Hit-Parade	1

Chart (1976–77)	Peak position
Canada RPM Top Singles	27
Canada RPM Adult Contemporary	29
US Billboard Hot 100	49
US Billboard Adult Contemporary	39
US Cash Box Top 100	47

=== Marmalade version ===
Chart (1968–69)	Peak position
Austria (Ö3 Austria Top 40)	1
Ireland (IRMA)	1
New Zealand (Listener)	1
Norway (VG-lista)	1
Switzerland (Schweizer Hitparade)	2
UK Record Retailer Chart	1

=== Certifications ===
Region	Certification	Certified units/sales
New Zealand (RMNZ) The Beatles version	Platinum	30,000^{‡}
United Kingdom (BPI) The Beatles version	Silver	200,000^{‡}
^{‡} Sales+streaming figures based on certification alone.

== See also ==
- Nonsense song

== Sources ==
- Carlin, Peter Ames (2009). Paul McCartney: A Life. New York, NY: Touchstone/Simon & Schuster. ISBN 978-1-4165-6223-8.
- Clayson, Alan (2003). Paul McCartney. London: Sanctuary. ISBN 1-86074-486-9.
- Emerick, Geoff; Massey, Howard (2006). Here, There and Everywhere: My Life Recording the Music of The Beatles. New York: Penguin Books. ISBN 1-59240-179-1.
- Giuliano, Geoffrey; Giuliano, Avalon (2005). Revolver: The Secret History of the Beatles. London: John Blake. ISBN 978-1-84454-160-7.
- Lewisohn, Mark (2005) [1988]. The Complete Beatles Recording Sessions: The Official Story of the Abbey Road Years 1962–1970. London: Bounty Books. ISBN 978-0-7537-2545-0.
- MacDonald, Ian (1998). Revolution in the Head: The Beatles' Records and the Sixties. London: Pimlico. ISBN 978-0-7126-6697-8.
- Miles, Barry (1997). Paul McCartney: Many Years from Now. New York, NY: Henry Holt. ISBN 0-8050-5249-6.
- Miles, Barry (2001). The Beatles Diary Volume 1: The Beatles Years. London: Omnibus Press. ISBN 0-7119-8308-9.
- Murrells, Joseph (1978). The Book of Golden Discs (2nd ed.). London: Barrie and Jenkins. ISBN 0-214-20512-6.
- Quantick, David (2002). Revolution: The Making of the Beatles' White Album. Chicago, IL: A Cappella Books. ISBN 1-55652-470-6.
- Roberts, David (2006). British Hit Singles & Albums (19th ed.). London: Guinness World Records Limited. ISBN 1-904994-10-5.
- Roessner, Jeffrey (2006). "We All Want to Change the World: Postmodern Politics and the Beatles' White Album". In Womack, Ken; Davis, Todd (eds.). Reading the Beatles: Cultural Studies, Literary Criticism, and the Fab Four. Albany, NY: SUNY Press. ISBN 0-7914-8196-4.
- Schaffner, Nicholas (1978). The Beatles Forever. New York, NY: McGraw-Hill. ISBN 0-07-055087-5.
- Sounes, Howard (2010). Fab: An Intimate Life of Paul McCartney. London: HarperCollins. ISBN 978-0-00-723705-0.
- Spitz, Bob (2005). The Beatles: The Biography. Boston, MA: Little, Brown. ISBN 0-316-80352-9.
- Spizer, Bruce (2003). The Beatles on Apple Records. New Orleans, LA: 498 Productions. ISBN 0-9662649-4-0.
- Sulpy, Doug; Schweighardt, Ray (1997). Get Back: The Unauthorized Chronicle of The Beatles' Let It Be Disaster. New York, NY: St. Martin's Griffin. ISBN 0-312-19981-3.
- Turner, Steve (2012) [1994]. A Hard Day's Write: The Stories Behind Every Beatles Song. London: Carlton Books. ISBN 978-1-78097-096-7.
- Unterberger, Richie (2006). The Unreleased Beatles: Music & Film. San Francisco, CA: Backbeat Books. ISBN 978-0-87930-892-6.
- Winn, John C. (2009). That Magic Feeling: The Beatles' Recorded Legacy, Volume Two, 1966–1970. New York, NY: Three Rivers Press. ISBN 978-0-307-45239-9.
- Womack, Kenneth (2014). The Beatles Encyclopedia: Everything Fab Four. Santa Barbara, CA: ABC-CLIO. ISBN 978-0-313-39171-2.
