= Vinyl rip =

Recording transferred from vinyl to digital audio

A vinyl rip is a version of a recording that has been transferred from a vinyl record to digital audio or other formats. They are sometimes traded among music collectors, especially when the original vinyl recording has not been released officially on a subsequent consumer format. It is also referred to as a "needle drop" or "record rip".

Other reasons for trading vinyl rips include the lack of availability of certain recordings on digital media, the non-availability of less compressed versions in digital form, or the lack of availability of certain versions or mixes of that recording, e.g. mono or stereo versions, or the loss of the master tape. In 2025, the company Revibed was criticized for selling vinyl rips of material that has not been officially released.

== See also ==
- Loudness war
