= While My Guitar Gently Weeps =

1968 song by the Beatles

- Cover of the Apple Publishing sheet music

Song by the Beatles

from the album The Beatles
- Released: 22 November 1968
- Recorded: 5–6 September 1968
- Studio: EMI, London
- Genre: Hard rock; blues; rock
- Length: 4:46
- Label: Apple
- Songwriter: George Harrison
- Producer: George Martin

Music video
- "While My Guitar Gently Weeps" on YouTube

"While My Guitar Gently Weeps" is a song by the English rock band the Beatles from their 1968 double album The Beatles (also known as the "White Album"). It was written by George Harrison, the band's lead guitarist, as an exercise in randomness inspired by the Chinese I Ching. The song conveys his dismay at the world's unrealised potential for universal love, which he refers to as "the love there that's sleeping".

The song also serves as a comment on the disharmony within the Beatles after their return from studying Transcendental Meditation in India in early 1968. This lack of camaraderie was reflected in the band's initial apathy towards the composition, which Harrison countered by inviting his friend and occasional collaborator, Eric Clapton, to contribute to the recording. Clapton overdubbed a lead guitar part, although he was not formally credited for his contribution. Harrison first recorded it with a sparse backing of acoustic guitar and harmonium – a version that appeared on the 1996 Anthology 3 outtakes compilation and, with the addition of a string arrangement by George Martin, on the Love soundtrack album in 2006. The full group recording was made in September 1968, at which point the song's folk-based musical arrangement was replaced by a production in the heavy rock style. The recording was one of several collaborations between Harrison and Clapton during the late 1960s and was followed by the pair co-writing the song "Badge" for Clapton's group Cream.

On release, the song received praise from several music critics, and it has since been recognised as an example of Harrison's maturing as a songwriter beside his Beatles bandmates John Lennon and Paul McCartney. Rolling Stone ranked "While My Guitar Gently Weeps" 135th on its list of "The 500 Greatest Songs of All Time", seventh on the "100 Greatest Guitar Songs of All Time", and at number 10 on its list of "The Beatles 100 Greatest Songs". Clapton's performance was ranked 42nd in Guitar World's 2008 list of the "100 Greatest Guitar Solos". Harrison and Clapton often performed the song together live, during which they shared the lead guitar role over the closing section. Live versions featuring the pair were included on the Concert for Bangladesh album in 1971 and Live in Japan in 1992. Backed by a band that included McCartney and Ringo Starr, Clapton performed the song at the Concert for George in November 2002, a year after Harrison's death.

== Background and inspiration ==
The Eastern concept is that whatever happens is all meant to be ... every little item that's going down has a purpose. "While My Guitar Gently Weeps" was a simple study based on that theory ... I picked up a book at random, opened it, saw "gently weeps", then laid the book down again and started the song.

— George Harrison

George Harrison wrote "While My Guitar Gently Weeps" after his return from India, where the Beatles had been studying Transcendental Meditation under Maharishi Mahesh Yogi during the spring of 1968. The visit had allowed Harrison to re-engage with the guitar as his primary instrument, after focusing on the Indian sitar for the previous two years, and also marked the start of a prolific period for him as a songwriter. Inspiration for the song came to him when he was visiting his parents in Warrington, Cheshire, and he began reading the I Ching, or "The Book of Changes". As Harrison put it, "[the book] seemed to me to be based on the Eastern concept that everything is relative to everything else, as opposed to the Western view that things are merely coincidental." Embracing this idea of relativism, he committed to writing a song based on the first words he saw upon opening a book, which were "gently weeps". Harrison continued to work on the lyrics after this initial writing session.

The song reflects the disharmonious atmosphere within the Beatles following their return from India. Harrison had led the band in their highly publicised endorsement of Transcendental Meditation and viewed this spiritual pursuit as superior in importance to their career momentum. When discussing another song he wrote at this time, "Not Guilty", Harrison said it referred to "the grief I was catching" from John Lennon and Paul McCartney for leading them to Rishikesh and supposedly hindering the group's career and the launch of their Apple record label. Eric Clapton, with whom Harrison collaborated on several recordings throughout 1968 as a distraction from the Beatles, said that "While My Guitar Gently Weeps" conveyed Harrison's spiritual isolation within the group. (Note: Having contributed to "Ski-ing" on Harrison's debut solo album, Wonderwall Music, in January 1968, Clapton played on "Sour Milk Sea", a song that Harrison wrote and produced for his Apple Records signing Jackie Lomax. Another Harrison composition from 1968, "Savoy Truffle", was inspired by Clapton's love of chocolate.) Author Jonathan Gould writes that, although in the past each of the Beatles had become temporarily subsumed in fads and personal interests, the level of Harrison's commitment to Indian spirituality as an alternative to the band was unprecedented.

A demo that Harrison recorded at his home in Esher includes an unused verse: "I look at the trouble and hate that is raging / While my guitar gently weeps / As I'm sitting here, doing nothing but ageing …" This version also includes the line "The problems you sow are the troubles you're reaping", which he similarly discarded. An early acoustic guitar and harmonium performance of the song features a slightly different third verse: "I look from the wings at the play you are staging / While my guitar gently weeps / As I'm sitting here, doing nothing but ageing …" This version was released on the 1996 compilation Anthology 3 and was used as the basis of the 2006 Love remix, with a string arrangement by George Martin.

== Composition ==
=== Music ===
"While My Guitar Gently Weeps"
A 22-second sample of "While My Guitar Gently Weeps".

"While My Guitar Gently Weeps" was one of the few Beatles compositions from early 1968 that changed markedly from demo form to the official recording. Harrison's demos suggest the influence of folk music, yet the Beatles' version is in the heavy rock style typical of much of the band's late 1960s work. While noting the importance of Harrison's return to the guitar during this period, Gould describes the song as "virtually a declaration of his recommitment to rock".

The song as originally issued by the Beatles is in the key of A minor, changing to A major over the bridges. Aside from the intro, the composition is structured into two rounds of verse and bridge, with an instrumental passage extending the second of these verse sections, followed by a final verse and a long instrumental passage that fades out on the released recording. All the sections consist of an even sixteen bars or measures, which are divided into four phrases.

The chord progression over the verses includes a descending bass of A–G–F♯–F (I–♭VII–VI–♭VI) over an A-minor chord, leading to F-major on the F bass note. According to musicologist Dominic Pedler, the I–♭VII–VI–♭VI progression represents a hybrid of the Aeolian and Dorian modes. The change to the parallel major key is heralded by a C chord as the verse's penultimate chord (replacing the D used in the second phrase of each verse) before the E that leads into the bridge. Musicologist Alan Pollack views this combination of C and E as representing a sense of "arrival", after which the bridge contains "upward [harmonic] gestures" that contrast with the bass descents that dominate the verse. Such contrasts are limited by the inclusion of minor triads (ii, iii, and vi) played over the E chord that ends the bridge's second and fourth phrases.

=== Lyrics ===
In his lyrics to "While My Guitar Gently Weeps", Harrison revisits the theme of universal love and the philosophical concerns that were evident in his overtly Indian-influenced compositions, particularly "Within You Without You". The song is a lament for how a universal love for humankind is latent in all individuals yet remains unrealised. In the description of theologian Dale Allison, the song "conveys spiritual angst and an urgent religious point of view without being explicitly theological". Harrison sings of surveying "you all" and seeing "the love there that's sleeping". Musicologist Walter Everett comments that the change from the minor-mode verse to the parallel major might express hope that "unrealized potential" described in the lyrics is to be "fulfilled", but the continued minor triads "seem to express a strong dismay that love is not to be unfolded". During the bridges, Harrison adopts a repetitive rhyming scheme in the style of Bob Dylan to convey how humankind has become distracted from its ability to manifest this love. He sings of people that have been "inverted" and "perverted" from their natural perspective.

"While My Guitar Gently Weeps" follows in a lyrical tradition established by Woody Guthrie, Pete Seeger and Bo Diddley, whereby emotions and actions are attributed to a musical instrument. According to an NME reviewer, writing in 1998, the song conveys "serious concern" for the Beatles' "dwindling esprit de corps". Harrison biographer Joshua Greene says that its message reflects the pessimism encouraged by world events throughout 1968, such as the assassinations of Martin Luther King and Robert Kennedy in the United States, and the Warsaw Pact invasion of Czechoslovakia. (Note: Greene comments that "Wilting Flowers" was the title of Time magazine's article summarising the year. By contrast, at the start of 1968, Life had declared it "the Year of the Guru", partly as a result of the Beatles' championing of Eastern religion, and had featured the Maharishi on the cover of the magazine.) Allison writes that the lyrics represent the "antithesis of spiritual triumphalism", in which Harrison "mourns because love has not conquered all".

== Recording ==
=== Early attempts and basic track ===
The Beatles recorded "While My Guitar Gently Weeps" several times during the sessions for their self-titled double album, also known as "the White Album". The recording sessions, which began in late May 1968, were characterised by a lack of co-operation among the four band members, and by what Lennon's bandmates regarded as the overly intrusive presence of his new romantic partner, Yoko Ono. In this atmosphere, Harrison had initially been reluctant to present his new compositions to the group. Take 1 on 25 July – the version later issued on Anthology 3 – was a solo performance by Harrison, playing his Gibson J-200 acoustic guitar, with an overdubbed harmonium part. (Note: This version remained in EMI's archives through the 1980s. It was first presented for public hearing when Abbey Road Studios (formerly EMI Studios) hosted The Beatles at Abbey Road in 1983, at which point EMI reported that Harrison was keen that the song be released "as soon as possible". When remixing the recording for inclusion on the planned Sessions compilation album in 1984, however (and as later heard on Anthology 3), Geoff Emerick chose to loop and repeat Harrison's concluding guitar phrase into a fadeout, and increased the volume of the harmonium.)

Sessions on 16 August and 5 September produced full band recordings of the song. In the case of the 16 August version, an overdubbing session on 3 September marked the first time that the Beatles had used eight-track recording at EMI Studios. According to Ken Scott, the band's recording engineer, Harrison saw the eight-track recorder in a corridor and, defying EMI regulations that new equipment should be thoroughly tested, insisted that they use it immediately. At the same session, Harrison overdubbed a backwards (or "backmasked") guitar solo, as he had done two years before on "I'm Only Sleeping", on the Revolver album, but he was not satisfied with the results. The Beatles then remade the basic track on 5 September – a session that marked Ringo Starr's return to the group after he had walked out on 22 August, upset at the unpleasant atmosphere. While Harrison led the band in welcoming back their drummer, by installing a large flower display all over Starr's drum kit, he continued to think that his bandmates were not giving their best to the song. (Note: In the Beatles Anthology book, Harrison recalls of this 5 September session: "Paul and John were so used to just cranking out their own tunes that it was very difficult at times to get serious and record one of mine. It wasn't happening ... so I went home that night thinking 'Well, that's a shame', because I knew the song was pretty good.")

=== Overdubs ===
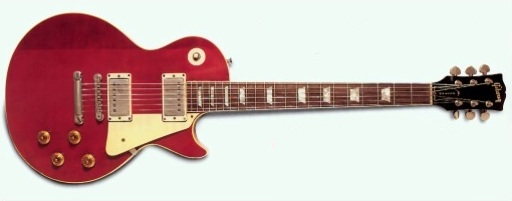
Clapton had given Harrison his red Gibson Les Paul shortly before the session and subsequently used it on the song.

On 6 September, during a ride from Surrey into London, Harrison asked Clapton to play guitar on the track. Clapton, who recognised Harrison's talent as a songwriter, and considered that his abilities had long been held back by Lennon and McCartney, was nevertheless reluctant to participate; he later recalled that his initial response was: "I can't do that. Nobody ever plays on Beatles records." Harrison convinced him, and Clapton's lead guitar part, played on Harrison's Gibson Les Paul electric guitar "Lucy" (a recent gift from Clapton), was overdubbed that evening. Recalling the session in his 2007 autobiography, Clapton says that, while Lennon and McCartney were "fairly non-committal", he thought the track "sounded fantastic", adding: "I knew George was happy, because he listened to it over and over in the control room".

Harrison recalled that Clapton's presence also ensured that his bandmates "tr[ied] a bit harder" and "were all on their best behaviour". The Beatles carried out the remaining overdubs, which included an ascending piano motif, played by McCartney, over the introduction, Hammond organ by Harrison, and further percussion by Starr. McCartney also added a second bass part, played on his Fender Jazz Bass rather than on either of his usual Höfner or Rickenbacker models.

=== Mixing ===
Still wary that his contribution might present too much of a departure from the band's sound, Clapton requested that Harrison give the lead guitar track a more "Beatley" sound when mixing the song. During final mixing for the White Album, on 14 October, the guitar part was run through an ADT circuit with "varispeed", with engineer Chris Thomas manipulating the oscillator to achieve the desired "wobbly" effect. (Note: In Scott's recollection, the need to manually work the ADT oscillation was a result of the Beatles' impatience to use EMI's new eight-track recording equipment. The company's technical engineers had yet to carry out the conversion necessary to allow the effect to be applied automatically.) According to Everett, Lennon's tremolo-rich guitar part, recorded on 5 September, was retained only in the song's coda.

Everett credits Clapton's guitar contribution with making the Beatles recording a "monumental" track. As particularly notable features, he highlights the increasing lengths of thrice-heard first scale degrees (0:17–0:19), the restraint shown by rests in many bars then unexpected appearances (as at 0:28–0:29), commanding turnaround phrases (0:31–0:33), expressive string bends marking modal changes from C to C♯ (0:47–0:53), power retransition (1:21–1:24), emotive vibrato (2:01–2:07), and a solo (1:55–2:31) with a "measured rise in intensity, rhythmic activity, tonal drive and registral climb". In October 1968, Harrison reciprocated by co-writing "Badge" with Clapton and playing on Cream's recording of the track. (Note: Released on Cream's final album, Goodbye, "Badge" reflected Harrison's pop sensibilities and helped Clapton transition from the heavy blues style and its reliance on extended soloing, and onto the more song-based approach that he and Harrison admired in the Band's 1968 album Music from Big Pink.)

== Release and reception ==
Apple Records released The Beatles on 22 November 1968. One of four Harrison compositions on the double album, "While My Guitar Gently Weeps" was sequenced as the penultimate track on side one in the LP format, between Lennon's "The Continuing Story of Bungalow Bill" and "Happiness Is a Warm Gun". The song was issued as the B-side of "Ob-La-Di, Ob-La-Da", a McCartney-written song that had also tested the Beatles' patience during the White Album sessions. This single was an international hit, topping charts in Australia, Austria, Switzerland and West Germany, but was not released in Britain or the United States. (Note: "While My Guitar Gently Weeps" was listed with "Ob-La-Di, Ob-La-Da", as a double A-side, when the single topped Australia's Go-Set National Top 40 chart.)

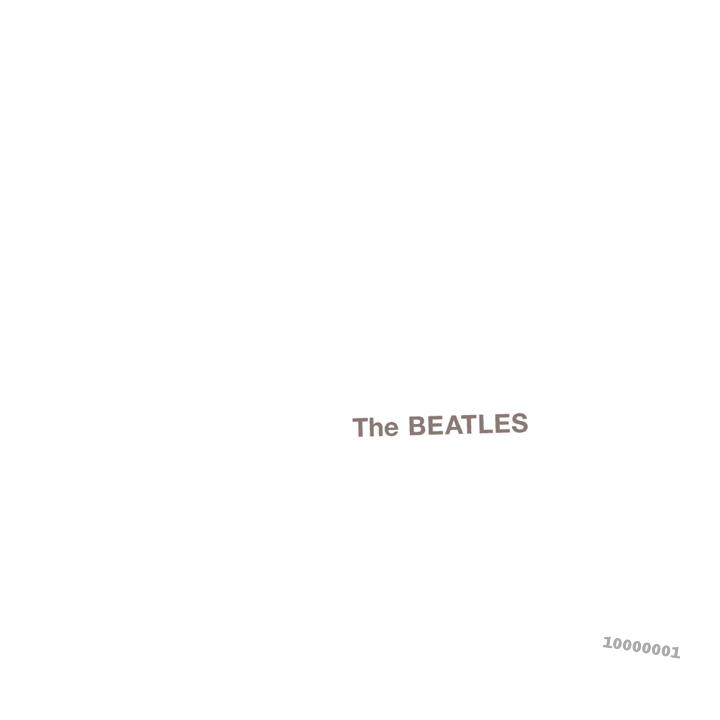
LP cover of The Beatles. Some music critics have recognised "While My Guitar Gently Weeps" as a highlight of the Beatles' 1968 double album.

Recalling the release in his 1977 book The Beatles Forever, Nicholas Schaffner said that, in returning to pop/rock songwriting after his excursions into the Indian classical style, Harrison's four White Album songs "firmly established him as a contender" beside Lennon and McCartney. In Schaffner's description, "While My Guitar Gently Weeps" was the most instantly popular of "a quartet of more conventionally accessible pop songs [written by Harrison] that many felt were among the finest on the album". (Note: According to music critic Tim Riley, Harrison's writing contributions "regain[ed] the promise" evident in his three songs on the Beatles' 1966 album Revolver.) According to Beatles historian Erin Torkelson Weber, the release of the White Album marked the start of a period when many observers began to consider his songs "equal to some of Lennon and McCartney's best compositions", a view that was heightened with his two contributions to the Beatles' 1969 album Abbey Road, "Something" and "Here Comes the Sun". New Yorker columnist Mark Hertsgaard, writing in his 1995 book A Day in the Life, said "While My Guitar Gently Weeps" was "the first great composition of George's career and perhaps the single most impressive song on the White Album".

Among contemporary reviews, Jann Wenner of Rolling Stone said that "While My Guitar Gently Weeps" was "one of George Harrison's very best songs", and likened it to "Blue Jay Way" in that it "recalls California, the simple Baja California beat, the dreamy words of the Los Angeles haze, the organic pace lapping around every room as if in invisible waves". Wenner found the lyrics "slightly self-righteous and preaching", representing "a general set of incidents, a message, like a sermon, impersonally directed to everyone", and concluded: "I am willing to bet something substantial that the lead guitarist on this cut is Eric Clapton, yet another involution of the circular logic on which this song [is] so superbly constructed as a musical piece." In his review for the International Times, Barry Miles said the song was a "great tune" with "nice hi-hats" but a "lifeless" guitar part.

Alan Smith of the NME credited the "warm voice" and "very strong melody" to McCartney and said that the track was one of the "highlights ... moving into a slightly Hendrix thing" and was bound to be "Another hit for somebody". Three weeks later, Smith acknowledged that the singer and composer was in fact Harrison, and added: "the words are evocative and the melody line is creeping into my mind to stay." Geoffrey Cannon wrote in The Guardian: "George Harrison has seen the truth, and is anxious that we should see our truth. He's a preacher, man of fire. When his songs speak of 'you', the address is direct. He achieves his character in 'While My Guitar Gently Weeps', which, with Phil Ochs's 'Tape from California', is the first track I know that succeeds in making magnanimous love serious and touching."

== Retrospective assessment and legacy ==
"While My Guitar Gently Weeps" became a staple of US rock radio during the early 1970s, on a par with songs such as "Layla" by Clapton's short-lived band Derek and the Dominos, Led Zeppelin's "Stairway to Heaven" and the Who's "Won't Get Fooled Again". In 1973, it appeared on the Beatles' double album compilation 1967–1970, as one of only three tracks representing the White Album. Capitol Records included it on The Best of George Harrison in 1976; a year before this, Harrison released a sequel to the song, titled "This Guitar (Can't Keep from Crying)", which also served as the final single issued by Apple in its original incarnation. The Beatles' recording appeared on the soundtrack to Withnail and I, a 1987 comedy film set in late-1960s London and produced by Harrison's company HandMade Films.

Writing for The Observer in 2004, Pete Paphides described "While My Guitar Gently Weeps" as "George Harrison's startling coming of age as a songwriter" and one of the few tracks that "pick themselves" when listeners attempt to edit the double album down to a single disc. In his book Revolution in the Head, Ian MacDonald was less impressed with the track, saying that it "exudes a browbeating self-importance which quickly becomes tiresome". McCartney identified it as one of his favourite selections on the 1995–96 Anthology outtakes series, and he grouped the song with "Something" and "Here Comes the Sun" as candidates for Harrison's "greatest track". Starr paired it with "Something" as "Two of the finest love songs ever written", adding: "they're really on a par with what John and Paul or anyone else of that time wrote." In their written tributes to Harrison following his death in November 2001, Mick Jagger and Keith Richards each expressed their admiration for the song. Jagger said: "It's lovely, plaintive. Only a guitar player could write that ..."

Rolling Stone ranked "While My Guitar Gently Weeps" 136th on its list of "The 500 Greatest Songs of All Time", seventh on the "100 Greatest Guitar Songs of All Time", and at number 10 on its list of "The Beatles 100 Greatest Songs". Clapton's performance was ranked 42nd in Guitar World's 2008 list of the "100 Greatest Guitar Solos". Among other critics' lists of the best Beatles songs, Paste magazine and Ultimate Classic Rock each ranked it at number 4, while Mojo placed it at number 17. In his commentary for the Mojo selection, English songwriter Chris Difford said that he had only come to fully appreciate the lyrics following Harrison's death in 2001; describing them as a "riposte" to Harrison's bandmates, particularly Lennon and McCartney, Difford added: "George was the one who came back from India with the spiritual awakening and carried it through to the rest of his life, whereas the others came back with the postcards." In 2018, the music staff of Time Out London ranked "While My Guitar Gently Weeps" 20th on their list of the best Beatles songs. Coinciding with the 50th anniversary of the White Album's release, Jacob Stolworthy of The Independent listed it at number 1 on his ranking of the album's 30 tracks. He said the song was "hands down one of The Beatles' greatest" and, having been conceived through "disharmony – in the world, as well as in the band he'd grown up with", "testament to Harrison's genius".

== Harrison live performances ==
Harrison played "While My Guitar Gently Weeps" at every one of his rare concerts as a solo artist. Writing for Mojo in 2003, Ashley Kahn attributed the track's "classic" status to its evocation of "a band falling out of harmony" and, with regard to the enduring musical bond between Harrison and Clapton, its standing as "their song". At Harrison's Concert for Bangladesh, held at Madison Square Garden in New York on 1 August 1971, Clapton performed the song on a Gibson Byrdland, a hollow-body guitar more suited to jazz or country music than rock. He later said that this was a poor decision and, as with his substandard playing at the event, one that was indicative of his descent into heroin addiction. In his entry for The Concert for Bangladesh in the book 1,000 Recordings to Hear Before You Die, Tom Moon nevertheless describes Clapton and Harrison's interplay as "one of the more thrilling two-man guitar explorations in rock", adding: "As they finish each other's thoughts, the two extend and amplify the song's intent: You haven't heard the full gamut of gentle (and not so) guitar weeping until you've heard this." (Note: The Concert for Bangladesh performance of the song was included on Harrison's 2009 compilation album Let It Roll.)

The version performed by Harrison during his brief set at the 1987 Prince's Trust Concert reunited him with Starr and Clapton, and features an extended coda with the guitars of Harrison and Clapton interweaving. On their 1991 tour of Japan, Harrison and Clapton performed "While My Guitar Gently Weeps" with additional background vocals. An edit combining parts of the 14 December and 17 December Tokyo Dome performances of the song was included on Harrison's 1992 double album Live in Japan.

Harrison also featured the song in the set list for his only other tour as a solo artist, a series of North American concerts over November–December 1974 with Ravi Shankar. Harrison shared the lead guitarist's role with Robben Ford, often extending the piece to eight minutes. While it was a popular inclusion in a set list that barely acknowledged Harrison's past as a former Beatle, his alteration of some of the lyrics – so that his guitar "gently smiles" and "tries to smile" – disappointed many concert-goers and reviewers. Author Simon Leng comments that on Harrison's return to Madison Square Garden towards the end of the tour, his playing on the song nevertheless received a standing ovation.

== Cover versions ==
Canadian guitarist Jeff Healey covered "While My Guitar Gently Weeps" on his 1990 album Hell to Pay. Harrison participated in the recording, contributing on acoustic guitar and backing vocals. Also issued as a single, Healey's version peaked at number 27 in Canada, number 85 in the UK and number 25 in New Zealand.

During the Golden Jubilee of Elizabeth II concert at Buckingham Palace Garden on 3 June 2002, McCartney performed the song with Clapton, as a tribute to Harrison. The performance appears on the DVD release Party at the Palace. On 29 November the same year, Clapton, backed by a large band that included McCartney, Starr, Dhani Harrison, Jeff Lynne and Marc Mann, performed "While My Guitar Gently Weeps" at the Concert for George in memory of Harrison. Author Ian Inglis writes that while Clapton was already "permanently associated" with "While My Guitar Gently Weeps" due to his presence on the White Album recording and the Concert for Bangladesh and Live in Japan versions, his long, closing solo at the Concert for George contained "perhaps the most expressive" playing of all those versions.

American musician Todd Rundgren covered "While My Guitar Gently Weeps" for the 2003 album Songs from the Material World: A Tribute to George Harrison. Rundgren said of his contribution to the multi-artist tribute: "[Before the Beatles], I'd never heard the term 'lead guitarist.' George created the job description for my first paying gig, the vocation that I'm still lucky enough to practice today …" Johnny Loftus of AllMusic views the recording as one of the collection's highlights, saying that Rundgren "effortlessly replicates the grandeur" of the Beatles' track. As his personal tribute to Harrison, Peter Frampton released a version of the song on his 2003 album Now.

In 2004, when Harrison was inducted posthumously into the Rock and Roll Hall of Fame as a solo artist, "While My Guitar Gently Weeps" was played in tribute by a large band that included Tom Petty, Jeff Lynne, Steve Winwood, Marc Mann, Dhani Harrison, Prince and Steve Ferrone. The performance concluded with a highly acclaimed extended guitar solo by Prince, who was also being inducted into the Hall of Fame.

Among other cover versions, the song has also been recorded by musicians such as Marc Ribot, Phish, Built to Spill, Charlie Byrd, and on ukulele by Jake Shimabukuro. Toto did a cover version for their album Through the Looking Glass and in a live performance in Live in Amsterdam. Santana did a cover for his twentieth album Guitar Heaven: The Greatest Guitar Classics of All Time, in 2010, featuring singer India Arie and cellist Yo-Yo Ma. Released as a single, it charted on Billboard's Adult Contemporary. A recording of the song by Regina Spektor appears in the 2016 film Kubo and the Two Strings.

== 2016 music video ==
In June 2016, Apple Corps and Cirque du Soleil released a music video for "While My Guitar Gently Weeps". The video was created for the tenth anniversary re-staging of Cirque du Soleil's Love theatrical production. The video was directed by Dandypunk, André Kasten and Leah Moyer. Ryan Reed, describing the clip for Rolling Stone, wrote that "Dandypunk's hand-drawn illustrations depict Harrison's lyrics falling off the page into the air, transporting LOVE performer Eira Glover into a series of fantastical locations. Projection mapping – and no CGI – was used to create the clip".

== Personnel ==
According to Ian MacDonald, Walter Everett and John C. Winn:

The Beatles

- George Harrison – double-tracked vocals, backing vocal, acoustic guitar, Hammond organ
- John Lennon – electric guitar with tremolo
- Paul McCartney – harmony vocal, piano, bass guitars (Note: According to Giles Martin (George Martin's son), Lennon played six-string bass on the track. In his 2012 autobiography, Ken Scott recalls "While My Guitar Gently Weeps" as being one of several songs on the White Album where the four-string bass is doubled by a six-string bass, and that the two basses were "always played together, and never overdubbed individually".)
- Ringo Starr – drums, tambourine, castanets

Additional musician

- Eric Clapton – lead guitar

== Certifications ==
| Region | Certification | Certified units/sales |
|---|---|---|
| New Zealand (RMNZ) | Platinum | 30,000^{‡} |
| United Kingdom (BPI) | Gold | 400,000^{‡} |
^{‡} Sales+streaming figures based on certification alone.

== Sources ==
- Allison, Dale C. Jr. (2006). The Love There That's Sleeping: The Art and Spirituality of George Harrison. New York, NY: Continuum. ISBN 978-0-8264-1917-0.
- Badman, Keith (2001). The Beatles Diary Volume 2: After the Break-Up 1970–2001. London: Omnibus Press. ISBN 978-0-7119-8307-6.
- The Beatles (2000). The Beatles Anthology. San Francisco, CA: Chronicle Books. ISBN 0-8118-2684-8.
- Castleman, Harry; Podrazik, Walter J. (1976). All Together Now: The First Complete Beatles Discography 1961–1975. New York, NY: Ballantine Books. ISBN 0-345-25680-8.
- Clapton, Eric (2007). Eric Clapton: The Autobiography. London: Century. ISBN 978-1-84605-309-2.
- The Editors of Rolling Stone (2002). Harrison. New York, NY: Rolling Stone Press. ISBN 978-0-7432-3581-5.
- Everett, Walter (1999). The Beatles as Musicians: Revolver Through the Anthology. New York, NY: Oxford University Press. ISBN 978-0-19-512941-0.
- Gould, Jonathan (2007). Can't Buy Me Love: The Beatles, Britain and America. London: Piatkus. ISBN 978-0-7499-2988-6.
- Greene, Joshua M. (2006). Here Comes the Sun: The Spiritual and Musical Journey of George Harrison. Hoboken, NJ: John Wiley & Sons. ISBN 978-0-470-12780-3.
- Harrison, George (2002). I, Me, Mine. San Francisco, CA: Chronicle Books. ISBN 978-0-8118-5900-4.
- Hertsgaard, Mark (1996). A Day in the Life: The Music and Artistry of the Beatles. London: Pan Books. ISBN 0-330-33891-9.
- Huntley, Elliot J. (2006). Mystical One: George Harrison – After the Break-up of the Beatles. Toronto, ON: Guernica Editions. ISBN 978-1-55071-197-4.
- Ingham, Chris (2006). The Rough Guide to the Beatles (2nd edn). London: Rough Guides. ISBN 978-1-84353-720-5.
- Inglis, Ian (2010). The Words and Music of George Harrison. Santa Barbara, CA: Praeger. ISBN 978-0-313-37532-3.
- Leng, Simon (2006). While My Guitar Gently Weeps: The Music of George Harrison. Milwaukee, WI: Hal Leonard. ISBN 978-1-4234-0609-9.
- Lewisohn, Mark (2005) [1988]. The Complete Beatles Recording Sessions: The Official Story of the Abbey Road Years 1962–1970. London: Bounty Books. ISBN 978-0-7537-2545-0.
- MacDonald, Ian (2005). Revolution in the Head: The Beatles' Records and the Sixties (2nd rev. edn). Chicago, IL: Chicago Review Press. ISBN 978-1-55652-733-3.
- Madinger, Chip; Easter, Mark (2000). Eight Arms to Hold You: The Solo Beatles Compendium. Chesterfield, MO: 44.1 Productions. ISBN 0-615-11724-4.
- Miles, Barry (2001). The Beatles Diary Volume 1: The Beatles Years. London: Omnibus Press. ISBN 0-7119-8308-9.
- Pedler, Dominic (2003). The Songwriting Secrets of the Beatles. London: Omnibus Press. ISBN 978-0-7119-8167-6.
- Quantick, David (2002). Revolution: The Making of the Beatles' White Album. Chicago, IL: A Cappella Books. ISBN 1-55652-470-6.
- Riley, Tim (2002) [1988]. Tell Me Why: A Beatles Commentary. Cambridge, MA: Da Capo Press. ISBN 978-0-306-81120-3.
- Rodriguez, Robert (2010). Fab Four FAQ 2.0: The Beatles' Solo Years, 1970–1980. Milwaukee, WI: Backbeat Books. ISBN 978-1-4165-9093-4.
- Schaffner, Nicholas (1978). The Beatles Forever. New York, NY: McGraw-Hill. ISBN 0-07-055087-5.
- Spizer, Bruce (2003). The Beatles on Apple Records. New Orleans, LA: 498 Productions. ISBN 0-9662649-4-0.
- Tillery, Gary (2011). Working Class Mystic: A Spiritual Biography of George Harrison. Wheaton, IL: Quest Books. ISBN 978-0-8356-0900-5.
- Unterberger, Richie (2006). The Unreleased Beatles: Music & Film. San Francisco, CA: Backbeat Books. ISBN 978-0-87930-892-6.
- Weber, Erin Torkelson (2016). The Beatles and the Historians: An Analysis of Writings About the Fab Four. Jefferson, NC: McFarland. ISBN 978-1-4766-6266-4.
- Winn, John C. (2009). That Magic Feeling: The Beatles' Recorded Legacy, Volume Two, 1966–1970. New York, NY: Three Rivers Press. ISBN 978-0-307-45239-9.
- Womack, Kenneth (2007). Long and Winding Roads: The Evolving Artistry of the Beatles. New York, NY: Continuum. ISBN 978-0-8264-1746-6.
- Womack, Kenneth (2014). The Beatles Encyclopedia: Everything Fab Four. Santa Barbara, CA: ABC-CLIO. ISBN 978-0-313-39171-2.
