= Sessions (Beatles album) =

Unreleased compilation album by The Beatles

- One of the proposed covers for the album

Compilation album by the Beatles
- Recorded: 1962–1969
- Length: 38:13
- Label: Apple
- Producer: George Martin

Singles from Sessions
- 1. ""Leave My Kitten Alone" / "Ob-La-Di, Ob-La-Da" (Take 5)" Released: Unreleased

Sessions is a cancelled compilation album of previously unreleased tracks by English rock band the Beatles, planned for release by EMI in 1985 but never issued officially, due to objections by the surviving Beatles. The album consists of 13 finished but unreleased Beatles songs. A planned single containing two of the tracks from Sessions – "Leave My Kitten Alone", backed with an alternative version of "Ob-La-Di, Ob-La-Da" – was also left unissued. The idea was resurrected in 1995 as the greatly expanded three-volume double CDs The Beatles Anthology with an accompanying six-hour documentary.

== Background ==
When the Beatles' contract with EMI had expired in 1976, the record company began to take stock of the band's back catalogue and look at the hundreds of hours of unreleased recordings stored in the Abbey Road Studio vaults. Over the next couple of years several compilation albums of previously released material would be issued (Rock 'n' Roll Music, Love Songs, The Beatles Ballads) and a live album of their Hollywood Bowl performances. An album of unreleased studio recordings was also considered, with a few attempts being abandoned.

In the early 1980s, while needing a task to distract him from his cancer treatment, Abbey Road Studios house engineer John Barrett was assigned the task of listening to and logging the studio's collection of multi-tracks and master tapes of the group. This research unearthed more previously unknown recordings. Some of these recordings were remixed for inclusion in the 1983 multi-media tour of Abbey Road Studios, titled The Beatles at Abbey Road.

A year after the Abbey Road show, in the summer of 1984, EMI began work on a compilation album of previously unreleased material. Former Beatles engineer Geoff Emerick was hired to remix and edit the recordings to a commercial standard. At the time, the album went under the in-house code name "Mary Jane" and the working titles Boots and One-Two-Three-Four before Sessions was settled upon.

The original release date of Sessions was to be November 1984, but EMI did not want to clash with Paul McCartney's Give My Regards to Broad Street soundtrack scheduled for release in late October, so the compilation was shelved. According to reports, McCartney later objected to the release of Sessions in its then current form, while George Harrison, joined by John Lennon's estate, objected to the album entirely. As a result, Sessions was cancelled indefinitely and the tracks did not appear on any official Beatles release until the Anthology project in 1995–96.

== Cover art ==
There were two proposed artworks for the cover, including one colour collage cover and one with a black and white photo of the group in an alley outside of Abbey Road Studios. In 2014, a complete slick set for the black and white cover was auctioned on eBay by well-known Beatles collector and dealer Perry Cox; the bidding stopped at US$2,910.00, which failed to meet the reserve. This was the complete artwork, including the front cover, the back cover, and the inner sleeve.

This was as far as production ever reached before the entire project was cancelled by EMI Records and no album was pressed for it.

== Final proposed track listing ==
All tracks are written by Lennon–McCartney, except where noted.

Side one
| No. | Title | Notes | Length |
|---|---|---|---|
| 1. | "Come and Get It" (McCartney) | Demo recording for Badfinger. Later officially released on Anthology 3 and the 50th Anniversary Edition of Abbey Road. Lead vocals: Paul McCartney | 2:30 |
| 2. | "Leave My Kitten Alone" (John/Turner/McDougal) | From the Beatles for Sale sessions. Officially released on Anthology 1. Lead vocals: John Lennon | 2:57 |
| 3. | "Not Guilty" (Harrison) | From The Beatles sessions. Edited down from the master takes original length for the Sessions album. This edit was officially released on Anthology 3, while the unedited version was released on the 2018 50th Anniversary Edition of The Beatles. Lead vocals: George Harrison | 3:22 |
| 4. | "I'm Looking Through You" | An early arrangement of the song from the Rubber Soul sessions. Officially released on Anthology 2. Lead vocals: McCartney | 2:54 |
| 5. | "What's the New Mary Jane" | From The Beatles sessions. Remixed from the original master take. This remix was officially released on Anthology 3. Lead vocals: Lennon | 6:12 |

Side two
| No. | Title | Notes | Length |
|---|---|---|---|
| 1. | "How Do You Do It?" (Murray) | Rejected follow-up single to "Love Me Do". Edited for the Sessions album. This edit was officially released on Anthology 1; mono. Lead vocals: Lennon and McCartney | 1:57 |
| 2. | "Besame Mucho" (Velázquez/Skylar) | Recording from the Beatles' first EMI session, with Pete Best on drums. Officially released on Anthology 1; mono. Lead vocals: McCartney | 2:37 |
| 3. | "One After 909" | Earlier version recorded 5 March 1963, an edit of Takes 4 & 5. This edit would be officially released on Anthology 1; mono. Lead vocals: Lennon and McCartney | 2:56 |
| 4. | "If You've Got Trouble" | A Help! outtake, with verses edited into a different order than they were originally recorded. The unedited version—at 2:48 minutes—would appear on Anthology 2. Lead vocals: Ringo Starr | 2:21 |
| 5. | "That Means a Lot" | From the Help! sessions. A remix of the first arrangement of the song. This mix was officially released on Anthology 2; mono. Lead vocals: McCartney | 2:27 |
| 6. | "While My Guitar Gently Weeps" (Harrison) | A demo recording from The Beatles sessions. The last guitar notes were looped to create a false ending. This edit was officially released on Anthology 3. Lead vocals: Harrison | 3:27 |
| 7. | "Mailman, Bring Me No More Blues" (Roberts/Katz/Clayton) | From the Let It Be sessions. Edited from original length. This edit would be officially released on Anthology 3. Lead vocals: Lennon | 1:56 |
| 8. | "Christmas Time (Is Here Again)" (Lennon/McCartney/Harrison/Starr) | An edited version of a song originally recorded for the 1967 Christmas fan club disc. A longer version—3:03 minutes—appeared officially on the B-side of the Free as a Bird single. The full length version, at 6:17 minutes, was never released, but the 6:06 fan club version [i.e. the 1967 Christmas Message] was commercially released in 2017 in the box set titled The Christmas Records. Lead vocals: Lennon, McCartney, Harrison and Starr | 2:42 |

- An early version of the album had "Christmas Time (Is Here Again)" edited into two parts and cross-fading at the beginning of the album into "Come and Get It" and at the end of the album from "Ob-La-Di, Ob-La-Da", the latter of which was cut from the album and planned to be released as a B-side.
- Some bootleg compact disc editions include "Ob-La-Di, Ob-La-Da" as a bonus track.

== See also ==
- Outline of the Beatles
- The Beatles timeline
