= Yellow Dog (bootlegger) =

European bootleg record label

Yellow Dog Records
- Founded: 1989
- Status: Defunct
- Genre: Rock
- Country of origin: Europe (1989-2002), Japan (1996-2006)

Yellow Dog was a prominent publisher of bootlegs by many prominent artists. The label released series such as "Unsurpassed Masters" (outtakes by many artists, including the Beatles and the Beach Boys) and "Day By Day" (the complete Beatles' "Get Back" sessions). This label has in turn been copied by many other bootleg labels, such as Kiss The Stone and Chapter One. Yellow Dog was shut down in Europe in 2002, but continued to run in Japan until 2006.

== Sublabels ==
Yellow Dog also maintained many sublabels:

1. Black Dog Records - Released titles similar to those released on Yellow Dog, lasted from 1992 to 2006
2. Cool Romeo - Released titles by Elvis Presley, only used in 2000
3. Dandelion - Released titles by the Rolling Stones and Bob Dylan, lasted from 1998 to 2001
4. Dumb Angel - Released titles like the Beach Boys, only used in 2000
5. Green Cat - Only released one CD in 2000
6. Hard Rain - Released a few titles, lasted from 1995 to 2000
7. Library Product - Mainly released Paul McCartney titles, only used in 2000
8. Midnight Beat - Primarily released Jimi Hendrix titles, but released many other titles as well, lasted from 1992 to 2002
9. Mistral Music - Released various titles from 1991 to 1994
10. Moonlight - Released titles by a various number of artists, lasted from 1990 to 1996
11. Orange - Released many titles in 2000
12. Rattle Snake - Released titles by the Rolling Stones and Bob Dylan. This label is still active
13. Sea Of Tunes - Released titles by the Beach Boys, lasted from 1997 to 2007
14. Sidewalk - Released titles by the Beatles and other artists in 2000
15. Strawberry Records - Released titles by the Beatles, lasted from 1988 to 2002
16. Yellow Cat Records - Released titles by a variety of artists, lasted from 1993 to 2005
