= Lucy (George Harrison guitar) =

Guitar of George Harrison

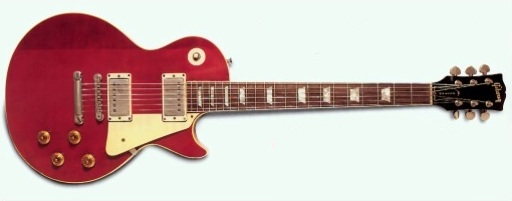
George's red Les Paul, Lucy, given to him by Eric Clapton.

"Lucy" is the name George Harrison of the Beatles gave to the unique red Gibson Les Paul guitar he received from Eric Clapton in August 1968. Also owned earlier by the rock guitarists John Sebastian and Rick Derringer, Lucy is one of the most famous electric guitars in the world.

== Background ==
Lucy was originally a "Goldtop" Les Paul Standard model with PAF humbucking pickups, a combination initially produced only in 1957 and part of 1958. Gibson records show that serial number 7-8789 was shipped from the factory in Kalamazoo, Michigan, on December 19, 1957.

== Provenance ==
=== John Sebastian, Rick Derringer ===
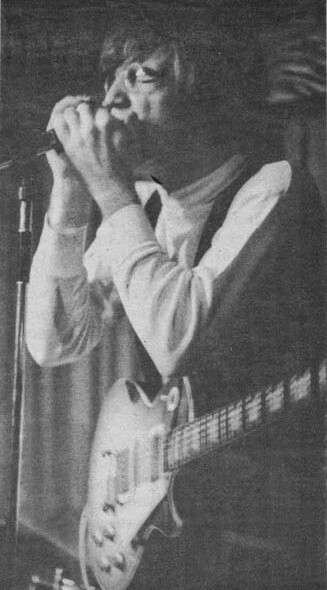
John Sebastian with the guitar in 1965, when the instrument still had its original gold finish

In 1965, the guitar was owned by John Sebastian of the Lovin' Spoonful, and the following year, he gave it to Rick Derringer of the McCoys. The guitar's original gold finish was worn and, according to Derringer: "It was a very, very used guitar, even when I got it ... so I figured that since we didn't live far from Gibson's factory in Kalamazoo, the next time the group went there I’d give it to Gibson and have it refinished. I had it done at the factory in the SG-style clear red finish that was popular at the time." After refinishing it, Derringer sold it to Dan Armstrong Guitars in Greenwich Village, New York.

=== Eric Clapton, George Harrison ===
The guitar had only been in Armstrong's shop for a few days when it was purchased by Eric Clapton. Clapton did not play this instrument much, his principal guitars in 1966–1968 being his psychedelic 1964 SG called "The Fool", a 1964 ES-335, a 1964 Gibson Reverse Firebird I, and a sunburst 1960 Les Paul he bought from Andy Summers. In August 1968 Clapton gave the red Les Paul as a present to his good friend George Harrison. Harrison dubbed the guitar "Lucy", after redhead comedian Lucille Ball.

Harrison and the Beatles were, in 1968, recording "the White Album", and had been working for several weeks on "While My Guitar Gently Weeps". Harrison had been unable to record a lead guitar part that he was satisfied with; moreover, Lennon and McCartney were dismissive of the song and "didn't try very hard". Knowing that his bandmates would be on good behaviour around a guest musician, Harrison invited Clapton to come into EMI Studios on September 6 and play on the song, telling him "you don't need to bring a guitar, you know I've got a good Les Paul you can use". Clapton joined the Beatles in the studio and they recorded 28 takes of the rhythm track (Ringo Starr on drums, Harrison on acoustic guitar, McCartney on piano, Lennon on organ, and Clapton playing Lucy). Take 25 was chosen as the final master, and overdubs were added at later sessions. The story that Clapton ceremoniously presented Harrison with the guitar after this session is a widely repeated myth.

Harrison continued to play Lucy as one of his principal guitars for the remainder of his time with the Beatles. It can be seen in the promotional videos for "Revolution" and “The Ballad of John and Yoko”, and the 1970 Let It Be documentary film. Lucy can also be heard during the three-way guitar solo near the end of "The End".

== See also ==
- List of guitars

== Sources ==
- Babiuk, Andy (2002). Beatles Gear: All the Fab Four's Instruments from Stage to Studio (Second revised ed.). San Francisco, California: Backbeat Books. ISBN 0-87930-731-5.
- Lawrence, Robb (2008). The Early Years of the Les Paul Legacy: 1915–1963. New York City: Hal Leonard Books. ISBN 978-0-634-04861-6 – via the Internet Archive.
