= What's the New Mary Jane =

1969 song by the Beatles

Song by the Beatles

from the album Anthology 3
- Released: 28 October 1996
- Recorded: 14 August 1968, 26 November 1969
- Studio: EMI, London
- Genre: Experimental
- Length: 6:12 (released version)
- Label: Apple Records
- Songwriter: Lennon–McCartney
- Producer: George Martin

"What's the New Mary Jane" is a song written by John Lennon (credited to Lennon–McCartney) and performed by the English rock band the Beatles. Composed during the Beatles' retreat to Rishikesh, India in early 1968, it was recorded in August of that year, during sessions for the double album The Beatles (also known as "the White Album"), but was omitted from the album's running order during its final banding session. The song features Beatles band members Lennon and George Harrison, as well as Lennon's future wife Yoko Ono and Beatles assistant Mal Evans.

Lennon resurrected the song in November 1969, when he and Ono added further overdubs with the intent to issue it as a single credited to Plastic Ono Band, although the release was ultimately put on hold. The song remained unreleased until the archival Beatles compilation Anthology 3 in 1996.

== Background and composition ==
"What's the New Mary Jane" was part of a large quantity of songs written by the Beatles during their stay in Rishikesh, India in early 1968 and features a discordant melody and surreal lyrics containing multiple references to India. Although credited to Lennon–McCartney, it was composed solely by John Lennon. In a 1969 interview with NME, Lennon also credited friend and head of Apple Electronics, Magic Alex, with writing half of the song, though this credit was later revoked without explanation.

"What's the New Mary Jane" also demonstrated the new influence of Yoko Ono on Lennon's music. After Lennon had returned from his India trip, he began an extramarital affair with Ono and created a number of experimental home recordings with her. The first of these would eventually be issued in November 1968 as the LP Unfinished Music No. 1: Two Virgins, but the two continued this experimentation throughout sessions for the Beatles' next album, The Beatles (1968), with "What's the New Mary Jane" and "Revolution 9".

Rolling Stone writer Jordan Runtagh later described the song as "one part nursery rhyme, one part musique concrète", concluding that it was "at times frightening" but that it also demonstrated "the band's fundamental humor".

== Recording ==
=== Demo ===
An early acoustic demo of the song was recorded in late May 1968 at Kinfauns, George Harrison's bungalow in Esher, along with 26 other songs intended for The Beatles (also known as "the White Album"). The demo featured Lennon singing an octave higher than the later studio version and switching the words "cooking" and "groovy" in the second verse. Another member of the Beatles can also be heard shouting, "What's the new Mary Jane? Oh, my goodness," near the end of the demo.

=== Studio ===
The studio version of the song was recorded on 14 August 1968, during the recording sessions for The Beatles. This version was significantly longer than the original demo, with the addition of tape loops, sound effects and vocalizations expanding it from two and a half minutes to over six minutes. Lennon and George Harrison are the only band members who appear on the track, with Lennon on piano and vocals and Harrison on guitar. Ono and Mal Evans also contributed vocals and percussion. Four takes were recorded, with the final take, totaling over six and a half minutes, being marked as best, after which Lennon added a second vocal and piano and Harrison added another acoustic guitar. The track ends with Lennon commenting, "Let's hear it, before we get taken away!" A short mono mix lasting 3:15 was taken home by Lennon.

The song was later remixed in mono on 26 September, along with "Glass Onion", "Happiness Is a Warm Gun" and "I Will", and in stereo on 14 October. The final running order for The Beatles was sequenced and assembled by Lennon, Paul McCartney, producer George Martin and engineers Ken Scott and John Smith on 16 October, and while Lennon had wanted both of his experimental tracks to appear on the album, only "Revolution 9" made the final cut. According to author Mark Lewisohn, the song was omitted from the album "very much at the last minute owing to lack of space, and, very probably, peer pressure."

Lennon later sought to issue it as a Plastic Ono Band single in December 1969, backed with another then-unreleased Beatles song, "You Know My Name (Look Up the Number)". On 11 September of that year, he enlisted engineer Malcolm Davies to produce three new stereo remixes of "What's the New Mary Jane" for his review.

On 26 November, Lennon and Ono recorded additional vocals and sound effects for the track and oversaw multiple different mixes and edits thereof, with Lennon co-producing the session with Geoff Emerick. Lennon also edited "You Know My Name" down from 6:08 to 4:19, which he felt was a more suitable length for the A-side of the single. While the single was scheduled for release on 5 December and was even issued the catalog number APPLES 1002, its release was put on hold on 1 December and was never removed. However, "You Know My Name" was eventually issued as the B-side of the Beatles' "Let It Be" single in 1970.

== Release ==
On 27 September 1974, Lennon was a guest DJ on 93 KHJ (AM) in Los Angeles and received a call from a fan requesting that the song be played on air. Lennon expressed surprise that the fan had heard it and explained that he didn't have it and could not play it. The caller asked who appeared on the track, to which Lennon replied, "It's me, George and Yoko, actually [...] out of our minds on the floor of EMI one day. And it's a wonderful song, you'll hear it one day. We'll put it out on one of those repackages."

The song was remixed by Emerick in 1984 for inclusion on the aborted album Sessions. Lennon's original mono mix acetate was later featured in episode 140 of the radio show The Lost Lennon Tapes. The song was not made available until 1996, when it was issued on Anthology 3. The much shorter first take of the song, without the sound effects added by Lennon and Ono, was later included on the 50th anniversary reissue of The Beatles in 2018, along with the May 1968 demo.

== Personnel ==
Personnel per The Beatles Bible, except where indicated.

- John Lennon – lead vocals, piano, tambourine, effects
- George Harrison – vocals, acoustic guitar, percussion, effects
- Yoko Ono – vocals, percussion, effects (Swanee whistle, football rattle, ripping paper percussion)
- Mal Evans – handbell, effects

== Notes ==
=== Bibliography ===
- Spizer, Bruce (2018). The Beatles White Album and the Launch of Apple. New York: Imagine Wonder. ISBN 9 781637 610039.
- Lewisohn, Mark (1988). The Beatles Recording Sessions. New York: Harmony Books. ISBN 0-517-58182-5.
