= Leave My Kitten Alone =

1959 single by Little Willie John

Single by Little Willie John
- B-side: "Let Nobody Love You"
- Released: June 1959
- Genre: R&B
- Length: 2:32
- Label: King
- Songwriters: Little Willie John, Titus Turner, James McDougal

Little Willie John singles chronology
"Made for Me" (1959)	"Leave My Kitten Alone" (1959)	"Let Them Talk" (1959)

"Leave My Kitten Alone" is a song written by Little Willie John, Titus Turner, and James McDougal, first recorded by Little Willie John and released in 1959 as a single through King Records. It is an R&B song that follows a 24-bar blues format.

== Little Willie John version ==
The original version of the song, by Little Willie John, on King Records, reached No. 13 on the Billboard R&B chart and No. 60 on the pop chart on its first release in 1959. A second release again reached No. 60, after cover version by Johnny Preston reached No. 73 on the singles chart in early 1961. Over the intervening decades, numerous covers have been recorded, in different musical genres, sometimes with altered lyrics.

== The Beatles version ==
On August 14, 1964, during the recording sessions for Beatles for Sale, the Beatles recorded five takes of "Leave My Kitten Alone", adding overdubs to the last take. The song was never mixed and was not included on Beatles for Sale.

"Leave My Kitten Alone"

Song by the Beatles

from the album Anthology 1
- Released: 20 November 1995
- Recorded: 14 August 1964
- Studio: EMI, London
- Genre: Rock and roll, R&B
- Length: 2:57
- Songwriters: Little Willie John, Titus Turner, James McDougal
- Producer: George Martin

The song was remixed in 1982 by John Barrett in preparation for The Beatles at Abbey Road, a video presentation shown as part of a public tour of the Abbey Road Studios the following year. It was again remixed in 1984 by Geoff Emerick in preparation for inclusion on the unreleased Sessions project. In 1994, Emerick remixed the song yet again, this time for the Anthology project; it finally saw official release on the project's first volume the following year.

== Other covers ==
Elvis Costello and the Attractions recorded a cover of "Leave My Kitten Alone" in 1986 during the sessions for Blood & Chocolate. It was left off the album; Costello latter included a quieter version of the song on his 1995 solo album Kojak Variety. This version was released half a year before the Beatles released their version and seven years before Costello's version with the Attractions was released on the 2002 Rhino Records reissue of Blood and Chocolate. In a review for the reissue, Kent Benjamin of Goldmine referred to Costello's rendition as one of his best covers and "finest rockers". It was also praised by AllMusic's Stephen Thomas Erlewine. Costello himself admitted in the 2002 reissue's liner notes that it should have been included in the original album.
