= List of people who performed on Beatles recordings =

Aside from John Lennon, Paul McCartney, George Harrison and Ringo Starr, numerous musicians and other people featured on official recordings by the Beatles. These include friends and family of the group, the band's entourage, and numerous session musicians. Original members Pete Best (drums) and Stuart Sutcliffe (bass guitar) appeared on early recordings; the former on the group's recording of "My Bonnie" with Tony Sheridan, and both on various tracks released on Anthology 1.

The instruments contributed to Beatles recordings range from traditional orchestral instruments—such as violin, viola and cello—to an alarm clock and a pile of gravel.

The first half of the Beatles' career—from the early 1960s until 1966—rarely saw the band use any extra musicians, though George Martin (their producer) occasionally added keyboard instruments to augment their sound. As their career progressed and their influences widened, the group began to experiment in the studio. Martin started to orchestrate for the band; his first major orchestration for the group was the string quartet on "Yesterday". In 1966, the band stopped touring and concentrated on studio experimentation, creating soundscapes and orchestrations that required numerous musicians (the orchestra on 1967's "A Day in the Life" was accommodated in Abbey Road's large Studio One, rather than the group's usual room in Studio Two). It was also around this time that the Beatles visited India, and—particularly Harrison—became influenced by Indian culture and music, leading to the group's use of traditional Indian instruments in their arrangements. Shortly before the group's demise at the end of the decade, keyboardist Billy Preston was brought in to add to their sound while they tried to return to their rock 'n' roll roots. The group wanted what was to become their final album, Let It Be, to be raw with minimal overdubs. After producer Glyn Johns left the project, Phil Spector hired in numerous session musicians to provide orchestral overdubs, in contrast to the group's original back-to-basics ideas.

== Omissions ==
Session musicians' names and roles for some performances were not recorded or have been lost—this is the case for the recordings of "Good Night" and "Yellow Submarine"; Phil Spector's orchestral overdubs for "The Long and Winding Road", "Across the Universe" and "I Me Mine"; the string sections on "Something", "Here Comes the Sun", "Carry That Weight", "Golden Slumbers" and "The End"; the orchestra on "Hey Jude"; the saxophonists on "Ob-La-Di, Ob-La-Da"; the trumpeters and trombonists on "Mother Nature's Son"; the brass and string players on "Let It Be"; the cellist on "Blue Jay Way" and the Asian Music Circle musicians on "Love You To" (performing on sitar and tambura) and "Within You Without You" (performing on dilruba, swarmandal, tabla and tambura).

In February 1978, session drummer Bernard Purdie claimed that he had overdubbed drums for 21 Beatles recordings in the summer of 1963, the veracity of which remaining unsubstantiated. He stated that Brian Epstein paid him a five-figure sum to overdub a drum track at Capitol Records' West 46th Street studios in New York City, and that the payment also bought his silence. Purdie has also implied that some guitar parts for early Beatles recordings were also overdubbed, and there are also suggestions that Purdie and Cornell Dupree overdubbed drums and guitar parts for the Tony Sheridan recordings. His claim was repeated in Max Weinberg's 1984 book The Big Beat: Conversations with Rock's Greatest Drummers, where he refused to name which songs he had played on and stated that "Ringo never played on anything [...] not the early Beatles stuff." Barry Miles wrote that Purdie was hired in 1962 to replace Pete Best's drumming from some of the band's recording sessions that had taken place in Hamburg.

Also omitted from this list are the instances where people's voices are captured on the recordings, but do not constitute part of the musical performance, such as Geoff Emerick's announcement of "take two" at the beginning of "Revolution 1", and the various announcers, interviewers and presenters on Live at the BBC.

Jimmie Nicol stood in for Starr for eight performances during the band's 1964 tour. He did not feature on record, but his performances were captured by audience bootlegs and broadcasts by AVRO in the Netherlands and 5DN in Australia.

== Indirect performances ==
By the mid-1960s, the Beatles became interested in tape loops and found sounds. Early examples of the group sampling existing recordings include loops on "Revolution 9" (the repetitive "number nine" is from a Royal Academy of Music examination tape, some chatter is from a conversation between George Martin and Apple office manager Alistair Taylor, and a chord from a recording of Sibelius's Symphony No. 7 is also included) and "I Am the Walrus", which contained a radio broadcast of the BBC Third Programme's production of King Lear. The part of the broadcast included on the record features John Hollis as Oswald, John Rye as Edgar, and Brewster Mason as the Earl of Gloucester.

For the introduction to "The Continuing Story of Bungalow Bill", a stock Mellotron sample of a Spanish guitar was used. The recording, performed by an unknown guitarist, was supervised by Eric Robinson.

== A ==
- Frederick Alexander—cellist; session musician. Contributed cello to "Martha My Dear"
- Peggie Allen—vocalist; session musician and member of the Mike Sammes Singers. Contributed vocals to "I Am the Walrus"
- Jane Asher—Paul McCartney's then-girlfriend. Contributed vocals to "All You Need Is Love"
- Neil Aspinall—the group's road manager and business partner. Contributed guiro to "Strawberry Fields Forever" and vocals to "Yellow Submarine"

== B ==
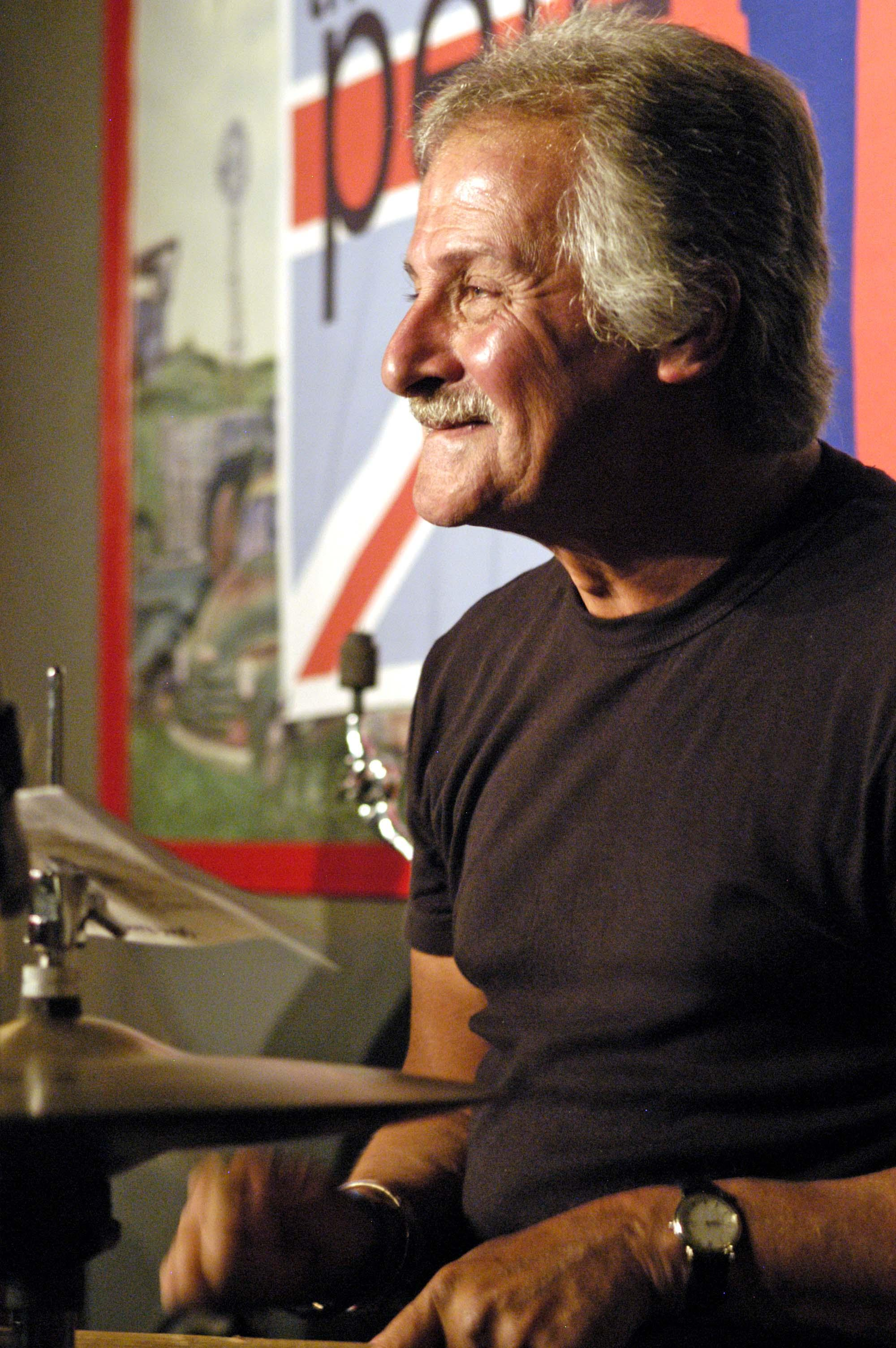
Pete Best in 2006

- Mia Barcia-Colombo–cellist; session musician. Contributed cello to "Now and Then"
- Ted Barker—trombonist; session musician. Contributed trombone to "Martha My Dear"
- Michael Barnes—tuba player; session musician. Contributed tuba to "A Day in the Life"
- Ken Barrie—vocalist; session musician and member of the Mike Sammes Singers. Contributed vocals to "Good Night"
- Peter Beavan—cellist; session musician. Contributed cello to "Within You Without You"
- Lionel Bentley—violinist; session musician. Contributed violin to "A Day in the Life"
- Pete Best—drummer; original member. Contributed drums to "Ain't She Sweet", "Bésame Mucho", "Cry for a Shadow", "Hello Little Girl", "Like Dreamers Do", "Love Me Do", "My Bonnie", "Searchin'", "The Sheik of Araby", and "Three Cool Cats" on Anthology 1
- Anil Bhagwat—tabla player; session musician. Contributed tabla to "Love You To"
- Leo Birnbaum—violist; session musician. Contributed viola to "Hello, Goodbye" and "Martha My Dear"
- Charlie Bisharat–violinist; session musician. Contributed violin to "Now and Then"
- Greg Bowen—trumpeter; session musician. Contributed trumpet to "Strawberry Fields Forever"
- Eric Bowie—violinist; session musician. Contributed violin to "All You Need Is Love", "Glass Onion" and "Piggies"
- Pattie Boyd—George Harrison's wife from 1966 until after the Beatles' split. Contributed vocals to "All You Need Is Love", "Birthday" and "Yellow Submarine"
- Desmond Bradley—violinist; session musician. Contributed violin to "A Day in the Life"
- Alan Branscombe—saxophonist; session musician. Contributed tenor saxophone to "Got to Get You into My Life"
- Lizzie Bravo—vocalist; Apple scruff. Contributed vocals to "Across the Universe"
- Jack Bremer—clarinettist; session musician. Contributed clarinet to "A Day in the Life"
- Sheila Bromberg—harpist; session musician. Contributed harp to "She's Leaving Home"
- Raymond Brown—trombonist; session musician. Contributed trombone to "A Day in the Life"
- James W. Buck—horn player; session musician. Contributed French horn to "Sgt. Pepper's Lonely Hearts Club Band"
- Caroline Buckman–violist; session musician. Contributed viola to "Now and Then"
- Andrew Bulbrook–violinist; session musician. Contributed violin to "Now and Then"
- John Burden—horn player; session musician. Contributed French horn to "Sgt. Pepper's Lonely Hearts Club Band"
- Robert Burns—clarinettist; session musician. Contributed clarinet to "When I'm Sixty-Four"

== C ==
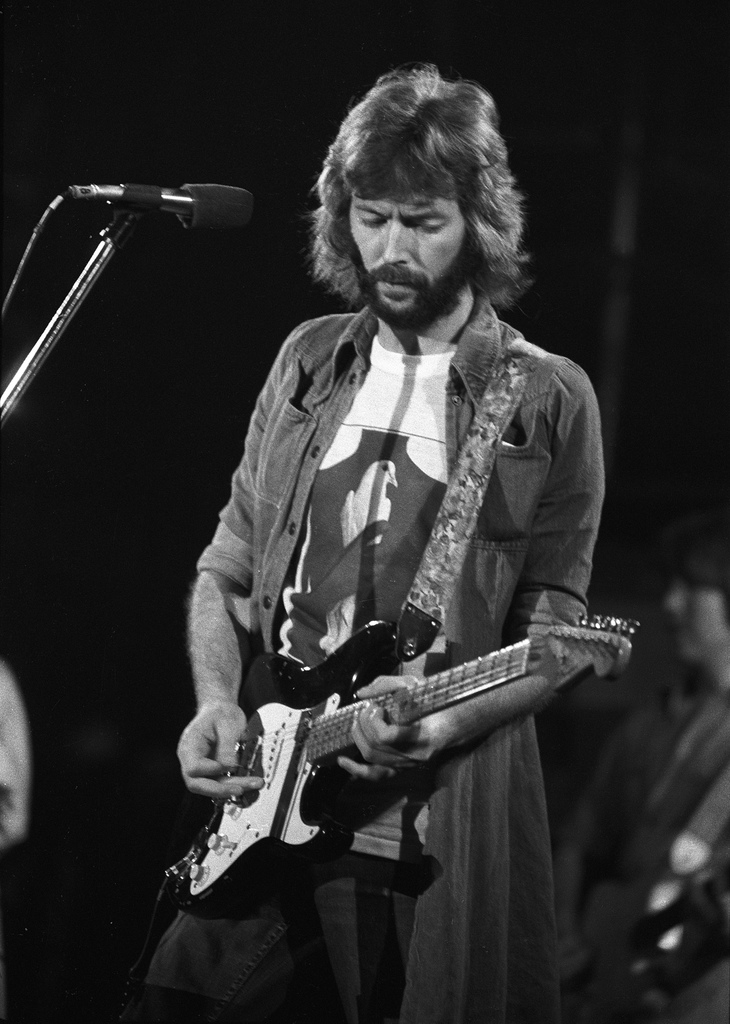
Eric Clapton in 1975

- Leon Calvert—trumpeter; session musician. Contributed trumpet and flugelhorn to "Martha My Dear" and trumpet to "Penny Lane"
- Barrie Cameron—saxophonist; session musician. Contributed saxophone to "Good Morning Good Morning"
- Duncan Campbell—trumpeter; session musician. Contributed trumpet to "Penny Lane"
- Ronald Chamberlain—saxophonist; session musician. Contributed saxophone to "Honey Pie"
- Hariprasad Chaurasia—flautist; session musician. MacDonald credits the shehnai on "The Inner Light" to Chaurasia or S. R. Kenkare
- Jim Chester—saxophonist; session musician. Contributed saxophone to "Honey Pie"
- Alan Civil—horn player; session musician. Contributed French horn to "A Day in the Life" and "For No One"
- Eric Clapton—guitarist and then-member of Cream. Contributed vocals to "All You Need Is Love" and electric guitar to "While My Guitar Gently Weeps".
- Frank Clarke—bassist; session musician. Contributed double bass to "Penny Lane"
- Freddy Clayton—trumpeter; session musician. Contributed trumpet to "Penny Lane" and trumpet to "Revolution 1"
- Giovanna Clayton–cellist; session musician. Contributed cello to "Now and Then"
- Peter Coe—saxophonist; session musician. Contributed tenor saxophone to "Got to Get You into My Life"
- Derek Collins—saxophonist; session musician. Contributed tenor saxophone to "Savoy Truffle"
- Les Condon—trumpeter; session musician. Contributed trumpet to "Got to Get You into My Life"
- Roy Copestake—trumpeter; session musician. Contributed trumpet to "Magical Mystery Tour"
- Bert Courtley—trumpeter; session musician. Contributed trumpet and flugelhorn to "Penny Lane"
- Keith Cummings—violist; session musician. Contributed viola to "Glass Onion" and "Piggies"

== D ==
- Fred Dachtler—vocalist; session musician and member of the Mike Sammes Singers. Contributed vocals to "I Am the Walrus"
- Alan Dalziel—cellist; session musician. Contributed cello to "A Day in the Life" and "She's Leaving Home"
- Hunter Davies—journalist. Contributed vocals to "All You Need Is Love"
- Bernard Davis—violist; session musician. Contributed viola to "A Day in the Life"
- Henry Datyner—violinist; session musician. Contributed violin to "A Day in the Life", "Glass Onion" and "Piggies"
- June Day—vocalist; session musician and member of the Mike Sammes Singers. Contributed vocals to "I Am the Walrus"
- Rijram Desad—harmonium player; session musician. Contributed harmonium to "The Inner Light"
- Donovan—folk singer-songwriter. Contributed vocals to "Yellow Submarine"

== E ==
- Rose Eccles—wife of Graham Nash. Contributed vocals "All You Need Is Love"
- Gwynne Edwards—violist; session musician. Contributed viola to "A Day in the Life"
- Art Ellefson—saxophonist; session musician. Contributed tenor saxophone to "Savoy Truffle"
- Jack Ellory—flautist; session musician. Contributed flute to "The Fool on the Hill"
- Ralph Elman—violinist; session musician. Contributed violin to "I Am the Walrus" and "Within You Without You"
- Jack Emblow—accordionist; session musician. Contributed accordion to "All You Need Is Love"
- Geoff Emerick—one of the group's engineers. Contributed vocals to "Yellow Submarine"
- Ken Essex—violist; session musician. Contributed viola to "Hello, Goodbye" and "Yesterday"
- Mal Evans—the group's road manager. Contributed harmonica to "Being for the Benefit of Mr. Kite"; alarm clock and piano to "A Day in the Life"; hand claps to "Dear Prudence" and "Birthday"; trumpet to "Helter Skelter", anvil to "Maxwell's Silver Hammer"; handbell to "What's the New Mary Jane"; tambourine to "Strawberry Fields Forever"; bass drum and vocals to "Yellow Submarine"; a pile of gravel dug with a shovel to "You Know My Name (Look Up the Number)"; and Hammond organ to "You Won't See Me"

== F ==
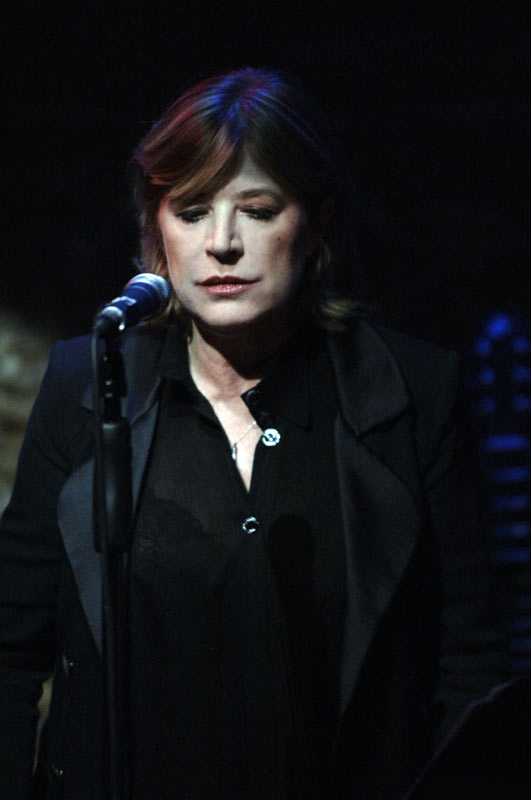
Marianne Faithfull in 2008

- Marianne Faithfull—pop singer. Contributed vocals to "All You Need Is Love" and "Yellow Submarine"
- Jack Fallon—violinist; session musician. Contributed violin to "Don't Pass Me By"
- Norman Fawcett—bassoonist; session musician. Contributed bassoon to "A Day in the Life"
- Niall Ferguson–cellist; session musician. Contributed cello to "Now and Then"
- Tony Fisher—trumpeter; session musician. Contributed trumpet to "Strawberry Fields Forever"
- Allen Ford—cellist; session musician. Contributed cello to "Within You Without You"
- Drew Forde–violist; session musician. Contributed viola to "Now and Then"
- Eldon Fox—cellist; session musician. Contributed cello to "Glass Onion", "I Am the Walrus" and "Piggies"
- J. Fraser—vocalist; session musician and member of the Mike Sammes Singers. Contributed vocals to "I Am the Walrus"
- Tristan Fry—percussionist; session musician. Contributed percussion and timpani to "A Day in the Life"

== G ==
- Francesc Gabarró Solé—cellist; session musician. Contributed cello to "A Day in the Life" and "Yesterday"
- Julien Gaillard—violinist; session musician. Contributed violin to "Within You Without You"
- Jose Luis Garcia—violinist; session musician. Contributed violin to "She's Leaving Home"
- Hans Geiger—violinist; session musician. Contributed violin to "A Day in the Life"
- Bernard George—saxophonist; session musician. Contributed baritone saxophone to "Savoy Truffle"
- Sharad Ghosh—shehnai player; session musician. MacDonald credits the shehnai on "The Inner Light" to Ghosh or Hanuman Jadev
- Tony Gilbert—violinist; session musician. Contributed violin to "Eleanor Rigby" and "Yesterday"
- Ross Gilmour—vocalist; session musician and member of the Mike Sammes Singers. Contributed vocals to "Good Night"
- David Glyde—saxophonist; session musician. Contributed saxophone to "Good Morning Good Morning"
- Phil Goody—flautist; session musician. Contributed flute to "Penny Lane"
- Allan Grant—vocalist; session musician and member of the Mike Sammes Singers. Contributed vocals to "I Am the Walrus"
- Jack Greene—violinist; session musician. Contributed violin to "I Am the Walrus" and "Within You Without You"
- D. Griffiths—vocalist; session musician and member of the Mike Sammes Singers. Contributed vocals to "I Am the Walrus"
- Erich Gruenberg—violinist; session musician. Contributed violin to "A Day in the Life", "She's Leaving Home" and "Within You Without You"

== H ==
- Patrick Hailing—violinist; session musician. Contributed violin to "All You Need Is Love"
- John Hall—cellist; session musician. Contributed cello to "Strawberry Fields Forever"
- Ian Hamer—trumpeter; session musician. Contributed trumpet to "Got to Get You into My Life"
- Neel Hammond–violinist; session musician. Contributed violin to "Now and Then"
- George Harrison—aside from contributing vocals and guitar (both acoustic and electric), Harrison also contributed bass guitar, organ, Moog synthesizer, harmonium, vibraphone, harmonica, sitar, tambura, violin, percussion (including hand claps, finger clicks, maracas, African drum and drums) and comb and paper; Ian MacDonald suggests Harrison may also have contributed tambourine, ukulele and harpsichord
- Ayvren Harrison–violist; session musician. Contributed viola to "Now and Then"
- Jurgen Hess—violinist; session musician. Contributed violin to "A Day in the Life" and "Eleanor Rigby"
- Alan Holmes—saxophonist; session musician. Contributed saxophone to "Good Morning Good Morning"
- Jack Holmes—violinist; session musician. Contributed violin to "All You Need Is Love"
- Don Honeywill—saxophonist; session musician. Contributed tenor saxophone to "All You Need Is Love"
- Nicky Hopkins—keyboardist; session musician. Contributed electric piano to "Revolution"
- Wendy Horan—vocalist; session musician and member of the Mike Sammes Singers. Contributed vocals to "I Am the Walrus"
- Elgar Howarth—trumpeter; session musician. Contributed trumpet to "Magical Mystery Tour"
- Ronnie Hughes—trumpeter; session musician. Contributed trumpet to "Martha My Dear"

== J ==
- Derek Jacobs—violinist; session musician. Contributed violin to "She's Leaving Home"
- Bill Jackman—flautist and saxophonist; session musician. Contributed flute, vocals and hand claps to "Hey Jude" and tenor saxophone to "Lady Madonna"
- Harold Jackson—trumpeter; session musician. Contributed trumpet to "A Day in the Life"
- Hanuman Jadev—shehnai player; session musician. MacDonald credits the shehnai on "The Inner Light" to Jadev or Sharad Ghosh
- Mick Jagger—singer and member of The Rolling Stones. Contributed vocals to "All You Need Is Love"
- John Jezzard—violinist; session musician. Contributed violin to "I Am the Walrus"
- Brian Jones—member of The Rolling Stones. Contributed vocals to "Yellow Submarine" and alto saxophone to "You Know My Name (Look Up the Number)"
- Granville Jones—violinist; session musician. Contributed violin to "A Day in the Life"
- Norman Jones—cellist; session musician. Contributed cello to "Eleanor Rigby" and "Strawberry Fields Forever"

== K ==
- S. R. Kenkare—flautist; session musician. MacDonald credits the shehnai on "The Inner Light" to Kenkare or Hariprasad Chaurasia
- Aashish Khan—sarod player; session musician. Contributed sarod to "The Inner Light"
- Reginald Kilbey—cellist; session musician. Contributed cello to "Glass Onion", "Martha My Dear", "Piggies" and "Within You Without You"
- Irene King—vocalist; session musician and member of the Mike Sammes Singers. Contributed vocals to "Good Night" and "I Am the Walrus"
- Sylvia King—vocalist; session musician and member of the Mike Sammes Singers. Contributed vocals to "I Am the Walrus"
- Harry Klein—saxophonist; session musician. Contributed saxophone to "Honey Pie" and baritone saxophone to "Lady Madonna" and "Savoy Truffle"
- Bobby Kok—cellist; session musician. Contributed cello, vocals and hand claps to "Hey Jude"
- Eddie Kramer—engineer. Contributed vibraphone to "Baby You're a Rich Man"

== L ==
- Don Lang—trombonist; session musician. Contributed trombone to "Revolution 1"
- John Lee—trombonist; session musician. Contributed trombone to "Good Morning Good Morning"
- Songa Lee–violinist; session musician. Contributed violin to "Now and Then"
- Gary Leeds—musician and member of The Walker Brothers. Contributed vocals to "All You Need Is Love"
- John Lennon—aside from vocals and guitar (both electric and acoustic) on numerous recordings, Lennon contributed instruments such as piano, electric piano, organ, harpsichord, harmonium, Mellotron, Moog synthesizer, clavioline, harmonica, banjo, ukulele, bass guitar, lap steel guitar, percussion (including maracas, cowbell, bongos, congas, maracas, hand claps, finger clicks, tambourine, and drums), comb and paper, and tenor saxophone; Ian MacDonald also suggests that Lennon may have also contributed Jew's harp and glockenspiel
- Norman Lenderman—violinist; session musician. Contributed violin to "Glass Onion" and "Piggies"
- Gordon Lewins—clarinettist; session musician. Contributed clarinet to "I Am the Walrus"
- Jackie Lomax—guitarist and singer; Apple Records artist. Contributed hand claps to "Dear Prudence"
- Roger Lord—oboist; session musician. Contributed oboe to "A Day in the Life"
- Alan Loveday—violinist; session musician. Contributed violin to "Within You Without You"
- Fred Lucas—vocalist; session musician and member of the Mike Sammes Singers. Contributed vocals to "Good Night" and "I Am the Walrus"
- Jeff Lynne—producer ("Free as a Bird", "Real Love", and "Now and Then" (Note: Production of Lynne's version of "Now and Then" was aborted and not finished for inclusion with The Beatles Anthology, although Lynne's 1995 sessions were used by McCartney and Giles Martin for the song's 2023 release.)). Contributed vocals and guitar to "Real Love".

== M ==
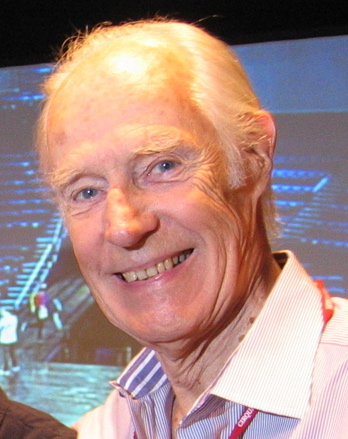
George Martin in 2006

- Cyril MacArthur—bassist; session musician. Contributed double bass to "A Day in the Life"
- Henry MacKenzie—clarinettist; session musician. Contributed clarinet to "When I'm Sixty-Four"
- Les Maddox—violinist; session musician. Contributed violin to "Martha My Dear"
- G. Mallen—vocalist; session musician and member of the Mike Sammes Singers. Contributed vocals to "I Am the Walrus"
- John Marson—harpist; session musician. Contributed harp to "A Day in the Life"
- Bram Martin—cellist; session musician. Contributed cello to "I Am the Walrus"
- George Martin—the group's producer. Contributed piano to "A Hard Day's Night", "All You Need Is Love", "Getting Better", "Good Day Sunshine", "In My Life", "Long Tall Sally", "Lovely Rita", "Misery", "Money (That's What I Want)", "No Reply", "Not a Second Time", "Rock and Roll Music", "Rocky Raccoon", "Slow Down", "What You're Doing", "You Like Me Too Much", "You Really Got a Hold on Me"; celesta to "Baby It's You"; Hammond organ to "Across the Universe", "Got to Get You into My Life", "Maxwell's Silver Hammer", and "With a Little Help from My Friends"; piano, harmonium, Lowrey organ and glockenspiel to "Being for the Benefit of Mr. Kite"; harmonium to "Cry Baby Cry", "A Day in the Life", and "The Word"; harpsichord to "Because" and "Fixing a Hole"; shaker to "Dig It"; and vocals to "Christmas Time (Is Here Again)" and "Yellow Submarine"
- David Mason—trumpeter; session musician. Contributed piccolo trumpet to "All You Need Is Love", "A Day in the Life" and "Penny Lane"
- David McCallum—violinist; session musician. Contributed violin to "A Day in the Life"
- John McCartney—Paul McCartney's cousin. Contributed hand claps to "Dear Prudence"
- Linda McCartney—Paul McCartney's then-wife. Contributed vocals to "Let It Be"
- Paul McCartney—aside from bass guitar and vocals on numerous recordings, McCartney also contributed acoustic and electric guitars, piano and electric piano, clavichord, organ, Mellotron, harmonium, percussion (such as hand claps, finger clicks, timpani, tambourine, claves, bongos, congas, cowbell, guiro, wind chimes, maracas and drums) flugelhorn, recorder and comb and paper; MacDonald also suggests McCartney may have provided trumpet and synthesizer
- Dennis McConnell—violinist; session musician. Contributed violin to "Martha My Dear"
- Mike McGear—photographer and brother of Paul McCartney. Contributed vocals to "All You Need Is Love"
- Andrew McGee—violinist; session musician. Contributed violin to "I Am the Walrus"
- Serena McKinney–violinist; session musician. Contributed violin to "Now and Then"
- John Meek—violist; session musician. Contributed viola to "A Day in the Life"
- Bernard Miller—violinist; session musician. Contributed violin to "Martha My Dear"
- Morris Miller—horn player; session musician. Contributed French horn to "I Am the Walrus"
- Mahapurush Misra—percussionist; session musician. Contributed tabla and pakhavaj to "The Inner Light"
- Bill Monro—violinist; session musician. Contributed violin to "A Day in the Life"
- Monty Montgomery—trumpeter; session musician. Contributed trumpet to "A Day in the Life"
- Keith Moon—drummer for The Who. Contributed vocals and brushed drums to "All You Need Is Love"
- T. Moore—trombonist; session musician. Contributed trombone to "A Day in the Life"
- Dick Morgan—oboist; session musician. Contributed oboe and cor anglais to "Penny Lane"
- Rex Morris—session musician. Contributed tenor saxophone to "All You Need Is Love"; saxophone to "Honey Pie"; and trombone to "Revolution 1"
- Danny Moss—saxophonist; session musician. Contributed tenor saxophone to "Savoy Truffle"
- Henry Myerscough—violist; session musician. Contributed viola to "Martha My Dear"

== N ==
- Graham Nash—singer-songwriter and then-member of The Hollies. Contributed vocals to "All You Need Is Love"
- Raymond Newman—clarinettist; session musician. Contributed clarinet to "Honey Pie"
- Alex Nifosi—cellist; session musician. Contributed cello to "A Day in the Life"

== O ==
- John O'Neill—vocalist; session musician and member of the Mike Sammes Singers. Contributed vocals to "I Am the Walrus"
- Yoko Ono—John Lennon's second wife. Contributed vocals to "Birthday", "The Continuing Story of Bungalow Bill" and "What's the New Mary Jane"

== P ==
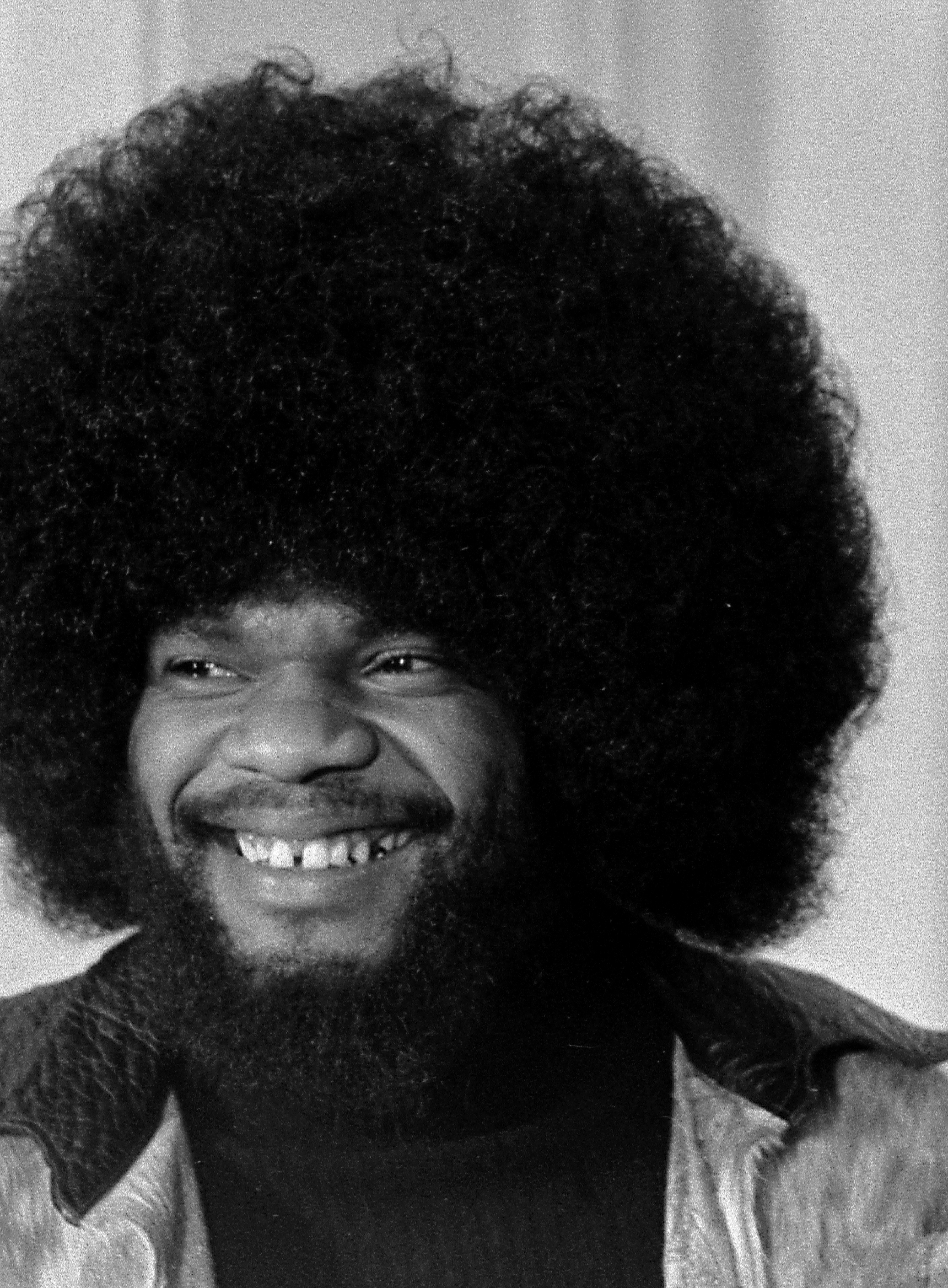
Billy Preston in 1974

- Gordon Pearce—bassist; session musician. Contributed double bass to "A Day in the Life" and "She's Leaving Home"
- Gayleen Pease—vocalist; Apple scruff. Contributed vocals to "Across the Universe"
- Adrianne Pope–violinist; session musician. Contributed violin to "Now and Then"
- Bill Povey—session musician. Contributed tenor saxophone to "Lady Madonna" and trombone to "Revolution 1"
- Linnea Powell–violist; session musician. Contributed viola to "Now and Then"
- J. Power—trombonist; session musician. Contributed trombone to "Revolution 1"
- Raymond Premru—trombonist; session musician. Contributed trombone to "A Day in the Life"
- Billy Preston—keyboardist; session musician regarded by some as the "Fifth Beatle". Contributed electric piano to "Dig a Pony", "Don't Let Me Down", "Get Back", "I've Got a Feeling", "The Long and Winding Road" and "One After 909"; and Hammond organ to "Blue Suede Shoes", "Dig It", "I Want You (She's So Heavy)", "Let It Be", "Rip It Up", "Something" and "Shake, Rattle and Roll"

== R ==
- Tony Randall—horn player; session musician. Contributed French horn to "Sgt. Pepper's Lonely Hearts Club Band"
- Mike Redway—vocalist; session musician and member of the Mike Sammes Singers. Contributed vocals to "Good Night" and "I Am the Walrus"
- Alf Reece—tuba player; session musician. Contributed tuba to "Martha My Dear"
- Frank Reidy—clarinettist; session musician. Contributed clarinet to "When I'm Sixty-Four"
- Stanley Reynolds—trumpeter; session musician. Contributed trumpet to "Martha My Dear"
- Jack Richards—violinist; session musician. Contributed violin to "I Am the Walrus"
- Keith Richards—guitarist and member of The Rolling Stones. Contributed vocals to "All You Need Is Love"
- Stanley Roderick—trumpeter; session musician. Contributed trumpet to "Strawberry Fields Forever"
- Lionel Ross—cellist; session musician. Contributed cello to "I Am the Walrus"
- Ronnie Ross—saxophonist; session musician. Contributed baritone saxophone to "Savoy Truffle".
- Jack Rothstein—violinist; session musician. Contributed violin to "I Am the Walrus" and "Within You Without You"

== S ==
- Neill Sanders—horn player; session musician. Contributed French horn to "A Day in the Life", "I Am the Walrus" and "Sgt. Pepper's Lonely Hearts Club Band"
- David Sandeman—flautist; session musician. Contributed flute to "A Day in the Life"
- Sidney Sax—violinist; session musician. Contributed violin to "All You Need Is Love", "A Day in the Life", "Eleanor Rigby", "Yesterday" and "I Am the Walrus"
- Paul Scherman—violinist; session musician. Contributed violin to "Within You Without You"
- Francie Schwartz—Paul McCartney's then-girlfriend. Contributed vocals to "Revolution 1"
- Ernest Scott—violinist; session musician. Contributed violin to "A Day in the Life"
- John Scott—flautist; session musician. "You've Got to Hide Your Love Away"
- Ronnie Scott—saxophonist; session musician. Contributed tenor saxophone to "Lady Madonna"
- Clifford Seville—flautist; session musician. Contributed flute to "A Day in the Life"
- John Sharpe—violinist; session musician. Contributed violin to "Eleanor Rigby"
- Stephen Shingles—violist; session musician. Contributed viola to "Eleanor Rigby" and "She's Leaving Home"
- Derek Simpson—cellist; session musician. Contributed cello to "Eleanor Rigby" and "Strawberry Fields Forever"
- David Smith—clarinettist; session musician. Contributed clarinet to "Honey Pie"
- J. Smith—vocalist; session musician and member of the Mike Sammes Singers. Contributed vocals to "I Am the Walrus"
- Lou Sofier—violinist; session musician. Contributed violin to "Martha My Dear"
- Harry Spain—trombonist; session musician. Contributed trombone to "All You Need Is Love"
- Victor Spinetti—actor. Contributed vocals to "Christmas Time (Is Here Again)"
- Maureen Starkey—Ringo Starr's then-wife. Contributed vocals to "The Continuing Story of Bungalow Bill"
- Ringo Starr—aside from drums and occasional vocals, Starr also contributed maracas, hand claps, bongos, congas, African drum, tambourine, shaker, sticks, cowbell, chimes, handbell, sleigh bells, finger cymbals, claves, chocalho, timpani piano, Hammond organ, harmonica, comb and paper and a suitcase; MacDonald suggests Starr may also have contributed bells
- Louis Stevens—violinist; session musician. Contributed violin to "I Am the Walrus"
- Val Stockwell—vocalist; session musician and member of the Mike Sammes Singers. Contributed vocals to "Good Night"
- Stuart Sutcliffe—bassist; original member. Contributed bass to "Cayenne", "Hallelujah, I Love Her So" and "You'll Be Mine" on Anthology 1
- Ray Swinfield—flautist; session musician. Contributed flute and piccolo to "Penny Lane"

== T ==
- Christopher Taylor—flautist; session musician. Contributed flute to "The Fool on the Hill"
- Richard Taylor—flautist; session musician. Contributed flute to "The Fool on the Hill"
- Chris Thomas—the group's co-producer on The Beatles. Contributed Mellotron to "The Continuing Story of Bungalow Bill", piano to "Long Long Long", harpsichord to "Piggies" and organ and electric piano to "Savoy Truffle"
- Ingrid Thomas—vocalist; session musician and member of the Mike Sammes Singers. Contributed vocals to "Good Night"
- Ronald Thomas—violinist; session musician. Contributed violin to "Glass Onion" and "Piggies"
- Eddie Thornton—trumpeter; session musician. Contributed trumpet to "Got to Get You into My Life"
- Basil Tschaikov—clarinettist; session musician. Contributed clarinet to "A Day in the Life"
- Tony Tunstall—horn player; session musician. Contributed French horn to "I Am the Walrus" and "Martha My Dear"

== U ==
- John Underwood—violist; session musician. Contributed viola to "A Day in the Life", "Eleanor Rigby", "Glass Onion", "Piggies" and "She's Leaving Home"
- Jill Utting—vocalist; session musician and member of the Mike Sammes Singers. Contributed vocals to "I Am the Walrus"

== V ==
- Mike Valerio–double bassist; session musician. Contributed double bass to "Now and Then"
- Dennis Vigay—cellist; session musician. Contributed cello to "A Day in the Life" and "She's Leaving Home"

== W ==
- Dennis Walton—session musician. Contributed saxophone to "Honey Pie" and flute and piccolo to "Penny Lane"
- Alfred Waters—bassoonist; session musician. Contributed bassoon to "A Day in the Life"
- Derek Watkins—trumpeter; session musician. Contributed trumpet to "Revolution 1" and "Strawberry Fields Forever"
- Evan Watkins—trombonist; session musician. Contributed trombone to "All You Need Is Love"
- Donald Weekes—violinist; session musician. Contributed violin to "A Day in the Life"
- Terry Weil—cellist; session musician. Contributed cello to "I Am the Walrus"
- Andy White—drummer; session musician. Contributed drums to "Love Me Do" and "P.S. I Love You"
- Pat Whitmore—vocalist; session musician and member of the Mike Sammes Singers. Contributed vocals to "Good Night" and "I Am the Walrus"
- John Wilbraham—trumpeter; session musician. Contributed trumpet to "Magical Mystery Tour"
- Trevor Williams—violinist; session musician. Contributed violin to "She's Leaving Home"
- Mike Winfield—oboist; session musician. Contributed oboe and cor anglais to "Penny Lane"
- Manny Winters—flautist; session musician. Contributed flute and piccolo to "Penny Lane"
- David Wolfsthal—violinist; session musician. Contributed violin to "Within You Without You"
- Stanley Woods—trumpeter; session musician. Contributed trumpet and flugelhorn to "All You Need Is Love"

== See also ==
- Outline of the Beatles
- The Beatles timeline

== Bibliography ==
- Bosso, Joe (10 September 2009), "Beatles engineer Geoff Emerick on Abbey Road", Music Radar, Bath, archived from the original on 17 July 2011
- BUFVC (2013), Tragedy of King Lear, The, London: British Universities Film and Video Council
- Chittenden, Maurice (20 March 2005), "McCartney wrote Sgt Pepper 'with a little help from his roadie friend'", The Times, London, archived from the original on 2 October 2013
- Everett, Walter (1999), The Beatles as Musicians: Revolver Through the Anthology, Oxford: Oxford University Press, ISBN 9780195129410
- Greenwald, Ted (1995), The Long and Winding Road: An Intimate Guide to The Beatles, New York: Friedman-Fairfax
- Huntley, Elliot J. (2004), Mystical One: George Harrison: After the Break-Up of The Beatles (1st ed.), Tonwanda: Guernica Editions, ISBN 1550711970
- Ingham, Chris (2003), The Rough Guide to The Beatles (1st ed.), London: Rough Guides, ISBN 1843531402
- Julien, Olivier (2008), Sgt. Pepper and The Beatles: It Was Forty Years Ago Today (1st ed.), Farnham, Surrey: Ashgate Publishing, ISBN 978-0754698548
- Lewisohn, Mark (1988), The Beatles' Recording Sessions (1st ed.), New York: Harmony Books, ISBN 0517570661
- Lewisohn, Mark (1995), Anthology 1 [album liner notes], London: Apple Records
- MacDonald, Ian (1998), Revolution in the Head: The Beatles' Records and the Sixties (1st ed.), London: Pimlico, ISBN 9780712666978
- MacDonald, Ian (2005), Revolution in the Head: The Beatles' Records and the Sixties (2nd ed.), London: Pimlico, ISBN 1844138283
- Matteo, Steve (2004), The Beatles' Let It Be, London: Continuum, ISBN 0826416349
- Miles, Barry (1998), Paul McCartney: Many Years from Now, London: Vintage, ISBN 9780749386580
- Miles, Barry (2009), The Beatles Diary Volume 1: The Beatles Years, London: Music Sales Group, ISBN 978-0857120007
- Norman, Philip (1981), Shout!: The Beatles in Their Generation, New York: Simon & Schuster, ISBN 0671432540
- Songwriter, 'Fifth Beatle' Billy Preston Dies, NPR, 2006
- Perone, James E (2012), The album : a guide to pop music's most provocative, influential, and important creations, Praeger, ISBN 9780313379062
- Prog Archives (2023), "THE BEATLES - Now And Then (2023)", Progarchives.com, Prog Archives
- Reid, Gordon (2002), "Rebirth of the Cool: Mellotron", Sound on Sound, Cambridge, archived from the original on 27 September 2013
- Spizer, Bruce (2007), The Beatles Swan Song: "She Loves You" & Other Records, New Orleans: 498 Productions, ISBN 978-0966264975
- The Beatles Bible (2008a), The Long and Winding Road, The Beatles Bible
- The Beatles Bible (2008b), What's the New Mary Jane, The Beatles Bible
- The Beatles Bible (2008c), 31 May 1968: Recording: Revolution 1, The Beatles Bible
- The Beatles Bible (2008d), Let It Be, The Beatles Bible
- The Beatles Online (2007a), Penny Lane, The Beatles Online
- The Beatles Online (2007b), Strawberry Fields Forever, The Beatles Online
- Vallance, Jim, "Purdie", jimvallance.com
- Winn, John C. (2008), Way Beyond Compare: The Beatles' Recorded Legacy, 1957–1965, New York: Three Rivers Press, ISBN 978-0307451576
- Womack, Kenneth (2006), Reading the Beatles: Cultural Studies, Literary Criticism, and the Fab Four, Cambridge: SUNY Press, ISBN 0791481964
- Womack, Kenneth (2007), Long and Winding Roads: The Evolving Artistry of The Beatles, New York: Cambridge University Press, ISBN 978-0521869652
- Womack, Kenneth (2009), The Cambridge Companion to The Beatles, Cambridge Companions to Music, Cambridge: Cambridge University Press, ISBN 978-0521869652
