= Anthony Gilbert =

Anthony or Tony Gilbert may refer to:

- Anthony Gilbert (composer) (1934–2023), British composer
- Anthony Gilbert (MP) (c. 1499–1555), English politician
- Anthony Gilbert (writer) (1899–1973), English crime writer
- Tony Gilbert (activist) (1914–1992), English political activist
- Tony Gilbert (Antonio Gilbert, born 1979), American football player
- Tony Gilbert (rugby union), New Zealand rugby coach
- Tony Gilbert, violinist noted for his work with The Beatles
