= The Beatles (album) =

1968 studio album by the Beatles

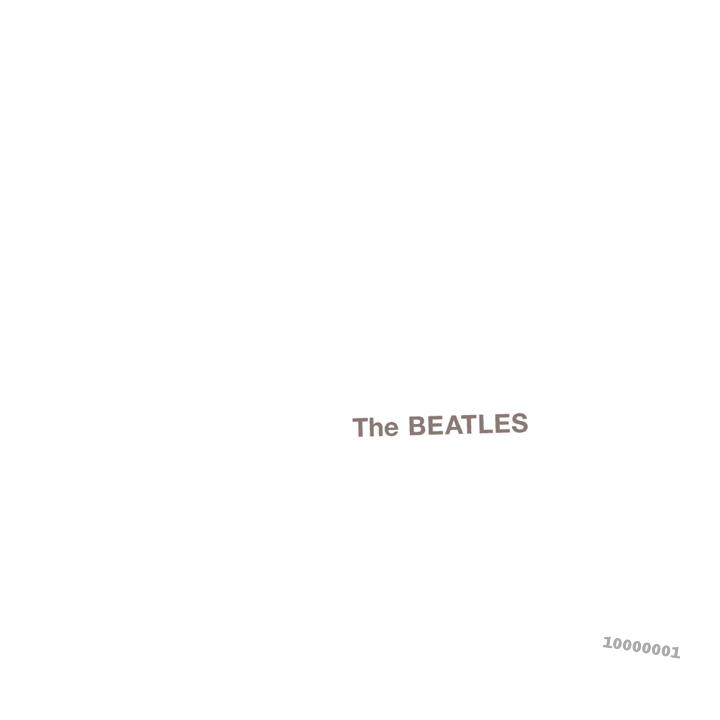
- Original copies had the band's name blind embossed on a white background and were numbered.

Studio album by the Beatles
- Released: 22 November 1968
- Recorded: 30 May – 14 October 1968
- Studios: EMI and Trident, London
- Genres: Rock; pop; folk
- Length: 93:33 (stereo version); 92:28 (mono version)
- Label: Apple
- Producers: George Martin; Chris Thomas (uncredited)

The Beatles chronology
Sgt. Pepper's Lonely Hearts Club Band (1967)	The Beatles (1968)	Yellow Submarine (1969)

The Beatles North American chronology
Magical Mystery Tour (1967)	The Beatles (1968)	Yellow Submarine (1969)

The Beatles (commonly referred to as The White Album) is the ninth studio album and only double album by the English rock band the Beatles, released on 22 November 1968. Featuring a plain white sleeve, the cover contains no graphics or text other than the band's name embossed. (Note: Early LP and CD releases include a unique serial number. Later reissues are not numbered.) This was intended as a direct contrast to the vivid cover artwork of the band's previous LP, Sgt. Pepper's Lonely Hearts Club Band (1967). The Beatles is recognised for its fragmentary style and diverse range of genres, including folk, country rock, British blues, ska, music hall, hard rock and avant-garde. Some critics have since viewed it as a postmodern work, and it is widely regarded as one of the greatest albums of all time. The album was the band's first LP release on their then-recently founded Apple Records.

In late May 1968, the Beatles returned to EMI Studios in London to commence recording sessions that lasted until mid-October. During these sessions, arguments frequently broke out among the foursome over creative differences and the presence of John Lennon's new partner, Yoko Ono, which countered the Beatles' policy of excluding wives and girlfriends from the studio. After a series of problems, including producer George Martin taking an unannounced holiday and engineer Geoff Emerick suddenly quitting during a session, Ringo Starr left the band for two weeks in August. The same tensions continued throughout the following year and led to the band's break-up.

The album features 30 songs, 19 of which were written during March and April 1968 at a Transcendental Meditation course in Rishikesh, India. There, the only Western instrument available to the band was the acoustic guitar; several of these songs remained acoustic on The Beatles and were recorded solo, or only by part of the group. The production aesthetic ensured that the album's sound was scaled down and less reliant on studio innovation than most of their releases since Revolver (1966). The Beatles also broke with the band's tradition at the time of incorporating several musical styles in one song by keeping each piece of music consistently faithful to a select genre.

The Beatles received favourable reviews from most music critics; detractors found its satirical songs unimportant and apolitical amid the turbulent political and social climate of 1968. It topped record charts in Britain and the United States. No singles were issued in either territory, but "Hey Jude" and "Revolution" originated from the same recording sessions and were issued as a single in August 1968. The album has since been certified 24× platinum by the Recording Industry Association of America (RIAA), tied for fifth all time. A remixed and expanded edition of the album was released in 2018.

== Background ==
By 1968, the Beatles had achieved unprecedented levels of commercial and critical success. The group's mid-1967 release, Sgt. Pepper's Lonely Hearts Club Band, was number one in the UK for 27 weeks, until the start of February 1968, having sold 250,000 copies in the first week after release. Time magazine declared that Sgt. Pepper constituted a "historic departure in the progress of music – any music", while the American writer Timothy Leary wrote that the band were "the wisest, holiest, most effective avatars (Divine Incarnate, God Agents) that the human race has ever produced". The band received a negative critical response to their television film Magical Mystery Tour, which aired in Britain in December 1967, but fan reaction was nevertheless positive.

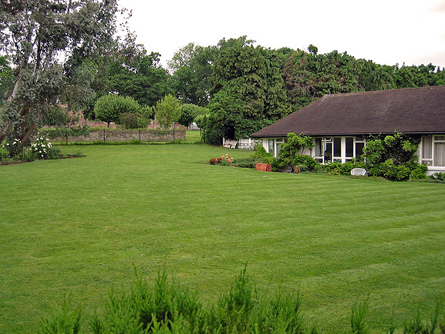
The songs that appear on The Beatles were demoed at George Harrison's home, Kinfauns, in May 1968.

Most of the songs for The Beatles were written during a Transcendental Meditation course with Maharishi Mahesh Yogi in Rishikesh, India, between February and April 1968. The retreat involved long periods of meditation, conceived by the band as a spiritual respite from all worldly endeavours – a chance, in John Lennon's words, to "get away from everything". Lennon and Paul McCartney quickly re-engaged themselves in songwriting, often meeting "clandestinely in the afternoons in each other's rooms" to review their new work. "Regardless of what I was supposed to be doing," Lennon later recalled, "I did write some of my best songs there." Author Ian MacDonald said Sgt. Pepper was "shaped by LSD", but the Beatles took no drugs with them to India aside from marijuana, and their clear minds helped the group with their songwriting. The stay in Rishikesh proved especially fruitful for George Harrison as a songwriter, coinciding with his re-engagement with the guitar after two years studying the sitar. The musicologist Walter Everett likens Harrison's development as a composer in 1968 to that of Lennon and McCartney five years before, although he notes that Harrison became "privately prolific", given his usual subordinate status within the group.

The Beatles left Rishikesh before the end of the course. Ringo Starr was the first to leave, less than two weeks later, as he said he could not tolerate the food; McCartney departed in mid-March, while Harrison and Lennon were more interested in Indian religion and remained until April. Lennon left Rishikesh because he felt personally betrayed after hearing rumours that the Maharishi had behaved inappropriately towards women who accompanied the Beatles to India. McCartney and Harrison later discovered the accusations to be untrue and Lennon's wife Cynthia reported there was "not a shred of evidence or justification". (Note: Harrison later repaired his friendship with the Maharishi in the Natural Law Party.)

Collectively, the group wrote around 40 new songs in Rishikesh, 26 of which would be recorded in rough form at Kinfauns, Harrison's home in Esher, in May 1968. Lennon wrote the bulk of the new material, contributing 14 songs. Lennon and McCartney brought home-recorded demos to the session, and worked on them together. Some home demos and group sessions at Kinfauns were later released on the 1996 compilation Anthology 3. The whole set of Esher demos was released in the remixed 50th anniversary deluxe edition in 2018.

== Style and production ==
=== Sessions ===
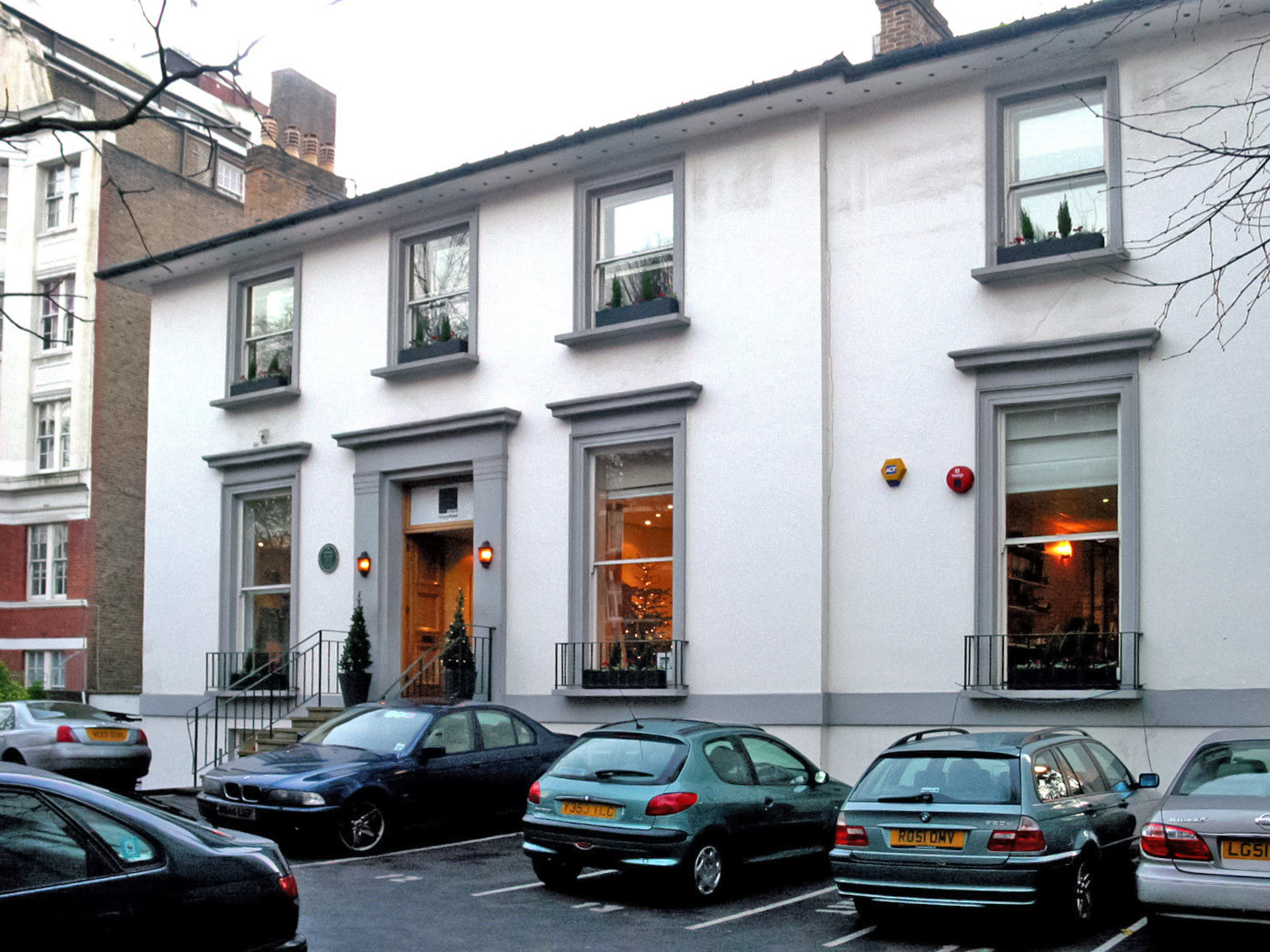
The album was recorded largely at Abbey Road Studios.

The Beatles was recorded between 30 May and 14 October 1968, largely at Abbey Road Studios in London, with some sessions at Trident Studios. Their time in Rishikesh was soon forgotten in the tense atmosphere of the studio, with sessions occurring at irregular hours. The group's self-belief led to the formation of a new multimedia business corporation, Apple Corps, an enterprise that drained the group financially with a series of unsuccessful projects.

The group block-booked time at Abbey Road through July. The open-ended studio time led to a new way of working out songs. Instead of tightly rehearsing a backing track, as in previous sessions, the group recorded all the rehearsals and jamming, then added overdubs to the best take. The production aesthetic ensured that the album's sound was scaled down and less reliant on studio innovation than Revolver and Sgt. Pepper. Harrison's song "Not Guilty" was left off the album, though 102 takes were recorded.

Only 16 of the album's 30 tracks feature all four band members performing. (Note: "Revolution 1", "Everybody's Got Something To Hide Except Me and My Monkey", "Ob-La-Di, Ob-La-Da", "Cry Baby Cry", "Helter Skelter", "Sexy Sadie", "While My Guitar Gently Weeps", "Yer Blues", "Rocky Raccoon", "Glass Onion", "Birthday", "Happiness Is A Warm Gun", "Piggies", "Honey Pie", "I'm So Tired", "The Continuing Story of Bungalow Bill") Several backing tracks do not feature the full group, and overdubs tended to be performed by the songwriter. McCartney and Lennon sometimes recorded simultaneously in different studios with different engineers. George Martin's influence had gradually waned, and he left abruptly to go on a holiday during the recording sessions, leaving his young protégé Chris Thomas in charge of production.

During the sessions, the band upgraded from 4-track recording to 8-track. As work began, Abbey Road Studios possessed, but had yet to install, an 8-track machine that had supposedly been sitting unused for several months. This was in accordance with EMI's policy of testing and customising new gear extensively before putting it into use. The Beatles recorded "Hey Jude" and "Dear Prudence" at Trident because it had an 8-track console. When they learned that EMI also had one, they insisted on using it, and engineers Ken Scott and Dave Harries installed the machine (without studio management authorisation) in Abbey Road's Studio 2.

The band held their first and only 24-hour session at Abbey Road during the final mixing and sequencing for the album. This session was attended by Lennon, McCartney and Martin; Harrison had left on a trip to the US the day before. Unlike most LPs, there was no customary three-second gap between tracks, and the master was edited so that songs segued together, via a straight edit, a crossfade, or an incidental piece of music.

=== Genres and length ===
The Beatles contains a wide range of musical styles, which authors Barry Miles and Gillian Gaar view as the most diverse of any of the group's albums. These styles include rock and roll, blues, folk, country, reggae, avant-garde, hard rock, and music hall. The only Western instrument available to the group during their Indian visit was the acoustic guitar, and thus many of the songs were written and first performed on that instrument. Some of these songs remained acoustic on The Beatles and were recorded solo or by only part of the group (including "Wild Honey Pie", "Blackbird", "Julia", "I Will" and "Mother Nature's Son").

Author Nicholas Schaffner views the acoustic slant as reflective of a widespread departure from the LSD-inspired psychedelia of 1967, an approach initiated by Bob Dylan and the Beach Boys and adopted in 1968 by artists such as the Rolling Stones and the Byrds. Edwin Faust of Stylus Magazine described The Beatles as "foremost an album about musical purity (as the album cover and title suggest). Whereas on prior Beatles albums, the band was getting into the habit of mixing several musical genres into a single song, on the White Album every song is faithful to its selected genre. The rock n' roll tracks are purely rock n' roll; the folk songs are purely folk; the surreal pop numbers are purely surreal pop; and the experimental piece is purely experimental."

Martin said he was against the idea of a double album at the time and suggested that the group reduce the number of songs to form a single album featuring their stronger work; the band refused. Reflecting on the album years later, Harrison said that some tracks could have been released as B-sides or withheld, but "there was a lot of ego in that band." He also supported the idea of the double album, to clear out the group's backlog of songs. Starr felt that the album should have been two separate records, which he jokingly called "The White Album" and "The Whiter Album". McCartney said that the record was fine as it was: "It was great. It sold. It's the bloody Beatles' White Album. Shut up!"

=== Personal problems ===
During the recording sessions for The Beatles, each member of the band began to increasingly assert themselves as individual artists who frequently found themselves at odds. McCartney described the sessions as a turning point for the group because "there was a lot of friction during that album. We were just about to break up, and that was tense in itself"; Lennon said, "the break-up of the Beatles can be heard on that album". Recording engineer Geoff Emerick had worked with the group since Revolver, but became disillusioned with the sessions. He overheard Martin criticising McCartney's vocal performance while recording "Ob-La-Di, Ob-La-Da", to which McCartney replied, "Well you come down and sing it". On 16 July, Emerick announced that because of the frequent bickering and tension, he was no longer willing to work with the Beatles and left the studio in the midst of a session.

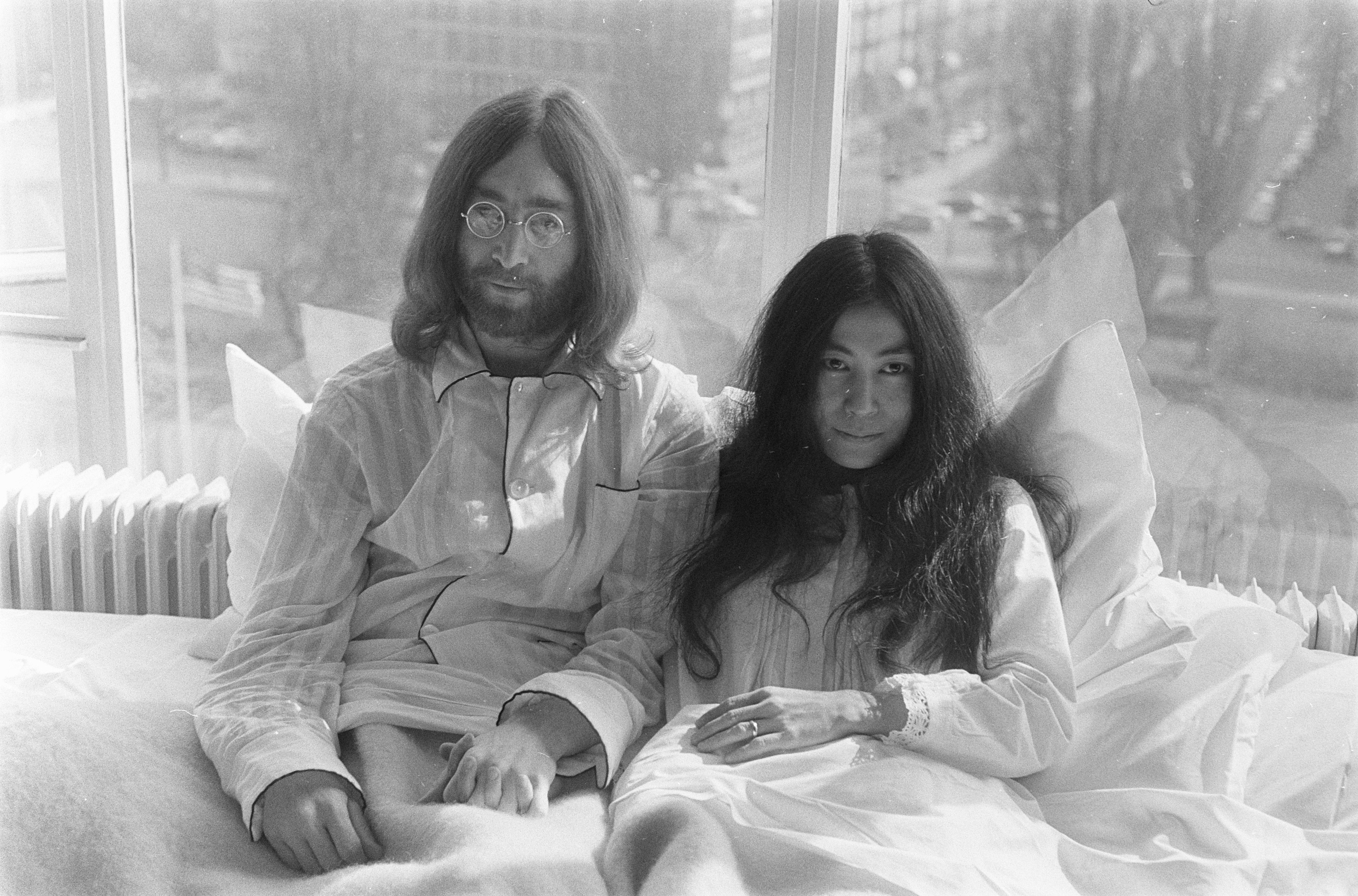
The new relationship between John Lennon and Yoko Ono caused tension in the studio with the other Beatles.

The Beatles sessions marked the first appearance in the studio of Lennon's new domestic and artistic partner, Yoko Ono, who accompanied him to Abbey Road to work on "Revolution 1" and who was thereafter a more or less constant presence at Beatles recording sessions. Ono's presence was highly unorthodox as, up to that point, the Beatles had generally worked in isolation, rarely allowing visitors, wives and girlfriends to attend recording sessions. Lennon's devotion to Ono over the other Beatles made working conditions difficult by impeding communication between Lennon and McCartney, as well as the intuitive aspect that had previously been essential to the band's music. McCartney's girlfriend at the time, Francie Schwartz, was also present at some sessions, as were the other two Beatles' wives, Pattie Harrison and Maureen Starkey.

Peter Doggett writes that "the most essential line of communication" had been broken between Lennon and McCartney by Ono's presence on the first day of recording. Beatles biographer Philip Norman comments that the two shared a disregard for the other's new songs; Lennon found McCartney's songs "cloyingly sweet and bland", while McCartney viewed Lennon's as "harsh, unmelodious and deliberately provocative". Harrison and Starr chose to distance themselves partway through the project, flying to California on 7 June so that Harrison could film his scenes for the Ravi Shankar documentary Raga. Lennon's, McCartney's and Harrison's individual projects outside the band in 1968 were further evidence of the group's fragmentation. In Lennon's case, the album cover of his experimental collaboration with Ono, Two Virgins, featured the couple completely naked, a gesture his bandmates found bewildering and unnecessary.

On 20 August, Lennon and Starr were working on overdubs for "Yer Blues" in Studio 3, and visited McCartney in Studio 2 where he was working on "Mother Nature's Son". The positive spirit of the session disappeared immediately, and engineer Ken Scott later claimed that "you could cut the atmosphere with a knife". Starr abruptly left the studio on 22 August during the session for "Back in the U.S.S.R.", feeling that his role in the group was peripheral compared to the other members, and upset at McCartney's constant criticism of his drumming on the track. Abbey Road staff later commented that Starr was usually the first to arrive at the studio, waiting in the reception area for the others to arrive. In his absence, McCartney played the drums on "Dear Prudence". For "Back in the U.S.S.R.", the three remaining Beatles each made contributions on bass and drums, and the drum part is a composite of Lennon, McCartney, and Harrison's playing. Lennon, McCartney, and Harrison pleaded with Starr to reconsider. He returned on 5 September to find his drum kit decorated with flowers, a welcome-back gesture from Harrison.

=== Mono version ===
The Beatles was the last Beatles album to be mixed separately for stereo and mono. All but two tracks exist in official mono mixes; the exceptions are "Revolution 1" and "Revolution 9", both direct reductions of the stereo master. The Beatles had not been particularly interested in stereo until this album, but after receiving mail from fans stating they bought both stereo and mono mixes of earlier albums, they decided to make the two different. Several mixes have different track lengths; the mono mix/edit of "Helter Skelter" eliminates the fade-in at the end of the song (and Starr's ending scream), and the fade-out of "Yer Blues" is 11 seconds longer on the mono mix. Several songs have missing or different overdubs or effects which differ from the stereo mixes.

In the United States, mono records were already being phased out; the US release of The Beatles was the first Beatles LP to be issued in stereo only. In the UK, the Beatles' following album, Yellow Submarine, was the last to be issued in mono. The mono version of The Beatles was made available worldwide on 9 September 2009, as part of The Beatles in Mono CD boxed set. The original mono LP was rereleased worldwide in September 2014.

== Songs ==
=== Side one ===
McCartney wrote "Back in the U.S.S.R." as a parody of Chuck Berry's song "Back in the U.S.A." and the Beach Boys. A field recording of a jet aeroplane taking off and landing was used at the start of the track, and intermittently throughout it. The backing vocals were sung by Lennon and Harrison in the style of the Beach Boys, further to Mike Love's suggestion in Rishikesh that McCartney include mention of the "girls" in the USSR. The track became widely bootlegged in the Soviet Union, where the Beatles' music was banned, and became an underground hit. (Note: In 1987, McCartney recorded a covers album titled Снова в СССР – Russian for "Back in the U.S.S.R.")

"Dear Prudence" was one of the songs recorded at Trident. The style is typical of the acoustic songs written in Rishikesh, using guitar arpeggios. Lennon wrote the track about Mia Farrow's sister Prudence Farrow, who rarely left her room during the stay in commitment to the meditation.

"Glass Onion" was the first backing track recorded as a full band after Starr's brief departure. MacDonald claimed Lennon deliberately wrote the lyrics to mock fans who claimed to find "hidden messages" in songs, and referenced other songs in the Beatles catalogue – "The Walrus was Paul" refers back to "I Am the Walrus" (which itself refers to "Lucy in the Sky with Diamonds"). McCartney, in turn, overdubbed a recorder part after the line "I told you about the Fool on the Hill", as a deliberate reference to the earlier song. A string section was added to the track in October.

Lennon went straight to the piano and smashed the keys with an almighty amount of volume, twice the speed of how they'd done it before, and said "This is it! Come on!"

— Recording engineer Richard Lush on the final take of "Ob-La-Di, Ob-La-Da"

"Ob-La-Di, Ob-La-Da" was written by McCartney as a pastiche of ska music. The track took a surprising amount of time to complete, with McCartney demanding perfectionism that annoyed his colleagues. Jimmy Scott, a friend of McCartney, suggested the title and played bongos on the initial take. He demanded a cut of publishing when the song was released, but the song was credited to "Lennon–McCartney". After working for three days on the backing track, the work was scrapped and replaced with a new recording. Lennon hated the song, calling it "granny music shit", while engineer Richard Lush recalled that Starr disliked having to record the same backing track repetitively, and pinpoints this session as a key indication that the Beatles were going to break up. McCartney attempted to remake the backing track for a third time, but this was abandoned after a few takes and the second version was used as the final mix. The group, save for McCartney, had lost interest in the track by the end of recording, and refused to release it as a single. Marmalade recorded a version that became a number one hit.

McCartney recorded "Wild Honey Pie" on 20 August at the end of the session for "Mother Nature's Son". It is typical of the brief snippets of songs he recorded between takes during the album sessions.

"The Continuing Story of Bungalow Bill" was written by Lennon after an American visitor to Rishikesh left for a few weeks to hunt tigers. It was recorded as an audio vérité exercise, featuring vocal performances from almost everyone who happened to be in the studio at the time. Ono sings one line and co-sings another, while Chris Thomas played the Mellotron, including improvisations at the end of the track. The opening flamenco guitar flourish was a recording included in the Mellotron's standard tape library.

"While My Guitar Gently Weeps" was written by Harrison during a visit he made to his parents' home in Cheshire. He first recorded the song as a solo performance, on acoustic guitar, on 25 July – a version that remained unreleased until Anthology 3. He was unhappy with the group's first attempt to record the track, and so invited his friend Eric Clapton to come and play on it. Clapton was unsure about guesting on a Beatles record, but Harrison said the decision was "nothing to do with them. It's my song." Clapton's solo was treated with automatic double tracking to attain the desired effect; he gave Harrison the guitar he used, which Harrison later named "Lucy". (Note: Harrison soon reciprocated by collaborating with Clapton on the song "Badge" for Cream's final studio album, Goodbye. Harrison, too, was not formally credited at first, but was identified as "L'Angelo Misterioso" on the cover.)

"Happiness Is a Warm Gun" evolved out of several song fragments that Lennon compiled into one piece, having previewed two of the segments in his May 1968 demo. According to MacDonald, this approach was possibly inspired by the Incredible String Band's songwriting. The basic backing track ran to 95 takes, due to the irregular time signatures and variations in style throughout the song. The final version consisted of the best halves of two takes edited together. Lennon later described the song as one of his favourites, while the rest of the band found the recording rejuvenating, as it forced them to re-hone their skills as a group playing together to get it right. Apple's press officer Derek Taylor made an uncredited contribution to the song's lyrics.

=== Side two ===
McCartney took the title of "Martha My Dear" from his Old English Sheepdog, but the lyrics are otherwise unrelated. The entire track is played by him backed with session musicians, and features no other Beatles. Martin composed a brass band arrangement for the track.

"I'm So Tired" was written in India when Lennon was having difficulty sleeping. It was recorded at the same session as "The Continuing Story of Bungalow Bill". The lyrics make reference to Walter Raleigh, calling him a "stupid git" for introducing tobacco to Europe; while the track ends with Lennon mumbling "Monsieur, monsieur, how about another one?" This became part of the Paul is Dead conspiracy theory, when fans claimed that when the track was reversed, they could hear "Paul is dead man, miss him, miss him, miss him".

"Blackbird" features McCartney solo, accompanying himself on acoustic guitar. According to Lewisohn, the ticking in the background is a metronome, but Emerick recalls capturing the sound via a microphone placed beside McCartney's shoes. The birdsong on the track was taken from the Abbey Road sound effects collection, and was recorded on one of the first EMI portable tape recorders.

Harrison wrote "Piggies" as an attack on greed and materialism in modern society. His mother and Lennon helped him complete the lyrics. Thomas played harpsichord on the track, while Lennon supplied a tape loop of pigs grunting.

"Rocky Raccoon" evolved from a jam session with McCartney, Lennon and Donovan in Rishikesh. The song was taped in a single session, and was one of the tracks that Martin felt was "filler" and put on only because the album was a double.

"Don't Pass Me By" was Starr's first solo composition for the band; he had been toying with the idea of writing a self-reflective song for some time, possibly as far back as 1963. It went by the working titles of "Ringo's Tune" and "This Is Some Friendly". The basic track consisted of Starr drumming while McCartney played piano. Martin composed an orchestral introduction to the song but it was rejected as "too bizarre" and left off the album. Instead, Jack Fallon played a bluegrass fiddle part.

McCartney wrote "Why Don't We Do It in the Road?" in India after he saw two monkeys copulating in the street and wondered why humans were too civilised to do the same. He played all the instruments except drums, which were contributed by Starr. The simple lyric was much in Lennon's style, and Lennon was annoyed not to be asked to play on it. McCartney suggested it was "tit for tat" as he had not contributed to "Revolution 9".

McCartney wrote and sang "I Will", with Lennon and Starr accompanying on percussion. In between numerous takes, the three Beatles broke off to busk some other songs. A snippet of a track known as "Can You Take Me Back?" was put between "Cry Baby Cry" and "Revolution 9", while recordings of Cilla Black's hit "Step Inside Love" and a joke number, "Los Paranoias", were released on Anthology 3.

"Julia" was the last track to be recorded for the album and features Lennon on solo acoustic guitar, which he played in a style similar to McCartney's on "Blackbird". This is the only Beatles song on which Lennon performs alone. It is a tribute to his mother, Julia Lennon, who was killed in 1958 in a road accident when Lennon was 17, and the lyrics deal with the loss of his mother and his relationship with Ono, the "ocean child" in the lyrics. Ono helped with the lyrics, but the song was still credited to Lennon–McCartney as expected.

=== Side three ===
According to McCartney, the authorship of "Birthday" was "50–50 John and me, made up on the spot and recorded all on the same evening". He and Lennon were inspired to write the song after seeing the first UK showing of the rock 'n' roll film The Girl Can't Help It on television, and sang the lead vocal in the style of the film's musical star, Little Richard. After the Beatles taped the track, Ono and Pattie Harrison added backing vocals.

Lennon wrote "Yer Blues" in India. Despite meditating and the tranquil atmosphere, he still felt unhappy, as reflected in the lyrics. The style was influenced by the British Blues Boom of 1968, which included Fleetwood Mac, Cream, the Jimi Hendrix Experience, Jeff Beck and Chicken Shack. The backing track was recorded in a small room next to the Studio 2 control room. Unusual for a Beatles recording, the four-track source tape was edited directly, resulting in an abrupt cut-off at 3'17" into the start of another take (which ran into the fadeout). (Note: "Yer Blues" was one of the few late-period Beatles songs that Lennon performed live. Backed by Clapton, Keith Richards and Mitch Mitchell, he first played it on 11 December 1968 at The Rolling Stones Rock and Roll Circus; a version recorded with the Plastic Ono Band in September 1969 appears on the live album Live Peace in Toronto.)

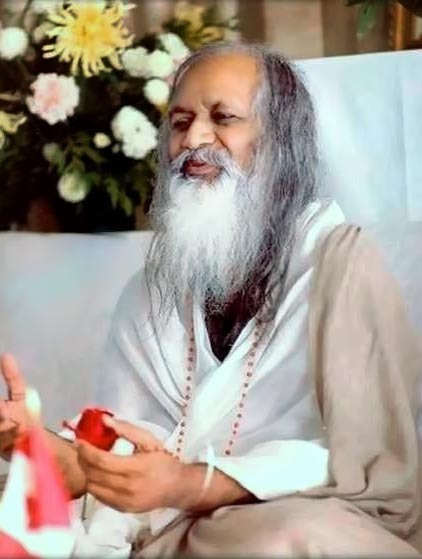
"Everybody's Got Something to Hide Except Me and My Monkey" and "Sexy Sadie" were both written in reference to Maharishi Mahesh Yogi.

McCartney wrote "Mother Nature's Son" in India, and worked on it in isolation from the other members of the band. He performed the track solo alongside a Martin-scored brass arrangement.

"Everybody's Got Something to Hide Except Me and My Monkey" evolved from a jam session and was originally untitled. The final mix was sped up by mixing the tape running at 43 hertz instead of the usual 50. Harrison claimed the title came from one of the Maharishi's sayings (with "and my monkey" added later).

"Sexy Sadie" was written as "Maharishi" by Lennon shortly after he decided to leave Rishikesh. In a 1980 interview, Lennon acknowledged that the Maharishi was the inspiration for the song: "I just called him 'Sexy Sadie'."

"Helter Skelter" was written by McCartney and was initially recorded in July as a blues number. The band performed the initial takes live and included long passages during which they jammed on their instruments. Because these takes were too long to practically fit on an LP, the song was shelved until September, when a new, shorter version was made. By all accounts, the session was chaotic, but nobody dared suggest to any of the Beatles that they were out of control. Harrison reportedly ran around the studio holding a flaming ashtray above his head, "doing an Arthur Brown". The stereo version of the LP includes almost a minute more music than the mono, which culminates in Starr famously shouting "I've got blisters on my fingers!" Cult leader and mass murderer Charles Manson was unaware that the term helter skelter is British English for a spiral slide found on a playground or funfair, and assumed the track had something to do with hell. This was one of the tracks that led Manson to believe the album had coded messages referring to apocalyptic war, and led to his movement of the same name.

The final song on side three is Harrison's "Long, Long, Long", part of a chord progression he took from Bob Dylan's "Sad Eyed Lady of the Lowlands". MacDonald describes the song as Harrison's "touching token of exhausted, relieved reconciliation with God" and considered it to be his "finest moment on The Beatles". The recording session for the basic track was one of the longest the Beatles ever undertook, running from the afternoon of 7 October through the night until 7 am the next day. McCartney played Hammond organ on the track, and an "eerie rattling" effect at the end was created by a note causing a wine bottle on top of the organ's Leslie speaker to resonate.

=== Side four ===
"Revolution 1" was the first track recorded for the album, with sessions for the backing track starting on 30 May. The initial takes were recorded as a possible single, but as the session progressed, the arrangement became slower, with more of a laid-back groove. The group ended the chosen take with a six-minute improvisation that had further overdubs added, before being cut to the length heard on the album. The brass arrangement was added later.

McCartney wrote "Honey Pie" as a pastiche of the 1920s' flapper dance style. The opening section had the sound of an old 78 RPM record overdubbed while Martin arranged a saxophone and clarinet part in the same style. Lennon played the guitar solo on the track, but later said he hated the song, calling it "beyond redemption".

"Savoy Truffle" was named after one of the types of chocolate found in a box of Mackintosh's Good News, which Clapton enjoyed eating. The track featured a saxophone sextet arranged by Thomas, who also played keyboards. Harrison later said that Derek Taylor helped him finish the lyrics.

Lennon began writing "Cry Baby Cry" in late 1967 and the lyrics were partly derived from the tagline of an old television commercial. Martin played harmonium on the track.

"Revolution 9" evolved from the overdubs from the "Revolution 1" coda. Lennon, Harrison and Ono added further tape collages and spoken word extracts, in the style of Karlheinz Stockhausen. The track opens with an extract of a piano theme from a Royal Schools of Music examination tape, and climaxes with Ono saying "if you become naked". Ono was heavily involved in the production, and advised Lennon on what tape loops to use. McCartney was out of the country at the time and did not contribute to the track, and was reportedly unhappy that it was included. He had led similar tape experiments such as "Carnival of Light" in January 1967. The track has attracted both interest and disapproval from fans and critics over the years.

Lennon wrote "Good Night" as a lullaby for his son Julian, and wanted Starr to sing it. The early takes featured just Lennon on acoustic guitar and Starr singing. Martin scored an orchestral and choral arrangement that replaced the guitar in the final mix, and also played the celesta.

=== Singles ===
"Hey Jude" was recorded at the end of July 1968 during the sessions for The Beatles but was issued separately as a single nearly three months before the album's release. This was the first release on Apple Records and ultimately the band's most successful single in the US. The B-side, "Revolution", was a different version of the album's "Revolution 1". Lennon wanted the original version of "Revolution" to be released as a single, but the other three Beatles objected that it was too slow. Instead, a new, faster version, with heavily distorted guitar and an electric piano solo by Nicky Hopkins was featured on the "Hey Jude" single.

The convention in the British music industry at the time was that singles and albums were distinct entities and should not duplicate songs. (Note: In February 1967, the Beatles had been unhappy about having to accede to Capitol Records' demand for a new single, because the two tracks, "Strawberry Fields Forever" and "Penny Lane", were therefore ineligible for inclusion on Sgt. Pepper.) But although no singles were taken from The Beatles in Britain or America, "Ob-La-Di, Ob-La-Da" backed with "While My Guitar Gently Weeps" was released in other markets. The single was a commercial success in Australia (where it spent five weeks at number one on the Go-Set chart), Japan, Austria and Switzerland.

=== Unreleased material ===
Some songs the Beatles were working on individually during this period were revisited for inclusion on their subsequent albums, while others were released on the band members' solo albums. According to the bootlegged album of the demos made at Kinfauns, the latter of these two categories includes Lennon's "Look at Me" and "Child of Nature" (eventually reworked as "Jealous Guy"); McCartney's "Junk"; and Harrison's "Not Guilty" and "Circles". In addition, Harrison gave "Sour Milk Sea" to the singer Jackie Lomax, whose recording, produced by Harrison, was released in August 1968 as Lomax's debut single on Apple Records. Lennon's "Mean Mr. Mustard" and "Polythene Pam" were used in the medley on Abbey Road the following year.

The Lennon composition "What's the New Mary Jane" was demoed at Kinfauns and recorded formally (by Lennon, Harrison and Ono) during the 1968 album sessions. McCartney taped demos of two compositions at Abbey Road – "Etcetera" and "The Long and Winding Road" – the latter of which the Beatles recorded in 1969 on Let It Be. The Beatles versions of "Not Guilty" and "What's the New Mary Jane" and a demo of "Junk" were released on Anthology 3.

"Revolution (Take 20)", a previously uncirculated recording, surfaced in 2009 on a bootleg. This ten-minute take was later edited and overdubbed to create two separate tracks: "Revolution 1" and the avant-garde "Revolution 9".

== Release ==
=== Packaging ===
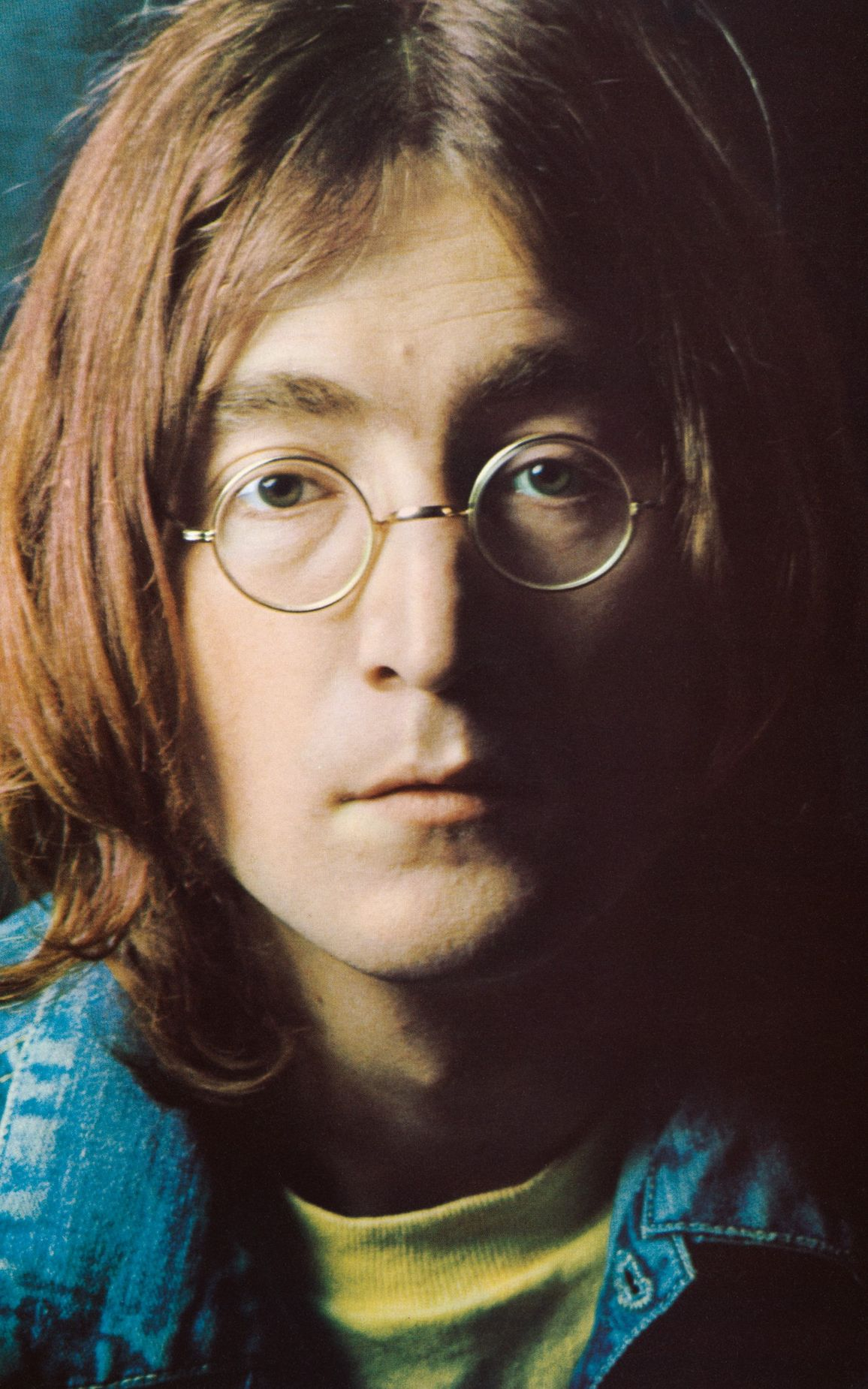
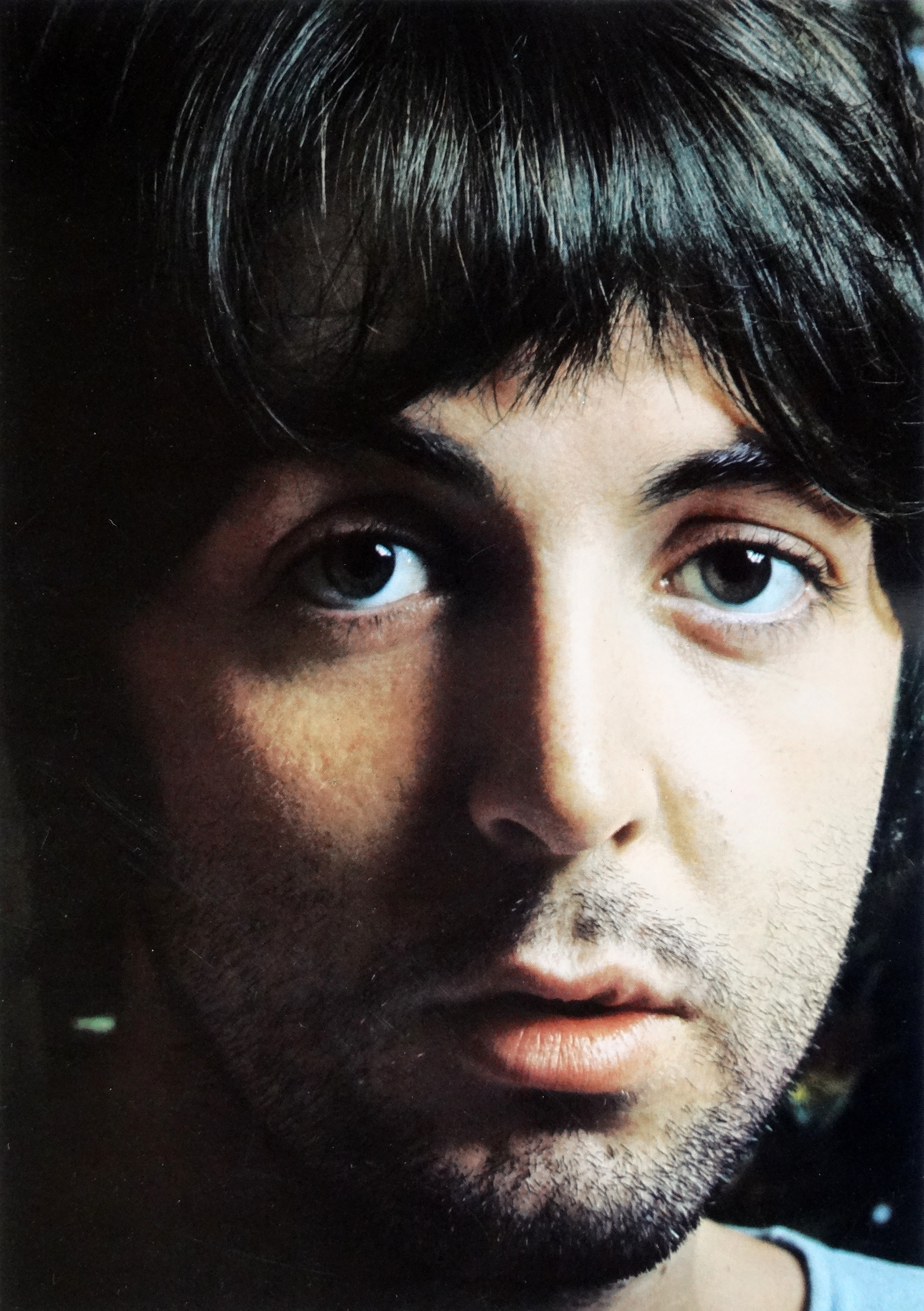
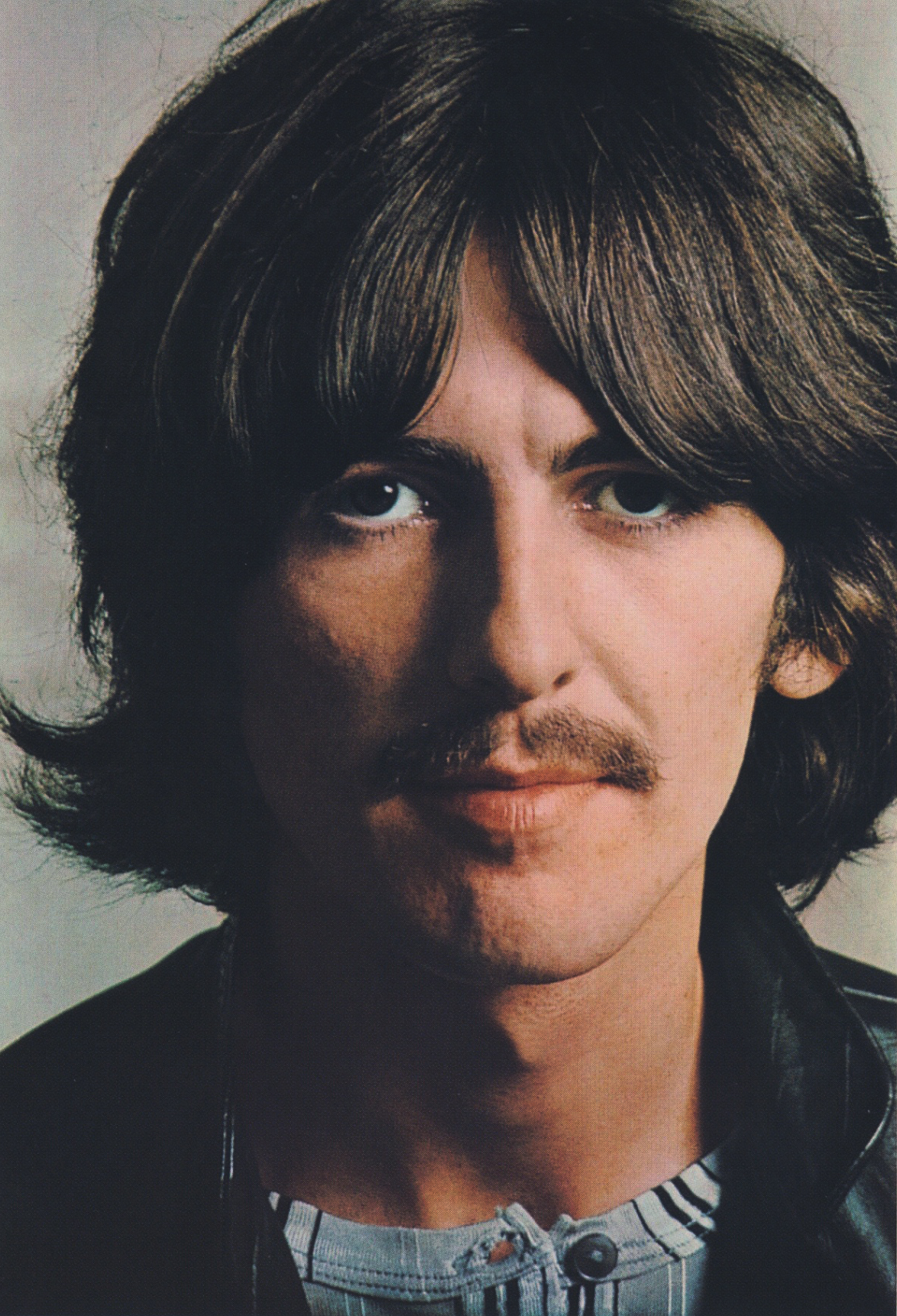
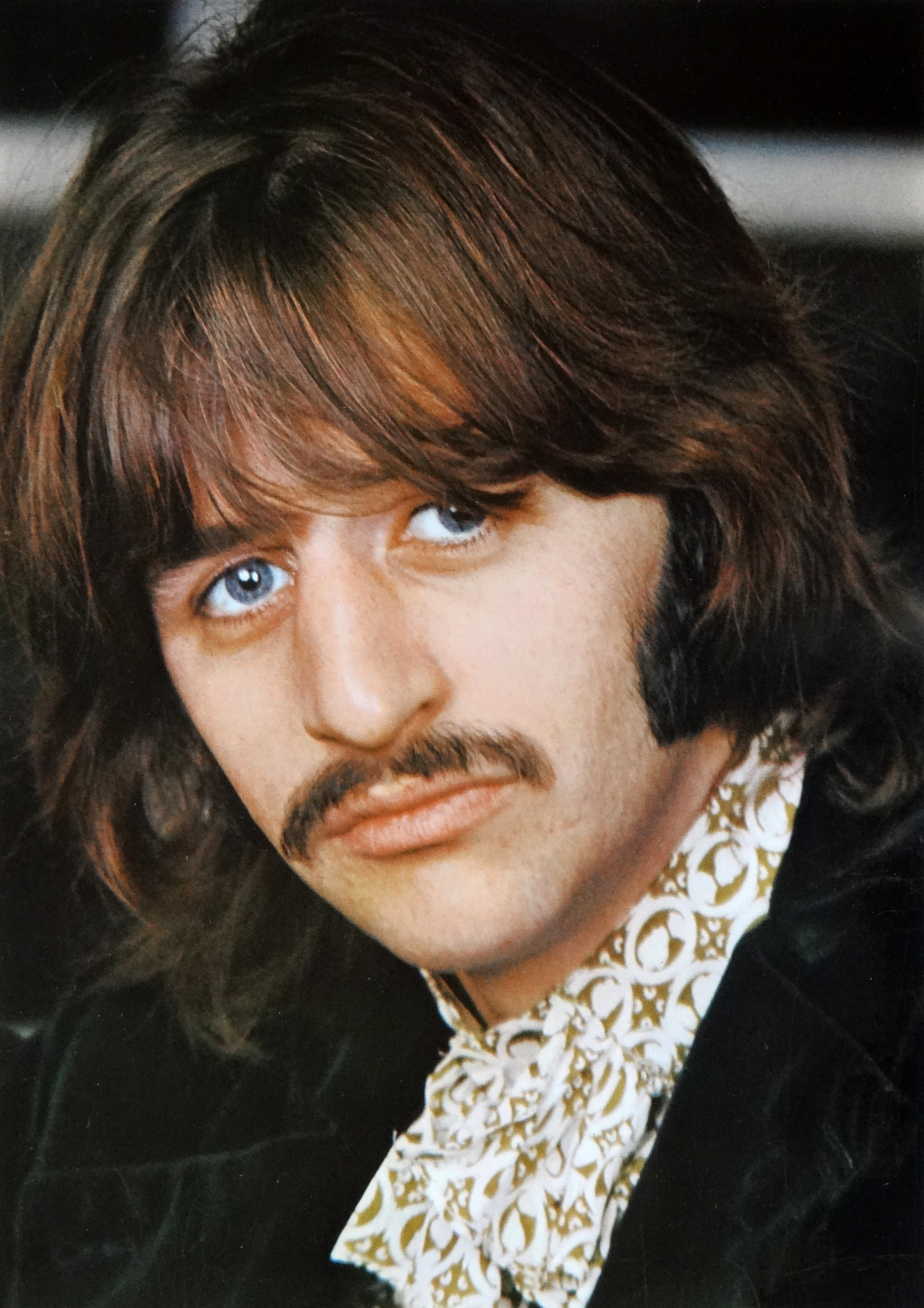
The portraits included in the album's packaging, taken in the autumn of 1968 by John Kelly. From left: John Lennon, Paul McCartney, George Harrison, Ringo Starr.

The Beatles was issued on 22 November 1968 in Britain and three days later in the US. It was the third album to be released by Apple Records, following Harrison's Wonderwall Music and Lennon and Ono's Two Virgins. The record was referred to as "the White Album" immediately upon release.

Conceptual artist Richard Hamilton designed the record sleeve in collaboration with McCartney. Hamilton's design was in stark contrast to Pop artists Peter Blake's and Jann Haworth's elaborate and vivid cover art for Sgt. Pepper's Lonely Hearts Club Band, and consisted of a plain white sleeve. The band's name, in Helvetica, was crookedly blind embossed slightly below the middle of the album's right side. Later vinyl record releases in the US showed the title in grey printed (rather than embossed) letters. Each copy of the record featured a unique stamped serial number, "to create", in Hamilton's words, "the ironic situation of a numbered edition of something like five million copies". The first four numbered copies were given to the members of the band, making number 0000005 the first copy sold publicly; in 2008, it was purchased for £19,201 on eBay. In 2015, Ringo Starr's copy, number 0000001, sold for a world record $790,000 at auction. In an interview on the Impossible Way of Life podcast, it was first revealed by members of Hotline TNT that the winner of the auction was Jack White and that the album is currently held in the vault at the headquarters of Third Man Records in Nashville.

The sleeve included a poster comprising a montage of photographs, with the lyrics of the songs on the back, and a set of four photographic portraits taken by John Kelly. The photographs for the poster were assembled by Hamilton and McCartney, who sorted them in a variety of ways over several days before arriving at the final result.

During production, the album had the working title of A Doll's House. This was changed when the English progressive rock band Family released the similarly titled Music in a Doll's House earlier that year.

=== Sales ===
In the UK, The Beatles debuted at number one on 7 December 1968 and spent seven weeks at the top of the UK charts (including the entire competitive Christmas season), until it was replaced by the Seekers' Best of the Seekers on 25 January 1969, dropping to number 2. However, the album returned to the top spot the following week, spending an eighth and final week at number 1. The album was still high in the charts when the Beatles' follow-up album, Yellow Submarine, was released, which reached number 3. In all, The Beatles spent 22 weeks on the UK charts, far fewer than the 149 weeks for Sgt. Pepper. In September 2013, after the British Phonographic Industry changed their sales award rules, the album was declared as having gone platinum, meaning sales of at least 300,000 copies.

In the US, the album achieved huge commercial success. Capitol Records sold over 3.3 million copies of The Beatles to stores within the first four days of the album's release. It debuted at number 11 on 14 December 1968, jumped to number 2, and reached number 1 in its third week on 28 December, spending a total of nine weeks at the top. In all, The Beatles spent 215 weeks on the Billboard 200. The album has sold over 24 million copies in the US alone and according to the Recording Industry Association of America, The Beatles is the Beatles' most-certified album, at 24-times platinum.

== Critical reception ==
=== Contemporary reviews ===
On release, The Beatles gained highly favourable reviews from the majority of music critics. Others bemoaned its length or found that the music lacked the adventurous quality that had distinguished Sgt. Pepper. According to the author Ian Inglis: "Whether positive or negative, all assessments of The Beatles drew attention to its fragmentary style. However, while some complained about the lack of a coherent style, others recognized this as the album's raison d'être."

In The Observer, Tony Palmer wrote that "if there is still any doubt that Lennon and McCartney are the greatest songwriters since Schubert", the album "should surely see the last vestiges of cultural snobbery and bourgeois prejudice swept away in a deluge of joyful music making". Richard Goldstein of The New York Times considered the double album to be "a major success" and "far more imaginative" than Sgt. Pepper or Magical Mystery Tour, due to the band's improved songwriting and their relying less on the studio tricks of those earlier works. In The Sunday Times, Derek Jewell hailed it as "the best thing in pop since Sgt. Pepper" and concluded: "Musically, there is beauty, horror, surprise, chaos, order. And that is the world; and that is what The Beatles are on about. Created by, creating for, their age." Although he dismissed "Revolution 9" as a "pretentious" example of "idiot immaturity", the NME's Alan Smith declared "God Bless You, Beatles!" to the majority of the album. Jann Wenner of Rolling Stone called it "the history and synthesis of Western music", and the group's best album yet. Wenner contended that they were allowed to appropriate other styles and traditions into rock music because their ability and identity were "so strong that they make it uniquely theirs, and uniquely the Beatles. They are so good that they not only expand the idiom, but they are also able to penetrate it and take it further."

Among the less favourable critiques, Time magazine's reviewer wrote that The Beatles showcased the "best abilities and worst tendencies" of the Beatles, as it is skilfully performed and sophisticated, but lacks a "sense of taste and purpose". William Mann of The Times opined that, in their over-reliance on pastiche and "private jokes", Lennon and McCartney had ceased to progress as songwriters, yet he deemed the release to be "The most important musical event of the year" and acknowledged: "these 30 tracks contain plenty to be studied, enjoyed and gradually appreciated more fully in the coming months." In his review for The New York Times, Nik Cohn considered the album "boring beyond belief" and said that over half of its songs were "profound mediocrities". In a 1971 column, Robert Christgau of The Village Voice described the album as both "their most consistent and probably their worst", and referred to its songs as a "pastiche of musical exercises". Nonetheless, he ranked it as the tenth best album of 1968 in his ballot for Jazz & Pop magazine's annual critics poll.

=== Retrospective assessments ===
Professional ratings
Review scores
Source	Rating
AllMusic	5/5 stars
The A.V. Club	A+
The Daily Telegraph	5/5 stars
Encyclopedia of Popular Music	5/5 stars
MusicHound Rock	4/5
Pitchfork	10/10
PopMatters	9/10
Q	5/5 stars
The Rolling Stone Album Guide	5/5 stars
Slant Magazine	4.5/5 stars

In a 2003 appraisal of the album, for Mojo magazine, Ian MacDonald wrote that The Beatles regularly appears among the top 10 in critics' "best albums of all time" lists, yet it was a work that he deemed "eccentric, highly diverse, and very variable [in] quality". Rob Sheffield, writing in The Rolling Stone Album Guide (2004), said that its songs ranged from the Beatles' "sturdiest tunes since Revolver" to "self-indulgent filler". He derided tracks including "Revolution 9" and "Helter Skelter", but said that picking personal highlights was "part of the fun" for listeners. Writing for MusicHound in 1999, Guitar World editor Christopher Scapelliti described the album as "self-indulgent and at times unlistenable" but identified "While My Guitar Gently Weeps", "Happiness Is a Warm Gun" and "Helter Skelter" as "fascinating standouts" that made it a worthwhile purchase.

According to Slant Magazine's Eric Henderson, The Beatles is a rarity among the band's recorded works, in that it "resists reflexive canonisation, which, along with society's continued fragmentation, keeps the album fresh and surprising". In his review for AllMusic, Stephen Thomas Erlewine said that because of its wide variety of musical styles, the album can be "a frustratingly scattershot record or a singularly gripping musical experience, depending on your view". He concludes: "None of it sounds like it was meant to share album space together, but somehow The Beatles creates its own style and sound through its mess."

Among reviews of the 2009 remastered album, Neil McCormick of The Daily Telegraph found that even its worst songs work within the context of such an eclectic and unconventional collection, which he rated "one of the greatest albums ever made". Writing for Paste, Mark Kemp said The Beatles had been wrongly described as "three solo works in one (plus a Ringo song)", saying it "benefits from each member's wildly different ideas" and offers "two of Harrison's finest moments". In his review for The A.V. Club, Chuck Klosterman wrote that the album found the band at their best and rated it "almost beyond an A+". In retrospect, Christgau wrote in 2020 that while he still found the album "somewhat scattered", he nevertheless considers it worthy of a "high A minus". Contrary to many other retrospective assessments, John O'Reilly of The Guardian rated the album two stars out of five, stating: "Inside this mess of a double album is an OK single album whimpering to get out."

In 2000, The Beatles was voted fifth in the third edition of Colin Larkin's All Time Top 1000 Albums. Three years later, Rolling Stone ranked it tenth on the magazine's list of the "500 Greatest Albums of All Time", a position it maintained in the 2012 revised list. On the 40th anniversary of the album's release, the Vatican newspaper L'Osservatore Romano wrote that it "remains a type of magical musical anthology: 30 songs you can go through and listen to at will, certain of finding some pearls that even today remain unparalleled". In 2011, Kerrang! placed the album at number 49 on a list of "The 50 Heaviest Albums Of All Time". The magazine praised the guitar work in "Helter Skelter". The album was also included in the book 1001 Albums You Must Hear Before You Die. In September 2020, Rolling Stone ranked The Beatles at number 29 on its new list of the "500 Greatest Albums of All Time".

Contrary to the prevailing view of The Beatles, Giles Martin, son of George Martin and supervisor of the 2018 50th Anniversary remix, stated that after listening to all the demos and session tapes in preparation for the remix, came to the conclusion that he does not believe it was recorded by a band about to implode.

== Cultural responses ==
The release coincided with public condemnation of Lennon's treatment of Cynthia, and of his and Ono's joint projects, particularly Two Virgins. The British authorities similarly displayed a less tolerant attitude towards the Beatles, when London Drug Squad officers arrested Lennon and Ono in October 1968 for marijuana possession, a charge that he claimed was false.

=== Lyrical misinterpretations ===
The album's lyrics progressed from being vague to open-ended and prone to misinterpretation of authorial intention, such as "Glass Onion" (e.g., "the walrus was Paul") and "Piggies" ("what they need's a damn good whacking"). In the case of "Back in the U.S.S.R.", the words were interpreted by Christian evangelist David Noebel as further proof of the Beatles' compliance in a communist plot to brainwash American youth. According to MacDonald, the counterculture of the 1960s analysed The Beatles above and beyond all of the band's previous releases. Lennon's lyrics on "Revolution 1" were misinterpreted with messages he did not intend. In the album version, he advises those who "talk about destruction" to "count me out". Lennon then follows the sung word "out" with the spoken word "in". At the time of the album's release – which followed, chronologically, the up-tempo single version of the song, "Revolution" – that single word "in" was taken by the radical political left as Lennon's endorsement of politically motivated violence, which followed the May 1968 Paris riots. However, the album version was recorded first. (Note: Recording on "Revolution 1" began on 30 May, "Revolution" on 9 July.)

Charles Manson first heard the album not long after it was released. Manson may have found hidden meanings in songs from earlier Beatles albums, but, according to Vincent Bugliosi in The Beatles, Manson allegedly interpreted prophetic significance in several of the songs, including "Blackbird", "Piggies" (particularly the line "what they need's a damn good whacking"), "Helter Skelter", "Revolution 1" and "Revolution 9", and interpreted the lyrics as a sign of imminent violence or war. He and other members and associates of the Manson family repeatedly listened to it, and he allegedly told them that it was an apocalyptic message predicting an uprising of oppressed races, drawing parallels with chapter 9 of the Book of Revelation. Paul McCartney said, "Charles Manson interpreted that Helter Skelter was something to do with the four horsemen of the Apocalypse."

=== New Left and right-wing criticism ===
Further to the betrayal they had felt at Lennon's non-activist stance in "Revolution", New Left commentators condemned The Beatles for its failure to offer a political agenda. The Beatles themselves were accused of using eclecticism and pastiche as a means of avoiding important issues in the turbulent political and social climate. Jon Landau, writing for the Liberation News Service, argued that, particularly in "Piggies" and "Rocky Raccoon", the band had adopted parody because they were "afraid of confronting reality" and "the urgencies of the moment". Like Landau, many writers among the New Left considered the album outdated and irrelevant; instead, they heralded the Rolling Stones' concurrent release, Beggars Banquet, as what Lennon biographer Jon Wiener terms "the 'strong solution,' a musical turning outward, toward the political and social battles of the day". The song "Back in the U.S.S.R." also sparked a conservative backlash in the United States, with the John Birch Society claiming that the Beatles were promoting communism.

=== Popular music and postmodernism ===
Sociologists Michael Katovich and Wesley Longhofer write that the album's release created "a collective appreciation of it as a 'state-of-the-art' rendition of the current pop, rock, and folk-rock sounds". The majority of historians categorise The Beatles as postmodern, emphasising aesthetic and stylistic features of the album; (Note: According to author and music critic Kenneth Womack, the list of critical works referring to the White Album as postmodernist includes Henry W. Sullivan's The Beatles with Lacan: Rock 'n' Roll as Requiem for the Modern Age (1995), Ed Whitley's "The Postmodern White Album" (2000), David Quantick's Revolution: The Making of the Beatles' White Album (2002), Devin McKinney's Magic Circles: The Beatles in Dream and History (2003), and Jeffrey Roessner's "We All Want to Change the World: Postmodern Politics and the Beatles' White Album" (2006).) Inglis, for example, lists bricolage, fragmentation, pastiche, parody, reflexivity, plurality, irony, exaggeration, anti-representation and "meta-art", and says that it "has been designated as popular music's first postmodern album". Authors such as Fredric Jameson, Andrew Goodwin and Kenneth Womack instead situate all of the Beatles' work within a modernist stance, based either on their "artificiality" or their ideological stance of progress through love and peace. Scapelliti cites The Beatles as the source of "the freeform nihilism echoed … in the punk and alternative music genres". In his introduction to Rolling Stone's list of the "100 Greatest Beatles Songs", Elvis Costello comments on the band's pervasive influence into the 21st century and concludes: "The scope and license of the White Album has permitted everyone from OutKast to Radiohead to Green Day to Joanna Newsom to roll their picture out on a broader, bolder canvas."

In early 2013, the Recess Gallery in New York City's SoHo neighbourhood presented We Buy White Albums, an installation by artist Rutherford Chang. The piece was in the form of a record store in which nothing but original pressings of the LP was on display. Chang created a recording in which the sounds of one hundred copies of side one of the first LP were overlaid.

== Reissues ==
Tape versions of the album did not feature a white cover or the numbering system. Instead, cassette and 8-track versions (issued on two cassettes/cartridges in early 1969) contained cover artwork that featured high contrast black and white (with no grey) versions of the four Kelly photographs. These two-tape releases were both contained in black outer cardboard slipcase covers embossed with the words The Beatles and the outline of an apple in gold print. The songs on the cassette version of The Beatles are sequenced differently from the album, in order to equalise the lengths of the tape sides. Two reel-to-reel tape releases of the album were issued, both using the monochrome Kelly artwork. The first, issued by Apple/EMI in early 1969, packaged the entire double-LP on a single tape, with the songs in the same running order as on the LPs. The second release, licensed by Ampex from EMI in early 1970 after the latter ceased manufacture of commercial reel-to-reel tapes, was issued as two separate volumes, and sequenced the songs in the same manner as on the cassette version. The Ampex reel tape version of The Beatles has become desirable to collectors, as it contains edits on eight tracks not available elsewhere. (Note: "Dear Prudence", "Glass Onion", "Don't Pass Me By", "Why Don't We Do It in the Road?", "Yer Blues", "Helter Skelter", "Cry Baby Cry" and "Revolution 9".)

During 1978 and 1979, for the album's tenth anniversary, EMI reissued the album pressed on limited edition white vinyl in several countries. In 1981, Mobile Fidelity Sound Lab (MFSL) issued a unique half-speed master variation of the album using the sound from the original master recording. The discs were pressed on high-quality virgin vinyl.

The album was reissued, along with the rest of the Beatles catalogue, on compact disc in 1987. Unlike other Beatles CDs in this reissue campaign, the discs for The Beatles featured solid black-on-white labels instead of the then-conventional black-on-transparent, and releases that packaged each disc into a separate jewel case (rather than a multi-disc "fatbox") sported white media trays rather than the typical dark grey. Like the original vinyl pressings, these CD copies also featured individually stamped numbers on the album's front cover (in this case on the cover of the booklet for the first disc). It was reissued again on CD in 1998 as part of a 30th anniversary series for EMI, featuring a scaled-down replication of the original artwork, including the top-loader gatefold sleeve. This was part of a reissue series from EMI that included albums from other artists such as the Rolling Stones and Roxy Music. It was reissued again in 2009 in a new remastered edition.

A remixed and expanded edition of the album was released in 2018 to celebrate its 50th anniversary.

== Track listing ==
All tracks written by Lennon–McCartney, except where noted. Lead singer credits per Castleman and Podrazik's 1976 book All Together Now.

Side one
No.	Title	Lead vocals	Length
1.	"Back in the U.S.S.R."	McCartney	2:43
2.	"Dear Prudence"	Lennon	3:56
3.	"Glass Onion"	Lennon	2:18
4.	"Ob-La-Di, Ob-La-Da"	McCartney	3:08
5.	"Wild Honey Pie"	McCartney	0:52
6.	"The Continuing Story of Bungalow Bill"	Lennon with Yoko Ono	3:14
7.	"While My Guitar Gently Weeps" (George Harrison)	Harrison	4:45
8.	"Happiness Is a Warm Gun"	Lennon	2:47
Total length:			23:43

Side two
No.	Title	Lead vocals	Length
1.	"Martha My Dear"	McCartney	2:28
2.	"I'm So Tired"	Lennon	2:03
3.	"Blackbird"	McCartney	2:18
4.	"Piggies" (Harrison)	Harrison	2:04
5.	"Rocky Raccoon"	McCartney	3:33
6.	"Don't Pass Me By" (Richard Starkey)	Starr	3:51
7.	"Why Don't We Do It in the Road?"	McCartney	1:41
8.	"I Will"	McCartney	1:46
9.	"Julia"	Lennon	2:57
Total length:			22:41

Side three
No.	Title	Lead vocals	Length
1.	"Birthday"	McCartney with Lennon	2:42
2.	"Yer Blues"	Lennon	4:01
3.	"Mother Nature's Son"	McCartney	2:48
4.	"Everybody's Got Something to Hide Except Me and My Monkey"	Lennon	2:24
5.	"Sexy Sadie"	Lennon	3:15
6.	"Helter Skelter"	McCartney	4:30
7.	"Long, Long, Long" (Harrison)	Harrison	3:08
Total length:			22:48

Side four
No.	Title	Lead vocals	Length
1.	"Revolution 1"	Lennon	4:15
2.	"Honey Pie"	McCartney	2:41
3.	"Savoy Truffle" (Harrison)	Harrison	2:54
4.	"Cry Baby Cry"	Lennon with McCartney	3:02
5.	"Revolution 9"	Spoken word from Lennon, Harrison, Ono and George Martin	8:22
6.	"Good Night"	Starr	3:14
Total length:			24:28

== Personnel ==
The Beatles

- John Lennon – lead, harmony and background vocals; acoustic, lead, rhythm and bass guitars; piano, Hammond organ, harmonium, Mellotron; harmonica, saxophone mouthpiece; extra drums (on "Back in the U.S.S.R.") and assorted percussion (tambourine, handclaps and vocal percussion), tapes, tape loops and sound effects (electronic and home-made)
- Paul McCartney – lead, harmony and background vocals; bass, acoustic, lead and rhythm guitars; acoustic and electric pianos, Hammond organ; assorted percussion (timpani, tambourine, cowbell, hand shake bell, handclaps, foot taps and vocal percussion); drums (on "Back in the U.S.S.R.", "Dear Prudence", "Wild Honey Pie" and "Martha My Dear"); recorder
- George Harrison – lead, harmony and background vocals; lead, rhythm, acoustic and bass guitars; Hammond organ (on "While My Guitar Gently Weeps" and "Savoy Truffle"); extra drums (on "Back in the U.S.S.R.") and assorted percussion (tambourine, handclaps and vocal percussion) and sound effects
- Ringo Starr – drums and assorted percussion (tambourine, bongos, cymbals, maracas and vocal percussion); piano and sleigh bell (on "Don't Pass Me By"); lead vocals (on "Don't Pass Me By" and "Good Night") and backing vocals (on "The Continuing Story of Bungalow Bill")

Guest musicians

- Yoko Ono – backing vocals, lead vocals and handclaps on "The Continuing Story of Bungalow Bill", backing vocals on "Birthday", speech, tapes and sound effects on "Revolution 9"
- Mal Evans – backing vocals and handclaps on "Dear Prudence", handclaps on "Birthday", trumpet on "Helter Skelter"
- Eric Clapton – lead guitar on "While My Guitar Gently Weeps"
- Jack Fallon – violin on "Don't Pass Me By"
- Pattie Harrison – backing vocals on "Birthday"
- Jackie Lomax – backing vocals and handclaps on "Dear Prudence"
- John McCartney – backing vocals and handclaps on "Dear Prudence"
- Maureen Starkey – backing vocals on "The Continuing Story of Bungalow Bill"

Session musicians

- Ted Barker – trombone on "Martha My Dear"
- Leon Calvert – trumpet and flugelhorn on "Martha My Dear"
- Henry Datyner, Eric Bowie, Norman Lederman and Ronald Thomas – violin on "Glass Onion"
- Bernard Miller, Dennis McConnell, Lou Soufier and Les Maddox – violin on "Martha My Dear"
- Reginald Kilby – cello on "Glass Onion" and "Martha My Dear"
- Eldon Fox – cello on "Glass Onion"
- Frederick Alexander – cello on "Martha My Dear"
- Harry Klein – saxophone on "Savoy Truffle" and "Honey Pie"
- Dennis Walton, Ronald Chamberlain, Jim Chest and Rex Morris – saxophone on "Honey Pie"
- Raymond Newman and David Smith – clarinet on "Honey Pie"
- Art Ellefson, Danny Moss and Derek Collins – tenor sax on "Savoy Truffle"
- Ronnie Ross and Bernard George – baritone sax on "Savoy Truffle"
- Alf Reece – tuba on "Martha My Dear"
- The Mike Sammes Singers – backing vocals on "Good Night"
- Stanley Reynolds and Ronnie Hughes – trumpet on "Martha My Dear"
- Chris Shepard – stumpf fiddle on "The Continuing Story of Bungalow Bill"
- Tony Tunstall – French horn on "Martha My Dear"
- John Underwood and Keith Cummings – viola on "Glass Onion"
- Leo Birnbaum and Henry Myerscough – viola on "Martha My Dear"

Production

- George Martin – producer, executive producer; string, brass, clarinet, orchestral arrangements and conducting; piano on "Rocky Raccoon"
- Chris Thomas – producer; Mellotron on "The Continuing Story of Bungalow Bill", harpsichord on "Piggies", piano on "Long, Long, Long", electric piano, organ and saxophone arrangement on "Savoy Truffle"
- Ken Scott – engineer and mixer
- Geoff Emerick – engineer, speech on "Revolution 9"
- Barry Sheffield – engineer (Trident Studio)

== Charts ==
=== Weekly charts ===
Original release

Chart (1968–70)	Position
Australian Kent Music Report Chart	1
Canadian RPM Albums Chart	1
Finland (Suomen virallinen lista)	1
French Albums Chart	1
Norwegian VG-lista Albums Chart	1
Swedish Kvällstoppen Albums Chart	1
Spanish Albums Chart	1
UK Albums Chart	1
US Billboard Top LPs	1
West German Media Control Albums Chart	1

1987 reissue

Chart (1987)	Position
Dutch Mega Albums Chart	23
Japanese Oricon Albums Chart	4
UK Albums Chart	18

2009 reissue

Chart (2009)	Peak position
Australian Albums Chart	15
Austrian Albums Chart	21
Belgian Albums Chart (Flanders)	18
Belgian Albums Chart (Wallonia)	23
Danish Albums Chart	16
Finnish Albums Chart	33
German Albums Chart	31
Italian FIMI Albums Chart	20
Japanese Albums Chart	19
Portuguese Albums Chart	6
Spanish Albums Chart	30
Swedish Albums Chart	11
Swiss Albums Chart	27
New Zealand Albums Chart	23
UK Albums Chart	21
US Billboard Top Pop Catalog Albums	7

2018 reissue

Chart (2018)	Peak position
Canadian Albums (Billboard)	9
German Albums (Offizielle Top 100)	3
Polish Albums (ZPAV)	44
Spanish Albums (Promusicae)	7
Swedish Albums (Sverigetopplistan)	1
US Billboard 200	6

=== Year-end charts ===
Original release

Chart (1968)	Position
UK Albums Chart	2
Chart (1969)	Position
Australian Albums Chart	2
UK Albums Chart	10
US Billboard Pop Albums	8

2018 reissue

Chart (2019)	Position
US Billboard 200	162

=== Decade-end charts ===
Chart (1960s)	Position
UK Albums Chart	9

== Certifications and sales ==
Certifications and sales for The Beatles
Region	Certification	Certified units/sales
Argentina (CAPIF) Listed as "Album Blanco"	Platinum	60,000^{^}
Argentina (CAPIF) Listed as "The White Album"	Gold	30,000^{^}
Australia (ARIA)	2× Platinum	140,000^{^}
Canada (Music Canada)	8× Platinum	800,000^{^}
Canada (Music Canada) 2009 release	Gold	40,000^{^}
Denmark (IFPI Danmark)	Gold	10,000^{‡}
France (SNEP)	Gold	100,000^{*}
Italy (FIMI) sales since 2009	Platinum	50,000^{‡}
New Zealand (RMNZ)	2× Platinum	30,000^{^}
United Kingdom (BPI) Sales since 2009	2× Platinum	600,000^{^}
United States (RIAA)	24× Platinum	12,000,000^{‡}
^{*} Sales figures based on certification alone.^{^} Shipments figures based on certification alone.^{‡} Sales+streaming figures based on certification alone.

^{†} BPI certification awarded only for sales since 1994.

== Release history ==
Release history for The Beatles
Country	Date	Label	Format	Catalogue number
United Kingdom	22 November 1968	Apple (Parlophone)	LP	PMC 7067/8 (mono) /PCS 7067/8 (stereo)
United States	25 November 1968	Apple, Capitol	LP	SWBO-101 (stereo)
Worldwide reissue	24 August 1987	Apple, EMI	CD	CDP 7 46443 8
United Kingdom	23 November 1998	Apple	CD (30th Anniversary numbered limited edition)	4 96895 2
Japan	21 January 2004	Toshiba-EMI	Remastered LP	TOJP 60139/40
Worldwide reissue	9 September 2009	Apple	Remastered CD	3 82466 2
Worldwide reissue	13 November 2012	Apple	Remastered LP	3824661
Worldwide reissue	9 September 2014	Apple	Remastered Mono LP	734535
Worldwide reissue	9 November 2018	Apple, Universal Music Group International	Remixed 4xLP / 2xLP / 3xCD / 6xCD+Blu-ray box set	6757201, 6769686, 6757133, 6757195

== See also ==
- List of best-selling albums in the United States
- Outline of the Beatles
- The Beatles timeline
- The Beatles albums discography
