= Honey Pie =

- Cover of the song's sheet music

Song by the Beatles

from the album The Beatles
- Released: 22 November 1968
- Recorded: 1–2, 4 October 1968
- Studio: EMI, London
- Genre: Ragtime; vaudeville; music hall
- Length: 2:41
- Label: Apple
- Songwriter: Lennon–McCartney
- Producer: George Martin

"Honey Pie" is a song by the English rock band the Beatles, from their 1968 double album The Beatles (also known as the "White Album"). The song was written entirely by Paul McCartney and credited to the Lennon–McCartney partnership.

== Interpretation ==
The song is a direct homage to the British music hall style. It concerns a famed actress, called only by the term of endearment "Honey Pie", who becomes famous in the United States, and her old lover, who wishes for her to rejoin him in England. The premise – a humble admirer yearning for the return of his lover – is not unlike a typical music hall plot. To establish an appropriate, old-timey sound, the band added the third line, "Now she's hit the big time!", along with "crackles" taken from a 78 rpm record. The song begins with a slower intro, and becomes fast after that.

The song also contains a saxophone and clarinet arrangement. The clarinets, according to Alan W. Pollack, "produce water sprays in parallel thirds" and the saxophones play in tight harmony.

== Recording ==
Recording began on 1 October 1968, at Trident Studios in London's Wardour Street. Only one take was recorded on the first day, although it is likely that a number of rehearsal attempts had previously been recorded and wiped. The next day, McCartney taped his lead vocals, and a lead guitar part was added. According to George Harrison, John Lennon played the guitar solo. The song's woodwind arrangement by George Martin was recorded two days later on 4 October. McCartney added a final vocal overdub at the end of the session.

The Beatles recorded a demo of Honey Pie at George Harrison's Esher home studios before recording sessions for the album began. This version contained slightly different lyrics and lacked the introduction of the final version. The demo was later released in 1996 on Anthology 3 and the 2018 Super Deluxe edition of The Beatles album.

== Legacy ==
In interviews for his 1997 book Many Years from Now, McCartney reflected kindly on the song, stating "it's a nod to the vaudeville tradition I was raised on". McCartney’s father Jim had led a jazz band in the 1920s. Lennon remembered the song less fondly. When asked about the track in a 1980 Playboy interview, he laughed: "I don't even want to think about that."

Coinciding with the 50th anniversary of its release, Jacob Stolworthy of The Independent listed "Honey Pie" at number 25 in his ranking of the White Album's 30 tracks. He wrote: "A catchy if uninspiring homage to music hall entertainment from a wartime-era that succeeds in feeling fresh." He called the song one of McCartney's weaker tracks.

In his book Revolution in the Head, Ian MacDonald describes "Honey Pie" as having "a catchy tune, the correct period harmonic design, and all the proper passing chords". Dave Rybs of "Beatles Music History" called the song "underrated".

Although Lennon's guitar solo is only four bars long, Guitar Player contributor Christopher Scapelliti praised it as being "stylistically, it's right on the money." Harrison also praised Lennon's guitar solo, saying "John played a brilliant solo on 'Honey Pie'. Sounded like Django Reinhardt or something. It was one of them where you just close your eyes and happen to hit all the right notes — sounded like a little jazz solo."

== Cover versions ==
The song has been covered by Alan Klein (1969), Barbra Streisand, Jack Sheldon, the King's Singers, Don Partridge, the Golden Gate Quartet, Tuck & Patti, and John Pizzarelli, English folk-rock duo Therapy on their album One Night Stand, among others. In the 1978 film Sextette, Dom DeLuise performed the song. Phish covered the song, with the rest of the "White Album", on the album Live Phish Volume 13.

In 2016 Wesley Schultz sang it in Beat Bugs episode 12b.

== Personnel ==
The Beatles

- Paul McCartney – vocal, piano
- John Lennon – rhythm guitar, lead guitar
- George Harrison – six-stringed bass
- Ringo Starr – drums

Additional musicians

- George Martin – saxophone and clarinet arrangement
- Harry Klein – saxophone
- Dennis Walton – saxophone
- Ronald Chamberlain – saxophone
- Jim Chester – saxophone
- Rex Morris – saxophone
- Raymond Newman – clarinet
- David Smith – clarinet
