= Henry Myerscough =

British violist

Henry Myerscough (1929 – 2006) was a British violist.

In addition to solo work and teaching, he formed the Fidelio Quartet with his brother, the violinist Clarence Myerscough, and performed for many years as a session musician, including The Beatles' "White" Album and Quatermass.

He played a viola by luthier Gasparo da Salò.

His daughter is Seona Myerscough, whose dancing inadvertently provided the name for the electronic duo Seona Dancing, an act whose members were fellow students Bill Macrae and Ricky Gervais.
