= Martha My Dear =

- Cover of the Maclen Music sheet music

Song by the Beatles

from the album The Beatles
- Released: 22 November 1968
- Recorded: 4–5 October 1968
- Studio: Trident, London
- Genre: Music hall; pop rock
- Length: 2:28
- Label: Apple
- Songwriter: Lennon–McCartney
- Producer: George Martin

"Martha My Dear" is a song by the English rock band the Beatles from their 1968 double album The Beatles (also known as the "White Album"). Credited to Lennon–McCartney, the song was written solely by Paul McCartney, and was named after his Old English Sheepdog, Martha.

The song has been covered by several artists, including Slade, Herb Alpert & The Tijuana Brass, Phish, World Party, Fools Garden, and Les Boréades de Montréal.

== Style and form ==
The song incorporates elements from pop rock music; it also features a music hall-inspired piano line that recurs throughout the piece, as well as a brass section. The song modulates through several keys.

The song is notated mainly in the key of E♭ major, showing up embellished chords with jazzy sprinkled dissonances. The verse is a syncopated replication of the first melodic section adding two extra beats, a technique similar to that used later by McCartney in "Two of Us". Though the bridge is in the key of F major, the manner in which it abruptly sets in and exits makes it sound more out-of-the-way than it really is.

== Recording ==
According to Beatles biographers Ian MacDonald and Mark Lewisohn, "Martha My Dear" is one of the few songs by the band in which McCartney played all the instruments, except for the orchestral instruments played by session musicians. The song was recorded over two days on 4 and 5 October 1968 at Trident Studios in London. McCartney recorded the piano, drums and vocals on the first day. He was advised to have producer George Martin play the piano solo because it was believed that the solo was beyond McCartney's competency, but McCartney persisted. Martin's brass and string arrangements were overdubbed later that day. On 5 October, McCartney re-recorded his vocals, added handclaps, and overdubbed bass and guitar parts, completing the song that day.

== Legacy ==
Coinciding with the 50th anniversary of its release, Jacob Stolworthy of The Independent listed "Martha My Dear" at number 20 in his ranking of the White Album's 30 tracks. He called the song "one of the album's most unfairly maligned tracks" and "irresistibly charming".

== Personnel ==
The Beatles

- Paul McCartney – double-tracked lead vocals, piano, bass, drums, handclaps
- George Harrison – electric guitar
- Ringo Starr – drums

Additional musicians

- Bernard Mille, Dennis McConnell, Lou Sofier, Les Maddox – violins
- Leo Birnbaum, Henry Myerscough – violas
- Reginald Kilby, Frederick Alexander, Peter Halling – cellos
- Leon Calvert – trumpet, flugelhorn
- Stan Reynolds, Ronnie Hughes – trumpets
- Tony Tunstall – French horn
- Ted Barker – trombone
- Alf Reece – tuba

String and brass arrangement by George Martin.
