= Good Night (Beatles song) =

1968 song by the Beatles

- Cover of the song's sheet music

Song by the Beatles

from the album The Beatles
- Released: 22 November 1968
- Recorded: 28 June, 2, 22 July 1968
- Studio: EMI, London
- Genre: Lullaby
- Length: 3:11
- Label: Apple
- Songwriter: Lennon–McCartney
- Producer: George Martin

"Good Night" is a song by the English rock band the Beatles from their 1968 double album The Beatles (also known as the "White Album"). It was written by John Lennon and credited to Lennon–McCartney. The lead vocalist on the recording is Ringo Starr, who was the only Beatle to appear on the track. The accompaniment was provided by an orchestra arranged and conducted by George Martin. Written for Lennon's five-year-old son Julian, "Good Night" is the closing track on The Beatles.

== Writing and recording ==
John Lennon wrote the song as a lullaby for his five-year-old son Julian.

The original version of "Good Night" featured Starr on lead vocal, George Harrison and John Lennon playing the melody on guitars, and Paul McCartney singing a harmony. Take 10 with a guitar part from take 5 was released on the 2018 50th Anniversary box set of The Beatles.

During rehearsals for the song on 28 June, the band arrangement was reduced to Lennon on piano and Harrison playing percussion. A fragment from this rehearsal and take 22 of the song, along with an overdub of the orchestra from the close of the released version, is heard on the Beatles' 1996 compilation album Anthology 3.

Lennon recalled asking George Martin to give the song a lush orchestral arrangement in the style of old Hollywood films and admitted, "Yeah, corny". The orchestra comprised 26 musicians: 12 violins, three violas, three cellos, one harp, three flutes, one clarinet, one horn, one vibraphone and one string bass. Eight members of the Mike Sammes Singers also took part in the recording, providing backing vocals.

== Reception ==
In musicologist Walter Everett's view, "Good Night" uses chords that are uncharacteristic of Lennon's writing, and its countermelodies and musical interludes are more typical of Martin's music, particularly the compositions that show the influence of Maurice Ravel, his favourite composer. Everett concludes: "I have difficulty settling into 'Good Night' after 'Revolution 9' dies away, but most no doubt take it as a welcome bromide".

Coinciding with the 50th anniversary of its release, Jacob Stolworthy of The Independent listed "Good Night" at number 28 in his ranking of the White Album's 30 tracks. He called the track "a mediocre song sung by Ringo". He continued: "Despite a vibrant orchestral arrangement from George Martin, 'Good Night' – like all lullabies – might put you to sleep".

Rolling Stone magazine referred to it as "a Gloriously Weird revelation", and "the most surprising discovery here, as it evolves through three drastically different versions".

== Other recordings and uses ==
The song has been recorded by several performers, including the Carpenters, Kenny Loggins (feat. Alison Krauss), Kidsongs, Linda Ronstadt, Noni Hazlehurst, and Manhattan Transfer. Barbra Streisand recorded it in 1969 for her album What About Today? In 2006, Cirque du Soleil included a version in their Beatles-themed production Love. Ekkehard Ehlers's track "Plays John Cassavetes 2" (on his 2002 album, Plays) is built from a 6-second instrumental sample from the song.

== Personnel ==
According to Ian MacDonald:

The Beatles

- Ringo Starr – vocal

Additional musicians

- George Martin – celesta, orchestral arrangement
- The Mike Sammes Singers – backing vocals
- Unnamed session musicians – 12 violins, three violas, three celli, double bass, three flutes, clarinet, horn, vibraphone, harp
