= Jack Fallon =

British jazz bassist (1915–2006)

- Born: John Patrick Fallon; October 13, 1915; London, Ontario, Canada
- Died: May 22, 2006 (aged 90) London, England
- Genre: Jazz
- Occupation: Musician
- Instruments: Double bass; violin
- Years active: 1940–1998

John Patrick Fallon (October 13, 1915 – May 22, 2006) was a Canadian-born British jazz bassist.

Fallon played violin and studied with London Symphony Orchestra founder Bruce Sharpe before making double-bass his primary instrument in 1935, when he was 20 years old. During World War II he played in a dance band in the Royal Canadian Air Force, and settled in Britain after his discharge. He joined the band of Ted Heath in 1946, and played bebop in London clubs in his spare time. In 1947 he played with Ronnie Scott and Tommy Whittle at the Melody Maker/Columbia Jazz Rally, and following this worked with Jack Jackson (1947), George Shearing (1948), Duke Ellington (1948), and Django Reinhardt (1949). Soon after playing with Reinhardt, he played in a Count Basie ensemble which also included Malcolm Mitchell and Tony Crombie; he played with both of them after leaving Basie, working together with Hoagy Carmichael and Maxine Sullivan and touring in Sweden together with Reinhardt and Stéphane Grappelli. His bass is from da Salo.

Fallon worked in the 1950s as an accompanist to Mary Lou Williams, Sarah Vaughan, and Lena Horne, and also served as a sideman in the ensembles of Humphrey Lyttelton, Kenny Baker, and Ralph Sharon. Additionally, he was house bassist at Lansdowne Studios. He worked outside of jazz with blues musicians such as Big Bill Broonzy and Josh White, and played with Johnny Duncan's Blue Grass Boys. As the bass guitar became more popular, Fallon became a champion of its use, and played both instruments in the latter part of his career.

Fallon was also involved in the industry as a booker and promoter, having established the booking agency Cana Variety in 1952. Cana booked primarily jazz artists in its early stages but expanded to rock acts in the 1960s, including The Beatles and The Rolling Stones. Because of this connection, Fallon was asked by the Beatles to play the violin fiddle-style on the song "Don't Pass Me By" in 1968.

In 1957, Fallon married Jean Lovell and they had three children. Fallon continued to play jazz locally in London and in the studios into the 1990s. He retired from performing in 1998 due to ill health. In 2002, he was awarded the Freedom of the City of London. He published a memoir entitled From the Top in 2005, and died the following year at age 90. His funeral was held on June 7, 2006 in London. In 2015, he was posthumously inducted into the London Music Hall of Fame (in London, Ontario).
