= Mike Sammes =

English musician and vocal arranger (1928–2001)

- The Mike Sammes Singers (Sammes is third from left)

Background information
- Born: Michael William Sammes; 19 February 1928; Reigate, England
- Died: 19 May 2001 (aged 73)
- Genre: Pop
- Occupations: Vocal arranger Session musician/singer
- Years active: 1950s–1980s
- Label: Disneyland Records
- Formerly of: Mike Sammes Singers

Michael William Sammes (19 February 1928 – 19 May 2001) was an English musician and vocal session arranger, performing backing vocals (mostly with his mixed voice choir The Mike Sammes Singers) on many pop music tracks recorded in the UK from 1955 into the 1970s. According to Spencer Leigh, he sang on more chart successes than any other performer.

== Career ==
Born in Reigate, Surrey, Sammes was the son of pioneer photographer and film-maker Rowland Sammes, owner of Wray Park Studios. He began his interest in music by learning the cello and played in the school orchestra at Reigate Grammar School. He then worked briefly for the music publisher Chappell & Co. in London. Sammes returned to music after national service in the RAF in the late 1940s, and in 1954 joined a vocal group called The Coronets at the urging of fellow musician Bill Shepherd. The Coronets did back-up work for the Big Ben Banjo Band and recorded for Columbia Records, releasing some covers of current hits.

After Shepherd withdrew, Sammes persisted. By 1957, he had assembled the core group that would form the Mike Sammes Singers – Sammes himself along with John O'Neill, Irene King, Enid Hurd (Enid Heard), Mike Redway, Ross Gilmour, Valerie Bain, Marion Gay (the wife of actor Peter Madden) and Mel Todd. They were soon engaged for film soundtracks, television and radio jingles, working sometimes as many as four sessions in a day and up to six days a week. Mike Sammes was Mr Sowerberry on the 1960 soundtrack (World Record Club) of the Lionel Bart musical Oliver! and the Michael (sic) Sammes Singers also featured. They appeared on the Morecambe and Wise Show (on 29 January 1966) in the sketch "The Ernie Wise Male Voice Choir".

The singers performed the title themes for three of Gerry Anderson's shows, Supercar, Stingray, and The Secret Service. The group recorded many albums under its own name or in conjunction with various orchestras and conductors, including a series of studio versions of current West End musicals. In addition, they performed on numerous albums for Disneyland Records. They featured on many UK hit singles from the late 1950s and throughout the 1960s, with Ronnie Hilton, Tommy Steele, Anthony Newley, Cliff Richard, Tom Jones, Englebert Humperdink and others.

Departing from their usual mainstream commercial style, The Mike Sammes Singers were hired to provide backing vocals for the Beatles' song "I Am the Walrus", which required them to do "all sorts of swoops and phonetic noises" and chant the phrases "ho ho ho, he he he, ha ha ha", "oompah, oompah, stick it up your jumper" and "everybody's got one". They also sang on the Beatles' "Good Night", as well as on their last album, Let It Be, at the behest of Phil Spector. Sammes also provided the distinctive basso backing vocals on Olivia Newton-John's early country crossover hits, including "Banks of the Ohio", "Let Me Be There" and "If You Love Me (Let Me Know)". Despite this productivity, his group, the Mike Sammes Singers, have only one entry in The Guinness Book of British Hit Singles, for "Somewhere My Love" in July 1967. Sammes rewrote the song "Marianne" with Bill Owen to provide Cliff Richard with a minor hit in September 1968.

The Mike Sammes Singers remained active into the 1970s, producing recordings for television (The Secret Service) and appearing on the small screen (the Val Doonican Show, 1971). In 1974 the singers provided the backing vocals for Steve Harley's hit single "Mr. Soft", and also contributed vocals on other tracks on his album The Psychomodo." By the mid-1970s, though, the demand for backing vocals had faded considerably, due to the introduction of multi-tracking and synthesizers. On Last of the Summer Wine, the singers contributed the "Summer Wine" song over the opening credits of the Christmas 1983 episode "Getting Sam Home".

== Personal life ==
Mike Sammes lived for many years in a flat in Elstree, close to the television studios, where his long-term partner was Enid Hurd (one of his singers). She died in 1993, and Sammes later moved back to Reigate to look after his elderly mother. He published his autobiography in 1994. He died at the age of 73 in Reigate, several months after a fall from which he never fully recovered. Jonny Trunk, of Trunk Records, was able to recover a number of reel-to-reel tapes from Sammes' house (despite it having been ransacked by house clearance), which he went on to compile as Music for Biscuits, so-named because it featured 1960s/1970s advertising jingles for Tuc biscuits, etc.

== Works ==
=== Original albums and soundtracks ===
- The Melody Moves!, Fontana TFL 5070 (1959)
- Let's Get Away From It All, Fontana TFL 594 (1962)
- Queue for Song (Knightsbridge Chorale), Top Rand 35/053 (1963)
- The Mike Sammes Singers (with Ken Thorne), HMV CLP 1801 (1964), released in US as From England, With Love, United Artists (1965)
- Smooth, Music for Pleasure MFP 1372 (1964)
- Stage 12 With the Showstoppers, World Record Club TP445 (1964)
- There'll Always be Spring (with Ken Thorne), HMV POP 1341 (1964)
- Sammes Session, World Record Club WRC T455 (1965)
- Sounds Sensational, Studio Two TWO 111 (1965)
- South Pacific (with Sam Fonteyn), Fanfare SIT 60007 (1965)
- Handful of Songs (with Johnny Harris), United Artists UAS 6607 (1966)
- Somewhere My Love, HMV CLP 3621 (1966)
- Colour It Folksy, World Record Club – T747 (1967)
- A Festival of Carols, (Sinfonia of London and the Michael Sammes Chorale), World Record Club (1967)
- The Jungle Book (with Geoff Love), Music for Pleasure MFP 1027 (1967)
- Man of La Mancha (with Tutti Camarata), Vista 4027 (1967)
- Somewhere My Love and Other Hits, HMV CLP 3621 (1967)
- Chelsea Squares, World Record Club WRC T448 (1968)
- Finian's Rainbow (with Tutti Camarata), Music for Pleasure MFP 1293 (1968)
- Hymns A'Swinging, (with organist Ted Taylor), Davjon DJ 1006 (1968)
- White Christmas (with organ and chimes), Compose S98032 (1969)
- Paint Your Wagon (with Brian Fahey), Music for Pleasure MFP 1390 (1970)
- Cole (hits of Cole Porter), EMI EMC 3049 (1974)
- And I Love You So, Music for Pleasure MFP SPR90015 (1974)
- Joseph and the Amazing Technicolor Dreamcoat (with Paul Jones, Geoff Love), Music for Pleasure MFP 50455 (1979)
- Thomas and the King (original cast recording), TERS 1009 (1981)
- Just for You, LNV Records LNC 001 (1987)
- It Had To Be You, Avid AVC564 CD (1996)
- Barbara Cartland's Favorite Love Songs, Rajon NL688696 CD (1998)

=== As backing singers ===
- Ronnie Hilton, "No Other Love" (1956 single, UK No. 1)
- Tommy Steele, "Singing the Blues" (1957 single, UK No. 1) and "Handful of Songs" (1957 single, UK No. 5)
- Cliff Richard and the Drifters, "Schoolboy Crush" (1958 single, b-side to "Move it")
- Ronnie Hilton, "I May Never Pass This Way Again" (1958 single, UK No. 27)
- Michael Holliday, "Starry Eyed" (1960 single, UK No. 1)
- Anthony Newley, "Strawberry Fair" (1960 single, UK No. 3)
- Helen Shapiro. "Walkin' Back to Happiness" (1961 single, UK No. 1)
- Cliff Richard and the Shadows, The Young Ones (1962 album, four tracks)
- Cliff Richard and the Shadows, Summer Holiday (1963 album, four tracks)
- Ken Dodd. "Tears", (1965 single, UK No. 1)
- Ronnie Hilton, "A Windmill in Old Amsterdam" (1965 single, UK No. 23)
- Tom Jones, "Green, Green Grass of Home" (1966 single, UK No. 1)
- Des O'Connor, '"Careless Hands" (1967 single, UK No. 6)
- The Beatles, "I Am The Walrus" (1967 single, UK No. 1)
- Whistling Jack Smith, "I Was Kaiser Bill's Batman" (1967 single, UK, No. 5)
- Engelbert Humperdinck, "The Last Waltz" (1967 single, UK No. 1)
- The Beatles, "Good Night" (album track, 1968)
- Tom Jones, "Delilah" (1968)
- The Beatles, "The Long and Winding Road" (album track, 1970)
- Paul McCartney. Thrillington (1977 album, recorded 1971)

=== Film and television ===
- Supercar (TV series 1961)
- Young, Willing and Eager (1961 film)
- Stork Talk (1962 film)
- Here Come the Girls (TV series) 1963
- Frank Ifield Sings (TV Series) 1965, as Mike Sammes Singers
- Presenting Johnny Mathis (TV Movie) 1965, as Mike Sammes Singers
- The Bed-Sit Girl (TV Series 1966)
- Don't Lose Your Head (1967 film)
- The Benny Hill Show (TV special 1967)
- Oh, Brother! (TV series 1968–1970)
- Saturday Stars (TV series) 1968 as Mike Sammes Singers, with Engelbert Humperdinck and Tony Bennett
- Q... (TV series) 1969
- A Song for Everyone (UK TV Series 1969)
- The Assassination Bureau (1969 Film) "Life Is a Precious Thing" as Mike Sammes Singers
- Youth Comes to Britain (Documentary short) 1970
- The Sky's the Limit (TV series 1970)
- Kraft Music Hall Presents:The Des O'Connor Show (TV series 1971)
- It's Cliff Richard (TV series 1972)
- Patrick, Dear Patrick an Evening with Patrick Cargill and His Guests (TV movie) 1972
- Oh, Father! (TV series 1973)
- Tiffany Jones (1973 film)
- Welcome Home to ITV (1979, promo, never commercially released)
- Last of the Summer Wine (TV series 1983)
