= Across the Universe (soundtrack) =

Across the Universe (Music from the Motion Picture)

Soundtrack album by various artists
- Released: September 14, 2007
- Genre: Film soundtrack; pop; rock; dance; classical; jazz
- Length: Standard edition: 52:30; Deluxe edition: 100:15 (digital); 95:14 (physical)
- Label: Interscope
- Producer: T Bone Burnett; Elliot Goldenthal; Matthias Gohl

Singles from Across the Universe (Music from the Motion Picture)
- 1. "It Won't Be Long" Released: September 11, 2007

The soundtrack to the 2007 jukebox musical romantic drama film Across the Universe directed by Julie Taymor, features songs from the Beatles, on which the film was centered and itself based on the song of the same name by Lennon–McCartney. It features 34 Beatles compositions that are incorporated for the film and sung by the lead cast, Evan Rachel Wood, Jim Sturgess, Joe Anderson, T. V. Carpio, Dana Fuchs, Martin Luther McCoy, Bono, Eddie Izzard, Joe Cocker and Salma Hayek. The album is compiled and produced by T Bone Burnett, Matthias Gohl and Elliot Goldenthal. Goldenthal who previously worked on Taymor's Titus (1999) and Frida (2002), had composed the film's original score, which is also included in the album.

The album was released as Across the Universe (Music from the Motion Picture) by Interscope Records on September 14, 2007, debuting a 16-track album featuring half of the songs heard in the film. A deluxe edition was released on October 2, 2007 featuring all the songs performed by the cast, as well as an incidental score composed by Goldenthal. The physical edition of the album omitted two tracks: "Why Don't We Do It in the Road?" and "I Want You (She's So Heavy)". The album met with positive critical response and was nominated for Best Compilation Soundtrack Album for Motion Pictures, Television or Other Visual Media, and lost to Love (2006), a remix album featuring songs performed by the Beatles.

== Critical reception ==
=== Initial ===
Initially, the album received mixed critical response. Benjamin Baxter of The Collegian wrote "With exceptions like these, it's a pity that the "Across the Universe" soundtrack is evenly divided with inspired covers and those that rest heavily on their lyrical laurels." Stephen Thomas Erlewine of AllMusic wrote "Across the Universe falls prey to the curse of jukebox musicals on Broadway -- no matter how good or how bad the music is, it ultimately only whets the appetite for the original recordings, which is certainly the case here." Sputnik Music wrote "Ambitious risks are certainly not alien to the daring Julie Taymor. However, by taking on a catalog such as that of The Beatles and attempting to revamp it into a musical film, Taymor's work falls dramatically short of expectations, sounding painfully average. For casual listeners of The Beatles work, the soundtrack for "Across The Universe" may be a joyous experience. For those that adore the classic Beatles' catalog, it may prove to be an infuriating listen." Peter Hartlaub of SFGate wrote "With Taymor playing DJ, the 33-song soundtrack includes a nice mix of obscurities and surefire crowd-pleasers. And the hits are often given a fresh perspective."

In a positive note, Jonathan Broxton felt that "The music in the film is generally successful because the arrangements and performances seem to be just right for each particular moment in the film (if not for the radio)." Reviewing for Goldenthal's score, he said "Goldenthal tosses out twenty minutes or so of inventive score music that ranges from wacky dissonance to guitar-heavy ambience. It's mostly smaller, ensemble-driven material that shows off Goldenthal at his most carefree and experimental. It's a shame none of it was included on the soundtrack album. Goldenthal puts most of his work into doing song arrangements, the ever-popular T. Bone Burnett works on some of these as well. Goldenthal would seem to be the last person on earth someone would think of to do pop song arrangements, but considering that he is married to director Julie Taymor (and has done all of her previous films), it makes sense. He does a fine job, too… most of the songs with flaws have vocal problems, not instrumental ones."

=== Retrospective ===
Retrospective reviews were more positive. Revisiting the film after 10 years, Jami Ganz of Entertainment Weekly felt that "Though it's a bit polarizing amongst diehard Beatles fans, the film can definitely be credited with creatively reinventing the band that changed music, alongside visuals that are…incredible, to say the least." Elena Nicolaou of Refinery29 also admitted "the movie's magic isn't found in historical accuracy, or the believability of its romance. It's found in the music. Think of Across the Universe as a visual album devoted to the most iconic music ever — music that has woven together three generations and counting. If Across the Universe achieves a quality of timelessness, it's because the music, written by the Beatles 60 years ago, has too."

Phoebe Macrossan of The Conversation wrote that "Taymor uses The Beatles as a recognisable language. The characters take ownership of the songs' sentiments, using popular music in the way ordinary people do all the time. While Mamma Mia! completely decoupled ABBA's songs from their origin, Across The Universe involves the audience in remembering The Beatles' music, deploying these memories to make sense of the film and its reworking of the 1960s [...] the Beatles' songs allow the audience insight into young characters who struggle with identity, expression and emotional development. With glorious artistic direction and enthusiastic choreography, Taymor reworks the famous lyrics for new characters and a new narrative."

== Commercial response ==
The deluxe edition of the soundtrack topped the first position as the most downloaded album on iTunes from October 15–17, and 22–23, 2007.

== Track listing ==
=== Standard edition ===
No.	Title	Performer(s)	Length
1.	"All My Loving"	Jim Sturgess	2:33
2.	"I Want to Hold Your Hand"	T. V. Carpio	2:46
3.	"It Won't Be Long"	Evan Rachel Wood	2:19
4.	"I've Just Seen a Face"	Jim Sturgess	1:51
5.	"Let It Be"	Carol Woods and Timothy Mitchum	2:34
6.	"Come Together"	Joe Cocker	4:26
7.	"I Am the Walrus"	Bono and Secret Machines	4:47
8.	"Something"	Jim Sturgess	3:02
9.	"Oh! Darling"	Dana Fuchs and Martin Luther McCoy	2:30
10.	"Strawberry Fields Forever"	Jim Sturgess and Joe Anderson	3:37
11.	"Across the Universe"	Jim Sturgess	3:29
12.	"Helter Skelter"	Dana Fuchs	3:44
13.	"Happiness is a Warm Gun"	Joe Anderson feat. Salma Hayek	3:11
14.	"Blackbird"	Evan Rachel Wood	3:06
15.	"Hey Jude"	Joe Anderson	4:11
16.	"Lucy in the Sky with Diamonds"	Bono with The Edge	4:24
Total length:			52:30

=== Deluxe edition ===
==== Physical formats ====
Disc 1
No.	Title	Performer(s)	Length
1.	"Girl"	Jim Sturgess	1:04
2.	"Hold Me Tight"	Evan Rachel Wood	2:36
3.	"All My Loving"	Jim Sturgess	2:27
4.	"I Want to Hold Your Hand"	T. V. Carpio	2:47
5.	"With a Little Help From My Friends"	Jim Sturgess and Joe Anderson	3:13
6.	"It Won't Be Long"	Evan Rachel Wood	2:18
7.	"I've Just Seen a Face"	Jim Sturgess	1:50
8.	"Let It Be"	Carol Woods and Timothy Mitchum	3:48
9.	"Come Together"	Joe Cocker	4:28
10.	"If I Fell"	Evan Rachel Wood	2:39
11.	"Dear Prudence"	Joe Anderson, Dana Fuchs, Jim Sturgess, Evan Rachel Wood and T. V. Carpio	5:19
12.	"Flying"	The Secret Machines	3:57
13.	"Blue Jay Way"	The Secret Machines	4:42
Total length:			41:08

Disc 2
No.	Title	Performer(s)	Length
14.	"I Am the Walrus"	Bono and Secret Machines	4:47
15.	"Being for the Benefit of Mr. Kite"	Eddie Izzard	2:43
16.	"Because"	Dana Fuchs, Evan Wood, Jim Sturgess, Joe Anderson, Martin Luther McCoy and T. V. Carpio	2:32
17.	"Something"	Jim Sturgess	3:02
18.	"Oh! Darling"	Dana Fuchs and Martin Luther McCoy	2:30
19.	"Strawberry Fields Forever"	Jim Sturgess and Joe Anderson	3:39
20.	"Revolution"	Jim Sturgess	2:18
21.	"While My Guitar Gently Weeps"	Martin Luther McCoy	4:02
22.	"Across the Universe"	Jim Sturgess	3:29
23.	"Helter Skelter"	Dana Fuchs	3:42
24.	"Happiness is a Warm Gun"	Joe Anderson	3:10
25.	"Blackbird"	Evan Rachel Wood	3:06
26.	"Hey Jude"	Joe Anderson	4:12
27.	"Don't Let Me Down"	Dana Fuchs	3:08
28.	"All You Need is Love"	Dana Fuchs and Jim Sturgess	3:22
29.	"Lucy in the Sky with Diamonds"	Bono	4:24
Total length:			54:06

==== Digital formats ====
No.	Title	Performer(s)	Length
10.	"Why Don't We Do It in the Road?"	Dana Fuchs	1:19
12.	"I Want You (She's So Heavy)"	Joe Anderson, Dana Fuchs and T. V. Carpio	3:42
Total length:			5:01

== Charts ==
=== Weekly charts ===
Weekly chart for Across the Universe soundtrack
Chart (2007–2008)	Peak position
Norwegian Albums (VG-lista)	31
US Billboard 200	36
US Top Soundtracks (Billboard)	12

=== Year-end charts ===
Year-end chart for Across the Universe soundtrack
Chart (2007–2008)	Position
US Soundtrack Albums (Billboard)	22

Year-end chart for Across the Universe soundtrack (Deluxe edition)
Chart (2007–2008)	Position
US Billboard 200	98
US Soundtrack Albums (Billboard)	11
Chart (2009)	Position
US Soundtrack Albums (Billboard)	19

== Certifications ==
Certifications
Region	Certification	Certified units/sales
United States (RIAA)	Platinum	1,000,000^{^}
^{^} Shipments figures based on certification alone.

== See also ==
- Outline of the Beatles
- The Beatles timeline
