= Sgt. Pepper's Lonely Hearts Club Band on the Road =

1974 off-Broadway musical directed by Tom O'Horgan

- Poster
- Music: John Lennon; Paul McCartney; George Harrison; Ringo Starr
- Book: Robin Wagner; Tom O'Horgan
- Productions: 1974 Beacon Theatre

Sgt. Pepper's Lonely Hearts Club Band on the Road was a 1974 off-Broadway production directed by Tom O'Horgan. It opened at the Beacon Theatre in New York on November 17, 1974 and ran for a total of 66 performances.

The plot tells of a Candide-like rock music singer, Billy Shears, who marries Strawberry Fields. Billy loses her to death, and his own integrity to Maxwell's Silver Hammermen, Jack, Sledge and Claw, dressed in chain mail and representing the Hells Angels of the commercial music business. Billy's bête noire is a temptress named Lucy.

Among the original cast were Ted Neeley as Billy Shears and Alaina Reed as Lucy. David Patrick Kelly played Sgt. Pepper.

The musical would later be loosely adapted into the Sgt. Pepper's Lonely Hearts Club Band film.

John Lennon attended several rehearsals and the Opening Night performance with May Pang. It was caught on film in the original promo video for "Whatever Gets You Through the Night". Lennon can also be seen pointing to a New York theater as well as a poster for the film inside the theater in a comedic fashion for the music video for "Mind Games".

== Musical Numbers ==
Act One

- "Sgt. Pepper's Lonely Hearts Club Band"
- "With a Little Help from My Friends"
- "Nowhere Man"
- "With a Little Help from My Friends" (Reprise)
- "Lucy in the Sky with Diamonds"
- "I Want You (She's So Heavy)"
- "Come Together"
- "Nowhere Man" (Reprise)
- "Sun Queen"
- "Lovely Rita"
- "Polythene Pam"
- "She Came In Through the Bathroom Window"
- "You Never Give Me Your Money"
- "Lovely Rita" (Reprise)
- "Her Majesty"
- "A Day in the Life"
- "She's Leaving Home"
- "Strawberry Fields Forever"
- "Getting Better"

Act Two

- "Because"
- "When I'm Sixty-Four"
- "Because" (Reprise)
- "Good Morning Good Morning"
- "Being for the Benefit of Mr. Kite!"
- "Oh! Darling"
- "Fixing a Hole"
- "Oh! Darling" (Reprise)
- "Being for the Benefit of Mr. Kite!" (Reprise)
- "Mean Mr. Mustard"
- "Maxwell's Silver Hammer"
- "Being for the Benefit of Mr. Kite!" (2nd Reprise)
- "Carry That Weight"
- "Golden Slumbers"
- "Carry That Weight" (Reprise)
- "The Long and Winding Road"
- "Get Back"
- "Sgt. Pepper's Lonely Hearts Club Band (Reprise)"
- "The End"

== Credits ==
Produced by Robert Stigwood, in association with Brian Avnet and Scarab Productions, Inc.
Executive Producer, Peter Brown
Associate Producers: Gatchell and Neufeld, Steven Singer, Steven Metz and Howard Dando

Music and Lyrics by John Lennon, Paul McCartney, George Harrison and Ringo Starr
Directed by Tom O’Horgan
Scenic Design by Robin Wagner
Lighting Design by Jules Fisher
Costume Design by Randy Barceló
Sound Design by Abe Jacob
Music Arranged and conducted by Gordon Lowry Harrell

Production Supervisor: Richard Scanga

Opening Night Cast:
Ted Neeley - Billy Shears
Allan Nicholls - Jack Hammer
Kay Cole - Strawberry fields
B.G. Gibson - Claw Hammer
William Parry - Sledge Hammer
Alaina Reed - Lucy

Hammeroids:

- Blake Anderson
- Arlana Blue
- Ron Capossoli
- Stoney Reece
- Jason Roberts

Understudies:

- Billy – David Patrick Kelley
- Strawberry & Lucy – Stoney Reece
- Sgt. Pepper, Polythene Pam – Michael Meadows
