= Sgt. Pepper's Lonely Hearts Club Band (film) =

1978 film by Michael Schultz

- Theatrical release poster
- Directed by: Michael Schultz
- Written by: Henry Edwards
- Based on: Sgt. Pepper's Lonely Hearts Club Band by The Beatles
- Produced by: Robert Stigwood
- Starring: Peter Frampton; The Bee Gees; Frankie Howerd; Paul Nicholas; Donald Pleasence; Sandy Farina; Dianne Steinberg; Steve Martin; Aerosmith; Alice Cooper; Earth, Wind & Fire; Billy Preston; George Burns; Carel Struycken
- Narrated by: George Burns
- Cinematography: Owen Roizman
- Edited by: Christopher Holmes
- Music by: John Lennon; Paul McCartney; George Harrison; Ringo Starr
- Production company: Robert Stigwood Organization
- Distributed by: Universal Pictures (United States); Paramount Pictures (through Cinema International Corporation; international); N.F. Geria II FilmgeseIIschaft mbH
- Release date: July 21, 1978
- Running time: 111 minutes
- Country: United States
- Language: English
- Budget: $13 million
- Box office: $20.4 million

Sgt. Pepper's Lonely Hearts Club Band is a 1978 American jukebox musical comedy film directed by Michael Schultz, written by Henry Edwards and starring an ensemble cast led by Peter Frampton and the Bee Gees. Depicting the loosely constructed story of a band as they wrangle with the music industry and battle evil forces bent on stealing their instruments and corrupting their hometown of Heartland, the film is presented in a form similar to that of a rock opera, with the songs providing "dialogue" to carry the story. George Burns has most of the spoken lines that act to clarify the plot and provide further narration.

The film's soundtrack, released as an accompanying double album, features new versions of songs originally written and performed by the Beatles. The film draws primarily from two of the band's albums, 1967's Sgt. Pepper's Lonely Hearts Club Band and 1969's Abbey Road, with additional selections from other Beatles albums.

The production was loosely adapted from Sgt. Pepper's Lonely Hearts Club Band on the Road, a 1974 off-Broadway production directed by Tom O'Horgan. The film was met with minor box office success, grossing $20.4 million against a budget of $13 million, but overwhelmingly negative reviews from critics for its weak plot, poor acting and disjointed musical interpretations. However, some of the musical numbers, particularly Earth, Wind & Fire's cover of "Got to Get You Into My Life" and Aerosmith's cover of "Come Together", were met with high praise, the former earning Earth, Wind & Fire a Grammy, and the latter being a top-25 hit single.

== Overview ==
The film was produced by Robert Stigwood, founder of RSO Records, who had earlier produced Saturday Night Fever. RSO Records also released the soundtrack to the film Grease in 1978, which had Barry Gibb producing and Peter Frampton playing lead guitar on the title track. In 1976, the Bee Gees had recorded three Beatles cover songs, "Golden Slumbers / Carry That Weight", "She Came In Through the Bathroom Window" and "Sun King", for the musical documentary All This and World War II.

The Beatles' former producer, George Martin, served as musical director, conductor, arranger and producer of the film's soundtrack album.

Before the film's release, Robin Gibb of the Bee Gees announced:

Kids today don't know the Beatles' Sgt. Pepper. And when those who do see our film and hear us doing it, that will be the version they relate to and remember. Unfortunately, the Beatles will be secondary. You see, there is no such thing as the Beatles. They don't exist as a band and never performed Sgt. Pepper live, in any case. When ours comes out, it will be, in effect, as if theirs never existed. When you heard the Beatles do 'Long Tall Sally' or 'Roll Over Beethoven,' did you care about Little Richard's or Chuck Berry's version?

== Plot ==
Mr. Kite, elderly mayor of the small town of Heartland, recounts the history of Heartland's celebrated marching band, Sgt. Pepper and his Lonely Hearts Club Band. On August 10, 1958, Sgt. Pepper died of a heart attack at the unveiling of a new weather vane in his likeness. Sgt. Pepper left the band's magical musical instruments to the town; so long as they remain in Heartland, its people will live happily ever after. He also left his musical legacy to his grandson, Billy Shears. Billy forms a new Lonely Hearts Club Band with his three best friends. Billy's charming but avaricious half-brother, Dougie, serves as the band's manager for ("Sgt. Pepper's Lonely Hearts Club Band").

Heartland loves the new band ("With a Little Help from My Friends"), and soon Big Deal Records president B.D. Hoffler invites them to Hollywood with the promise of a record deal ("Fixing a Hole"), which the band accepts ("Getting Better"). Billy bids farewell to his sweet hometown girlfriend, Strawberry Fields ("Here Comes the Sun"). Once in Hollywood, B.D. introduces the band to their new labelmates, sexy singers Lucy and the Diamonds, and they negotiate the contract over a sex-and-drug-fueled dinner ("I Want You (She's So Heavy)"). Hitting it off with Lucy, Billy all but forgets about Strawberry. The band quickly succeeds ("Good Morning, Good Morning"), with hit records and sold-out concerts produced and performed as quickly as they succeeded ("Nowhere Man"/"Polythene Pam"/"She Came In Through the Bathroom Window"/"Sgt. Pepper's Lonely Hearts Club Band (Reprise)").

Meanwhile, villainous Mr. Mustard and his henchman, the Brute, drive to Heartland in their computer- and robot-equipped van, under orders from the mysterious FVB to steal the magical instruments from City Hall and distribute them among FVB and its affiliates ("Mean Mr. Mustard"). Without the instruments, Heartland quickly degenerates into a hotbed of vice and urban decay. Strawberry takes an early morning bus to Hollywood ("She's Leaving Home") to warn the band ("Lucy in the Sky with Diamonds"/"Oh! Darling"). Mustard, who has a crush on Strawberry, follows. In Hollywood, the band and Strawberry steal Mustard's van and use its computer to locate the stolen instruments, recovering the cornet from the deranged, money-driven anti-aging specialist Dr. Maxwell Edison ("Maxwell's Silver Hammer"), and the tuba from mind-controlling cult leader Father Sun ("Because"). Billy is knocked out in each battle, with nothing except Strawberry's love keeping him going ("Strawberry Fields Forever"). The group easily find the bass drum, which Mr. Mustard kept for himself in the van. However, the computer and robots malfunction and self-destruct before they can locate the final missing instrument, the saxophone.

As Heartland deteriorates further, Dougie and Billy and the Hendersons convince B.D. to organize a benefit concert which will save the town ("Being for the Benefit of Mr. Kite!"). Dougie and Lucy, who have bonded over their shared love of money, plot to run off with the show's proceeds ("You Never Give Me Your Money") while Billy, Strawberry, and the Hendersons are watching Earth, Wind & Fire perform at the benefit ("Got to Get You into My Life"). Mustard and the Brute suddenly arrive and take back the van, containing the recovered instruments and the benefit money, and also kidnap Strawberry ("When I'm Sixty-Four"). Billy and the Hendersons see the van leave and pursue it in the town's hot air balloon.

Mustard drives to FVB's headquarters, where the Future Villain Band plans to take over the world. To turn Strawberry into a "mindless groupie", FVB chains her up onstage while the band plays ("Come Together") and the lead singer fondles her. Billy and the Hendersons arrive and engage FVB in hand-to-hand combat. The singer is thrown off the stage to his death, but so is Strawberry.

The town of Heartland, now cleaned up and the instruments returned, holds an elaborate funeral for Strawberry ("Golden Slumbers"/"Carry That Weight"). The depressed Billy attempts to get Strawberry off his mind ("The Long and Winding Road"); when he cannot, the Hendersons worry for him ("A Day in the Life"). Billy finally attempts suicide by jumping from a rooftop. Before he can hit the ground, in a form of Deus ex machina, the Sgt. Pepper weather vane atop City Hall comes to life. Wielding magical lightning bolts, the weather vane catches Billy and reverses his suicide attempt, then dances through the town square ("Get Back"), transforming Mustard and the Brute into a bishop and a monk, Mustard's van into a Volkswagen Beetle, and Dougie and Lucy into a priest and nun. The weather vane restores Strawberry to life and transforms the Hendersons' mourning suits into shiny new uniforms.

In the finale, the cast appears with numerous celebrities in a tribute to the original Beatles album cover ("Sgt. Pepper's Lonely Hearts Club Band (Finale)").

== Featured performers ==
- Peter Frampton, whose album Frampton Comes Alive! was the biggest-selling live album ever at the time, plays Billy Shears, loosely based on Paul McCartney, leader of the re-formed band and grandson of the original Sgt. Pepper character.
- The Bee Gees (Barry, Robin, and Maurice Gibb) whose music had been integral to Saturday Night Fever (released by this film's international distributor, Paramount Pictures), play Mark, David and Bob Henderson, respectively based on John Lennon, George Harrison, and Ringo Starr, members of the re-formed Sgt. Pepper's Lonely Hearts Club Band. They also provide the computerized voices for Mean Mr. Mustard's robots.
- Steve Martin, whose comedy album A Wild and Crazy Guy was released the same year as the film, reaching number two on the music-dominated Billboard 200 album charts, plays Dr. Maxwell Edison.

The cast also featured

- Frankie Howerd as Mean Mr. Mustard
- Paul Nicholas as Dougie Shears
- Donald Pleasence as B.D., referred to as B.D. Hoffler in Burns' narrative voice-over and on a magazine cover in the film, but officially known in the film's credits, publicity materials, and in-film posters as B.D. Brockhurst
- Sandy Farina as Strawberry Fields
- Dianne Steinberg as Lucy
- Aerosmith as Future Villain Band (FVB)
- Alice Cooper as Father Sun
- Earth, Wind & Fire, appearing as Earth, Wind, and Fire, the elements.
- Billy Preston as the magical Sgt. Pepper golden weather vane come to life.
- George Burns as Mr. Kite, the elderly mayor of Heartland.
- Stargard. as the Diamonds
- Anna Rodzianko and Rose Aragon as The Computerettes
- Carel Struycken as The Brute, in his first film appearance
- Patti Jerome as Saralinda Shears
- Max Showalter as Ernest Shears
- John Wheeler as Mr. Fields
- Jay W. MacIntosh as Ms. Fields
- Eleanor Zee as Mrs. Henderson
- Patrick Cranshaw as Western Union Manager
- Teri Lynn Wood as Bonnie
- Tracy Justrich as Tippy

=== Special guests ===
In the last scene, the cast is joined by "Our Guests at Heartland" to sing the reprise of the title track while standing in a formation imitating the Beatles' Sgt. Pepper album cover. The scene was filmed at Metro-Goldwyn-Mayer Studios on December 16, 1977.

The guests were

- Peter Allen
- Keith Allison
- George Benson
- Elvin Bishop
- Stephen Bishop
- Jack Bruce
- Keith Carradine
- Carol Channing
- "Charlotte, Sharon, and Ula"
- Jim Dandy
- Sarah Dash
- Rick Derringer
- Barbara Dickson
- Donovan
- Dr. John
- Randy Edelman
- Yvonne Elliman
- José Feliciano
- Leif Garrett
- Adrian Gurvitz
- Billy Harper
- Eddie Harris
- Heart
- Nona Hendryx
- Barry Humphries as Dame Edna Everage
- Etta James
- Bruce Johnston
- Joe Lala
- D.C. LaRue
- Jo Leb
- Marcy Levy
- Mark Lindsay
- Nils Lofgren
- John Mayall
- Curtis Mayfield
- Bruce Morrow (Cousin Brucie)
- Peter Noone
- Alan O'Day
- Lee Oskar
- The Paley Brothers
- Robert Palmer
- Wilson Pickett
- Anita Pointer
- Bonnie Raitt
- Helen Reddy
- Minnie Riperton
- Chita Rivera
- Johnny Rivers
- Monte Rock III
- Danielle Rowe
- Seals & Crofts
- Sha-Na-Na
- Del Shannon
- Joe Simon
- Connie Stevens
- Al Stewart
- John Stewart
- Tina Turner
- Frankie Valli
- Gwen Verdon
- Diane Vincent
- Grover Washington, Jr.
- Alan White
- Lenny White
- Jackie Lomax
- Margaret Whiting
- Hank Williams, Jr.
- Johnny Winter
- Wolfman Jack
- Bobby Womack
- Gary Wright

== Production ==
The film began as a 1974 live Broadway show called Sgt. Pepper's Lonely Hearts Club Band on the Road, which was produced by The Robert Stigwood Organization. Stigwood had purchased the rights to use 29 Beatles songs for the play and was determined to do something with them, so he brought the songs to Henry Edwards to write a script. Edwards had never written a script for a film, but had impressed Stigwood with musical analysis he'd written for The New York Times. "I spread the songs out on my apartment floor and went to work", said Edwards. "Mr Stigwood wanted a concept. I told him I'd like to do a big MGM-like musical. We'd synthesize forms and end up with an MGM musical but with the music of today."

With a script in place, the cast was assembled. In the spring of 1977, Frampton, The Bee Gees, and Martin met to begin work on the soundtrack. Filming started in October 1977 on the backlot of MGM Studios in Culver City, where the set of Heartland, USA was built. Interiors were filmed at Universal City Studios.

== Reception ==
Nobody realized what a stinker it was and as soon as they were in the middle of it, everybody says, "You know what, this is absolutely blasphemous to the Beatles."

— Alice Cooper

Although Universal had high hopes for the movie – anticipating "this generation's Gone with the Wind " – it worked out differently. According to film historian Leonard Maltin's TV, Movie & Video Guide, the picture "just doesn't work" and "ranges from tolerable to embarrassing. As for the Bee Gees' acting, well, if you can't say something nice..." On Rotten Tomatoes, the film has a 11% score based on 27 reviews with an average rating of 3.9/10. The site's critical consensus reads "I thought you might like to know that the Beatles (aka the act you've known for all these years) are ill-served by this kitschy, aggressively whimsical fantasy film that's most certainly not a thrill". Metacritic, which uses a weighted average, assigned the film a score of 27 out of 100, based on 9 critics, indicating "generally unfavorable" reviews.

In Rolling Stone, Paul Nelson ridiculed virtually every aspect of the production. He said that Frampton had "absolutely no future in Hollywood" while Schultz "would seem to need direction merely to find the set, let alone the camera". Nelson commented on the musical soundtrack: "The album proves conclusively that you can't go home again in 1978. Or, if you do, you'd better be aware of who's taken over the neighborhood." The New York Times's Janet Maslin wrote that the "musical numbers are strung together so mindlessly that the movie has the feel of an interminable variety show", also adding that "conceived in a spirit of merriment...watching it feels like playing shuffleboard at the absolute insistence of a bossy shipboard social director. When whimsy gets to be this overbearing, it simply isn't whimsy any more." Similarly, David Ansen of Newsweek dismissed Sgt. Pepper as "a film with a dangerous resemblance to wallpaper".

A more positive review came from The Valley Independent, whose Ron Paglia called the film "Good, campy fun", citing Steve Martin's performance as "a high point" and the celebrity-filled finale as "something special" before concluding "there's much to enjoy." The Intelligencer's Lou Gaul described the production as "A sort of modern Fantasia for today's teens".

The film was ranked No. 76 on VH1's 100 Most Shocking Moments in Rock and Roll.

=== Band response ===
Only Paul McCartney and Ringo Starr went to see the movie when it first premiered. When asked about the film in a 1979 interview, George Harrison expressed his sympathy for Stigwood, Frampton and the Bee Gees, acknowledging that they had all worked hard to achieve success before making Sgt. Pepper. He said of Frampton and the Bee Gees: "I think it's damaged their images, their careers, and they didn't need to do that. It's just like the Beatles trying to do the Rolling Stones. The Rolling Stones can do it better." While John Lennon never publicly acknowledged the film he did attend rehearsals for the play.

=== Nominations ===
At the 1978 Stinkers Bad Movie Awards, the film received a nomination for Worst Picture. When the ballot was revised in 2003, it kept that nomination while also receiving nominations for Worst Supporting Actress (Dianne Steinberg, who played Lucy in the film) and Worst On-Screen Group (Lucy and the Diamonds).

=== Box office ===
The film was a minor commercial success, earning $20.4 million against the production budget of $13 million.

== See also ==
- All This and World War II, a 1976 musical documentary that also used the concept of using covers of Beatles songs to tell a story.
- Across the Universe, a 2007 musical film that also used the concept of using Beatles songs to tell a story.
- List of cover versions of Beatles songs
