= Across the Universe (disambiguation) =

"Across the Universe" is a 1969 song by the Beatles.

Across the Universe may also refer to:

- Across the Universe (album), a 1990 rock album by Trip Shakespeare
- Across the Universe (EP), a 2020 EP by D-Crunch
- Across the Universe (film), a 2007 musical film based on songs by the Beatles
  - Across the Universe (soundtrack), the soundtrack of the film
- Across the Universe (novel series), a series of novels by Beth Revis
- Across the Universe (Sargent and Zebrowski novel), a 1999 Star Trek novel
- "Across the Universe" (Holly Johnson song), 1991
- Across the Universe (message), an interstellar radio message
- Across the Universe, an album by Al Di Meola
- "Across the Universe" (TMNT 2003), an episode of Teenage Mutant Ninja Turtles (2003 TV series)

== See also ==
- A Cross the Universe (disambiguation)
