= Dana Fuchs =

American singer and songwriter (born 1976)

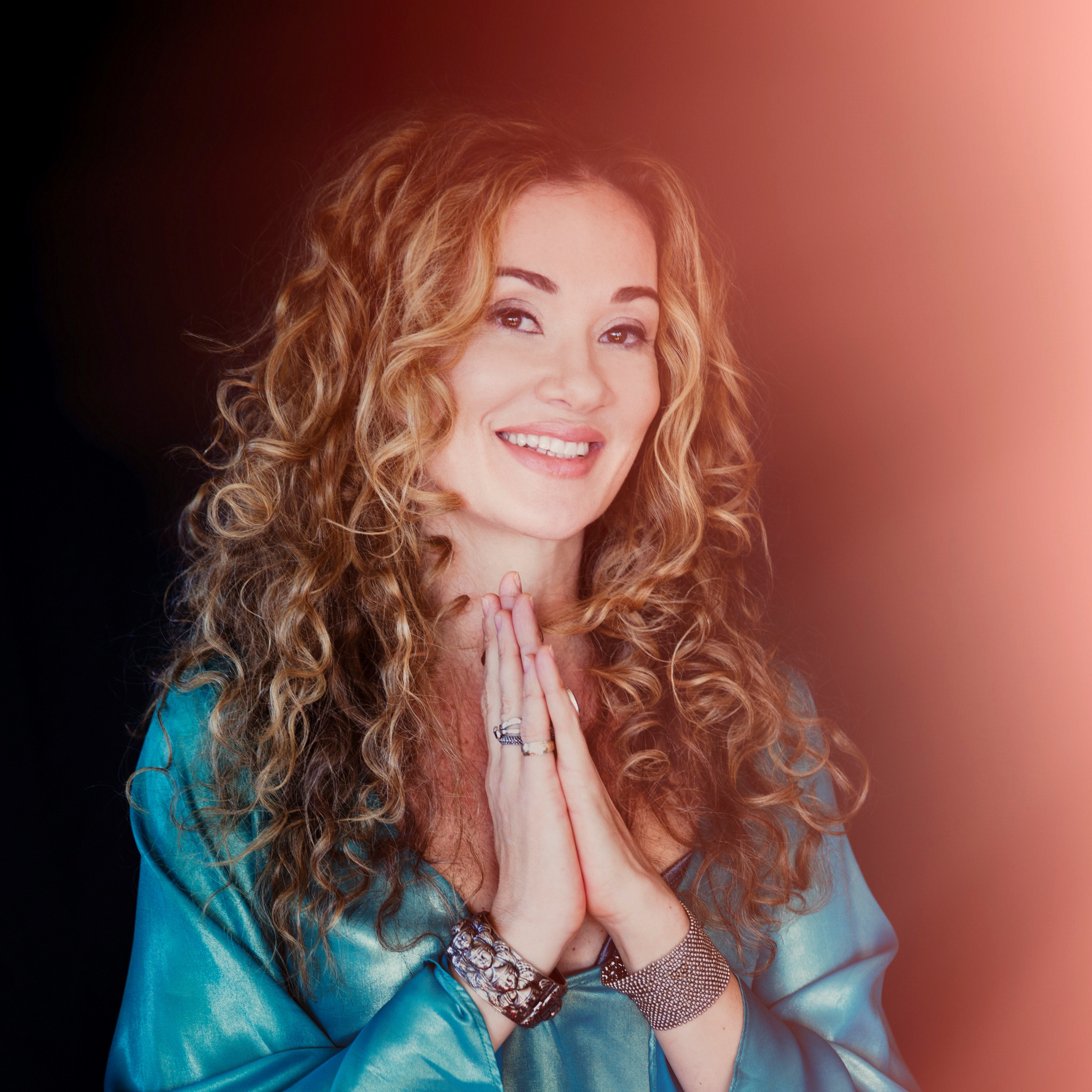

Background information
- Born: January 10, 1976 (age 50); New Jersey, U.S.
- Genres: Blues rock, blues
- Occupations: Singer, songwriter
- Labels: Ruf; Get Along Records
- Website: www.danafuchs.com

Dana Fuchs (pronounced Fyooks, born January 10, 1976) is an American singer and songwriter known for a mix of Southern rock, soul, roots, and blues. She played Sadie in the film Across the Universe, her performance described by The New York Times as "triumphal".

== Early life ==
The youngest of six children, Fuchs was born in New Jersey and raised in the small rural town of Wildwood, Florida. When she was twelve, she sang in the First Baptist Gospel Choir. Her father was an alcoholic and her grandfather died by suicide, which was the start of a series of family tragedies. In her teens she performed in drama class and in a guitar group. She began using illegal drugs, dropped out of school, left home, and worked as a stripper. After moving to New York City, she took a job as a legal secretary before returning to stripping. She entered psychotherapy and group meetings to begin to deal with her struggles. Soon after, her sister, an alcoholic and drug addict, died by suicide and her oldest brother died from brain cancer.

Her experience with death and loss became a theme in her music.

== Career ==
In 1998, Fuchs began to concentrate on singing and songwriting influenced by her love for Esther Phillips and Etta James. She performed in blues clubs, and after meeting Jon Diamond, they formed the Dana Fuchs Band and released the album Lonely for a Lifetime (2003). Her raspy voice invited comparisons to rock singer Janis Joplin, and she acted as the singer in Love, Janis, an Off-Broadway musical about Joplin that ran from 2001 to 2003. When director Julie Taymor wanted to make a movie about someone with a voice similar to Joplin's, she hired Fuchs for Across the Universe (2007). The movie was nominated for Best Picture at the Golden Globe Awards.

Fuchs' albums Bliss Avenue (2013) and Songs from the Road (2014) reached the Top 10 of the Blues Album Chart of Billboard magazine.

With Jack Livesey, Fuchs wrote and performed songs on the soundtrack for the Big Beach production of Laurie Collyer's independent film Sherrybaby, including the opening and closing title songs. She also worked for MTV during the 1990s and 2000s as the voice of many of its on-air promos.

After fulfilling her contractual obligation with Ruf Records, Fuchs started her own label called Get Along Records. With a successful crowd funding campaign on PledgeMusic, she financed the recording and released her May 2018 album, Love Lives On on the label. The album was recorded in Memphis and produced by Kevin Houston with songs co-written with guitarist and band member Diamond.

== Charitable works ==
Fuchs is an ambassador for The Jed Foundation (JED), an organization that tries to prevent suicide and help teens with their emotional health.

== Discography ==
| Year | Album | Producer | Label | Notes |
|---|---|---|---|---|
| 2003 | Lonely for a Lifetime | Kenny Aaronson, Jon Diamond and Dana Fuchs | Q&W Music | |
| 2006 | Sherrybaby Soundtrack | Jack Livesey | Lakeshore Records | "Some Kind of Heaven" "When I Find My Life" "Anything At All" "I Lay Me Down" |
| 2007 | Live in NYC | Kevin Mackall, Peter Moshay and Jon Diamond | Antler King Records / Audio & Video Labs, Inc. / Pepper / AKR | |
| 2007 | Across the Universe Soundtrack | T-Bone Burnett, Elliot Goldenthal and Teese Gohl | Interscope Records | "Why Don't We Do It in the Road?" "I Want You (She's So Heavy)" with Joe Anderson, Dana Fuchs, Teresa Victoria Carpio "Dear Prudence" with Joe Anderson, Dana Fuchs, Jim Sturgess, Evan Rachel Wood, Teresa Victoria Carpio "Because" with Joe Anderson, Teresa Victoria Carpio, Dana Fuchs, Martin Luther McCoy, Jim Sturgess, Evan Rachel Wood "Helter Skelter" "Don't Let Me Down" with Dana Fuchs, Martin Luther McCoy "All You Need Is Love" with Teresa Victoria Carpio, Dana Fuchs, Martin Luther McCoy, Jim Sturgess |
| 2011 | Love to Beg | Jon Diamond and Dana Fuchs | Ruf Records #1167 | |
| 2013 | Bliss Avenue | Jon Diamond and Dana Fuchs | Ruf Records #1191 | |
| 2014 | Songs from the Road | Kevin Mackall and Thomas Ruf | Ruf Records #1207 | |
| 2015 | Broken Down Acoustic Sessions | Jon Diamond and Dana Fuchs | Get Along Records | |
| 2018 | Love Lives On | Kevin Houston, Dana Fuchs and Jon Diamond | Get Along Records #3441 | |
| 2022 | Borrowed Time | Kevin Mackall and Thomas Ruf | Ruf Records #1295 | |
