= Across the Universe (film) =

2007 film by Julie Taymor

- Theatrical release poster
- Directed by: Julie Taymor
- Screenplay by: Dick Clement; Ian La Frenais
- Story by: Dick Clement; Ian La Frenais; Julie Taymor
- Produced by: Matthew Gross; Jennifer Todd; Suzanne Todd
- Starring: Jim Sturgess; Evan Rachel Wood; Joe Anderson
- Cinematography: Bruno Delbonnel
- Edited by: Françoise Bonnot
- Music by: The Beatles (songs); Elliot Goldenthal (score)
- Production companies: Columbia Pictures; Revolution Studios; Gross Entertainment; Team Todd
- Distributed by: Sony Pictures Releasing
- Release dates: September 14, 2007 (TIFF); October 12, 2007 (United States)
- Running time: 133 minutes
- Countries: United States; United Kingdom
- Language: English
- Budget: $70.8 million
- Box office: $29.6 million

Across the Universe is a 2007 jukebox musical romantic drama film directed by Julie Taymor. Thirty-four Beatles songs propel the narrative of a script based on an original story credited to Taymor, Dick Clement, and Ian La Frenais. The title derives from the song of the same name by John Lennon. The film stars Jim Sturgess, Evan Rachel Wood, Joe Anderson and T. V. Carpio, and introduces Dana Fuchs and Martin Luther McCoy as actors. Bono, Eddie Izzard, Joe Cocker, and Salma Hayek make cameo appearances.

Across the Universe premiered at the Toronto International Film Festival on September 14, 2007, and was theatrically released in the United States on October 12 by Columbia Pictures. The film received mixed critical reviews. The visuals, cast, and singing performances were praised, while the plot and direction met with criticism. The film was a box-office bomb, failing to earn even half of its production budget. Nonetheless, the film received a Golden Globe nomination for Best Motion Picture – Musical or Comedy and an Oscar nomination for Best Costume Design. Two supporting cast members, Carol Woods and Timothy T. Mitchum, performed as part of a special Beatles tribute at the 50th Grammy Awards.

== Plot ==
In the 1960s, Jude Feeney, a young shipyard worker in Liverpool, heads to the US to find his G.I. father who conceived him during World War II, but whom he has never met. He promises his girlfriend Molly that he will stay in touch while he is away.

Meanwhile, in New Jersey, Lucy Carrigan worries about her boyfriend Daniel, who is headed for service in the Vietnam War. In Dayton, Ohio, cheerleader Prudence pines for another member of her all-female cheerleader squad in high school; Prudence drops out of school in shame.

Jude meets his father, Wes, a janitor at Princeton University. The son does not bond with father as Jude just wanted to let him know that he exists, but Wes assures him he would have been there for him if he had known about him.

While on the Princeton campus, Jude meets and befriends slacker student Max, who brings him home for Thanksgiving. Max introduces Jude to his family, including his younger sister, Lucy. Max drops out of college. He and Jude move into a bohemian enclave in Greenwich Village run by a singer, Sadie. Jude becomes a freelance artist, while Max drives a cab. Daniel is killed in Vietnam; Lucy attends his funeral.

In Detroit, a young African-American boy is killed in the 1967 riot. His adult brother Jo-Jo, a guitarist, moves to New York for a change of scenery and auditions for Sadie's band. They are soon joined by Prudence, who has hitchhiked to New York.

Lucy visits Max in New York before she starts college. She and Jude fall in love. Max, initially displeased that they had sex, gives them his blessing when he realizes that Jude is in love with Lucy. Later, Max is drafted into the army and sent to Vietnam. Prudence is attracted to Sadie and becomes depressed when Sadie and Jo-Jo begin a relationship.

Lucy becomes involved in the anti-war movement. Jude remains comparatively apolitical but devoted to Lucy. Sadie is offered a chance to go on a solo tour as a headliner, leading to a bitter breakup with Jo-Jo and her original band.

Jude dislikes the increasing amount of time Lucy spends with the Students for a Democratic Republic, led by activist Paco, as he suspects that Paco is attempting to seduce Lucy. Jude storms into the SDR office, leading to an argument with Lucy and a fight with Paco, after which Jude is thrown out. Lucy breaks up with Jude. Some time later, Jude follows her to an anti-war demonstration at Columbia University. When the police arrest Lucy, Paco, and other activists, Jude's attempts to reach her leads to his arrest as well.

With Jude facing deportation, Lucy contacts Jude's father, who then visits Jude in jail, but he has no legal proof that Jude is his son and thus a US citizen. Jude is sent back to England. Returning to his job at the Liverpool shipyards, he runs into his former girlfriend Molly and sees that she is heavily pregnant by her current partner, who is also Jude's co-worker and former best friend. Molly began dating him around the time Jude stopped writing to her (and when he started seeing Lucy). Jude and the couple part on good terms.

Jo-Jo continues playing solo guitar in bars, while the highly successful Sadie drowns her sorrow and loneliness in alcohol, lamenting that her band doesn't play with the soul and emotion that Jo-Jo and her old band did. Max is wounded in Vietnam and is sent home. Lucy visits him in the hospital, but he is traumatized and dependent on morphine. Meanwhile, she continues her activities with the SDR and is involved with Paco, but is uncomfortable with him leading the movement deeper into violence.

Lucy leaves Paco and the organization when she finds him making bombs. She is surrounded by constant reminders of Jude. One of Paco's homemade bombs explodes, killing him and his confederates. Upon reading this news, Jude fears Lucy is also dead. He learns from Max over the phone that she had left the group beforehand and is alive, and he arranges to return to New York.

Jo-Jo and Sadie, who have reconciled and put their old band back together (including Prudence on keyboards), put on a rooftop concert. Max brings Jude to the rooftop. When the police arrive to break up the concert, Jude manages to remain on the roof and begins to sing. The police allow the band to rejoin him. He notices Lucy on the opposite rooftop, standing and looking at him. Lucy and Jude smile at each other as the performance concludes.

== Cast ==
The names of the six main characters (and most minor characters) were inspired by Beatles song titles and lyrics.

- Jim Sturgess as Jude ("Hey Jude")
- Evan Rachel Wood as Lucy ("Lucy in the Sky with Diamonds")
- Joe Anderson as Max ("Maxwell's Silver Hammer")
- Dana Fuchs as Sadie ("Sexy Sadie")
- Martin Luther McCoy as Joe "Jo-Jo" ("Get Back")
- T.V. Carpio as Prudence ("Dear Prudence")
- Spencer Liff as Daniel, Lucy's high school boyfriend ("Rocky Raccoon")
- Lisa Hogg as Molly, Jude's Liverpool girlfriend ("Ob-La-Di, Ob-La-Da")
- Angela Mounsey as Martha Feeny, Jude's mother ("Martha My Dear")
- Robert Clohessy as Wesley "Wes" Hubert, Jude's father
- Dylan Baker and Linda Emond as Lucy's parents (the Carrigans, Jerry Carrigan opened the Beatles' first performance in America)
- Lynn Cohen as Grandmother Carrigan
- Bill Irwin as Uncle Teddy ("Teddy Boy")
- Timothy T. Mitchum as Jo-Jo's Younger Brother
- Carol Woods as Gospel Singer At The Brother's Funeral ("Let It Be")
- Joe Cocker as Bum / Pimp / Mad Hippie
- Jacob Pitts as Rat Magazine Employee
- Staceyann Chin as Rat Magazine Employee
- Harry Lennix as Army Sergeant
- Logan Marshall-Green as Paco
- James Urbaniak as Bill, Sadie's manager ("The Continuing Story of Bungalow Bill")
- Ching Valdes-Aran as Luna Park
- Bono as Dr. Robert ("Doctor Robert")
- Daniel Ezralow as Mother Superior ("Happiness Is a Warm Gun")
- Eddie Izzard as Mr. Kite ("Being for the Benefit of Mr. Kite!")
- Arabella Holzbog as "Prankster"
- Charlie Griffiths as Judes Neighbour in ("Hey Jude")
- Ekaterina Sknarina as Rita, Prudence's girlfriend, a contortionist for Mr. Kite's circus. ("Lovely Rita")
- Salma Hayek as Bang Bang Shoot Shoot Nurses ("Happiness Is a Warm Gun")

== Music ==
=== Musical numbers ===
List of 33 Beatles compositions on the soundtrack in order, including three compositions heard twice, totalling 34 individual music cues:

1. "Girl" — Jude
2. "Helter Skelter" — Sadie
3. "Hold Me Tight" — Lucy, Molly, and Prom Night singers
4. "All My Loving" — Jude
5. "I Want to Hold Your Hand" — Prudence
6. "With a Little Help from My Friends" — Max, Jude, and Dorm buddies
7. "It Won't Be Long" — Lucy and Students
8. "I've Just Seen a Face" — Jude
9. "Let It Be" — Gospel singer, Jojo's brother, and Church choir
10. "Come Together" — Pimp, Bum, Mad Hippie, Jojo, and Prostitutes
11. "Why Don't We Do It in the Road?" — Sadie
12. "If I Fell" — Lucy
13. "I Want You (She's So Heavy)" — Max, Sadie, Prudence, Uncle Sam, and Soldiers
14. "Dear Prudence" — Sadie, Jude, Lucy, and Max
15. "Flying" (instrumental) — The Secret Machines
16. "Blue Jay Way" — The Secret Machines
17. "I Am the Walrus" — Dr. Robert
18. "Being for the Benefit of Mr. Kite!" — Mr. Kite
19. "Because" — Lucy, Jude, Max, Sadie, Prudence, and Jojo
20. "Something" — Jude
21. "Oh! Darling" — Sadie and Jojo
22. "Strawberry Fields Forever" — Jude and Max
23. "Revolution" — Jude
24. "While My Guitar Gently Weeps" — Jojo and Jude
25. "Across the Universe" — Jude (interwoven with "Helter Skelter")
26. "Helter Skelter (Reprise)" — Sadie (interwoven with "Across the Universe")
27. "And I Love Her" (brief extract incorporated into the orchestral score during the "Across the Universe"/"Helter Skelter (Reprise)" sequence, also sung by McCoy in a deleted scene)
28. "Happiness Is a Warm Gun" — Max, Bang Bang Shoot Shoot nurses, and Soldiers
29. "A Day in the Life (Instrumental)" — Jeff Beck
30. "Blackbird" — Lucy
31. "Hey Jude" — Max, Jude's mother, Children and Immigrants
32. "Don't Let Me Down" — Sadie and Jojo
33. "All You Need Is Love" — Jude, Sadie, Prudence, Max, and Jojo
34. "Lucy in the Sky with Diamonds" — Bono and The Edge (end credits)

==== Extended musical numbers ====
There is extra music, such as in "Hold Me Tight", to provide more opportunity for things such as dance sequences. In "Come Together" on the special features, there is extra music for a dance solo and a well-planned "Six Degrees of Separation" which connects the main characters as they enter New York lifestyle. "I Want You (She's So Heavy)" is also extended to add time for Max's medical check-up that is shown and for the dialogue about Max eating cotton balls and other theories to get out of the draft. The extended music is used as underscoring for dialogue after "Dear Prudence", "Something", and "While My Guitar Gently Weeps". Some songs are not extended, but also have dialogue, such as "Revolution" and "All My Loving". Other extended songs include "I Am the Walrus", "Oh! Darling", "Across the Universe", and "Helter Skelter".

=== Soundtrack ===
The film's end credits identify thirty-three Beatles compositions featured in the film, either in their entirety or in part, all written between 1962 and 1969 by the members of the Beatles (John Lennon, Paul McCartney, George Harrison, and Ringo Starr) and recorded by the Beatles. Twenty-nine of them are compositions that are officially credited to the songwriting partnership of Lennon–McCartney. Three are credited to George Harrison. One title ("Flying") is a 1967 instrumental composition credited to all four members of the Beatles (Lennon–McCartney–Harrison–Starr).

Thirty of the soundtrack's songs feature vocals. Two of them ("And I Love Her" and "A Day in the Life") are brief instrumental versions of songs that were originally written with lyrics, although "And I Love Her" is sung in a deleted scene. One song ("Flying") was originally written as an instrumental.

Twenty-five of the vocal tracks are performed by one or more of the six lead cast members. Four of the songs are sung by stars with cameo roles (Bono, Eddie Izzard, Salma Hayek and Joe Cocker). One song ("Let It Be") is sung by supporting members of the cast. Another song ("Blue Jay Way") is sung by indie Texan trio the Secret Machines. In 29 of the vocal tracks, the vocalists are singing on-screen. Two of the vocal tracks ("Blue Jay Way" and "Lucy in the Sky with Diamonds") are sung by off-screen vocalists.

The remaining three of the 33 tracks are instrumentals. "Flying" is performed by the Secret Machines, "And I Love Her" is heard briefly as part of the orchestral score, and "A Day in the Life" is performed on guitar by Jeff Beck in a version recorded for Sir George Martin's 1998 album In My Life.

In addition to the Beatles compositions, the soundtrack features an original score composed by Elliot Goldenthal. Goldenthal worked on Taymor's previous films Titus and Frida. (Goldenthal and director Taymor have been romantic partners since 1982.)

Interscope Records has released three variations of the soundtrack from the film—a standard edition and two deluxe editions. The standard edition contains 16 tracks from the film soundtrack, although "Let It Be" is shortened, missing the third verse. The first version of the deluxe edition features 31 tracks—all of the vocal performances and one of the three instrumental tracks. In the US, this 31-track version is available solely at Best Buy stores and in a digital version from iTunes, while in Europe it is available at other retail outlets. A second version of the deluxe edition is available at other retail outlets and digital download suppliers. The second version differs from the 31-track version in that it omits two tracks ("Why Don't We Do It in the Road?" and "I Want You (She's So Heavy)").

The song "It Won't Be Long" was released as a single on iTunes on September 11, 2007. From October 15 to 17, 2007, and again from October 22 to 23, 2007, the 31-track deluxe edition was the #1 downloaded album on iTunes.

The soundtrack includes seven songs from The Beatles (also known as The White Album), five from Magical Mystery Tour, five from Abbey Road, four from Sgt. Pepper's Lonely Hearts Club Band, three from With the Beatles, two from A Hard Day's Night, two from Let It Be, one from Help!, one from Rubber Soul, and three other non-album singles.

== Production ==
In March 2007, the media reported a dispute over the final cut of the film. Concerned with the length of director Julie Taymor's cut of the film, Revolution Studios chairman Joe Roth tested a sneak preview of a shortened version without first informing Taymor. The incident sparked some heat between the two, later involving Sony Pictures' Amy Pascal urging Taymor to agree to the shorter version. After several months of dispute, Taymor's version was eventually reinstated as the theatrically released version. While the production budget was originally reported as $45 million, documents from Roth's sale of Revolution Studios revealed the actual cost of the film to be $70.8 million.

== Release ==
The film's release date and release pattern became the subject of some media and public discussion. The film had been originally scheduled for release in November 2006. The release was postponed because the editing process became extended and internal disputes arose. The film was subsequently scheduled for a wide release on approximately 1000 US screens on September 28, 2007. In early September 2007, Sony announced that the release would be brought forward to September 14, 2007, with a "platform release" pattern starting on a small number of screens—with additional screens to be added in subsequent weeks.

The film received its world premiere on Monday, September 10, 2007, at the Toronto International Film Festival. The film was then given a very limited "platform release" on 27 screens in the US on Friday, September 14. The film had the second-highest "per-screen" average on its opening weekend. In the following three weeks, the release was gradually expanded to select regions. After four weeks in limited release, on October 12, the film was elevated to a comparatively broader release on 954 US screens, breaking into the US box office top ten at #8.

=== Home media ===
The DVD, UMD, and Blu-ray formats were released on February 5, 2008. On January 9, 2018, the film was re-released on Ultra HD Blu-ray.

== Reception ==
=== Critical response ===
Rotten Tomatoes gives the film an approval rating of 53% based on 176 reviews. The website's critical consensus reads, "Psychedelic musical numbers can't mask Across the Universe's clichéd love story and thinly written characters." Metacritic gives the film a weighted average score of 56 out of 100, based on 29 critics, indicating "mixed or average" reviews.

Roger Ebert of the Chicago Sun-Times was extremely positive towards the film, giving it four out of four stars, calling it "an audacious marriage of cutting-edge visual techniques, heart-warming performances, 1960s history and the Beatles songbook" and calling Julie Taymor an "inventive choreographer".

Ringo Starr, Yoko Ono, Paul McCartney and Olivia Harrison praised the film after seeing it. Julie Taymor, the director of the film, was interviewed about her screening with McCartney: "At the end of the screening I did the classic thing. I asked him, 'Was there anything you didn't like?' He said, 'What's not to like?'"

The film appeared on a few notable critics' top ten lists of the best films of 2007, including 34 from American film critics:

- 1st – Carrie Rickey, The Philadelphia Inquirer
- 7th – Roger Ebert, Chicago Sun-Times
- 9th – Stephen Holden, The New York Times

=== Awards and nominations ===
- 65th Golden Globe Awards
  - Nominee for Golden Globe Award for Best Motion Picture - Musical or Comedy
- 80th Academy Awards
  - Nominee for Best Costume Design
- 19th GLAAD Media Awards
  - Nominee for Best Film – Wide Release

== Potential sequel ==
In October 2020, Julie Taymor announced that the development of a sequel was underway. Jim Sturgess and Evan Rachel Wood had been in discussions about reprising their roles, while the story would take place during the 1970s and feature additional songs by the Beatles.

== See also ==
- List of cover versions of Beatles songs
- The Beatles' influence on popular culture
