= Cast Iron Shore =

Former neighborhood of Liverpool, England

- Riverbank
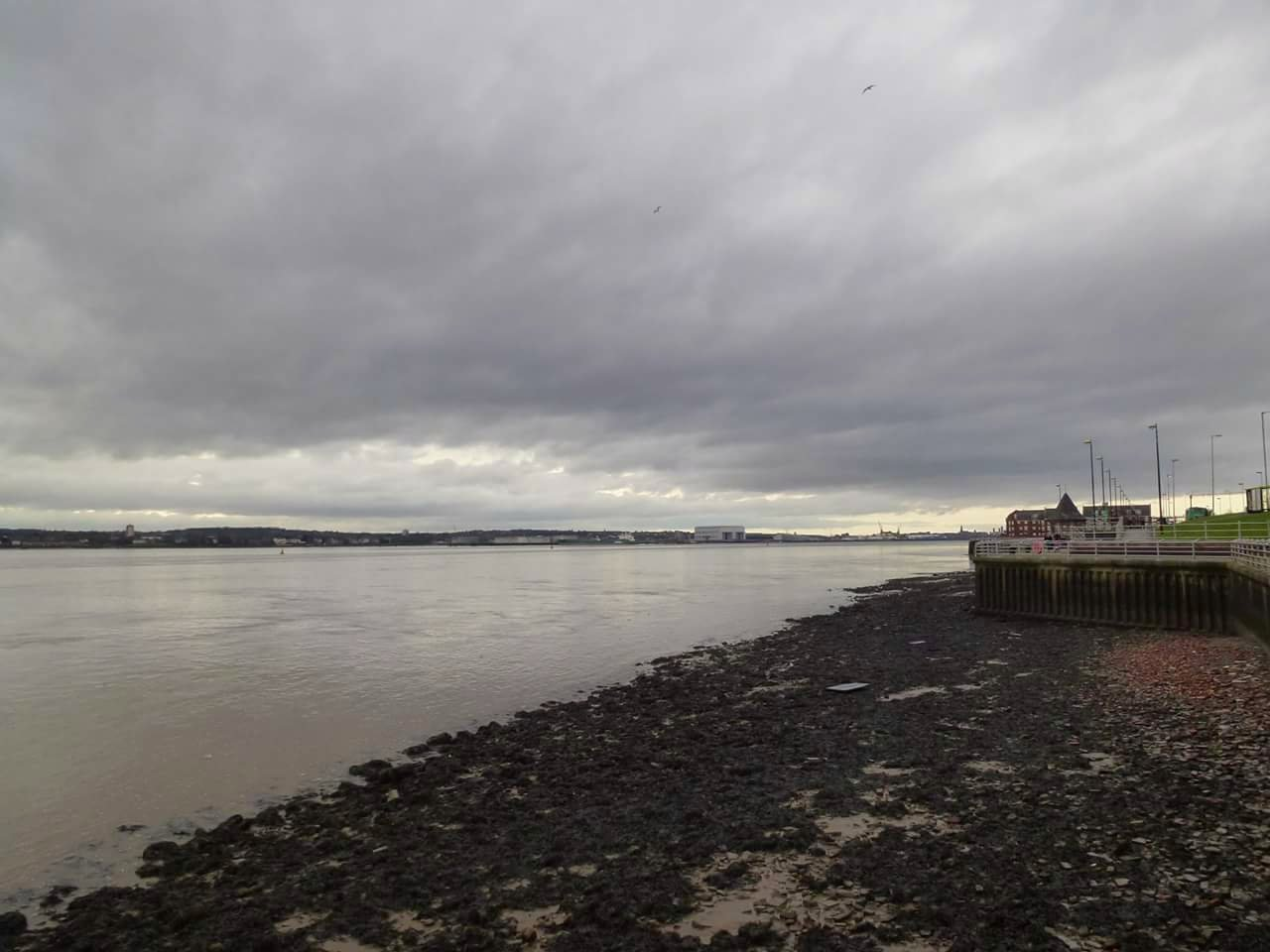
- Cast Iron Shore
- Interactive map of Cast Iron Shore
- Coordinates: 53°22′27″N 02°57′46″W
- Elevation: 0 m

The Cast Iron Shore (colloquially known as "the Cazzy") was a name given to the banks of the Mersey in south Liverpool due to the presence of an iron foundry. The Cast Iron Shore is mentioned in the Beatles' song "Glass Onion".

== Background ==
The "Cazzy" got its name from the rust residue left after ships were scrapped on the foreshore at Dingle. The area was just beyond the last of the South Docks, the Herculaneum Dock. The beach in that area turned red from the ferric oxide left in the sand.

St Michael's Church, opened in 1815, was known as the Cast Iron Church because of the extensive use of cast iron in its construction.
