= Love (Beatles album) =

2006 remix album by the Beatles

Soundtrack album / Remix album by the Beatles
- Released: 20 November 2006
- Recorded: 1963–1969
- Studios: EMI, Trident, Olympic and Apple studios, London, EMI Studios, Bombay and Hollywood Bowl, Los Angeles; mixed 2004–2006 at Abbey Road Studios
- Genres: Rock; psychedelic rock; progressive rock; mashup; sound collage
- Length: 78:38 (CD); 79:06 (vinyl); 80:28 (DVD-audio); 86:41 (iTunes)
- Labels: Apple; Capitol; Parlophone
- Producers: George Martin; Giles Martin
- Compiler: George Martin

The Beatles chronology
| The Capitol Albums, Volume 2 (2006) | Love (2006) | The Beatles (The Original Studio Recordings) (2009) |

Love is a soundtrack remix album of music recorded by the Beatles, released in November 2006. It features music compiled and remixed as a mashup for the Cirque du Soleil show Love. The album was produced by George Martin and his son Giles Martin, who said, "What people will be hearing on the album is a new experience, a way of re-living the whole Beatles musical lifespan in a very condensed period."

The album was George Martin's final album as a producer before his death in 2016.

== Background ==
George Martin and his son Giles began work on Love after obtaining permission from Paul McCartney, Ringo Starr, Yoko Ono and Olivia Harrison (the latter two representing the estates of John Lennon and George Harrison, respectively). The idea for using the Beatles' music in a Cirque du Soleil production had originally come from Harrison, who died in November 2001, through his friendship with the company's founder, Guy Laliberté.

Speaking to Mojo editor Jim Irvin in December 2006, Giles Martin said that he first created a demo combining "Within You Without You" with "Tomorrow Never Knows", which he then nervously presented to McCartney and Starr for their approval. In Martin's recollection, "they loved it", with McCartney saying: "This is what we should be doing, more of this."

In discussing the project, Giles Martin commented that elements were used from recordings in the Beatles catalogue, "the original four tracks, eight tracks and two tracks and used this palette of sounds and music to create a soundbed". Because he was concerned that they might not get the green light to proceed with Love, he began by making digital back-ups of the original multi-track recordings, just to get started on the project. He also said that he and his father mixed more music than was eventually released, including "She's Leaving Home" and a version of "Girl" that he was particularly fond of, with the latter eventually being released in 2011 as a bonus track on the album on iTunes.

McCartney and Starr both responded very positively to the completed album. McCartney said that it "puts The Beatles back together again, because suddenly there's John and George with me and Ringo". Starr commended the Martins for their work, adding that Love was "really powerful for me and I even heard things I'd forgotten we'd recorded".

== Composition ==
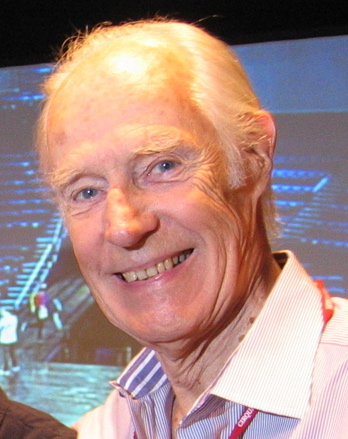
George Martin at a performance of the Love stage show

Love contains elements from 130 individual commercially released and demo recordings of the Beatles, and is a complex remix and polymix of multiple songs known as a mashup. As described by Alexis Petridis, mashups were popular earlier in the 2000s, with the Beatles serving as popular material; examples included Danger Mouse The Grey Album (2004), on which the producer fuses Jay-Z's rapping with music from the Beatles' White Album (1968), and Go Home Productions' "Paperback Believer", which used the Beatles' "Paperback Writer" and the Monkees' "Daydream Believer". McCartney was a fan of the "bootleg explosion", and hired mash-up producer Freelance Hellraiser as a DJ on his 2004 world tour, leading to the 2005 collaboration Twin Freaks.

Love has also been described as a sound collage. According to Neil Spencer of The Observer, the album's 26 tracks "are set in an ambient flow of sound collages", while according to David Cavanagh, Love comprises mashups and megamixes that play "plurally, in collage form", resulting in an album that "[flies] in the face of tradition by placing The Beatles in a 21st century sampladelic culture."

=== Track element notes ===
- "Because" – According to an interview with the Martins in Entertainment Weekly, the opening track includes the bird sounds used in the World Wildlife Fund version of "Across the Universe", as well as "Free as a Bird". In addition, a new recording of a wood pigeon was implemented "to make it more British", according to George Martin.
- "Get Back" – The track uses the opening guitar chord from "A Hard Day's Night", the drum and guitar solos from "The End", percussion from "Sgt. Pepper's Lonely Hearts Club Band (Reprise)", and the orchestral swell from "A Day in the Life".
- "Glass Onion" – This track includes guitar from "Things We Said Today", horns from "Penny Lane" and vocals from "Hello Goodbye".
- "I Want to Hold Your Hand" – George and Giles Martin stated that elements from both the studio recording and the Hollywood Bowl live performance were used in the 5.1 surround sound mix.
- "Drive My Car/The Word/What You're Doing" – The medley features the guitar solo from "Taxman" and the horn section from "Savoy Truffle". The Martins said they also remixed keyboards from "Lucy in the Sky with Diamonds" and backing vocals from "Helter Skelter" into the track.
- "Gnik Nus" – The track contains the vocal arrangement of "Sun King" played in reverse and accompanied by tambura drone.
- "Something" (with "Blue Jay Way" transition) – The track emphasises the lead vocal and George Martin's string arrangement on "Something" before transitioning into "Blue Jay Way", which also includes elements from "Nowhere Man". Giles Martin said the portion from "Blue Jay Way" set the mood for the next track, which they created in response to an idea by the director of the Love show for a "macabre Victorian circus".
- "Being for the Benefit of Mr. Kite!/I Want You (She's So Heavy)/Helter Skelter" – The track contains the whole of "Being for the Benefit of Mr. Kite!", guitars from "I Want You (She's So Heavy)", and heavily delayed vocals from "Helter Skelter". It also includes horse sounds from "Good Morning, Good Morning", harmonium and other elements from "Cry Baby Cry" and laughter from "Piggies".
- "Strawberry Fields Forever" – This version builds from an acoustic demo to incorporate sections of take 1 of the song (including harmony vocals that were cut from the edit of take 1 issued on the 1996 Anthology 2 compilation) and take 26. At the end of the track, it includes the orchestral section from "Sgt. Pepper's Lonely Hearts Club Band", the piano solo from "In My Life", the brass included in "Penny Lane", the cello and harpsichord from "Piggies", and the coda of "Hello, Goodbye". According to author John Winn, part of "I'm Only Sleeping" also appears in the closing mashup.
- "Within You Without You/Tomorrow Never Knows" – This track combines the vocals and the dilruba from "Within You Without You" with the bass and drums from "Tomorrow Never Knows".
- "Lucy in the Sky with Diamonds" – The track includes horns and guitars from "Sgt. Pepper's Lonely Hearts Club Band", clavioline from "Baby, You're a Rich Man", and sound effects from "Tomorrow Never Knows".
- "Octopus's Garden" – This track contains the string arrangement from "Good Night", sound effects and vocal elements from "Yellow Submarine", and elements from "Lovely Rita", "Helter Skelter" and ends with the beginning guitar riff from "Sun King".
- "Lady Madonna" – The song includes the percussion intro from "Why Don't We Do It in the Road?", the piano from "Ob-La-Di, Ob-La-Da", the guitar riff from "Hey Bulldog", Billy Preston's organ solo from "I Want You (She's So Heavy)" and Eric Clapton's guitar solo from "While My Guitar Gently Weeps".
- "Here Comes the Sun" (with "The Inner Light" transition) – As mentioned by Giles Martin, the track includes tabla and dilruba from "Within You Without You", backing vocals from "Oh! Darling" and a bass line from "I Want You (She's So Heavy)".
- "Come Together/Dear Prudence" (with "Cry Baby Cry" transition) – The track contains nearly all of "Come Together", which transitions into "Dear Prudence". It concludes with the vocal part from the end of "Cry Baby Cry", strings from "Eleanor Rigby", and what Giles Martin referred to as the "climax" from "A Day in the Life".
- "While My Guitar Gently Weeps" – The track uses a George Harrison demo of the song, previously issued on the Anthology 3 compilation. George Martin wrote a new orchestral score for the track, which he described as being his final Beatles string arrangement.
- "All You Need Is Love" – The track includes the guitar from "Ticket to Ride", elements from "Baby You're a Rich Man", "Rain" and "Sgt. Pepper's Lonely Hearts Club Band", and ends with orchestration from "Good Night" and the sign-off from The Beatles Third Christmas Record.

== Release and reception ==
Professional ratings
Aggregate scores
| Source | Rating |
|---|---|
| Metacritic | 83/100 |
Review scores
| Source | Rating |
| AllMusic | 3/5 stars |
| Blender | 5/5 stars |
| Entertainment Weekly | A |
| The Guardian | 4/5 stars |
| NME | 8/10 |
| The Observer | 5/5 stars |
| Pitchfork | 8.5/10 |
| PopMatters | 6/10 |
| Q | 4/5 stars |
| Rolling Stone | 3.5/5 stars |
| Slant | 5/5 stars |
| Uncut | 4/5 stars |

Love was first played publicly on Virgin Radio's The Geoff Show. Geoff Lloyd, the show's host, chose to play the entire work uninterrupted, to allow younger fans to experience an album premiere.

The album was released as a standard compact disc version, a two-disc CD and DVD-Audio package, a two-disc vinyl package, and as a digital download. The DVD-Audio disc contains a 5.1-channel surround sound mix (96 kHz 24-bit MLP), downmixable to two-channel. For backwards compatibility it also contains separate audio-only DVD-Video content with two-channel stereo (48 kHz 16-bit PCM) and 5.1-channel surround (448 kbit/s Dolby Digital and 754 kbit/s DTS).

Love placed at number 3 on the UK Albums Chart during its first week of release, trailing Westlife's The Love Album and Oasis' Stop the Clocks compilation. In the United States, it debuted at number 4 on the Billboard 200, where it was certified Platinum in late 2006. At the 50th Grammy Awards in February 2008, Love won in the categories Best Compilation Soundtrack Album and Best Surround Sound Album.

== Legacy ==
Chris Willman of Entertainment Weekly wrote in 2007: "LOVE really does feel fresh in a way that other latter-day Beatles products like Let It Be... Naked and even the Anthology collections haven't, quite. Freed from the need to adhere to chronology or chart success like the 10-million-selling 1's collection of a few years back, this instantly replaces that uninspired hits set as the album you'd give a kid who needs to discover the Beatles for the first time. It also manages to be the album you'd give the jaded boomer who's hearing these songs for the ten thousandth time."

In 2017, Uncut ranked the album at number 75 in their list of "The 101 Weirdest Albums of All Time".

== Track listing ==
All tracks written by Lennon–McCartney, except where noted.

1. "Because" – 2:44
2. "Get Back" – 2:05
3. "Glass Onion" – 1:20
4. "Eleanor Rigby" (with "Julia" transition) – 3:05
5. "I Am the Walrus" – 4:28
6. "I Want to Hold Your Hand" – 1:22
7. "Drive My Car/The Word/What You're Doing" – 1:54
8. "Gnik Nus" – 0:55
9. "Something" (with "Blue Jay Way" transition) (George Harrison) – 3:29
10. "Being for the Benefit of Mr. Kite!/I Want You (She's So Heavy)/Helter Skelter" – 3:22
11. "Help!" – 2:18
12. "Blackbird/Yesterday" – 2:31
13. "Strawberry Fields Forever" – 4:31
14. "Within You Without You/Tomorrow Never Knows" (Harrison/Lennon–McCartney) – 3:07
15. "Lucy in the Sky with Diamonds" – 4:10
16. "Octopus's Garden" (Richard Starkey) – 3:18
17. "Lady Madonna" – 2:56
18. "Here Comes the Sun" (with "The Inner Light" transition) (Harrison) – 4:18
19. "Come Together/Dear Prudence" (with "Cry Baby Cry" transition) – 4:45
20. "Revolution" – 2:14 (CD version) / 3:23 (DVD and iTunes version)
21. "Back in the U.S.S.R." – 1:53 (CD version) / 2:34 (DVD and iTunes version)
22. "While My Guitar Gently Weeps" (Harrison) – 3:46
23. "A Day in the Life" – 5:08
24. "Hey Jude" – 3:58
25. "Sgt. Pepper's Lonely Hearts Club Band (Reprise)" – 1:22
26. "All You Need Is Love" – 3:39

Digital bonus tracks

27. "The Fool on the Hill" – 3:30
28. "Girl" – 2:43

== Charts ==
=== Weekly charts ===
Initial chart performance for Love
| Chart (2006–07) | Peak position |
|---|---|
| Australian Albums (ARIA) | 2 |
| Austrian Albums (Ö3 Austria) | 3 |
| Belgian Albums (Ultratop Flanders) | 3 |
| Belgian Albums (Ultratop Wallonia) | 1 |
| Canadian Albums (Billboard) | 1 |
| Czech Albums (ČNS IFPI) | 23 |
| Danish Albums (Hitlisten) | 3 |
| Dutch Albums (Album Top 100) | 4 |
| Finnish Albums (Suomen virallinen lista) | 5 |
| French Albums (SNEP) | 1 |
| German Albums (Offizielle Top 100) | 2 |
| Irish Albums (IRMA) | 3 |
| Italian Albums (FIMI) | 7 |
| Norwegian Albums (VG-lista) | 8 |
| New Zealand Albums (RMNZ) | 2 |
| Polish Albums (ZPAV) | 2 |
| Portuguese Albums (AFP) | 5 |
| Swedish Albums (Sverigetopplistan) | 2 |
| Swiss Albums (Schweizer Hitparade) | 3 |
| UK Albums (Official Charts) | 3 |
| US Billboard 200 | 4 |
| US Top Rock Albums (Billboard) | 1 |

2011 chart performance for Love
| Chart (2011) | Peak position |
|---|---|
| Belgian Albums (Ultratop Flanders) | 84 |
| French Albums (SNEP) | 183 |
| Norwegian Albums (VG-lista) | 24 |
| Swedish Albums (Sverigetopplistan) | 38 |
| US Billboard 200 | 37 |

=== Year-end charts ===
2006 year-end chart performance for Love
| Chart (2006) | Position |
|---|---|
| Australian Albums (ARIA) | 33 |
| Austrian Albums (Ö3 Austria) | 69 |
| Belgian Albums (Ultratop Flanders) | 70 |
| Belgian Albums (Ultratop Wallonia) | 39 |
| Dutch Albums (Album Top 100) | 36 |
| French Albums (SNEP) | 31 |
| Swedish Albums (Sverigetopplistan) | 15 |
| Swiss Albums (Schweizer Hitparade) | 38 |
| UK Albums (OCC) | 17 |

2007 year-end chart performance for Love
| Chart (2007) | Position |
|---|---|
| Dutch Albums (Album Top 100) | 81 |
| French Albums (SNEP) | 169 |
| German Albums (Offizielle Top 100) | 52 |
| US Billboard 200 | 14 |
| US Top Rock Albums (Billboard) | 4 |

== Certifications and sales ==
Sales certifications for Love
| Region | Certification | Certified units/sales |
|---|---|---|
| Argentina (CAPIF) | Gold | 20,000^{^} |
| Australia (ARIA) | 2× Platinum | 140,000^{^} |
| Belgium (BRMA) | Gold | 25,000^{*} |
| Canada (Music Canada) | 2× Platinum | 200,000^{^} |
| Denmark (IFPI Danmark) | 2× Platinum | 80,000^{^} |
| France (SNEP) | Platinum | 200,000^{*} |
| Germany (BVMI) | 3× Gold | 300,000^{^} |
| Greece (IFPI Greece) | Gold | 7,500^{^} |
| Ireland (IRMA) | 3× Platinum | 45,000^{^} |
| Italy | — | 150,000 |
| Japan (RIAJ) | Platinum | 250,000^{^} |
| Mexico (AMPROFON) | Gold | 50,000^{^} |
| Netherlands (NVPI) | Gold | 35,000^{^} |
| New Zealand (RMNZ) | Platinum | 15,000^{^} |
| Poland (ZPAV) | Platinum | 20,000^{*} |
| Portugal (AFP) | Gold | 10,000^{^} |
| Spain (Promusicae) | Platinum | 80,000^{^} |
| Sweden (GLF) | Gold | 20,000^{^} |
| Switzerland (IFPI Switzerland) | Platinum | 30,000^{^} |
| United Kingdom (BPI) | 2× Platinum | 600,000^{^} |
| United States (RIAA) | 2× Platinum | 2,000,000^{^} |
Summaries
| Europe (IFPI) | 2× Platinum | 2,000,000^{*} |
| Worldwide | — | 5,000,000 |
^{*} Sales figures based on certification alone.^{^} Shipments figures based on certification alone.

== See also ==
- All Together Now, a documentary following the creation of the Cirque du Soleil show and its soundtrack
- Cirque du Soleil discography, a complete list of Cirque du Soleil's music releases with track listings
- List of best-selling remix albums worldwide
- Outline of the Beatles
- The Beatles timeline
