= Dingle, Liverpool =

Area of Liverpool in Merseyside, England

Coordinates: 53.3774°N 2.9613°W

Dingle
- Elswick Street, the filming location of the BBC TV series Bread

- Location within Merseyside
- Population: 13,246 2001 Census
- OS grid reference: SJ355885
- Metropolitan borough: Liverpool
- Metropolitan county: Merseyside
- Region: North West
- Country: England
- Sovereign state: United Kingdom
- Post town: LIVERPOOL
- Postcode district: L8
- Dialling code: 0151
- Police: Merseyside
- Fire: Merseyside
- Ambulance: North West
- UK Parliament: Liverpool Riverside

Dingle (known locally as the Dingle) is an inner city area of Liverpool, Merseyside, England. It is located to the south of the city, bordered by the adjoining districts of Toxteth and Aigburth. At the 2001 Census, the population was recorded at 13,246.

== History ==
Dingle is an area entirely within the boundaries of the old Toxteth Park. It is named after Dingle Brook (Dingle meaning a wooded valley), which rose at High Park Street and roughly followed Park Road towards the Old Toxteth Chapel, just south of Dingle Lane, and entered the River Mersey at Knott's Hole, which was a narrow bay or inlet next to where the Dingle flowed out to the Mersey.

On either side were steep rocky cliffs, with Dingle Point to the south west. In the 1850s, the Dingle area was purely rural. Liverpool lay to the north west, but this was an area of large houses, vast gardens, babbling streams and a long beach.

It was a mainly Protestant area, which developed from the influx of Welsh settlers, whilst the north end of Liverpool such as Everton and Vauxhall was settled by Irish immigrants, and became mainly Irish Catholic.

Between 1896 and 1956, the Liverpool Overhead Railway's terminus and only underground station was Dingle railway station, located on Park Road, the Dingle. This was the end of the line for services from Seaforth Sands in the north of the city, not to be confused with Seaforth and Litherland on the Merseyrail line to Southport.

== Description ==
Dingle is the last of the southern inner-city districts of Liverpool. Further south of Dingle are the suburbs. This area is traditionally working class, housing being mostly terraced, although many of the terraced streets are being pulled down to make room for more modern development.

Like many districts in Liverpool, there is not universal agreement about where the Dingle begins/ends. The old township of 'Toxteth Park' covers a much bigger area encompassing Parliament Street, Lodge Lane, Smithdown Road, Penny Lane, Greenbank Road, Aigburth Vale and St Michael-in-the-Hamlet. Some locals regard Dingle as being within the area encompassed by Warwick Street, in the north, Princes Road, Devonshire Road and Dingle Lane. Some define the Dingle as above but only as far as Grafton Street and not to the bank of the Mersey, as this area was part of Liverpool Docks. The area between Admiral Street and Princes Road is known as Princes Park, after the nearby parkland.

Location filming for the BBC television series Boys from the Blackstuff written by Alan Bleasdale and also Bread, written by Carla Lane, was primarily in Dingle's Garswood Street and Elswick Street respectively. In 2007, residents in the Shorefields area of Dingle signed a petition to block plans for a new twelve storey residential development on the infilled Herculaneum Dock.

Dingle is the location of the Cast Iron Shore.

== Transport ==
The nearest railway stations are Brunswick for people living in the Grafton Street area and St Michaels for those living in the Dingle Lane area.

Both stations are on the Northern Line of the Merseyrail system. Regular trains depart for Liverpool city centre, Southport and Hunts Cross.

Bus services are provided by Arriva North West and Stagecoach Merseyside & South Lancashire.

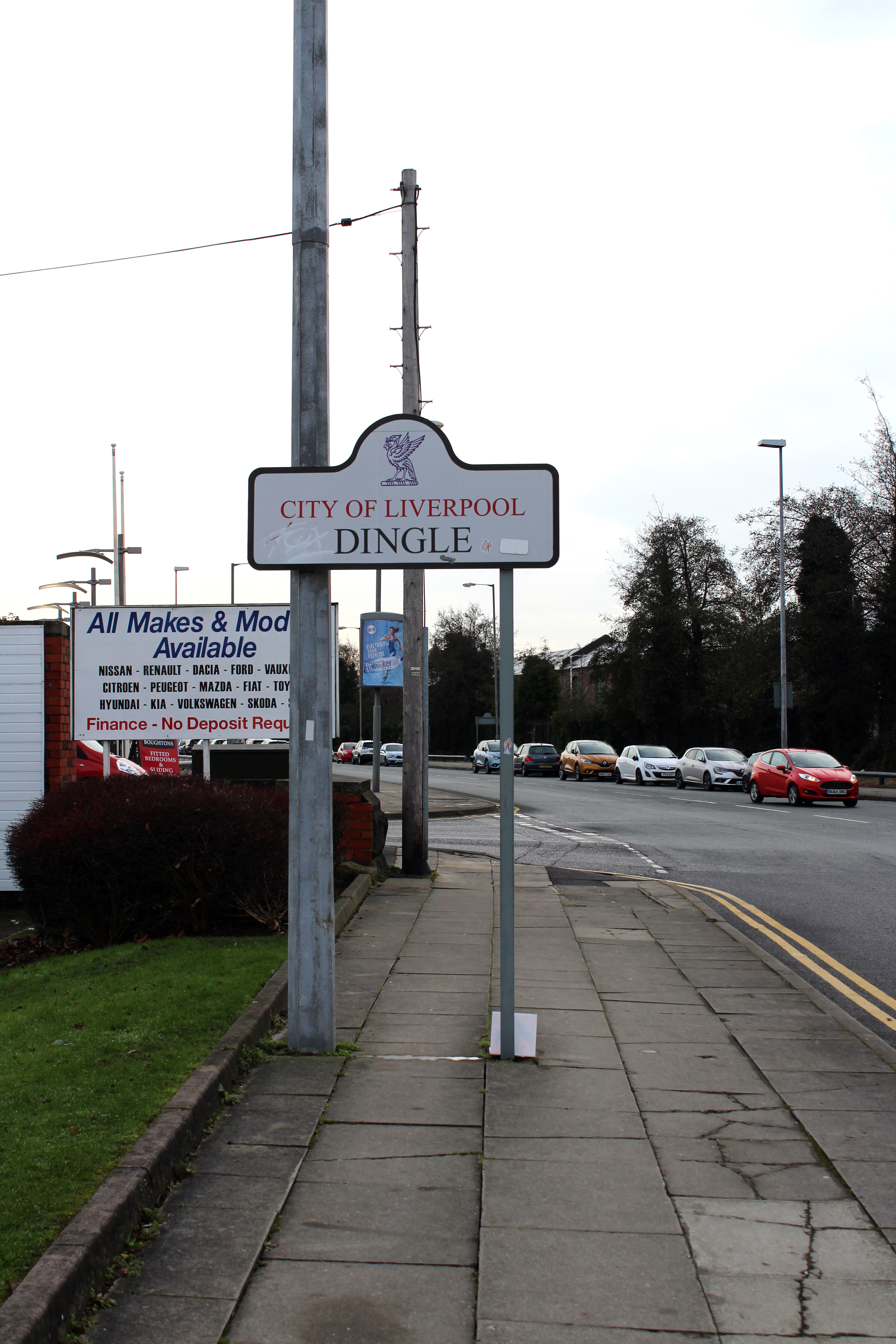
Sign on Sefton Street, Liverpool Docks area

== Notable people ==
- Michael Angelis, actor (longest-running uk narrator of Thomas & Friends from 1991 to 2012)
- Arthur Askey, comedian
- Eddie Braben, comedy writer
- John Conteh, world light-heavyweight champion
- Robbie Fowler, footballer
- Billy Fury, rock and roll singer / recording artist
- Fred Lawless, playwright
- Gerry Marsden, singer / recording artist
- Alan Rudkin, boxing champion
- Mick Miller (comedian), stand-up comedian
- Ringo Starr, musician and member of The Beatles (narrator of Thomas & Friends from 1984 to 1986)

== See also ==
- Dingle (Liverpool ward)
- Dingle, County Kerry, Ireland
