= James Wigfall =

American actor

James Wigfall (1942–1978) was an African-American theater artist best known for his early contributions to La MaMa ETC and his role as the Cowardly Lion in the Broadway musical The Wiz.

== Career ==
Wigfall appeared in several of the earliest productions staged at La MaMa—including in two separate productions of The Maids (1964 and 1972) and Tom Eyen's Three Drag Queens from Daytona in 1973. He explained his reason for wanting to reprise The Maids in 1972 to a reporter from the New York Daily News as being related to "the political aspects of the play." He believed The Maids was "about love and hate and self-hate".

He later appeared on Broadway in several roles, including as The Cop/The Bishop in Julian Barry's Lenny at the Brooks Atkinson Theatre (1971–1972), and as the Cowardly Lion alongside Stephanie Mills in The Wiz at the Majestic Theatre and Broadway Theatre (1977–1979).

Tom O'Horgan credited Wigfall with introducing him to La MaMa ETC's founder, Ellen Stewart. O'Horgan was directing an "all male production" of The Maids, in his loft on 3rd Street in 1964. "Jimmy Wigfall was in it", O'Horgan explained to a New York Times reporter in 1972, "and one night he brought Ellen Stewart to see it, and she became completely enamored of it. That's how I met Ellen, and that's how I came to work at Cafe La Mama."

== Death ==
Wigfall died in 1978, at the age of 36, from injuries he sustained in a traffic accident.
