= A Cross the Universe =

A Cross the Universe may refer to:

- A Cross the Universe (album), a 2008 live album by Justice
- A Cross the Universe (film), a 2008 documentary about Justice

== See also ==
- Across the Universe (disambiguation)
