= Trevor White (musician) =

British-Australian singer-songwriter (born 1947)

- Born: Trevor White; 3 August 1947 (age 79); Chelmsford, Essex, England
- Genres: Pop, glam rock, pop rock, rock and roll
- Occupations: Singer, musician, songwriter
- Instruments: Vocals, guitar, piano
- Label: Polydor Records
- Formerly of: Sounds Incorporated

Trevor White (born 3 August 1947, Chelmsford, Essex, England) is a British-Australian singer-songwriter. He is best known in Australia for playing the title role in the original Australian stage production of Jesus Christ Superstar. Elsewhere, his voice has become known as the singing voice for the character Rocky Horror in The Rocky Horror Picture Show (1975), though he was uncredited in the film.

== Biography ==
=== 1968–1971: Sounds Incorporated ===
In 1968, White joined British instrumental group Sounds Incorporated as a vocalist, keyboardist and drummer, replacing departing founding member Barry Cameron. The group visited Australia 3 times in 3 years and disbanded whilst in Perth in 1971.

=== 1972–1981: Solo career ===
After the disbandment of Sounds Incorporated, White auditioned for the Australian production of Jesus Christ Superstar and took the role of Jesus and relocated to Australia. White contributed to the original cast recording of the album.

White toured briefly with The Kinks and played with the band Sailor.

In the 1975 musical comedy The Rocky Horror Picture Show, White dubbed the singing voice of Rocky, who was played by Peter Hinwood.

In 1976, White signed with Polydor Records and released Out of the Shadows. The album spawns two top 100 singles.

In 1980, White signed with CBS and released a further two singles.

== Discography ==
=== Albums ===
Title	Album details
Out of the Shadows	Released: 1976; Format: LP; Label: Polydor (2907 034)

=== Singles ===
Year	Title	Peak chart positions	Album
Year	Title	AUS	Album
1976	"All You Wanna Do Is Dance"	47	Out of the Shadows
1977	"Just Another Night"	67	Out of the Shadows
1978	"Blackwater Music" / "All Because of You"	—	Out of the Shadows
1980	"It's Only Love"	88	non album single
1981	"Have You Seen Her?"	—	non album single

== Select Theatre Credits ==
- Jesus Christ Superstar (1972–73)
- Jesus Christ Superstar (1982–84)
- Rasputin (1987)
