= Sounds Incorporated =

British instrumental pop group

- Also known as: Sounds Inc.
- Origin: Dartford, Kent, England
- Genres: Rock and roll, beat, pop
- Years active: 1961–1971
- Labels: Parlophone, Decca, Columbia, Studio 2, Polydor
- Past members: Alan "Boots" Holmes; Griff West; Barrie Cameron; John St. John; Wes Hunter; Tony Newman; Trevor White; Terry Fogg

Sounds Incorporated, first recorded as Sounds Inc., was a British instrumental pop/rock group which recorded extensively in the 1960s.

== Background ==
Sounds Incorporated formed in early 1961, in Dartford, Kent, and gained a reputation in nearby South London for the fullness of their saxophone-led instrumental sound. In August 1961, after Gene Vincent's band, The Blue Caps, had been denied permission to work in the UK, Sounds Incorporated won the opportunity to back Vincent on his British tour and on recordings in London. This led to further opportunities to back other visiting American artists, including Little Richard, Jerry Lee Lewis, Brenda Lee and Sam Cooke.

== Career ==
Their only record with Parlophone, "Mogambo", failed to achieve significant sales. The band then moved to Decca, where they released a trio of singles, the last of which was recorded with producer Joe Meek, again with little success. However, while performing in Hamburg in Germany, they met and befriended the Beatles and in 1963 signed to Brian Epstein's management company, NEMS. In the same year, they appeared as musical guests in the film Live It Up!

The band's first two singles on new label Columbia, "The Spartans" and "Spanish Harlem", made the UK Singles Chart in 1964. These were the only successes that Sounds Incorporated enjoyed in their home country. That same year they became Cilla Black's backing band, and released their first album called Sounds Incorporated. It contained many stage favourites, but not their recent chart successes. The group's third Columbia single, a version of the "William Tell Overture", was included and turned out to be their greatest success in Australia, where it reached number 2.

The group toured the world as the Beatles' opening act, including the July 1964 concert in Hong Kong (see The Beatles' 1964 world tour) and the August 1965 concert at New York City's Shea Stadium. Sounds Incorporated's continuing popularity ensured a stream of work, including backing duties at the televised NME awards. In December 1964, NME reported that Sounds Incorporated would appear at the Hammersmith Odeon at the "Another Beatles Christmas Show".

Unusual musical instruments were a feature. The battery-operated Clavioline keyboard (as used by the Tornados) is heard on "Keep Movin'", but is also heard prominently on their previous disc before Meek, "Sounds Like Locomotion". Al Holmes played the lead melody on flute throughout "The Spartans".

1966 was the first year the group released no singles in their home country, although they recorded a second album, again simply titled Sounds Incorporated. This was released on EMI's fledgling Studio 2 label, primarily to show off EMI's mid-1960s advances and developments in stereo recording techniques. Any singles taken off the LP for foreign markets were in that format's standard mono, however, making these unusual items for UK collectors of the group.

By 1967 the band's name had been truncated to "Sounds Inc." The Beatles invited Cameron, Holmes and West to be the saxophone section on their track "Good Morning Good Morning", from the album Sgt. Pepper's Lonely Hearts Club Band. After this guest appearance, Sounds Inc. left EMI and released a solitary single on the Polydor label. Titled "How Do You Feel", it was their first single release to feature vocals.

The group began to disintegrate in the late 1960s. Drummer Tony Newman, known for his long solos, left to work as a session musician and at one stage joined the Jeff Beck Group. He later joined Reid Hudson and James Black to form British/Canadian power trio May Blitz.

For the remaining members of Sounds Inc., Cameron's departure for a career in A&R left a gap, which was filled by Terry Fogg (percussionist and drummer) and Trevor White, the band's first true vocalist. The group soldiered on, moving to and mainly playing in Australia for their final years together. Their act became more middle-of-the-road, exemplified in their final LP, which was released in many territories but not the UK, containing more vocals than instrumentals. Sounds Inc. finally broke up in 1971.

== Discography ==
=== Albums ===
==== Studio albums ====
Title	Details
Sounds Incorporated	Released in June 1964 by Columbia SX 3531
Sounds Incorporated	Released in November 1966 by Studio Two TWO 144
Sounds Incorporated (a.k.a. Maxwell's Silver Hammer)	Released in 1970 by Metronome HLP 10 282

==== Compilation albums ====
Title	Details
Sounds Incorporated – See for Miles Records	Released in 1993 by CD No. SEECD 371

=== EPs ===
Title	Details
Top Gear	Released in August 1964 by Columbia SEG 8360

=== Singles ===
Title	Details	Peak chart positions		Album
Title	Details	UK	AUS	Album
"Emily" "Mogambo"	Released in August 1961 by Parlophone R4815	— —	— —	Non-album singles
"Sounds Like Locomotion" "Taboo"	Released in November 1962 by Decca 11540	— —	— —	Non-album singles
"Go" "Stop"	Released in February 1963 by Decca F 11590	— —	— —	Non-album singles
"Keep Movin'" "Order of the Keys"	Released in August 1963 by Decca F 11723	— —	— —	Non-album singles
"The Spartans" "Detroit"	Released in March 1964 by Columbia DB 7239	30 —	8 —	Top Gear
"Spanish Harlem" "Rinky Dink" (from Sounds Incorporated (1964))	Released in July 1964 by Columbia DB 7239	35 —	22 22	Top Gear
"William Tell" "Bullets"	Released in November 1964 by Columbia DB 7404	— —	2 —	Sounds Incorporated (1964)
"Time for You" "Hall of the Mountain King"	Released in April 1965 by Columbia DB 7545	— —	— 58	Non-album singles
"My Little Red Book" "Justice Neddi"	Released in August 1965 by Columbia DB 7676	— —	— —	Non-album singles
"I'm Comin' Through" "On the Brink"	Released in October 1965 by Columbia DB 7737	— —	— —	Non-album singles
"How Do You Feel" "Dead as a Go-Go"	Released in October 1967 by Polydor 56209	— —	— —	Non-album singles

=== Other charted songs ===
Title	Year	AUS	Album
"Maria	1964	2	Sounds Incorporated (1964)
"Light Cavalry"	1964	71	Sounds Incorporated (1964)
"Warmth Of The Sun"	1970	95	Sounds Incorporated (1970)

"Maria" - Sounds Incorporated (1964) No. 2

"Light Cavalry" - Sounds Incorporated (1964) No. 71

"Warmth Of The Sun" Sounds Incorporated (1970) No. 95

Their recording career is currently covered on various CD sets. Virtually all of their recorded output is available, including rare and unreleased items. All tracks released as singles make up one compilation (The Singles). Both UK released albums are contained on another collection in stereophonic sound, and their third LP is covered in a specialist UK compilation album of rarer tracks. Many individual cuts spanning the first half of their career, appear on various specialist instrumental compilations.

Their third Decca single "Keep Movin'" / "Order of the Keys" is most sought-out by collectors, mainly due to being produced by Joe Meek. The first Sounds Incorporated was issued in both mono and stereo.

Television recordings still exist featuring the group in action, such as the 1964 Melbourne Beatles concert, although little if anything exists from the UK archives. They also appeared in Pop Gear, a music revue film made in colour, which has been released on video in recent years.

== Band members ==
- Alan "Boots" Holmes – baritone sax/tenor saxophone/flute (born Alan Frederick Holmes, 25 April 1939, Rotherhithe, South East London, died 8 January 2022, Sidcup)
- "Major" Griff West – tenor saxophone/flute (born David Edward Glyde, 19 December 1940, Barnehurst, Kent)
- Barrie Cameron – organ/baritone saxophone (born Barrie Cameron-Elmes, 25 October 1939, Erith, Kent, died 11 November 2019, Belvedere
- John St. John – lead guitar (born John Gillard, 1 April 1940, Dartford Hospital, Dartford, Kent)
- Wes Hunter – bass (born Richard Thomas, 17 December 1941, Barnehurst, Kent, died 4 April 2013, Barnehurst)
- Tony Newman – drums (born Richard Anthony Newman, 17 March 1943, Southampton, Hampshire)
- Trevor White – vocals/keyboards/piano/drums (born 3 August 1947, Chelmsford, Essex)
- Terry Fogg – drums/percussion (born Terrence George Fogg, 25 September 1945, Chesterfield, Derbyshire)

== See also ==
- List of rock instrumentals
- Sounds Orchestral
