= Timothy Mitchum =

American actor and singer (born 1992)

Timothy T. Mitchum
- Born: Timothy T. Mitchum; July 26, 1992 (age 33); Rochester, New York
- Other name: Timothy Mitchum
- Parent(s): Tim and Sandi Mitchum

Timothy T. Mitchum (born July 26, 1992 in Rochester, New York) is an American actor and singer. Mitchum performed the Beatles song "Let It Be" in the 2007 film Across the Universe, which he performed together with Carol Woods.

In 2003, Mitchum attended Best New Talent in LA, and landed the role as the lion prince Simba in The Lion King. He played the role as Simba for 13 months, and was later asked to return but because he had grown taller and his voice had gotten deeper, he could no longer fit the role as Simba. He also appeared at the New York Metro Fest for Beatles Fans and performed "Let It Be" alongside the Beatles tribute band Liverpool. He also premiered in August Rush with Robin Williams and Terrence Howard.

According to imdb.com, Mitchum also appeared in Law & Order: Criminal Intent and Conviction.

== Grammy Awards ==
In February 2008 Mitchum performed "Let It Be" at the Grammys and appeared on The Ellen DeGeneres Show. After the Grammys, Mitchum met with Stevie Wonder and together they performed "For Once in My Life" on their harmonicas.

== Currently ==
Timothy is currently attending the State University of New York at Fredonia's School of Music. He is also a member of SUNY Fredonia's Weapons of Jazz.
