= Glass Onion (song) =

1968 song by the Beatles

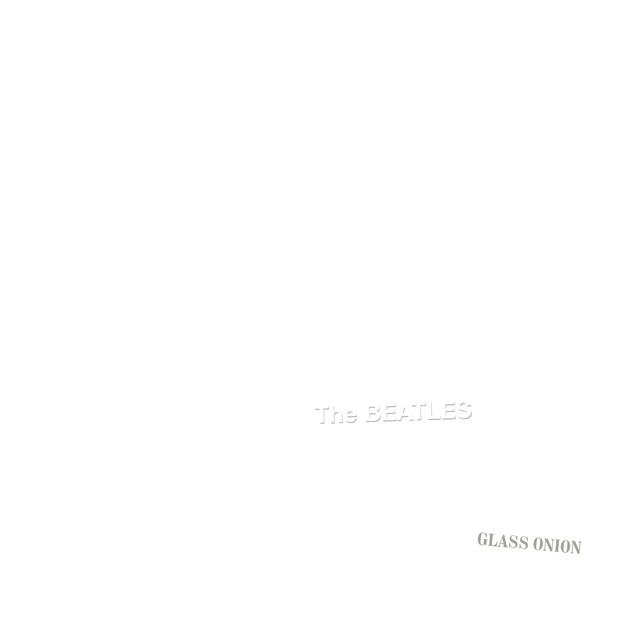
- Cover art for the digital single released as part of The Beatles: 50th Anniversary Edition

Song by the Beatles

from the album The Beatles
- Released: 22 November 1968
- Recorded: 11–13 September & 10 October 1968
- Studio: EMI, London
- Genre: Psychedelic rock
- Length: 2:17
- Label: Apple
- Songwriter: Lennon–McCartney
- Producer: George Martin

Music video
- "Glass Onion (2018 Mix)" on YouTube

"Glass Onion" is a song by the English rock band the Beatles from their 1968 double album The Beatles (also known as the "White Album"). The song was written by John Lennon and credited to Lennon–McCartney.

== Lyrics ==
Lennon wrote the song to confuse people who read too much into the lyrical meanings of Beatles songs, which annoyed him. Many lines refer to earlier Beatles songs, including "Strawberry Fields Forever", "I Am the Walrus", "Lady Madonna", "The Fool on the Hill", and "Fixing a Hole". The song also refers to the "Cast Iron Shore", a coastal area of south Liverpool known to local people as "The Cazzy". Lennon dismissed any deep meaning to the mysterious lyrics:

I threw the line in—"the Walrus was Paul"—just to confuse everybody a bit more. ... It could have been "the fox terrier is Paul". I mean, it's just a bit of poetry. I was having a laugh because there'd been so much gobbledygook about Pepper—play it backwards and you stand on your head and all that.

"Glass Onion" was a name suggested by Lennon for the Iveys, a group who signed to Apple Records in 1968 and later became Badfinger.

== Recording ==
The song was one of several recorded as a demo at George Harrison's Esher home in 1968 before the recording sessions for The Beatles. The Esher demo was first released on Anthology 3 (1996) and the 2018 deluxe edition of The Beatles. Anthology 3 also included an alternate version that contained various sound effects rather than the string arrangement.

This is the first track on The Beatles to feature Ringo Starr on drums. Starr briefly left the group during recording sessions for the album, and drums on both "Back in the U.S.S.R." and "Dear Prudence" were played by Paul McCartney.

== Legacy ==
Coinciding with the 50th anniversary of its release, Jacob Stolworthy of The Independent listed "Glass Onion" at number 10 in his ranking of the 30 tracks on The Beatles. He wrote of the song: "Lennon embraced his cheeky side with 'Glass Onion', a self-referential track which parades as symbolic. Instead, it was designed to trick fans into thinking their songs meant more than they actually do." For the 50th-anniversary editions of The Beatles, a music video was created by Alasdair Brotherston and Jock Mooney.

The song served as a namesake for the 2022 film Glass Onion: A Knives Out Mystery and is featured in the film's end-credits.

== Love remix ==
In 2006, the song was remixed for the Cirque du Soleil show Love and was included on the soundtrack for the show. The remix features elements of "Hello, Goodbye"; "Things We Said Today"; "Only A Northern Song"; "Magical Mystery Tour"; "Eleanor Rigby"; and "Penny Lane".

== Personnel ==
- John Lennon – double-tracked vocals, acoustic guitar
- Paul McCartney – bass guitar, piano, recorder
- George Harrison – lead guitar
- Ringo Starr – drums, tambourine
- Chris Thomas – recorder
- George Martin – string arrangement including:
  - Henry Datyner, Eric Bowie, Norman Lederman, & Ronald Thomas – violins
  - John Underwood & Keith Cummings – violas
  - Eldon Fox & Reginald Kilby – cellos

Personnel per Ian MacDonald

== Bibliography ==
- The Beatles (2000). Anthology.
- MacDonald, Ian (2005). Revolution in the Head: The Beatles' Records and the Sixties (2nd revised ed.). London: Pimlico (Rand). ISBN 1-84413-828-3.
- Wenner, Jann S (2000). Lennon Remembers (full interview from Lennon's 1970 interview in Rolling Stone magazine). London: Verso. ISBN 1-85984-600-9.
- "South Liverpool: Toxteth, Wavertree, Aigburth and Garston". allertonOak. 2009. Archived from the original on 20 October 2008.
