= Sun King (song) =

- Cover of the Northern Songs sheet music

Song by the Beatles

from the album Abbey Road
- Language: English; Macaronic
- Released: 26 September 1969
- Recorded: 24–25 July 1969
- Studio: EMI, London
- Genre: Psychedelia
- Length: 2:26
- Label: Apple
- Songwriter: Lennon–McCartney
- Producer: George Martin

Abbey Road medley chronology
"You Never Give Me Your Money"	"Sun King"	"Mean Mr. Mustard"

"Sun King" is a song by the English rock band the Beatles from their 1969 album Abbey Road. Written by John Lennon and credited to Lennon–McCartney, it is the second song of the album's climactic medley. Like other tracks on the album (notably "Because") the song features lush multi-tracked vocal harmonies, provided by Lennon, Paul McCartney and George Harrison.

== Background ==
The working title was "Here Comes the Sun King", but was shortened to "Sun King" to avoid confusion with Harrison's "Here Comes the Sun". The song slowly fades in from the harbour sounds at the end of "You Never Give Me Your Money". At the end of the song, the music stops abruptly and a drum fill by Ringo Starr leads into the next track, "Mean Mr. Mustard".

A faux mixing of Romance languages occurs in the last three lines of the song. In 1969, Lennon was interviewed about these lyrics and said, "We just started joking, you know, singing 'cuando para mucho.' So we just made up... Paul knew a few Spanish words from school, you know. So we just strung any Spanish words that sounded vaguely like something. And of course we got 'chicka ferdy' in. That's a Liverpool expression. Just like sort – it doesn't mean anything to me but (childish taunting) 'na-na, na-na-na!'" In an interview in 1987, Harrison said that the recording was inspired by Fleetwood Mac's "Albatross". "At the time, 'Albatross' (by Fleetwood Mac) was out, with all the reverb on guitar. So we said, 'Let's be Fleetwood Mac doing Albatross, just to get going.' It never really sounded like Fleetwood Mac... but that was the point of origin."

== Musical structure ==
The song is in the key of C and the chorus ("Here comes the Sun King") involves a I (C)–Imaj^{7} (Cmaj^{7} chord)–v^{7} (Gm^{7} chord)–VI^{7} (A^{7} chord) progression against a C–B–B♭–A vocal harmony. It also features 7th and 6th extensions which author Dominic Pedler described as "psychedelic". An interesting feature (according to Pedler) is the substitution of the Gm^{7} chord for the C^{7} dominant chord at the word "Sun". This represents an example of the jazz rule that allows a dominant (V) seventh chord (here C^{7}) to be replaced by a minor chord a fifth above (here Gm^{7}). The synchronous B♭ vocal harmonises with the ♭3rd (B♭ note) of the Gm^{7} chord. The coda beginning "Cuando para mucho", which is an exact copy of the instrumental intro, is initially sung to a ii (F♯m^{7} chord), which moves to V–I (B^{6} to E^{6} chords) on "cora-zon", then alternates back to ii (F♯m^{7}) on "Mundo paparazzi" and "Cuesto obrigato" before again V–I (B^{6}–E^{6}) on "para-sol" and "carou-sel".

The song is also notable for the vocally constructed ii chord in second inversion (Dm7/A) arising in the "Ahh" transition to verse, with the bass guitar playing a low G note, making it a Dm7/G. The frequent use of added sixth chords in the song accentuate its dreamlike feel. The song also has an example of major 9th harmony in the Cmaj^{9} chord on "Here comes the Sun King"; here, above the tonic C major triad, both B (seventh) and D (ninth) combine in the vocals "to form a suitably lush fanfare for the monarch himself."

== "Gnik Nus" ==
A portion of the vocals was included as a reversed a cappella in the track titled "Gnik Nus" (stylized as "gniK nuS" - "Sun King" spelt backwards) for the 2006 album Love. An instrumental section of "Sun King" was also used at the end of the track Octopus's Garden on the compilation.

== Personnel ==
- John Lennon – lead, harmony and backing vocals, electric guitar (with leslie effect)
- Paul McCartney – harmony and backing vocals, bass guitar, tape loops
- George Harrison – harmony and backing vocals, electric guitar (with tremolo)
- Ringo Starr – drums, bongos, tambourine, maracas
- George Martin – Lowrey organ

== Cover versions ==
- In 1976, the Bee Gees covered the song for the musical documentary All This and World War II.
- On September 26, 2019, The Bright Light Social Hour released a cover of "Sun King" in celebration of the 50th anniversary of Abbey Road.

== Sources ==
- Lewisohn, Mark (1988). The Beatles Recording Sessions. New York: Harmony Books. ISBN 0-517-57066-1.
- Pedler, Dominic (2010) [2003]. The Songwriting Secrets of the Beatles. Omnibus Press New York: Music Sales Limited.
