= Across the Universe (Sargent and Zebrowski novel) =

1999 novel by Pamela Sargent and George Zebrowski

- Authors: Pamela Sargent; George Zebrowski
- Language: English
- Genre: Science fiction
- Publisher: Pocket Books
- Publication date: October 1999
- Publication place: United States
- Media type: Print (Paperback)
- Pages: 217
- ISBN: 0-671-01989-9
- OCLC: 41925878
- Preceded by: My Brother's Keeper, Book Three: Enterprise
- Followed by: Wagon Train to the Stars

Across the Universe is a science fiction novel by American writers Pamela Sargent and George Zebrowski, part of the Star Trek: The Original Series saga.

== Synopsis ==
The Enterprise encounters the ancient colony ship 'Hawking'. Due to the relativistic effects of time travel, the crew and passengers have only aged a few decades while two hundred years have passed since they have launched. The crew of the Enterprise find difficulty dealing with these people from the past. The Hawking colonists are distrustful, somewhat paranoid and the ship itself hides a weapon of mass destruction.

== Inspiration ==
In Voyages of Imagination, George Zebrowski remembered: "Across the Universe went well, with the editing again seeking to keep us to the main characters' viewpoints. I don't recall how the idea was developed, but it was more complex and involved than the final book." On the story, Pamela Sargent adds, "We'd been discussing what might happen if a group of colonists that had set out from Earth to colonize another world, traveling at relativistic speed and aging only two or three decades while a couple of centuries passed, had been overtaken by a more technologically advanced group—in this case, the Enterprise and its crew. We actually wanted much of the story to be about the dilemma of these people, how they might acclimate to their encounter with this future civilization and the psychological problems that might cause. I think we were envisioning a darker more complex tale about people who are slowly aging on a one-way journey, who reach their planetary destination only to discover that the world they thought would be theirs was already settled. In the end, at the editor's suggestion, we ended up writing more of an adventure story. Not necessarily a worse story, simply a different story. Some of the dilemmas our invented characters would have to face are still there, even if they had to be incorporated into a story about an unknown planetary threat."
