= You Never Give Me Your Money =

1969 song by the Beatles

- Cover of the song's sheet music

Song by the Beatles

from the album Abbey Road
- Released: 26 September 1969
- Recorded: 6 May, 1, 15, 30, 31 July, and 5 August 1969
- Studio: Olympic Sound, London; EMI, London
- Genre: Rock; progressive pop
- Length: 4:02
- Label: Apple
- Songwriter: Lennon–McCartney
- Producer: George Martin

Abbey Road medley chronology
"You Never Give Me Your Money"	"Sun King"

"You Never Give Me Your Money" is a song by the English rock band the Beatles. It was written by Paul McCartney (and credited to Lennon–McCartney), and thematically documents the personal difficulties the band was facing. The song is the first part of the medley on side two of the 1969 album Abbey Road and was recorded in stages between May and August that year.

The song was the first one recorded for the medley, which was conceived by McCartney and producer George Martin as a way to use up fragments of various Lennon-McCartney songs. Author and music critic Ian MacDonald speculated that the medley was created as a grand finale to the Beatles career, but McCartney has since refuted some of MacDonald's claims about the origin of some Beatles songs. The backing track was recorded at Olympic Sound Studios in Barnes, London, but the remainder of overdubs occurred at EMI Studios. The song contains a suite of various segments, ranging from a piano ballad at the beginning through to guitar arpeggios at the end.

== Background ==
McCartney wrote the song when he was staying with his wife Linda in New York in March 1969, shortly after their wedding. This was a break following the Get Back/Let It Be sessions. John Lennon and McCartney were at risk of losing overall control of Northern Songs, the company that published their songs, after ATV Music bought a majority share. McCartney had been largely responsible for the group's direction and projects since manager Brian Epstein died in 1967, but he began to realise that the Beatles' group dynamic was unravelling. He was particularly unhappy at the others for wanting manager Allen Klein to help resolve financial matters. McCartney later said the song was written with Klein in mind, saying, "it's basically a song about no faith in the person". He added that the line "One sweet dream, pack up the bags, get in the limousine" was based on his trips in the country with Linda to get away from the tense atmosphere with the Beatles, though author Walter Everett thought the line was also a nostalgic look at the Beatles' touring years, which had ended in 1966.

Realising that Abbey Road could be the group's last album, McCartney and Martin combined various portions of tracks into a medley, which would act as a climactic finale to the group's career. McCartney later said that the idea of a song suite was inspired by Keith West's "Excerpt from A Teenage Opera". Some musical segments of "You Never Give Me Your Money" are also found as callbacks in the "Golden Slumbers" / "Carry That Weight" portion of the medley, including the opening verses and later guitar arpeggios.

Structurally, the music begins with a piano ballad and moves to several other styles, including boogie-woogie piano, arpeggiated guitars and nursery rhyme. Author Ian MacDonald speculates that the guitar arpeggios at the end of the track were influenced by "I Want You (She's So Heavy)" and the middle section of "Here Comes the Sun", and that the overall structure was inspired by Lennon's "Happiness Is a Warm Gun" from the previous year's album The Beatles, which also joined unrelated song fragments together.

== Recording ==
The basic backing track was recorded at Olympic Sound Studios in Barnes on 6 May 1969. Recording ran from 3 pm to 4 am the next morning. McCartney sang lead and played piano, Lennon played an Epiphone Casino guitar, George Harrison played a Fender Telecaster guitar fed through a Leslie speaker, and Ringo Starr played drums. The group recorded 36 takes, selecting take 30 as the best, which was made into a rough stereo mix. The song's structure as it appeared on Abbey Road had not been worked out at this stage, and the original recording ran onto a loose jam session, ending up as a fast rock-and-roll instrumental toward the end.

The track was completed in EMI Studios. McCartney overdubbed a lead vocal onto the basic track on 1 July, and further vocals and sound effects were added on 15 July. On 30 July, a reduction mix was made of the original eight track tape, so further overdubs could be made, and a rough mix of the Abbey Road medley was put together. The cross-fade from "You Never Give Me Your Money" into the next track, "Sun King", proved problematic, and the group made several attempts before deciding to merge the songs via an organ note. McCartney completed the instrumental overdubs on 31 July by adding a bass guitar part and additional piano overdubs, including some punched-in honky-tonk piano in place of the original.

The final recording session occurred on 5 August, when McCartney made a number of tape loops at EMI Studios, including bells, birds, bubbles and chirping crickets. Martin mixed the track into stereo on 13 August, and made 11 attempts at a final mix, combining the tape loops with the cross-fade into "Sun King", replacing the earlier organ note. He made another attempt at a final mix on 21 August, and this was used for the finished master.

== Personnel ==
According to Ian MacDonald:

- Paul McCartney – lead and backing vocals, piano, bass, wind chimes, tape loops
- John Lennon – guitar, backing vocal
- George Harrison – guitar, backing vocal
- Ringo Starr – drums, tambourine

== Other versions ==
American guitarist George Benson covered the song in a medley with "Golden Slumbers" in his 1970 album The Other Side of Abbey Road.

Comedy rock duo Tenacious D covered "You Never Give Me Your Money" as a medley with "The End" as a single which was released on 2 July 2021, with proceeds from sales of the single going to Doctors Without Borders.

== Notes ==
Citations

Sources

- Everett, Walter (1999). The Beatles as Musicians: Revolver Through the Anthology. Oxford University Press. ISBN 978-0-19-512941-0.
- MacDonald, Ian (1997). Revolution in the Head : The Beatles' Records and the Sixties. Pimlico / Random House. ISBN 978-0-7126-6697-8.
- Miles, Barry (1997). Paul McCartney : Many Years From Now. Seeker & Warburg. ISBN 978-0-436-28022-1.
- Lewisohn, Mark (1988). The Complete Beatles Recording Sessions. Hamlyn / EMI. ISBN 978-0-600-55784-5.
- Shepherd, John; Horn, David (2003). Continuum Encyclopedia of Popular Music of the World: Media, Industry and Society v.1: Media, Industry and Society Vol 1. Continuum International Publishing Group. ISBN 978-0-8264-6321-0.
- Winn, John C. (2009). That Magic Feeling: The Beatles' Recorded Legacy, Volume Two, 1966–1970. Random House. ISBN 978-0-307-45240-5.
