= Martin Luther McCoy =

American musician and actor (born 1973)

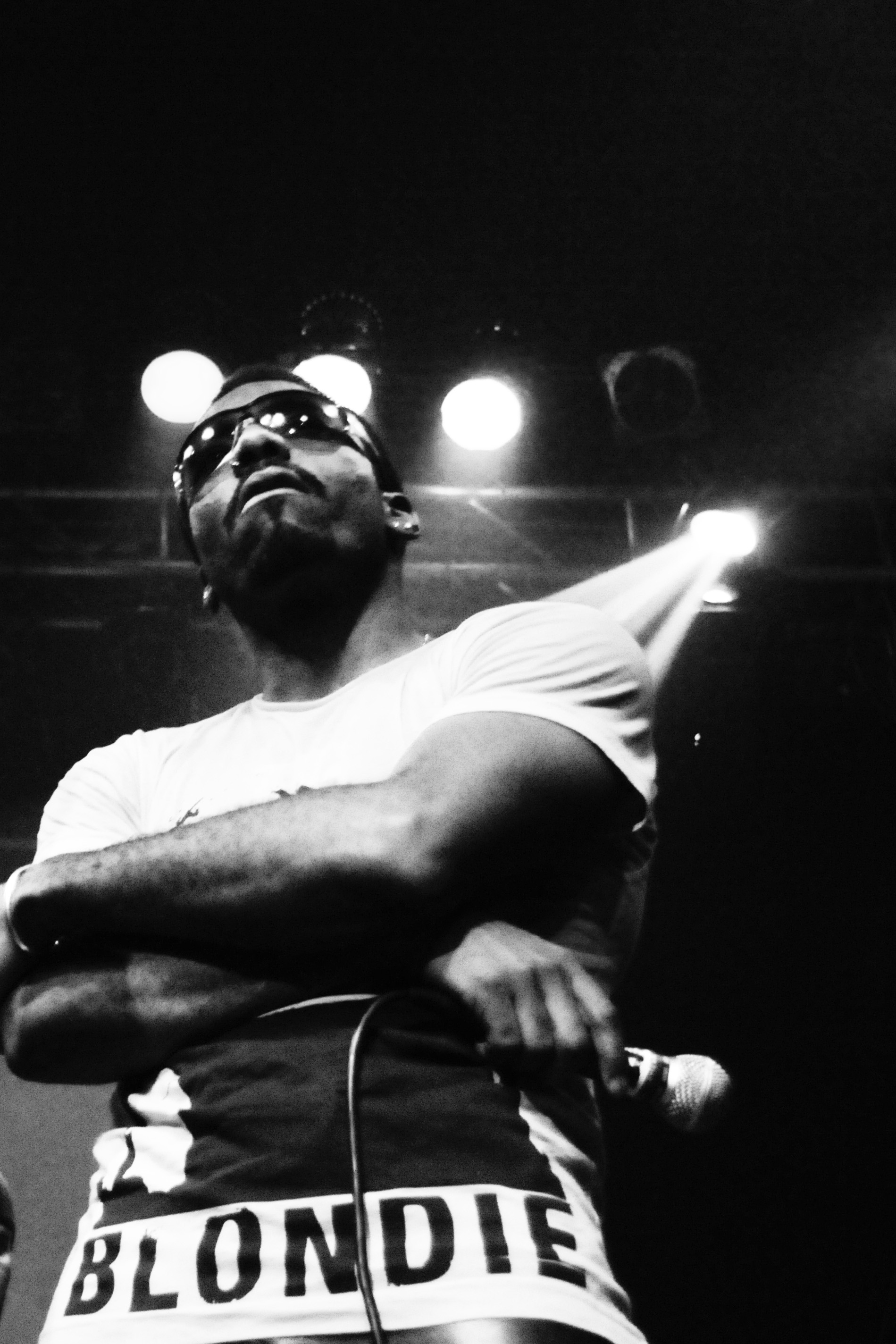
- Martin Luther McCoy performing at his Rebel Soul Fest showcase at the DNA Lounge in San Francisco, July 2008

Background information
- Also known as: Martin Luther
- Born: Martin Luther McCoy; August 1, 1973 (age 52); United States
- Genres: R&B, pop, rock, dance
- Occupations: singer, actor
- Instruments: vocals, guitar
- Years active: 1999–present
- Formerly of: The Roots
- Website: http://www.rebelsoulmusic.com/

Martin Luther McCoy (born August 1, 1973) is an American musician and actor.

== Early life ==
Martin Luther McCoy is a San Francisco native from the Bayview-Hunters Point neighborhood.

While pursuing a music career, McCoy continued his education, receiving a degree in Media Arts from Morehouse College with a concentration in Entertainment Law and Marketing and graduated in 1992.

== Discography ==
=== Albums ===
- The Calling (1999)
- Rebel Soul Music (2004)
- Love is the Hero (2012)
