= Good Morning Good Morning =

- Cover of the Northern Songs sheet music (licensed to Sonora Musikförlag)

Song by the Beatles

from the album Sgt. Pepper's Lonely Hearts Club Band
- Released: 26 May 1967
- Recorded: 8 and 16 February, 13, 28 and 29 March 1967
- Studio: EMI, London
- Genre: Rock; hard rock
- Length: 2:41 (stereo); 2:35 (mono)
- Label: Parlophone
- Songwriter: Lennon–McCartney
- Producer: George Martin

"Good Morning Good Morning" is a song by the English rock band the Beatles from their 1967 album Sgt. Pepper's Lonely Hearts Club Band. It was written by John Lennon and credited to Lennon–McCartney. Inspiration for the song came to Lennon from a television commercial for Kellogg's Corn Flakes. Another reference to contemporary television was the lyric "It's time for tea and Meet the Wife", referring to the BBC sitcom.

Lennon himself was critical of the track. "It's a throwaway, a piece of garbage, I always thought," he once said. "I always had the TV on very low in the background when I was writing, and it came over, and then I wrote the song."

== Recording ==
The basic track was recorded on 8 February 1967, with overdubs on 16 February (bass guitar and lead vocals), 13 March (brass section), 28 March (backing vocals and guitar solo), and 29 March (animal noises). The guitar solo was played by Paul McCartney on a Fender Esquire. At Lennon's request, George Martin brought in Sounds Incorporated to provide the song's prominent brass backing. Take eight, which contains Lennon's vocals from the subsequent session but also omits animal sounds, was released on Anthology 2 in 1996.

Lennon asked engineer Geoff Emerick to arrange the animal noises heard at the beginning (and end) of the song so that each animal heard was one capable of devouring (or frightening) the animal preceding it. The final sound effect of a chicken clucking was so placed that it transforms into the guitar on the following track, "Sgt. Pepper's Lonely Hearts Club Band (Reprise)". According to Emerick, these animal noises were inspired by the coda of "Caroline, No" that ended the Beach Boys' Pet Sounds album. They begin with the crow of a rooster, while the other animal sounds heard at the end of the song include birds, a cat, a dog, a cow, a horse, a sheep, a group of bloodhounds accompanying fox hunters on horseback with horns blasting, and a chicken.

The rapid 16th note bass drum fills were done on two bass drums, according to Beatles historian Mark Lewisohn.

For the Beatles' 2006 remix album, Love, the horse sounds were mixed into "Being for the Benefit of Mr. Kite!".

== Composition ==
The song is played at 117 beats per minute, has an unusual rhythmic feel, and uses different time signatures. Beats are played in groups of 2, 3 and 4, and time signature changes frequently. Parts with 5/4 and 4/4 bars alternate, with 3/4 transitions. Most of the song uses simple time, where the beats are divided into two, but the middle eight sections use compound time, where the beats are divided into triplets.

The song is divided into seven sections, two of which are repeated once and one twice, in a time-symmetric pattern A, B, C, B, C, B, A (disregarding the fade out of the last bar):

A: 4,4,4,4,4 (introduction: five bars, 20 beats)

B: 5,5,5,3,4,5,4,3,3,4,4 (eleven bars, 44 beats)
C: 5,5,5,3,4,4,4,4,4,4 (contains refrain: ten bars, 42 beats)
B: 5,5,5,3,4,5,4,3,3,4,4 (eleven bars, 44 beats)
C: 5,5,5,3,4,4,4,4,4,4 (contains refrain: ten bars, 42 beats)
B: 5,5,5,3,4,5,4,3,3,4,4 (eleven bars, 44 beats)

A: 4,4,4,4,4,4 (end: six bars, 24 beats, with fade out bar)

That adds up to 64 bars with 260 beats which, at the published 117 beats per minute, would result in a length of 2:13.333... minutes.

== Critical reception ==
The song received mixed reviews and is regarded as either one of the most groundbreaking tracks or one of the weakest on Sgt. Pepper’s Lonely Hearts Club Band. Far Out Magazine from the UK says "the song is still pumping with all the great bits of the album. Mad at points and simply sublime at others, the song, like the LP, has a habit of putting a smile on your face without even knowing it." Rolling Stone includes "Good Morning, Good Morning" at number 9 in its 2025 list of 50 "Terrible Songs on Great Albums", writing, "it’s … quite clearly something Lennon tossed off with little thought."

== Cover versions ==
- 2009 – Cheap Trick performed the song on their Sgt. Pepper Live album

== Personnel ==
Personnel per Ian MacDonald and the Sgt. Pepper’s Lonely Heart’s Club Band 50th Anniversary booklet.

The Beatles

- John Lennon – double-tracked lead vocal, rhythm guitar, backing vocal
- Paul McCartney – bass, lead guitar, backing vocal, drums
- George Harrison – backing vocal, lead guitar
- Ringo Starr – drums, tambourine

Wind instruments

- Barrie Cameron – saxophone
- David Glyde – saxophone
- Alan Holmes – saxophone
- John Lee – trombone
- Unknown – trombone
- Tom (Surname is unknown) – French horn
- Sounds Incorporated – brass

Production

- Geoff Emerick – engineer
- George Martin – producer
