= Why Don't We Do It in the Road? =

- 1982 promotional Evatone "Flexi-disc" release of the song, coupled with "Rocky Raccoon"

Song by the Beatles

from the album The Beatles
- Released: 22 November 1968
- Recorded: 9–10 October 1968
- Studio: EMI, London
- Genre: Rock and roll
- Length: 1:42
- Label: Apple Records
- Songwriter: Lennon–McCartney
- Producer: George Martin

"Why Don't We Do It in the Road?" is a song by the English rock band the Beatles, released on their 1968 double album The Beatles (also known as "the White Album"). Short and simple, it was written and sung by Paul McCartney, but credited to Lennon–McCartney. At just 1:42 in length, "Why Don't We Do It in the Road?" comprises 34 bars of a twelve-bar blues idiom. It begins with three different percussion elements (a hand banging on the back of an acoustic guitar, handclaps, and drums) and features McCartney's increasingly raucous vocal repeating a simple lyric with only two different lines.

== Background ==
McCartney wrote the song after seeing two monkeys copulating in the street while on retreat in Rishikesh, India, with the Maharishi Mahesh Yogi. He marvelled in the simplicity of this natural scenario when compared to the emotional turmoil of human relationships. He later said:

A male [monkey] just hopped on the back of this female and gave her one, as they say in the vernacular. Within two or three seconds he hopped off again and looked around as if to say "It wasn't me!" and she looked around as if there'd been some mild disturbance ... And I thought ... that's how simple the act of procreation is ... We have horrendous problems with it, and yet animals don't.

When asked what inspired the song during a 2001 interview with NPR's Terry Gross, McCartney quipped, "That was inspired by... Lord knows what. Probably sexual feelings, Terry!"

== Recording ==
On 9 October 1968, while John Lennon and George Harrison were working on two other songs for the album, McCartney recorded five takes of the song in Studio One at EMI Studios. Unlike its heavy blues result, the song began as an acoustic guitar number with McCartney alternating by verse between gentle and strident vocal styles. On this first night, McCartney played all the instruments himself. This version of the song can be found on the Beatles' Anthology 3.

On 10 October, McCartney and Ringo Starr finished the song; Starr adding drums and handclaps, and McCartney adding more vocals, bass guitar and lead guitar. Lennon and Harrison were again occupied, supervising string overdubs for "Piggies" and "Glass Onion".

== Lennon's reaction ==
Upon learning about the recording, Lennon was unhappy that McCartney had recorded the song without him. In his 1980 interview with Playboy, he was asked about it:

Playboy: "Why Don't We Do It in the Road?"
Lennon: That's Paul. He even recorded it by himself in another room. That's how it was getting in those days. We came in and he'd made the whole record. Him drumming [sic]. Him playing the piano. Him singing. But he couldn't—he couldn't—maybe he couldn't make the break from the Beatles. I don't know what it was, you know. I enjoyed the track. Still, I can't speak for George, but I was always hurt when Paul would knock something off without involving us. But that's just the way it was then.
Playboy: You never just knocked off a track by yourself?
Lennon: No.

"Julia" was recorded four days after the first session for "Why Don't We Do It in the Road?," and is a solo performance by Lennon (double-tracked lead vocals and acoustic guitar), though McCartney was present for the recording, as he can be heard talking to Lennon from the control room after a take on the Beatles' Anthology 3.

In a 1981 conversation with Hunter Davies, who had written a biography of the Beatles in 1968, McCartney responded to a Yoko Ono interview where she said McCartney had hurt Lennon more than anyone else, by saying, "No one ever goes on about the times John hurt me ... Could I have hurt him more than the person who ran down his mother in his car?" He then brought up Lennon's comments about "Why Don't We Do It in the Road?": "There's only one incident I can think of that John has mentioned publicly. It was when I went off with Ringo and did 'Why Don't We Do It in the Road'. It wasn't a deliberate thing. John and George were tied up finishing something and me and Ringo were free, just hanging around, so I said to Ringo, 'Let's go and do this.'"

McCartney also expressed some lingering resentment about a similar incident with "Revolution 9", recorded in June 1968, a few months before "Why Don't We Do It in the Road?": "Anyway, he did the same with 'Revolution 9'. He went off and made that without me. No one ever says that. John is the nice guy and I'm the bastard. It gets repeated all the time."

== Legacy ==
Coinciding with the 50th anniversary of its release, Jacob Stolworthy of The Independent listed "Why Don't We Do It in the Road?" at number 27 in his ranking of the White Album's 30 tracks. He wrote: "Essentially a Paul McCartney track song (he recorded it alone) and as good a song inspired by the sight of two monkeys having sex on a street in India could ever be."

The song was recorded by Lowell Fulson, an American blues singer, in 1969 on the Jewel label. Fulson's version included the lyrics "Why Don't We Do It in the Road?" "No one will be watching us" from the original, along with "Why Don't We Do It in the car?" and other lines not in the Beatles version. The Fulson recording credits Lennon and McCartney as writers and was featured on the soundtrack of the 2007 film American Gangster.

== Personnel ==
Personnel per Ian MacDonald:

- Paul McCartney – vocals, thumped acoustic guitar, piano, electric guitar, bass, handclaps
- Ringo Starr – drums, handclaps
