= I Want You (She's So Heavy) =

- Northern Songs sheet music cover

Song by the Beatles

from the album Abbey Road
- Released: 26 September 1969
- Recorded: 22 February, 18 & 20 April, 8 & 11 August 1969
- Studio: EMI and Trident, London
- Genre: Blues rock; progressive rock; hard rock
- Length: 7:47
- Label: Apple
- Songwriter: Lennon–McCartney
- Producer: George Martin

Audio sample
- file; help

"I Want You (She's So Heavy)" is a song by the English rock band the Beatles, written by John Lennon and credited to Lennon–McCartney. The song closes side one of their 1969 album Abbey Road and features Billy Preston on Hammond organ. It was the first song recorded for Abbey Road but one of the last on the album to be finished; the band gathered in the studio to mix the song on 20 August 1969, marking the final time that all four Beatles were together in the studio.

== Composition ==
Lennon wrote the song about his love for Yoko Ono. It begins in 6/8 time, with an arpeggio guitar theme in D minor, progressing through E^{7(♭9)} and B♭^{7} before cadencing on an A augmented chord. In this chord sequence, the F note is a drone. The bass and lead guitar ascend and descend with a riff derived from the D minor scale. As the last chord fades, a verse begins in 4/4 time, based on the A and D blues scales, with Lennon singing "I want you / I want you so bad ..." The two blues verses alternate, before the reappearance of the E^{7(♭9)} chord, and McCartney playing an aggressive bass riff which functions as a transition to the main theme throughout the song. The main theme repeats with Lennon singing "She's so heavy", with a long sustain on the last word.

The second set of verses are rendered instrumentally, with lead guitar reprising the melody. Another repeat of the "She's So Heavy" theme (this time featuring harmonies) is followed by Lennon singing a livelier repeat of the "I Want You" verse. During the next E^{7(♭9)} transition, Lennon screams "Yeah", until his voice breaks. The song's coda consists of a three-minute repetition of the "She's So Heavy" theme, with the arpeggios double-tracked, intensifying with a droning riff in drop D, and white noise generated by a Moog synthesizer played by Lennon fading in as the theme continues with multi-tracked guitars from Lennon and George Harrison and drums and bass guitar from Ringo Starr and McCartney respectively. In the middle of the 15th repetition of the theme, the song abruptly ends.

== Recording ==
The song, initially titled "I Want You", was rehearsed several times during the Get Back/Let It Be sessions, the first occasion being on 29 January 1969 at Apple Records. The basic track, and Lennon's guide vocal (which is used in the master), were recorded at Trident Studios on 22 February, shortly after shooting for the Let It Be film ended. Lennon played the lead guitar, as Harrison stated:

It's very heavy. John plays lead guitar and sings the same as he plays. It's really basically a bit like a blues. The riff that he sings and plays is really a very basic blues-type thing. But again, it's very original sort of John-type song.

Lennon and Harrison overdubbed multi-tracked heavy guitars on 18 April 1969. Billy Preston's Hammond organ and Ringo Starr's congas were added on 20 April 1969. "I Want You" received the "She's So Heavy" vocals on 11 August, and thus the title became "I Want You (She's So Heavy)". "'She's So Heavy' was about Yoko," Lennon told Rolling Stone. "When you're drowning, you don't say, 'I would be incredibly pleased if someone would have the foresight to notice me drowning and come and help me.' You just scream."

Three takes from 22 February were edited into a master (second generation), which was overdubbed, mixed down on 18 April (third generation), and overdubbed on 18 April, 20 April, 8 August and 11 August. Different overdubs were made to the second generation tape on 8 August. The mix is the third generation for 4:37 and then the second generation tape, which has white noise produced by the Moog synthesiser played by Lennon, and additional drums added on 8 August. The final overdub session for "I Want You (She's So Heavy)", which included the final mixing and editing, was the last occasion when all four Beatles worked in the studio together.

The final master lasted 8:04, but Lennon decided on a surprise ending. During the final edit, with the guitars, drums and white noise climaxing, he told recording engineer Geoff Emerick, who had assumed that he "would be doing a fade out", to "cut it right there" at the 7:44 mark, bringing the song (and side one of Abbey Road) to an abrupt end.

On the Beatles' 2006 remix album Love, the three-minute guitar coda from "I Want You (She's So Heavy)" is attached to "Being for the Benefit of Mr. Kite!", and snippets of that song and "Helter Skelter" are mixed in with the repeated guitar riff. The abrupt ending of the original is retained, but it cuts to wind-like white noise, not to silence as on the original. The mix also included the organ solo and the guitar solo from the Trident studio outtake.

== Influence and legacy ==
Pitchfork's Jillian Mapes describes "I Want You (She's So Heavy)" as a song in which Lennon "predates heavy-metal transcendence". In 2015, Josh Hart and Damian Fanelli, writing for Guitar World, placed it 34th in their list of the "50 Heaviest Songs Before Black Sabbath", and called the track a "bluesy rocker" that "might have inadvertently started doom metal".

Jo Kendall of Classic Rock magazine similarly states that "I Want You" predated "Black Sabbath's creation of doom rock by several months" and comments on its "Santana-like Latin blues section". James Manning of Time Out London recognises the song as the foundation for stoner rock.

The song is featured in the film Sgt. Pepper's Lonely Hearts Club Band (1978) during the scene where Big Deal Records president B. D. Hoffler (Donald Pleasence) negotiates the contract with the band over a sex-and-drug-induced dinner.

== Personnel ==
Personnel per Ian MacDonald.

- John Lennon – lead and harmony vocals, electric lead guitar, Moog synthesiser
- Paul McCartney – harmony vocals, bass guitar
- George Harrison – harmony vocals, electric rhythm guitar
- Ringo Starr – drums, congas, wind machine
- Billy Preston – Hammond organ
- Unknown – piano, claves
