= Because (Beatles song) =

1969 song by the Beatles

- Sheet music cover

Song by the Beatles

from the album Abbey Road
- Released: 26 September 1969
- Recorded: 1–5 August 1969
- Studio: EMI, London
- Genre: Psychedelia
- Length: 2:45
- Label: Apple
- Songwriter: Lennon–McCartney
- Producer: George Martin

Audio sample
- file; help

"Because" is a song written by John Lennon (credited to Lennon–McCartney) and recorded by the English rock band the Beatles. It was released on their 1969 album Abbey Road, immediately preceding the extended medley on side two of the record. It features a prominent three-part vocal harmony by Lennon, Paul McCartney and George Harrison, recorded three times to make nine voices in all.

== Composition ==
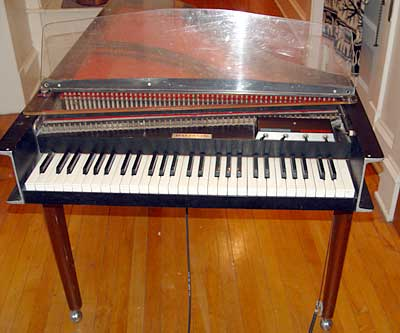
An electric harpsichord similar to the one used for "Because"

The song begins with a distinctive electric harpsichord intro played by producer George Martin. The harpsichord is joined by Lennon's guitar (mimicking the harpsichord line) played through a Leslie speaker. Then vocals and bass guitar enter.

"Because" was one of few Beatles recordings to feature a Moog synthesiser, played by George Harrison. It appears in what Alan Pollack refers to as the "mini-bridge", and then again at the end of the song.

Lennon said the song was inspired by Ludwig van Beethoven's Moonlight Sonata. "I was lying on the sofa in our house, listening to Yoko play Beethoven's 'Moonlight Sonata' on the piano. Suddenly, I said, 'Can you play those chords backward?' She did, and I wrote 'Because' around them. The song sounds like 'Moonlight Sonata,' too. The lyrics are clear, no bullshit, no imagery, no obscure references."

== Musical structure ==
With regard to citing Beethoven's "Moonlight Sonata", musicologist Walter Everett notes that "both arpeggiate triads and seventh chords in C♯ minor in the baritone range of a keyboard instrument at a slow tempo, move through the submediant to ♭II and approach vii dim^{7}/IV via a common tone." But while acknowledging the unusual shared harmonies, Dominic Pedler notes that the relationship is not the result of reversing the order of the chords as Lennon suggested.

"Because" concludes with a vocal fade-out on Ddim, which keeps listeners in suspense as they wait for the return to the home key of C♯ minor. Mellers states that: "causality is released and there is no before and no after: because that flat supertonic is a moment of revelation, it needs no resolution." The Ddim chord (and its accompanying melodic F♮) lingers until they resolve into the opening Am^{7} chord of "You Never Give Me Your Money".

== Recording ==
George Martin notes that on "Because":

Between us, we also created a backing track with John playing a riff on guitar, me duplicating every note on an electronic harpsichord, and Paul playing bass. Each note between the guitar and harpsichord had to be exactly together, and as I'm not the world's greatest player in terms of timing, I would make more mistakes than John did, so we had Ringo playing a regular beat on hi-hat to us through our headphones.

The main recording session for "Because" was on 1 August 1969, with vocal overdubs on 4 August, and a double-tracked Moog synthesiser overdub by Harrison on 5 August. As a result, this was the last song on the album to be committed to tape, although there were still overdubs for other incomplete songs. This approach took extensive rehearsal, and more than five hours of extremely focused recording, to capture correctly. McCartney and Harrison both said it was their favourite track on Abbey Road. Engineer Geoff Emerick said, "They knew they were doing something special, and they were determined to get it right."

A remixed version of the song, with the instrumentation removed so as to highlight the three-part harmony by Lennon, McCartney and Harrison, was released on 1996's Anthology 3 and as an a cappella on 2006's Love. In 2016, the Anthology 3 mix became the first recording by the Beatles to appear in a film trailer when it was featured in the trailer for Luc Besson's film Valerian and the City of a Thousand Planets. The three-part backing vocals were also used in the 2023 Beatles song "Now and Then".

== Personnel ==
Personnel per Ian MacDonald:

- John Lennon – triple-tracked harmony vocals (middle register), guitar
- Paul McCartney – triple-tracked harmony vocals (high register), bass
- George Harrison – triple-tracked harmony vocals (low register), Moog synthesiser
- George Martin – electric harpsichord
