= The Beatles' recording sessions =

The recordings made by the Beatles, a rock group from Liverpool, England, from their inception as the Quarrymen in 1957 to their break-up in 1970 and the reunion of their surviving members in the mid-1990s, have huge cultural and historical value. The studio session tapes are kept at Abbey Road Studios, formerly known as EMI Recording Studios, where the Beatles recorded most of their music. While most have never been officially released, their outtakes and demos are seen by fans as collectables, and some of the recordings have appeared on countless bootlegs. The only outtakes and demos to be officially released were on The Beatles Anthology series and related singles, and anniversary editions of their studio albums. Bits of some previously unreleased studio recordings were used in The Beatles: Rock Band video game as ambient noise and to give songs studio-sounding beginnings and endings. In 2013, Apple Records released the album The Beatles Bootleg Recordings 1963, which includes previously unreleased outtakes and demos from 1963, to stop the recordings from falling into the public domain.

Except where noted, all of the following songs are written by Lennon–McCartney and all single and album releases are for the United Kingdom.

== 1958 ==
=== Phillips' Sound Recording Services ===
In the spring or summer of 1958, The Quarrymen recorded two songs at Phillips' Sound Recording Services in their hometown of Liverpool. It was the group's first recording session, for which they paid 17s 6d (87.5p or £17.82 in 2025). The recordings were pressed onto a mono 10-inch 78 rpm shellac disc, (Note: The disc in question was a recording lacquer, also known as an acetate disc; this type of record comprised an aluminium-based disc coated with a thin layer of lacquer, into which sound grooves would be etched.) after which the sessions tapes were erased to be reused with new customers. Because of the low quality and age of the recordings, the songs are filled with a hiss but are still listenable. The record was not intended for release but for the Quarrymen's personal use.

When we got the record, the agreement was that we would have it for a week each. John had it a week and passed it on to me. I had it for a week and passed it on to George, who had it for a week. Then Colin had it for a week and passed it to Duff Lowe, who kept it for 23 years.

— Paul McCartney, The Beatles Anthology

In 1981, Lowe sold the record to McCartney for an undisclosed amount. McCartney then had audio engineers attempt to improve the sound quality.

- Recordings:
  - "That'll Be the Day" (Allison–Holly–Petty) – released on Anthology 1 (2:07)
  - "In Spite of All the Danger" (McCartney–Harrison) (3:25)
    - Edited (1990s) – released on Anthology 1 (2:44)
- Personnel
  - Musicians:
    - Colin Hanton – drums
    - George Harrison – backing vocals, guitar
    - John Lennon – vocals, guitar
    - John "Duff" Lowe – piano
    - Paul McCartney – backing vocals, guitar
  - Production staff:
    - Percy Francis Phillips – engineer

== 1960 ==
=== The Quarrymen Demos ===
The Quarrymen recorded several low-quality, homemade, mono demo tapes. Those known to still exist are:

- "I'll Always Be in Love with You"
- "One After 909" with Mike McCartney (1:42)
  - Another demo of "One After 909" is known to exist.
- "Some Days"
- "Well, Darling" (5:11)
- "Wildcat"
- John Lennon's spoken nonsense with radio

Although it is known that Lennon wrote "Winston's Walk" and that McCartney wrote "Ask Me Why" and "When I'm Sixty-Four" during this time, no demo tape of those compositions has ever turned up, but one is believed to exist.

=== Early Beatles homemade recordings ===
As they did when they were the Quarrymen, the Beatles recorded several low-quality, homemade, mono demo tapes. The tapes are the only known recordings featuring their former bass guitarist Stuart Sutcliffe. From the 16 known demos made in early 1960 at McCartney's house, only three have been released.

Recordings

- "Hallelujah, I Love Her So" (Charles) (2:22)
  - Edited and speeded up (A to B-flat) (1990s) – released on Anthology 1 (1:13)
- "You'll Be Mine" – released on Anthology 1 (1:38)
- "Cayenne" (McCartney) (2:30)
  - Edited (1990s) – released on Anthology 1 (1:14)

Personnel

- George Harrison – guitar
- John Lennon – guitar, vocals
- Paul McCartney – guitar, vocals
- Stuart Sutcliffe – bass guitar

=== Akustik Studio recordings ===
==== 15 October 1960 ====
In Hamburg, Germany, during the Beatles' first stint there, Lennon, McCartney and Harrison recorded a song as the backing group for Lu Walters, the bassist from Rory Storm and the Hurricanes. The Beatles' drummer, Pete Best, was not present, and Hurricanes drummer Ringo Starr played instead. It was the first time John, Paul, George and Ringo recorded music together. Sutcliffe was present at the session but did not play. The song was recorded in the small Akustik studio, in a similar arrangement to the Beatles' recordings at Phillips' Sound Recording Services. The song, with a spoken advertisement as the B-side, was pressed onto nine mono 78 rpm acetate discs. After the song was recorded, Walters, Starr, Ty Brian and Johnny Byrne, all in the Hurricanes, recorded "Fever" and "September Song". None of the recordings were ever released. The session tapes were most likely erased, and none of the discs are known to have survived.

Recordings

- "Summertime" (Gershwin) – lost or destroyed

Personnel

Musicians:

- George Harrison – guitar
- John Lennon – guitar
- Paul McCartney – guitar
- Ringo Starr – drums
- Lu Walters – vocals, bass guitar

== 1961 ==
=== 1st Tony Sheridan Recordings ===
==== 22–24 June 1961 ====
In what is now the Friedrich-Ebert-Halle, in the Friedrich-Ebert-Gymnasium (then known as Gymnasium für Jungen Harburg [English: Gymnasium for Boys in Harburg]), during the Beatles' second stint in Hamburg, the group, under the name "the Beat Brothers", recorded several songs with English rock and roller Tony Sheridan for an album called My Bonnie, produced by Bert Kaempfert. After recording the songs with Sheridan, the Beatles recorded two songs by themselves. Sutcliffe attended the session but did not play. The session tapes have since been destroyed, but some of the songs have been issued on numerous singles, EPs and albums, both official and unofficial. Information on the recording dates is sketchy, and much of the official documentation was lost in a fire. Sheridan later made more recordings with different backing musicians, resulting in some debate over which songs the Beatles are on. They are generally believed to appear on seven surviving tracks. The various mixes of the recordings have appeared on many compilation albums and other releases. Atlantic Records added extra instruments to two songs for a release in 1964. To complete their contract, the Beatles made more recordings in Hamburg on 24 May 1962.

Recordings

- "My Bonnie" (trad. arr. Sheridan) (English intro) with Tony Sheridan
  - Stereo mixed
    - Mono mixdown – released on as a single on 5 January 1962
    - Edited (intro removed) and stereo mixed (1964)
      - Mono mixdown (1964)
        - Fake stereo mixed (1964)
    - Edited (spoken word by McCartney superimposed over the intro) and stereo mixed (1990s) – released on Anthology 1 (2:42)
- "My Bonnie" (German intro) with Tony Sheridan
  - Stereo mixed
    - Mono mixdown – released on as a single on 23 October 1961 (Germany)
- "The Saints" (trad. arr. Sheridan) with Tony Sheridan
  - Stereo mixed
    - Mono mixdow – released as the B-side to "My Bonnie"
      - Fake stereo mixed (1964)
- "Why (Can't You Love Me Again)" (Sheridan) with Tony Sheridan
  - Stereo mixed
    - Mono mixdown
      - Fake stereo mixed (1964)
- "Nobody's Child" (Coben–Foree) with Tony Sheridan
  - Stereo mixed
    - Mono mixdown
      - Edited (1964)
        - Fake stereo mixed (1964)
- "Take Out Some Insurance on Me, Baby" (Hall–Singleton) with Tony Sheridan
  - Stereo mixed
    - Mono mixdown
      - Edited, extra instruments added and mono mixed (1964)
        - Fake stereo mixed (1964)
- "Ain't She Sweet" (Ager–Yellen)
  - Stereo mixed
    - Mono mixdown
      - Extra drums added and mono mixed (1964) – released on Anthology 1 (2:13)
        - Fake stereo mixed (1964)
- "Cry for a Shadow" (Lennon–Harrison)
  - Stereo mixed – released on Anthology 1 (2:22)
    - Mono mixdown
      - Fake stereo mixed (1964)

Personnel

Musicians:

- Pete Best – drums
- George Harrison – backing vocals, lead guitar
- John Lennon – vocals, rhythm guitar
- Paul McCartney – backing vocals, bass guitar
- Tony Sheridan – vocals, lead guitar

Production staff:

- Bert Kaempfert – producer
- Karl Hinze – engineer

== 1962 ==
=== Decca Audition ===
==== 1 January 1962 ====
On New Year's Day, the Beatles recorded an audition for Decca Records in London at around 11am. They likely performed only one take of each song with no overdubbing. The Beatles did not pass the audition, but their manager, Brian Epstein, kept the reel-to-reel tapes to present to other record producers. Epstein arranged for the recordings to be pressed onto monoacetate discs, one of which was later heard by Parlophone producer George Martin, who offered them an audition which would turn out to be successful. The likely order of the songs was:

Recordings

- "Like Dreamers Do" – released on Anthology 1 (2:35)
- "Money (That's What I Want)" (Bradford–Gordy) (2:22)
- "Till There Was You" (Willson) (2:58)
- "The Sheik of Araby" (Smith–Wheeler–Snyder) – released on Anthology 1 (1:43)
- "To Know Her Is to Love Her" (Spector) (2:35)
- "Take Good Care of My Baby" (Goffin–King) (2:26)
- "Memphis, Tennessee" (Berry) (2:20)
- "Sure to Fall (In Love with You)" (Cantrell–Claunch–Perkins) (2:01)
- "Hello Little Girl" – released on Anthology 1 (1:40)
- "Three Cool Cats" (Leiber–Stoller) – released on Anthology 1 (2:25)
- "Crying, Waiting, Hoping" (Holly) (2:01)
- "Love of the Loved" (1:50)
- "September in the Rain" (Dubin–Warren) (1:54)
- "Bésame Mucho" (Velázquez/Skylar) (2:38)
- "Searchin'" (Leiber–Stoller) – released on Anthology 1 (3:00)

Personnel

Musicians:

- Pete Best – drums
- George Harrison – vocals, lead guitar
- John Lennon – vocals, rhythm guitar
- Paul McCartney – vocals, bass guitar

Production staff:

- Mike Smith – producer

=== 2nd Tony Sheridan Recordings ===
==== 24 May 1962 ====
After their previous sessions recording in Hamburg with Tony Sheridan for Bert Kaempfert, the Beatles returned for one final session to complete their contract. Only one song from this day has survived. The Beatles were accompanied by Roy Young, a pianist who had been playing with them at the Star-Club. Sheridan was not at the session, and he overdubbed his vocals on 7 June 1962 without the Beatles present. He re-recorded his vocals for "Sweet Georgia Brown" on 3 January 1964 to contain a reference to the Beatles' fame. Atlantic Records added extra instruments for a release in 1964.

Recordings

- "Sweet Georgia Brown" (Bernie–Pinkard–Casey, arr. McCartney)
  - Vocal overdub by Sheridan (7 June 1962)
    - Stereo mixed
      - Mono mixdown
  - Vocal overdub by Sheridan (3 January 1964)
    - Stereo mixed (1964)
      - Mono mixdown (1964)
        - Extra instruments added and mono mixed (1964)
          - Fake stereo mixed (1964)
- "Swanee River" (Foster) – lost

Personnel

Musicians:

- Pete Best – drums
- George Harrison – backing vocals, guitar
- John Lennon – backing vocals, rhythm guitar
- Paul McCartney – backing vocals, bass guitar
- Roy Young – piano

Production staff:

- Bert Kaempfert – producer

=== EMI Artist Test ===
==== 6 June 1962 ====
After the Decca audition recordings came to the attention of EMI managers through the efforts of the Beatles' manager Brian Epstein, a recording contract was executed between Epstein and EMI's Parlophone record label. EMI would record a minimum of six single "sides" and the agreement would start on 6 June 1962, expiring a year later, but renewable. After the contract was signed, Parlophone record producer George Martin gave the Beatles an audition at EMI Studios in London, to assess their musical quality and respective vocal talents. The audition, held on 6 June, also acted as their first EMI recording session. They likely performed in Studio 2, the studio in which they would record most of their music. Because none of the recordings was considered worthy of release, the session tapes were destroyed per standard protocol; however, at least two mono recordings have since been discovered. Most documentation from the session has also been destroyed; however, it is known that four songs were recorded in an unknown number of takes. Ken Townsend, who would become a regular at the Beatles' recording sessions, was on duty in the technical department that day. Martin was not satisfied with Best's drumming, so Epstein and the other Beatles soon dismissed him from the group. This session was Best's only recording session at EMI before he was replaced by Ringo Starr. A complete tape of this session surfaced after the death of sound engineer Geoff Emerick on 2 October 2018. Apparently Emerick took the tape home even though it was meant to have been destroyed. As of 2020 Emerick's family are involved in legal proceedings with Universal Music, current owners of the Beatles' back catalogue, as to who legally owns the tape.

Recordings

6–8pm

- "Bésame Mucho" (Velázquez/Skylar) (take 1) – destroyed
  - Mono mixed (take 2)
    - Edited (1980s) – released on Anthology 1 (2:37)
- "Love Me Do" (takes 1–3) – destroyed
  - Mono mixed (take 4) – released on Anthology 1 (2:32)
- "P.S. I Love You" (take 1–5) – destroyed
- "Ask Me Why" (take 1) – destroyed

Personnel

Musicians:

- Pete Best – drums
- George Harrison – backing vocals, guitar
- John Lennon – vocals, harmonica, rhythm guitar
- Paul McCartney – vocals, bass guitar

Production staff:

- George Martin – producer
- Ron Richards – producer
- Norman Smith – balance engineer
- Chris Neal – second engineer (tape operator)

=== "Love Me Do" single sessions ===
==== 4 September 1962 ====
90 days after their EMI audition, the Beatles returned to EMI Studios, with their new drummer, Ringo Starr, to record their debut single in Studio 2. Before the session, they rehearsed five songs, including "Please Please Me", in Studio 3 with Ron Richards, between 2.30 and 5.30pm. They began work on Mitch Murray's "How Do You Do It", which Martin had chosen for them, but they disliked the song and wanted to release an original composition. They recorded at least two takes of "How Do You Do It" and at least 15 takes of "Love Me Do", then the best take of each song was mono mixed and pressed onto an acetate disc for Martin and Epstein to listen to. The session tapes were later destroyed, as was common practice until 1963. This session's version of "Love Me Do" was released as the Beatles' first single; however, it was later replaced with a version recorded seven days later, and the original was destroyed. When the original was later released on compilations, it had to be sourced from an original mono 45 rpm single.

Recordings

7–10pm

- "How Do You Do It" (Murray) – destroyed
  - Mono mixed (from take 2)
    - Edited (1980s) – released on Anthology 1 (1:57)
- "Love Me Do" – destroyed
  - Mono mixed (from an unknown take) – released as a single on 5 October 1962; included on Past Masters (2:25) and Mono Masters (2:25)

Personnel

Musicians:

- George Harrison – acoustic and lead guitar, backing vocals
- John Lennon – harmonica, rhythm guitar, vocals
- Paul McCartney – bass guitar, vocals
- Ringo Starr – drums

Production staff:

- George Martin – producer
- Norman Smith – engineer

==== 11 September 1962 ====
Concerned with Ringo's drumming, the producers hired session drummer Andy White for another attempt at recording the Beatles' first single. In Studio 2, they recorded three songs with White drumming, while Ringo was relegated to maracas and tambourine. The best takes of "Love Me Do" and "P.S. I Love You" were mono mixed. An unknown amount of takes of "Please Please Me" were also recorded but none was used. The session tapes were later destroyed, thus there are no true stereo versions of the songs, although at least one mono recording has been discovered. Although the previous session's version of "Love Me Do" was originally released as the single, following the release of the EP The Beatles' Hits, it was replaced with the version from this session, and the original was destroyed. "Love Me Do" and "P.S. I Love You" were mixed in "fake stereo" on 25 February 1963 in the control room of Studio 1. Although they were originally released in fake stereo on the stereo version of Please Please Me, modern remastered stereo releases contain the two songs in mono, as fake stereo has fallen out of style.

Recordings

10am – 1pm

- "P.S. I Love You" (takes 1–9) – destroyed
- "P.S. I Love You" (take 10) – destroyed
  - Mono mixed – released as the B-side to "Love Me Do"; included on Please Please Me (mono) (2:04)
    - Fake stereo mixed (25 February 1963) – released on Please Please Me (stereo)
- "Love Me Do" (takes 1–17) – destroyed
- "Love Me Do" (take 18) – destroyed
  - Mono mixed – released on Please Please Me (mono) (2:21)
    - Fake stereo mixed (25 February 1963) – released on Please Please Me (stereo)
- "Please Please Me" (unknown number of takes) – destroyed
  - Mono mixed (from an unknown take) – released on Anthology 1 (1:59)

Personnel

Musicians:

- George Harrison – acoustic and lead guitar, backing vocals
- John Lennon – rhythm guitar, vocals, harmonica
- Paul McCartney – bass guitar, vocals
- Ringo Starr – maracas, tambourine
- Andy White – percussion, drums

Production staff:

- Ron Richards – producer
- Norman Smith – engineer

=== "Please Please Me" single sessions ===
On 26 November, over a month after the release of the first single, the Beatles returned to Studio 2 to record their second. After the successful recording of "Please Please Me", Martin spoke the now-famous line, "You've just made your first number one." In addition to the two sides of the single, they also performed an unknown number of takes of another original composition, "Tip of My Tongue", but Martin was unhappy with the arrangement. They never recorded it again and, instead, gave it to Tommy Quickly, another artist managed by Epstein. "Please Please Me" and "Ask Me Why" were mono mixed at an unknown time on 30 November in Studio 2. An edit and stereo mix of "Please Please Me" and a new mono and a stereo mix of "Ask Me Why" were made on 25 February 1963 in Studio 1, for inclusion on the mono and stereo versions of the Please Please Me album.

==== 26 November 1962 ====
Recordings

7–10pm

- "Please Please Me" (takes 1–18) – destroyed
  - Mono mixed (from an unknown take) (30 November 1962) – released as a single on 11 January 1963; included on Please Please Me (mono) (2:03)
  - Edit of takes 16, 17 & 18 (25 February 1963)
    - Stereo mixed (25 February 1963) – released on Please Please Me (stereo) (2:01)
- "Ask Me Why" (takes 1–5) – destroyed
- "Ask Me Why" (take 6) – destroyed
  - Mono mixed (30 November 1962) – released as the B-side to "Please Please Me"
  - Mono mixed (25 February 1963) – released on Please Please Me (mono) (2:28)
  - Stereo mixed (25 February 1963) – released on Please Please Me (stereo) (2:27)
- "Tip of My Tongue" (unknown number of takes) – destroyed

Personnel

Musicians:

- George Harrison – backing vocals, lead guitar
- John Lennon – rhythm guitar, vocals, harmonica
- Paul McCartney – bass guitar, vocals
- Ringo Starr – drums

Production staff:

- George Martin – producer
- Norman Smith – engineer

==== 30 November 1962 ====
Personnel

Production staff:

- George Martin – producer
- Norman Smith – engineer

== 1963 ==
=== Please Please Me album sessions ===
On 11 February in Studio 2, the Beatles recorded almost the entirety of their debut album, Please Please Me, between 10am and 10.45pm. They also recorded several takes of "Hold Me Tight". Although in 1963, the convention of destroying session tapes after the final mixes were made had mostly ceased, the session's takes of "Hold Me Tight" were destroyed, as the song was left unused until seven months later when they re-recorded it for their next album. On 20 February in Studio 1, Martin recorded overdubs for "Misery" and "Baby It's You". The album was edited and mixed on 25 February in Studio 1. The song "Seventeen" was later retitled "I Saw Her Standing There".

==== 11 February 1963 ====
Recordings

10am – 1pm

- "There's a Place" (take 1) – complete (1:58)
- "There's a Place" (take 2) – complete (1:54)
- "There's a Place" (take 3) – false start
- "There's a Place" (take 4) – complete (1:50)
- "There's a Place" (take 5) – false start – released on The Beatles Bootleg Recordings 1963 (with take 6) (2:19)
- "There's a Place" (take 6) – complete (1:57) – released on The Beatles Bootleg Recordings 1963 (with take 5) (2:19)
- "There's a Place" (take 7) – false start
- "There's a Place" (take 8) – complete (1:57) – released on The Beatles Bootleg Recordings 1963 (1:58)
- "There's a Place" (take 9) – complete (1:53) – released on The Beatles Bootleg Recordings 1963 (2:03)
- "There's a Place" (take 10) – complete (1:50)
  - Harmonica overdub (take 11) – complete (2.30–6pm)
  - Harmonica overdub (take 12) – false start (2.30–6pm)
  - Harmonica overdub (take 13) – complete (2.30–6pm)
    - Mono mixed (25 February 1963) – released on Please Please Me (mono) (1:54)
    - Stereo mixed (25 February 1963) – released on Please Please Me (stereo) (1:50)
- "Seventeen" (take 1) – complete (2:50)
  - Handclaps overdub (take 11) – false start (2.30–6pm)
  - Handclaps overdub (take 12) – complete (2.30–6pm)
    - Edit of takes 9 and 12 (25 February 1963)
      - Mono mixed (25 February 1963) – released on Please Please Me (mono) (2:58)
      - Stereo mixed (25 February 1963) – released on Please Please Me (stereo) (2:52)
- "Seventeen" (take 2) – complete (2:49) – released on The Beatles Bootleg Recordings 1963 (3:07)
- "Seventeen" (take 3) – edit piece (0:23)
- "Seventeen" (takes 4–5) – edit pieces (0:37)
- "Seventeen" (takes 6–8) – false starts
- "Seventeen" (take 9) – complete (2:45) – released as a B-side to "Free as a Bird" (2:51)
  - Handclaps overdub (take 10) – complete (2.30–6pm)
  - Edit of takes 9 and 12 (see take 12 above)

2.30–6pm

- "A Taste of Honey" (Marlow–Scott) (take 1) – complete (2:00)
- "A Taste of Honey" (takes 2–3) – break-downs (1:00)
- "A Taste of Honey" (take 4) – complete (2:02)
- "A Taste of Honey" (take 5) – complete (2:00)
  - Lead vocal double tracking overdub (take 6) – complete – released on The Beatles Bootleg Recordings 1963 (2:12)
  - Lead vocal double tracking overdub (take 7) – complete
    - Mono mixed (25 February 1963) – released on Please Please Me (mono) (2:06)
    - Stereo mixed (25 February 1963) – released on Please Please Me (stereo) (2:03)
- "Do You Want to Know a Secret" (take 1) – false start
- "Do You Want to Know a Secret" (takes 2–4) – complete (1:55)
- "Do You Want to Know a Secret" (takes 5) – false start
- "Do You Want to Know a Secret" (takes 6) – complete (2:00)
  - Harmony vocal and drumsticks overdub (take 7) – complete – released on The Beatles Bootleg Recordings 1963 (2:16)
  - Harmony vocal and drumsticks overdub (take 8) – complete
    - Mono mixed (25 February 1963) – released on Please Please Me (mono) (2:01)
    - Stereo mixed (25 February 1963) – released on Please Please Me (stereo) (1:57)
- "Misery" (take 1) – complete – released on The Beatles Bootleg Recordings 1963 (1:54)
- "Misery" (takes 2–5) – false starts
- "Misery" (take 6) – complete (1:42)
- "Misery" (take 7) – complete (1:44) – released on The Beatles Bootleg Recordings 1963 (1:56)
- "Misery" (takes 8–10) – false starts
- "Misery" (take 11) – complete (1:44)
  - Piano overdub (takes 12–15) (20 February 1963)
  - Piano overdub (take 16) (20 February 1963)
    - Mono mixed (25 February 1963)
    - Stereo mixed (25 February 1963)
    - Mono mixed (25 February 1963) – released on Please Please Me (mono) (1:53)
    - Stereo mixed (25 February 1963) – released on Please Please Me (stereo) (1:48)

7.30–10.45pm

- "Hold Me Tight" (take 1) – false start – destroyed
- "Hold Me Tight" (take 2) – complete (1:48) – destroyed
- "Hold Me Tight" (takes 3–4) – false start – destroyed
- "Hold Me Tight" (take 5) – break-down – destroyed
- "Hold Me Tight" (take 6) – complete (2:28) – destroyed
- "Hold Me Tight" (takes 7–8) – false starts – destroyed
- "Hold Me Tight" (take 9) – complete (1:26) – destroyed
- "Hold Me Tight" (take 10) – edit piece – destroyed
- "Hold Me Tight" (take 11) – edit piece, false start – destroyed
- "Hold Me Tight" (takes 12–13) – edit pieces – destroyed
- "Anna (Go to Him)" (Alexander) (takes 1–2) – false starts
- "Anna (Go to Him)" (take 3) – complete
  - Mono mixed (25 February 1963) – released on Please Please Me (mono) (3:00)
  - Stereo mixed (25 February 1963) – released on Please Please Me (stereo) (2:57)
- "Boys" (Dixon–Farrell) (take 1) – complete
  - Mono mixed (25 February 1963) – released on Please Please Me (mono) (2:29)
  - Stereo mixed (25 February 1963) – released on Please Please Me (stereo) (2:26)
- "Chains" (Goffin–King) (take 1)
  - Mono mixed (25 February 1963) – released on Please Please Me (mono) (2:29)
  - Stereo mixed (25 February 1963) – released on Please Please Me (stereo) (2:25)
- "Chains" (takes 2–3) – false starts
- "Chains" (takes 4) – complete
- "Baby It's You" (Bacharach–Williams–David) (take 1) – complete
- "Baby It's You" (take 2) – false start
- "Baby It's You" (take 3) – complete
  - Celesta overdub (take 4) (20 February 1963)
  - Celesta overdub (take 5) (20 February 1963)
    - Stereo mixed (25 February 1963) – released on Please Please Me (stereo) (2:40)
    - Mono mixed (25 February 1963) – released on Please Please Me (mono) (2:42)
  - Piano overdub (take 6) (20 February 1963)
- "Twist and Shout" (Medley–Russell) (take 1) – complete
  - Mono mixed (25 February 1963) – released on Please Please Me (mono) (2:36)
  - Stereo mixed (25 February 1963) – released on Please Please Me (stereo) (2:33)
- "Twist and Shout" (take 2) – complete

Personnel

Musicians:

- George Harrison – guitar, vocals, handclaps
- John Lennon – guitar, vocals, harmonica, handclaps
- Paul McCartney – bass guitar, vocals, handclaps
- Ringo Starr – drums, handclaps, vocals

Production staff:

- George Martin – producer
- Norman Smith – engineer
- Richard Langham – second engineer

==== 20 February 1963 ====
10.30am – 1pm

Personnel

Musicians:

- George Martin – piano, celesta

Production staff:

- George Martin – producer
- Stuart Eltham – engineer
- Geoff Emerick – second engineer

==== 25 February 1963 ====
10am – 1pm, 2.30–5.45pm

Personnel

Production staff:

- George Martin – producer
- Norman Smith – engineer
- A. B. Lincoln – second engineer

=== "From Me to You" single sessions ===
The Beatles recorded their third single on 5 March in Studio 2. They also wanted to record "What Goes On" and "The One After 909" (later retitled "One After 909"). In the end, only the latter was recorded, but the song remained unused until it was re-recorded during the Get Back / Let It Be sessions. "What Goes On" was later recorded for Rubber Soul. On 13 March in Studio 2, Lennon recorded a harmonica overdub for "Thank You Little Girl" (later retitled "Thank You Girl"), the single's B-side, and the song was edited and mixed. The A-side, "From Me to You", was edited and mixed on 14 March in Studio 2.

==== 5 March 1963 ====
Recordings

2.30–5pm

- "From Me to You" (takes 1–2) – released on The Beatles Bootleg Recordings 1963 (3:24)
- "From Me to You" (takes 3–4)
- "From Me to You" (take 5) – released on The Beatles Bootleg Recordings 1963 (2:16)
- "From Me to You" (takes 6–7)
- "From Me to You" (takes 8–13) – edit pieces (harmonica, the guitar solo and the harmonised introduction)
  - Edit (of unknown takes) (14 March 1963)
    - Mono mixed (14 March 1963) – released as a single on 11 April 1963; included on Mono Masters (1:57)
    - Stereo mixed (14 March 1963) – released on Past Masters (1:57)
- "Thank You Little Girl" (take 1) – released on The Beatles Bootleg Recordings 1963 (2:09)
- "Thank You Little Girl" (takes 2–4)
- "Thank You Little Girl" (take 5) – released on The Beatles Bootleg Recordings 1963 (2:04)
- "Thank You Little Girl" (take 6)
- "Thank You Little Girl" (takes 7–13) – edit pieces (guitar flourish at the end)
  - Edit of takes 6, 13, 17, 20, 21 and 23 (see 13 March 1963 below)

7–10pm

- "The One After 909" (takes 1–2) – released on The Beatles Bootleg Recordings 1963 (4:28)
- "The One After 909" (takes 3–4)
- "The One After 909" (take 5) – edit piece
  - Edit of takes 3, 4 and 5, mono mixed (1990s) – released on Anthology 1 as "One After 909 (False Starts)" (2:23)
  - Edit of takes 4 and 5, mono mixed (1990s) – released on Anthology 1 as "One After 909 (Complete)" (2:55)

Personnel

Musicians:

- George Harrison – harmony vocals, lead guitar
- John Lennon – rhythm guitar, vocals, harmonica
- Paul McCartney – bass guitar, vocals
- Ringo Starr – drums

Production staff:

- George Martin – producer
- Norman Smith – engineer
- Richard Langham – second engineer

==== 13 March 1963 ====
Recordings

10am – 1pm

- "Thank You Little Girl" (takes 14–28) – harmonica overdubs
  - Edit of takes 6, 13, 17, 20, 21 and 23
    - Mono mixed – released as the B-side to "From Me to You"; included on Mono Masters (2:04)
    - Stereo mixed – released on Past Masters (2:03)

Personnel

Musicians:

- John Lennon – harmonica

Production staff:

- George Martin – producer
- Norman Smith – engineer
- Geoff Emerick – second engineer

==== 14 March 1963 ====
10am – 1pm

Personnel

Production staff:

- George Martin – producer

=== "She Loves You" single sessions ===
The Beatles recorded their fourth single, "She Loves You", on 1 July in Studio 2. The B-side, "Get You in the End", was later retitled "I'll Get You". The number of takes recorded is unknown, as the documentation and session tapes were later destroyed or lost. The songs were edited and mono mixed on 4 July in Studio 2. No stereo mixes were ever made from the master recordings, and later stereo releases of the songs are in fake stereo or are combined with the recordings made on 13 March 1964 for the German-language version.

==== 1 July 1963 ====
Recordings

2.30–5.30, 7–10pm

- "She Loves You" – destroyed
  - Edited and mono mixed (from unknown takes) (4 July 1963) – released as a single on 23 August 1963; included on Past Masters (2:21) and Mono Masters (2:21)
- "Get You in the End" – destroyed
  - Mono mixed (from an unknown take) (4 July 1963) – released as the B-side to "She Loves You"; included on Past Masters (2:06) and Mono Masters (2:06)

Personnel

Musicians:

- George Harrison – backing vocals, lead guitar, handclaps
- John Lennon – vocals, rhythm guitar, harmonica
- Paul McCartney – vocals, bass guitar, handclaps
- Ringo Starr – drums, handclaps

Production staff:

- George Martin – producer
- Norman Smith – engineer
- Geoff Emerick – second engineer

==== 4 July 1963 ====
10am – 1pm

Personnel

Production staff:

- George Martin – producer

=== With the Beatles and "I Want to Hold Your Hand" single sessions ===
==== 18 July 1963 ====
Studio 2

Recordings

7.00–10.45pm

- "You Really Got a Hold on Me" (Robinson) (takes 1–7)
- "You Really Got a Hold on Me" (takes 8–11) – edit pieces
  - Edit of takes 7, 10 & 11 (21 August 1963)
    - Mono mixed (21 August 1963) – released on With the Beatles (mono) (3:04)
    - Stereo mixed (29 October 1963) – released on With the Beatles (stereo) (3:01)
- "Money (That's What I Want)" (takes 1–6)
- "Money (That's What I Want)" (take 7) – released on The Beatles Bootleg Recordings 1963 (2:47) (the exact take and mix released on the album is unknown)
  - Edit of takes 6 & 7 (21 August 1963)
    - Mono mixed (21 August 1963) – released on With the Beatles (mono) (2:49)
    - Stereo mixed (29 October 1963)
  - Stereo mixed (30 October 1963) – released on With the Beatles (stereo) (2:47)
  - "Money (That's What I Want)" (three unnumbered takes) (30 September 1963 – piano overdubs)
- "Devil in Her Heart" (Drapkin) (takes 1–5)
- "Devil in Her Heart" (take 6)
  - Mono mixed (21 August 1963) – released on With the Beatles (mono) (2:30)
  - Stereo mixed (29 October 1963) – released on With the Beatles (stereo) (2:26)
- "Till There Was You" (Willson) (takes 1–3)

Personnel

Musicians:

- George Harrison – lead guitar
- John Lennon – rhythm guitar, vocals
- George Martin – piano
- Paul McCartney – bass guitar, vocals
- Ringo Starr – maraca, drums

Production staff:

- George Martin – producer
- Norman Smith – engineer
- Richard Langham – second engineer

==== 30 July 1963 ====
Studio 2

Recordings

10.00am – 1.30pm

- "Please Mister Postman" (Dobbins–Garrett–Holland–Bateman–Gorman) (takes 1–8)
- "Please Mister Postman" (take 9)
  - Mono mixed (21 August 1963) – released on With the Beatles (mono) (2:39)
  - Stereo mixed (29 October 1963) – released on With the Beatles (stereo) (2:34)
- "It Won't Be Long" (takes 1–8)
  - "It Won't Be Long" (takes 9–10) – overdubs (ending)

5.00–11.00pm

- "Money (That's What I Want)" (piano test)
- "Money (That's What I Want)" (takes 8–14) – edit pieces (piano for start)
- "Till There Was You" (takes 4–5) – false starts
- "Till There Was You" (take 6) – complete (2:14)
- "Till There Was You" (take 7) – complete (2:13)
- "Till There Was You" (take 8) – complete (2:15)
  - Mono mixed (21 August 1963) – released on With the Beatles (mono) (2:19)
  - Stereo mixed (29 October 1963) – released on With the Beatles (stereo) (2:13)
- "Roll Over Beethoven" (Berry) (take 1) – false start
- "Roll Over Beethoven" (take 2) – complete (2:41)
- "Roll Over Beethoven" (take 3) – false start
- "Roll Over Beethoven" (take 4) – complete (2:44)
- "Roll Over Beethoven" (take 5) – complete (2:37)
  - "Roll Over Beethoven" (take 6) – overdub, false start
  - "Roll Over Beethoven" (take 7) – overdub, complete (2:37)
- "Roll Over Beethoven" (take 8) – edit piece (end guitar riff)
  - Edit of takes 7 & 8 (21 August 1963)
    - Mono mixed (21 August 1963) – released on With the Beatles (mono) (2:49)
    - Stereo mixed (29 October 1963) – released on With the Beatles (stereo) (2:45)
- "It Won't Be Long" (takes 11–13) – false starts
- "It Won't Be Long" (take 14) – complete
- "It Won't Be Long" (takes 15–16) – false starts
- "It Won't Be Long" (take 17) – complete
- "It Won't Be Long" (take 18) – edit piece
- "It Won't Be Long" (take 19) – edit piece, false start
- "It Won't Be Long" (takes 20–23) – edit pieces
  - Edit of takes 17 & 21 (21 August 1963)
    - Mono mixed (21 August 1963) – released on With the Beatles (mono) (2:16)
    - Stereo mixed (29 October 1963) – released on With the Beatles (stereo) (2:12)
- "All My Loving" (take 1) – complete (2:05)
- "All My Loving" (takes 2–3) – false starts
- "All My Loving" (take 4) – complete (2:05)
- "All My Loving" (take 6) – complete (2:08)
- "All My Loving" (take 7) – complete (2:07)
- "All My Loving" (takes 8–9) – false starts
- "All My Loving" (take 10) – complete (2:07)
- "All My Loving" (take 11) – complete
  - "All My Loving" (take 12) – overdub, complete (2:05)
  - "All My Loving" (take 13) – overdub, break-down
  - "All My Loving" (take 14) – overdub, complete (2:05)
    - Mono mixed (21 August 1963) – released on With the Beatles (mono) (2:13)
    - Stereo mixed (29 October 1963) – released on With the Beatles (stereo) (2:07)

Personnel

Musicians:

- George Harrison – lead guitar, vocals
- John Lennon – rhythm guitar, vocals
- Paul McCartney – bass guitar, vocals
- Ringo Starr – bongos, drums

Production staff:

- George Martin – producer
- Norman Smith – engineer
- Richard Langham – second engineer

==== 21 August 1963 ====
Studio 3 (control room)

10.00am–1.00pm, 2.00–5.30pm

Personnel

Production staff:

- George Martin – producer
- Norman Smith – engineer
- Geoff Emerick – second engineer

==== 11 September 1963 ====
Studio 2

Recordings

2.30–6.00pm

- "I Wanna Be Your Man" (take 1)
- "Little Child" (takes 1–2)
- "All I've Got to Do" (takes 1–14)
  - "All I've Got to Do" (take 15) – overdub
    - Mono mixed (30 September 1963) – released on With the Beatles (mono) (2:06)
    - Stereo mixed (29 October 1963) – released on With the Beatles (stereo) (2:02)

7.00–10.15pm

- "Not a Second Time" (takes 1–4)
- "Not a Second Time" (take 5)
  - "Not a Second Time" (takes 6–8) – overdubs (lead vocal double-tracking and piano)
  - "Not a Second Time" (take 9) – overdub (lead vocal double-tracking and piano)
    - Mono mixed (30 September 1963) – released on With the Beatles (mono) (2:12)
    - Stereo mixed (29 October 1963) – released on With the Beatles (stereo) (2:06)
- "Don't Bother Me" (Harrison) (takes 1–7)

Personnel

Musicians:

- George Harrison – lead guitar, vocals
- John Lennon – rhythm guitar, vocals
- George Martin – piano
- Paul McCartney – bass guitar, vocals
- Ringo Starr – drums, vocals

Production staff:

- George Martin – producer
- Norman Smith – engineer
- Richard Langham – second engineer

==== 12 September 1963 ====
Studio 2

Recordings

2.30–6.30pm

- "Messages to Australia" (takes 1–4)
- "Hold Me Tight" (take 20)
- "Hold Me Tight" (take 21) – released on The Beatles Bootleg Recordings 1963 (2:24)
- "Hold Me Tight" (takes 22–29)
  - Edit of takes 26 & 29 (30 September 1963)
    - Mono mixed (30 September 1963)
    - Mono mixed (23 October 1963) – released on With the Beatles (mono) (2:35)
    - Stereo mixed (29 October 1963) – released on With the Beatles (stereo) (2:31)

7.00–11.30pm

- "Don't Bother Me" (takes 10–14)
- "Don't Bother Me" (take 15)
  - Mono mixed (30 September 1963) – released on With the Beatles (mono) (2:31)
  - Stereo mixed (29 October 1963) – released on With the Beatles (stereo) (2:28)
- "Don't Bother Me" (takes 16–19)
- "Little Child" (takes 3–18)
- "Little Child" (take 7)
  - "Little Child" (takes 13–14) – harmonic overdubs
  - "Little Child" (takes 15–17) – piano overdubs
  - "Little Child" (take 18) – harmonic solo overdub
    - Edit of takes 15 & 18 (30 September 1963)
      - Mono mixed (30 September 1963)
      - Mono mixed (23 October 1963) – released on With the Beatles (mono) (1:50)
- "Little Child" (takes 8–12)
- "I Wanna Be Your Man" (takes 2–6)
- "I Wanna Be Your Man" (take 7)
  - "I Wanna Be Your Man" (takes 8–13) (30 September 1963) – Hammond organ overdubs

Personnel

Musicians:

- George Harrison – lead guitar, vocals
- John Lennon – harmonica, rhythm guitar, tambourine, vocals
- Paul McCartney – bass guitar, claves, piano, vocals
- Ringo Starr – Arabian bongos, drums, vocals

Production staff:

- George Martin – producer
- Norman Smith – engineer
- Richard Langham – second engineer

==== 30 September 1963 ====
Studio 2

10.00am – 1.15pm

Personnel

Musicians:

- George Martin – piano, Hammond organ

Production staff:

- George Martin – producer
- Norman Smith – engineer
- Geoff Emerick – second engineer

==== 3 October 1963 ====
Studio 2

Recordings

7.00–10.00pm

- "I Wanna Be Your Man" (takes 14–15)
- "Little Child" (takes 19–20)
- "Little Child" (take 21)
  - Stereo mixed (29 October 1963) – released on With the Beatles (stereo) (1:46)

Personnel

Musicians:

- Ringo Starr – maraca

Production staff:

- George Martin – producer
- Norman Smith – engineer

==== 17 October 1963 ====
Studio 2

Recordings

2.30–5.30, 7.00–10.00pm

- "The Beatles' Christmas Record" (unnumbered takes) – released on 6 December 1963
- "You Really Got a Hold on Me" (take 12)
- "I Want to Hold Your Hand" (takes 1–15)
  - "I Want to Hold Your Hand" (take 16) – overdub
  - "I Want to Hold Your Hand" (take 17) – overdub
    - Mono mixed (21 October 1963) – released as a single on 29 November 1963; included on Mono Masters (2:26)
    - Stereo remix 1 (21 October 1963)
- "This Boy" (takes 1–11)
- "This Boy" (takes 12–13) – released as a B-side to "Free as a Bird" (3:17)
- "This Boy" (take 14)
- "This Boy" (take 15)
  - Mono remixes 1 & 2 (21 October 1963)
    - Edited (21 October 1963) – released as the B-side to "I Want to Hold Your Hand"; included on Mono Masters (2:16)
- "This Boy" (takes 16–17)

Personnel

Musicians:

- George Harrison – lead guitar, vocals
- John Lennon – rhythm guitar, vocals
- Paul McCartney – bass guitar, vocals
- Ringo Starr – drums

Production staff:

- George Martin – producer
- Norman Smith – engineer
- Geoff Emerick – second engineer

==== 21 October 1963 ====
Studio 1

10.00am – 1.00pm

Personnel

Production staff:

- George Martin – producer
- Norman Smith – engineer

==== 23 October 1963 ====
Studio 2

Recordings

10.00am – 1.00pm

- "I Wanna Be Your Man" (take 16)
  - Mono mixed – released on With the Beatles (mono) (2:01)
    - Stereo mixed (29 October 1963) – released on With the Beatles (stereo) (1:59)

Personnel

Musicians:

- George Harrison – lead guitar, vocals
- John Lennon – rhythm guitar, vocals
- Paul McCartney – bass guitar, vocals
- Ringo Starr – drums

Production staff:

- George Martin – producer
- Norman Smith – engineer

==== 29 October 1963 ====
Studio 3

10.00am – 1.00pm

Personnel

Production staff:

- George Martin – producer
- Norman Smith – engineer
- Geoff Emerick – second engineer
- B.T. – second engineer

==== 30 October 1963 ====
Studio 3

2.30–5.30pm

Personnel

Production staff:

- George Martin – producer
- Norman Smith – engineer
- A. B. Lincoln – second engineer

== 1964 ==
=== A Hard Day's Night album and Long Tall Sally EP sessions ===
==== 24 January 1964 ====
Studio One (control room only), EMI Studios, London (10.00am-10.45am)

- Tape copying
  - "I Want to Hold Your Hand" (from take 17)
- Personnel
  - Production staff: Norman Smith (engineer), A.B. Lincoln and Geoff Emerick (2nd engineer)

==== 29 January 1964 ====
Pathé Marconi Studios, Paris (late-morning/afternoon)

- Recording
  - "Komm, Gib Mir Deine Hand" (takes 1–11)
  - "Sie Liebt Dich" (takes 1–14)
  - "Can't Buy Me Love" (takes 1–4)
    - take 2 – released on Anthology 1
- Editing
  - "Komm, Gib Mir Deine Hand" (of takes 5 and 7)
- Personnel
  - Musicians: John Lennon (rhythm guitar, vocals), Paul McCartney (bass guitar, vocals), George Harrison (lead guitar, vocals), Ringo Starr (drums)
  - Production staff: George Martin (producer), Norman Smith (engineer), Jacques Esmenjaud (2nd engineer)

==== 25 February 1964 ====
Studio Two, EMI Studios, London (10.00am-1.00pm)

- Recording
  - "You Can't Do That" (takes 1–9)
    - take 6 – released on Anthology 1

Studio Two, EMI Studios, London (2.30pm-5.30pm)

- Recording
  - "And I Love Her" (takes 1–2)
    - take 2 – released on Anthology 1
  - "I Should Have Known Better" (takes 1–3)
- Personnel
  - Musicians: John Lennon (harmonica, rhythm guitar, vocals), Paul McCartney (bass guitar, cowbell, vocals), George Harrison (12-string guitar, lead guitar, vocals), Ringo Starr (bongos, drums)
  - Production staff: George Martin (producer), Norman Smith (engineer), Richard Langham (2nd engineer)

==== 26 February 1964 ====
Studio Two (control room only), EMI Studios, London (10.00am-1.00pm)

- Mono mixing
  - "You Can't Do That" (remixes 1–4, from take 9)
    - Remix 3 – released as the B-side to "Can't Buy Me Love"; included on A Hard Day's Night (mono)
    - Remixes 2 and 4, for the USA
  - "Can't Buy Me Love" (from take 4) – released as a single; included on A Hard Day's Night (mono)

Studio Two, EMI Studios, London (2.30pm-5.30pm)

- Recording
  - "I Should Have Known Better" [re-make] (takes 4–22)

Studio Two, EMI Studios, London (7.00pm-10.00pm)

- Recording
  - "And I Love Her" [re-make] (takes 3–19)
- Personnel
  - Musicians: John Lennon (harmonica, rhythm guitar, vocals), Paul McCartney (bass guitar, cowbell, vocals), George Harrison (lead guitar), Ringo Starr (claves, bongos, drums)
  - Production staff: George Martin (producer), Norman Smith (engineer), Richard Langham (2nd engineer)

==== 27 February 1964 ====
Studio Two, EMI Studios, London (10.00am-1.00pm)

- Recording
  - "And I Love Her" [re-re-make] (takes 20–21)
  - "Tell Me Why" (takes 1–8)
    - takes 4 & 5 – released on Anthology 4

Studio Two, EMI Studios, London (2.30pm-5.30pm)

- Recording
  - "If I Fell" (takes 1–15)
    - take 11 – released on Anthology 4
- Personnel
  - Musicians: John Lennon (rhythm guitar, vocals), Paul McCartney (bass guitar, vocals), George Harrison (lead guitar), Ringo Starr (drums)
  - Production staff: George Martin (producer), Norman Smith (engineer), Richard Langham (2nd engineer)

==== 1 March 1964 ====
Studio Two, EMI Studios, London (10.00am-1.30pm)

- Recording
  - "I'm Happy Just to Dance with You" (takes 1–4)
  - "Long Tall Sally" (Enotris Johnson/Richard Penniman/Robert Blackwell) (take 1)
  - "I Call Your Name" (takes 1–7)
- Personnel
  - Musicians: John Lennon (rhythm guitar, vocals), Paul McCartney (bass guitar, vocals), George Harrison (lead guitar, vocals), Ringo Starr (cowbell, drums), George Martin (piano)
  - Production staff: George Martin (producer), Norman Smith (engineer), Richard Langham (2nd engineer)

==== 3 March 1964 ====
Studio One (control room only), EMI Studios, London (10.00am-1.45pm)

- Mono mixing
  - "I Should Have Known Better" (from take 22) – released on A Hard Day's Night (mono)
  - "If I Fell" (from take 15) – released on A Hard Day's Night (mono)
  - "Tell Me Why" (from take 8) – released on A Hard Day's Night (mono)
  - "And I Love Her" (remix 1, from take 21) – released on A Hard Day's Night (mono, U. S.)
  - "I'm Happy Just to Dance with You" (from take 4) – released on A Hard Day's Night (mono)
  - "I Call Your Name" (from take 7) – planned to use in A Hard Day's Night (film); not included.
- Personnel
  - Production staff: George Martin (producer), Norman Smith (engineer), A.B. Lincoln (2nd engineer)

==== 4 March 1964 ====
Studio Three (control room only), EMI Studios, London (10.00am-11.00am)

- Mono mixing
  - "I Call Your Name" (from take 7) – released on Long Tall Sally (mono, U. S.)
- Personnel
  - Production staff: George Martin (producer), unknown (engineer)

==== 10 March 1964 ====
Studio Two, EMI Studios, London (10.00am-1.00pm)

- Stereo mixing
  - "Can't Buy Me Love" (from take 4)
  - "Long Tall Sally" (from take 1) – released on Long Tall Sally (stereo, U. S.)
  - "I Call Your Name" (from take 7) – released on Long Tall Sally (stereo, U. S.)
  - "You Can't Do That" (from take 9)
- Mono mixing
  - "Long Tall Sally" (from take 1) – released on Long Tall Sally (mono, U. S.)
  - "Komm, Gib Mir Deine Hand" (from edit of takes 5 and 7) – released as a German single; included on Mono Masters
  - "Sie Liebt Dich" (from take 14) – released as the B-side to "Komm, Gib Mire Deine Hand"; included on Mono Masters
- Personnel
  - Production staff: George Martin (producer), Norman Smith (engineer), unknown (2nd engineer)

==== 12 March 1964 ====
Studio Three (control room only), EMI Studios, London (10.00am-12.00pm)

- Stereo mixing
  - "Komm, Gib Mir Deine Hand" (from edit of takes 5 and 7) – released on Something New (stereo); included on Past Masters
  - "Sie Liebt Dich" (from take 14) – released on Past Masters
- Personnel
  - Production staff: George Martin (producer), Norman Smith (engineer)

==== 16 April 1964 ====
Studio Two, EMI Studios, London (10.00am-1.00pm)

- Recording
  - "A Hard Day's Night" (takes 1–9)
    - take 1 – released on Anthology 1
- Personnel
  - Musicians: John Lennon (acoustic guitar, vocals), Paul McCartney (bass guitar, vocals), George Harrison (lead guitar), Ringo Starr (bongos, drums), George Martin (piano)
  - Production staff: George Martin (producer), Norman Smith (engineer), Geoff Emerick (2nd engineer)

==== 20 April 1964 ====
Studio Two (control room only), EMI Studios, London (2.00pm-3.15pm)

- Mono mixing
  - "A Hard Day's Night" (remix test, from take 9)
- Stereo mixing
  - "A Hard Day's Night" (remix test, from take 9)
- Personnel
  - Production staff: George Martin (producer), Norman Smith (engineer), A.B. Lincoln (2nd engineer)

==== 23 April 1964 ====
Studio Two (control room only), EMI Studios, London (4.30pm-5.45pm)

- Mono mixing
  - "A Hard Day's Night" (remix "10", from take 9) – released as a single; included on A Hard Day's Night (mono)
- Personnel
  - Production staff: George Martin (producer), Norman Smith (engineer), David Lloyd (2nd engineer)

==== 22 May 1964 ====
Studio Two, EMI Studios, London (10.00am-11.00am)

- Recording
  - "You Can't Do That" (overdub onto take 10)
- Personnel
  - Musicians: George Martin (piano)
  - Production staff: George Martin (producer), Norman Smith (engineer), A.B. Lincoln and B.T. (2nd engineer)

==== 1 June 1964 ====
Studio Two, EMI Studios, London (2.30pm-5.30pm)

- Recording
  - "Matchbox" (Carl Perkins) (takes 1–5)
    - take 1 – released on Anthology 4
  - "I'll Cry Instead" (Section A) (takes 1–6)
  - "I'll Cry Instead" (Section B) (takes 7–8)
  - "Slow Down" (Larry Williams) (takes 1–6)

Studio Two, EMI Studios, London (7.00pm-10.00pm)

- Recording
  - "I'll Be Back" (takes 1–16)
    - takes 2 and 3 – released on Anthology 1
- Personnel
  - Musicians: John Lennon (rhythm guitar, vocals), Paul McCartney (bass guitar, vocals), George Harrison (lead guitar), Ringo Starr (drums, vocals)
  - Production staff: George Martin (producer), Norman Smith (engineer), Ken Scott (2nd engineer)

==== 2 June 1964 ====
Studio Two, EMI Studios, London (2.30pm-5.30pm)

- Recording
  - "Any Time at All" (takes 1–7)
  - "Things We Said Today" (takes 1–3)

Studio Two, EMI Studios, London (7.00pm-10.00pm)

- Recording
  - "When I Get Home" (takes 1–11)
  - "Any Time at All" (takes 8–11)
- Personnel
  - Musicians: John Lennon (piano, rhythm guitar, vocals), Paul McCartney (bass guitar, vocals), George Harrison (lead guitar), Ringo Starr (tambourine, drums)
  - Production staff: George Martin (producer), Norman Smith (engineer), Ken Scott (2nd engineer)

==== 3 June 1964 ====
Studio Two, EMI Studios, London

- Recording
  - "You Know What to Do" (Harrison) (Studio Demo) – released on Anthology 1
  - "You're My World" (Bindi, Paoli, Sigman) (Studio Jam)
  - "No Reply" (Demo Take 1) – released on Anthology 1
- Personnel
  - Musicians: John Lennon (rhythm guitar, tambourine, vocals), Paul McCartney (bass guitar, vocals), George Harrison (lead guitar, vocals), Unknown (drums)
  - Production staff: George Martin (producer), Norman Smith (engineer)

==== 4 June 1964 ====
Studio Two, EMI Studios, London (2.30pm-7.00pm)

- Mono mixing
  - "Long Tall Sally" (from take 1) – released on Long Tall Sally; included on Mono Masters
  - "Matchbox" (from take 5) – released on Long Tall Sally; included on Mono Masters
  - "I Call Your Name" (remixes 1 and 2, from takes 5 and 7)
- Editing
  - "I Call Your Name" (of mono remixes 1 and 2) – released on Long Tall Sally; included on Mono Masters
- Recording
  - "Slow Down" (overdub onto take 6)
- Mono mixing
  - "Slow Down" (from take 6) – released on Long Tall Sally; included on Mono Masters
  - "When I Get Home" (remix 1, from take 11)
  - "Any Time at All" (remix 1, from take 11)
  - "I'll Cry Instead" (Section A) (from take 6)
  - "I'll Cry Instead" (Section B) (from take 8)
- Editing
  - "I'll Cry Instead" (of mono remixes of takes 6 and 8) – released on A Hard Day's Night (mono, U. S.)
- Personnel
  - Musicians: George Martin (piano)
  - Production staff: George Martin (producer), Norman Smith (engineer), Richard Langham (2nd engineer)

==== 9 June 1964 ====
Studio Three (control room only), EMI Studios, London (2.00pm-5.45pm)

- Mono tape copying
  - "I Should Have Know Better"
  - "If I Fell"
  - "Tell Me Why"
  - "And I Love Her"
  - "I'm Happy Just to Dance with You"
  - "I'll Cry Instead"
  - "Can't Buy Me Love"
  - "A Hard Day's Night"
- Mono mixing
  - "A Hard Day's Night" ("remix 3", from take 9) – extended ending remix used in A Hard Day's Night (film)
  - "Things We Said Today" (from take 3) – released as the B-side to "A Hard Day's Night"; included on A Hard Day's Night (mono)
- Personnel
  - Production staff: George Martin (producer), Norman Smith (engineer), Ken Scott (2nd engineer)

==== 10 June 1964 ====
Studio Two (control room only), EMI Studios, London (10.00am-11.00am)

- Mono mixing
  - "I'll Be Back" (remix 1, from take 16)
- Personnel
  - Production staff: George Martin (producer), Norman Smith (engineer), Richard Langham (2nd engineer)

==== 22 June 1964 ====
Studio One (control room only), EMI Studios, London (10.00am-11.30am)

- Mono mixing
  - "Any Time at All" (remix 2, for the UK, from take 11) – released on A Hard Day's Night (mono)
  - "Any Time at All" (remix 3, for the US, from take 11) – released on Something New (mono)
  - "When I Get Home" (remix 2, for the UK, from take 11) – released on A Hard Day's Night (mono)
  - "When I Get Home" (remix 3, for the US, from take 11) – released on Something New (mono)
  - "I'll Be Back" (remix 2, for the UK, from take 16) – released on A Hard Day's Night (mono)
  - "I'll Be Back" (remix 3, for the US, from take 16) – released on Beatles '65 (mono)
  - "And I Love Her" (remix 2, from take 21) – released on A Hard Day's Night (mono)

Studio One (control room only), EMI Studios, London (11.30am-1.00pm)

- Stereo mixing
  - "And I Love Her" (from take 21) – released on A Hard Day's Night (stereo)
  - "When I Get Home" (from take 11) – released on A Hard Day's Night (stereo)
  - "Any Time at All" (from take 11) – released on A Hard Day's Night (stereo)
  - "I'll Be Back" (from take 16) – released on A Hard Day's Night (stereo)
  - "If I Fell" (from take 15) – released on A Hard Day's Night (stereo)
  - "A Hard Day's Night" (from take 9) – released on A Hard Day's Night (stereo)
  - "I Should Have Known Better" (from take 22) – released on A Hard Day's Night (stereo)
  - "I'm Happy Just to Dance with You" (from take 4) – released on A Hard Day's Night (stereo)
  - "I Call Your Name" (remixes 1 and 2, from takes 5 and 7)
- Editing
  - "I Call Your Name" (of stereo remixes 1 and 2) – released on Past Masters

Studio One (control room only), EMI Studios, London (2.30pm-5.30pm)

- Stereo mixing
  - "Can't Buy Me Love" (from take 4) – released on A Hard Day's Night (stereo)
  - "You Can't Do That" (from take 9) – released on A Hard Day's Night (stereo)
  - "Tell Me Why" (from take 8) – released on A Hard Day's Night (stereo)
  - "Things We Said Today" (from take 3) – released on A Hard Day's Night (stereo)
  - "Matchbox" (from take 5) – released on Past Masters
  - "Slow Down" (from take 6) – released on Past Masters
  - "Long Tall Sally" (from take 1) – released on Past Masters
  - "I'll Cry Instead" (Section A) (from take 6)
  - "I'll Cry Instead" (Section B) (from take 8)
- Editing
  - "I'll Cry Instead" (of stereo remixes of takes 6 and 8) – released on A Hard Day's Night (stereo)

Studio Two (control room only), EMI Studios, London (5.45pm-9.00pm)

- Tape copying
  - "Slow Down" (copy of 4 June mono remix)
  - "Matchbox" (copy of 4 June mono remix)
  - "Things We Said Today" (copy of 22 June stereo remix)
- Personnel
  - Production staff: George Martin (producer), Norman Smith (engineer), Geoff Emerick (2nd engineer)

=== Beatles for Sale and "I Feel Fine" single sessions ===
==== 11 August 1964 ====
Studio Two, EMI Studios, London (7.00pm-11.00pm)

- Recording
  - "Baby's in Black" (takes 1–14, and 13 [unnumbered] edit pieces)
- Personnel
  - Musicians: John Lennon (rhythm guitar, vocals), Paul McCartney (bass guitar, vocals), George Harrison (lead guitar), Ringo Starr (drums)
  - Production staff: George Martin (producer), Norman Smith (engineer), Ron Pender (2nd engineer)

==== 14 August 1964 ====
Studio Two, EMI Studios, London (7.00pm-9.00pm)

- Recording
  - "I'm a Loser" (takes 1–8)
  - "Mr. Moonlight" (Roy Lee Johnson) (takes 1–4)
    - Edit of takes 1 and 4 – released on Anthology 1

Studio Two (control room only), EMI Studios, London (9.00pm-10.00pm)

- Mono mixing
  - "I'm a Loser" (remix 1, from take 8)
  - "Baby's in Black" (remix 1, from take 14)

Studio Two, EMI Studios, London (10.00pm-11.15pm)

- Recording
  - "Leave My Kitten Alone" (Little Willie John/Titus Turner/James McDougal) (takes 1–5)
    - Stereo remix of take 5 – released on Anthology 1
- Personnel
  - Musicians: John Lennon (rhythm guitar, vocals), Paul McCartney (bass guitar, piano, vocals), George Harrison (lead guitar), Ringo Starr (drums, tambourine)
  - Production staff: George Martin (producer), Norman Smith (engineer), Ron Pender (2nd engineer)

==== 29 September 1964 ====
Studio Two, EMI Studios, London (2.30pm-6.30pm)

- Recording
  - "Every Little Thing" (takes 1–4)
  - "I Don't Want to Spoil the Party" (takes 1–7)

Studio Two, EMI Studios, London (7.00pm-10.45pm)

- Recording
  - "I Don't Want to Spoil the Party" (takes 8–19)
  - "What You're Doing" (takes 1–7)
- Personnel
  - Musicians: John Lennon (rhythm guitar, vocals), Paul McCartney (bass guitar, vocals), George Harrison (lead guitar), Ringo Starr (drums)
  - Production staff: George Martin (producer), Norman Smith (engineer), Ken Scott and Mike Stone (2nd engineer)

==== 30 September 1964 ====
Studio Two, EMI Studios, London (2.30pm-5.30pm)

- Recording
  - "Every Little Thing" (takes 5–9)
    - takes 6 and 7 – released on Anthology 4

Studio Two, EMI Studios, London (6.30pm-10.30pm)

  - "What You're Doing" (takes 8–12)
  - "No Reply" (takes 2–8)
    - Stereo remix of take 2 – released on Anthology 1
- Personnel
  - Musicians: John Lennon (rhythm guitar, vocals), Paul McCartney (bass guitar, vocals), George Harrison (lead guitar), Ringo Starr (drums)
  - Production staff: George Martin (producer), Norman Smith (engineer), Ken Scott and Mike Stone (2nd engineer)

==== 6 October 1964 ====
Studio Two, EMI Studios, London (3.00pm-6.45pm)

- Recording
  - "Eight Days a Week" (takes 1–6)
    - Edit of takes 1, 2 and 4 – released on Anthology 1 as "Eight Days a Week (Sequence)"
    - Stereo remix of take 5 – released on Anthology 1 as "Eight Days a Week (Complete)"

Studio Two, EMI Studios, London (7.00pm-10.00pm)

- Recording
  - "Eight Days a Week" (takes 7–13)
- Personnel
  - Musicians: John Lennon (rhythm guitar, vocals), Paul McCartney (bass guitar, vocals), George Harrison (lead guitar), Ringo Starr (drums)
  - Production staff: George Martin (producer), Norman Smith (engineer), Ken Scott and Mike Stone (2nd engineer)

==== 8 October 1964 ====
Studio Two, EMI Studios, London (2.30pm-6.00pm)

- Recording
  - "She's a Woman" (takes 1–7)
- Personnel
  - Musicians: John Lennon (rhythm guitar, vocals), Paul McCartney (bass guitar, vocals), George Harrison (lead guitar), Ringo Starr (drums)
  - Production staff: George Martin (producer), Norman Smith (engineer), Ken Scott and Mike Stone (2nd engineer)

==== 12 October 1964 ====
Studio Two (control room only), EMI Studios, London (10.00am-10.30am)

- Mono mixing
  - "She's a Woman" (remix 1, from take 6) – released as the B-side to "I Feel Fine"; included on Mono Masters
- Stereo mixing
  - "She's a Woman" (from take 6) – released on Past Masters

Studio Two (control room only), EMI Studios, London (2.30pm-3.00pm)

- Mono mixing
  - "Eight Days a Week" (remix 1, from take 13)
- Personnel
  - Production staff: George Martin (producer), Norman Smith (engineer), Ken Scott (2nd engineer)

==== 16 October 1964 ====
Studio Two (control room only), EMI Studios, London (2.30pm-5.30pm)

- Mono mixing
  - "No Reply" (remix 1 and 2, from take 8) – remix 1 or 2 released on Beatles for Sale (mono)
- Personnel
  - Production staff: George Martin (producer), Norman Smith (engineer), A.B. Lincoln (2nd engineer)

==== 18 October 1964 ====
Studio Two, EMI Studios, London (2.30pm-11.30pm)

- Recording
  - "Eight Days a Week" (takes 14–15)
  - "Kansas City/Hey-Hey-Hey-Hey!" (Jerry Leiber/Mike Stoller/Richard Penniman) (takes 1–2)
    - Stereo remix of take 2 – released on Anthology 1
  - "Mr. Moonlight" [re-make] (takes 5–8)
  - "I Feel Fine" (takes 1–9)
  - "I'll Follow the Sun" (takes 1–8)
  - "Everybody's Trying to Be My Baby" (Carl Perkins) (take 1)
  - "Rock and Roll Music" (Berry) (take 1)
  - "Words of Love" (Buddy Holly) (takes 1–3)
- Personnel
  - Musicians: John Lennon (rhythm guitar, vocals), Paul McCartney (bass guitar, vocals), George Harrison (lead guitar, vocals), Ringo Starr (drums)
  - Production staff: George Martin (producer), Norman Smith (engineer), Geoff Emerick (2nd engineer)

==== 21 October 1964 ====
Room 65, Abbey Road, London (2.30pm-5.30am)

- Mono mixing
  - "I Feel Fine" (remixes 1–4, from take 9) – remix 3 released as a single; included on Mono Masters
    - Remix 4 – released as a USA single
  - "I'll Follow the Sun" (from take 8) – released on Beatles for Sale (mono)
  - "She's a Woman" (remix 2, from take 6) – released as the B-side to the USA single "I Feel Fine"
  - "Everybody's Trying to Be My Baby" (from take 1) – released on Beatles for Sale (mono)
- Personnel
  - Production staff: George Martin (producer), Norman Smith (engineer), Ron Pender (2nd engineer)

==== 22 October 1964 ====
Studio One (control room only), EMI Studios, London (11.00am-12.00pm)

- Mono mixing
  - "I Feel Fine" (remix 5, from take 9)
- Personnel
  - Production staff: George Martin (producer), Norman Smith (engineer), Ron Pender (2nd engineer)

==== 26 October 1964 ====
Studio Two (control room only), EMI Studios, London (10.00am-12.45pm)

- Mono mixing
  - "I Don't Want to Spoil the Party" (from take 19) – released on Beatles for Sale (mono)
  - "Rock and Roll Music" (from take 1) – released on Beatles for Sale (mono)
  - "Words of Love" (from take 3) – released on Beatles for Sale (mono)
  - "Baby's in Black" (remix 2, from take 14) – released on Beatles for Sale (mono)
  - "I'm a Loser" (remix 2, from take 8) – released on Beatles for Sale (mono)
  - "Kansas City/Hey-Hey-Hey-Hey!" (from take 1) – released on Beatles for Sale (mono)

Studio Two (control room only), EMI Studios, London (12.45pm-1.05pm)

- Stereo mixing
  - "Kansas City/Hey-Hey-Hey-Hey!" (from take 1) – released on Beatles for Sale (stereo)

Studio Two, EMI Studios, London (4.30pm-6.30pm)

- Recording
  - "Honey Don't" (Perkins) (takes 1–5)

Studio Two, EMI Studios, London (7.30pm-10.00pm)

- Recording
  - "What You're Doing" [re-make] (takes 13–19)
  - "Another Beatles Christmas Record" (takes 1–5)
- Editing
  - "Another Beatles Christmas Record" (from takes 1–5)
- Personnel
  - Musicians: John Lennon (rhythm guitar, vocals), Paul McCartney (bass guitar, vocals), George Harrison (lead guitar), Ringo Starr (drums, vocals)
  - Production staff: George Martin (producer), Norman Smith (engineer), Tony Clark and A.B. Lincoln (2nd engineer)

==== 27 October 1964 ====
Studio Two (control room only), EMI Studios, London (10.00am-12.00pm)

- Mono mixing
  - "What You're Doing" (from take 19) – released on Beatles for Sale (mono)
  - "Honey Don't" (from take 5) – released on Beatles for Sale (mono)
  - "Mr. Moonlight" (remixes 1 and 2, from takes 4 and 8)
  - "Every Little Thing" (from take 9) – released on Beatles for Sale (mono)
  - "Eight Days a Week" (remixes 2 and 3, from takes 13 and 15)
- Editing
  - "Mr. Moonlight" (of mono remixes 1 and 2) – released on Beatles for Sale (mono)
  - "Eight Days a Week" (of mono remixes 2 and 3) – released on Beatles for Sale (mono)

Studio Two (control room only), EMI Studios, London (12.30pm-1.00pm)

- Stereo mixing
  - "Eight Days a Week" (remixes 1 and 2, from takes 13 and 15)
  - "Every Little Thing" (from take 9) – released on Beatles for Sale (stereo)
  - "What You're Doing" (from take 19) – released on Beatles for Sale (stereo)
  - "Honey Don't" (from take 5) – released on Beatles for Sale (stereo)
- Editing
  - "Eight Days a Week" (of stereo remixes 1 and 2) – released on Beatles for Sale (stereo)
- Personnel
  - Production staff: George Martin (producer), Norman Smith (engineer), Ken Scott (2nd engineer)

==== 4 November 1964 ====
Studio Two (control room only), EMI Studios, London (10.00am-1.00pm)

- Stereo mixing
  - "I'll Follow the Sun" (from take 8) – released on Beatles for Sale (stereo)
  - "Everybody's Trying to Be My Baby" (from take 1) – released on Beatles for Sale (stereo)
  - "Rock and Roll Music" (from take 1) – released on Beatles for Sale (stereo)
  - "Words of Love" (from take 3) – released on Beatles for Sale (stereo)
  - "Mr. Moonlight" (remixes 1 and 2, from takes 4 and 8)
  - "I Don't Want to Spoil the Party" (from take 19) – released on Beatles for Sale (stereo)
  - "I'm a Loser" (from take 8) – released on Beatles for Sale (stereo)
  - "Baby's in Black" (from take 14) – released on Beatles for Sale (stereo)
  - "No Reply" (from take 8) – released on Beatles for Sale (stereo)
  - "I Feel Fine" (from take 9) – released on A Collection of Beatles Oldies (stereo); included on Past Masters
- Editing
  - "Mr. Moonlight" (of stereo remixes 1 and 2) – released on Beatles for Sale (stereo)
- Personnel
  - Production staff: George Martin (producer), Norman Smith (engineer), Mike Stone (2nd engineer)

== 1965 ==
=== Help! album sessions ===
==== 15 February 1965 ====
Studio Two, EMI Studios, London (2.30pm-5.45pm)

- Recording
  - "Ticket to Ride" (takes 1–2)

Studio Two, EMI Studios, London (7.00pm-10.30pm)

- Recording
  - "Another Girl" (take 1, and 10 [unnumbered] edit pieces)
  - "I Need You" (Harrison) (takes 1–5)
    - take 1 – released on Anthology 4
- Personnel
  - Musicians: John Lennon (rhythm guitar, vocals), Paul McCartney (bass guitar, lead guitar, vocals), George Harrison (lead guitar), Ringo Starr (drums, tambourine)
  - Production staff: George Martin (producer), Norman Smith (engineer), Ken Scott and Jerry Boys (2nd engineer)

==== 16 February 1965 ====
Studio Two, EMI Studios, London (2.30pm-5.00pm)

- Recording
  - "I Need You" (overdub onto take 5)
  - "Another Girl" (overdub onto take 1)

Studio Two, EMI Studios, London (5.00pm-7.00pm)

- Recording
  - "Yes It Is" (takes 1–14)

Studio Two, EMI Studios, London (7.00pm-10.00pm)

- Recording
  - "Yes It Is" (overdub onto take 14)
    - Edit of takes 2 and 14 – released on Anthology 2
- Personnel
  - Musicians: John Lennon (rhythm guitar, vocals), Paul McCartney (bass guitar, vocals), George Harrison (lead guitar, tone pedal guitar), Ringo Starr (cowbell, drums)
  - Production staff: George Martin (producer), Norman Smith (engineer), Ken Scott and Jerry Boys (2nd engineer)

==== 17 February 1965 ====
Studio Two, EMI Studios, London (2.00pm-7.00pm)

- Recording
  - "The Night Before" (takes 1–2)

Studio Two, EMI Studios, London (7.00pm-11.00pm)

- Recording
  - "You Like Me Too Much" (George Harrison) (takes 1–8)
- Personnel
  - Musicians: John Lennon (electric piano, rhythm guitar, vocals), Paul McCartney (bass guitar, piano, vocals), George Harrison (lead guitar, tone pedal guitar), Ringo Starr (cowbell, drums), George Martin (piano)
  - Production staff: George Martin (producer), Norman Smith (engineer), Ken Scott (2nd engineer)

==== 18 February 1965 ====
Studio Two (control room only), EMI Studios, London (10.00am-1.00pm)

- Mono mixing
  - "Ticket to Ride" (remix 1, from take 2) – released as a single; included on Help! (mono)
  - "Another Girl" (from take 1) – released on Help! (mono)
  - "I Need You" (from take 5) – released on Help! (mono)
  - "Yes It Is" (from take 14) – released as the B-side to "Ticket to Ride"; included on Mono Masters

Studio Two, EMI Studios, London (3.30pm-5.15pm)

- Recording
  - "You've Got to Hide Your Love Away" (takes 1–9)
    - Edit of takes 1, 2 and 5 – released on Anthology 2

Studio Two (control room only), EMI Studios, London (5.15pm-6.00pm)

- Mono mixing
  - "The Night Before" (from take 2) – released on Help! (mono)
  - "You Like Me Too Much" (from take 8) – released on Help! (mono)

Studio Two, EMI Studios, London (6.00pm-10.30pm)

- Recording
  - "If You've Got Trouble" (take 1)
    - Stereo mix of take 1 – released on Anthology 2
  - "Tell Me What You See" (takes 1–4)
- Personnel
  - Musicians: John Lennon (rhythm guitar, vocals), Paul McCartney (bass guitar, electric piano, vocals), George Harrison (lead guitar), Ringo Starr (drums, güiro, vocals), Johnnie Scott (flute)
  - Production staff: George Martin (producer), Norman Smith (engineer), Ken Scott (2nd engineer)

==== 19 February 1965 ====
Studio Two, EMI Studios, London (3.30pm-6.20pm)

- Recording
  - "You're Going to Lose That Girl" (Lennon/McCartney) (takes 1–3)
- Personnel
  - Musicians: John Lennon (rhythm guitar, vocals), Paul McCartney (bass guitar, vocals), George Harrison (lead guitar), Ringo Starr (drums)
  - Production staff: George Martin (producer), Norman Smith (engineer), Ken Scott (2nd engineer)

==== 20 February 1965 ====
Studio Two (control room only), EMI Studios, London (11.00am-12.00pm)

- Mono mixing
  - "If You've Got Trouble" (from take 1)
  - "Tell Me What You See" (from take 4) – released on Help! (mono)
  - "You're Going to Lose That Girl" (from take 3) – released on Help! (mono)

Studio Two, EMI Studios, London (12.00pm-5.15pm)

- Recording
  - "That Means a Lot" (Lennon/McCartney) (take 1, tape reduction take 1 into take 2, overdub onto take 2)
    - Stereo mix of take 1 – released on Anthology 2

Studio Two (control room only), EMI Studios, London (5.15pm-6.00pm)

- Mono mixing
  - "That Means a Lot" (from take 1)
  - "You've Got to Hide Your Love Away" (from take 9) – released on Help! (mono)
- Personnel
  - Musicians: John Lennon (rhythm guitar, maracas, vocals), Paul McCartney (bass guitar, piano, vocals), George Harrison (lead guitar, maracas, vocals), Ringo Starr (drums)
  - Production staff: George Martin (producer), Norman Smith (engineer), Ken Scott (2nd engineer)

==== 23 February 1965 ====
Studio Two (control room only), EMI Studios, London (10.00am-1.00pm)

- Stereo mixing
  - "Yes It Is" (from take 14) – released on Past Masters
  - "You've Got to Hide Your Love Away" (from take 9) – released on Help! (stereo)
  - "If You've Got Trouble" (from take 1)
  - "Tell Me What You See" (from take 4) – released on Help! (stereo)
  - "I Need You" (from take 5) – released on Help! (stereo)
  - "Another Girl" (from take 1) – released on Help! (stereo)
  - "Ticket to Ride" (from take 2) – released on Help! (stereo)
  - "You Like Me Too Much" (from take 8) – released on Help! (stereo)
  - "The Night Before" (remix 1, from take 2) – released on Help! (stereo)
  - "You're Going to Lose That Girl" (remix 1, from take 3)
  - "That Means a Lot" (from take 1)
  - "You're Going to Lose That Girl" (remix 2, from take 3) – released on Help! (stereo)
- Personnel
  - Production staff: Norman Smith (engineer), Malcolm Davies (2nd engineer)

==== 15 March 1965 ====
Studio Two (control room only), EMI Studios, London (10.00am-11.00am)

- Mono mixing
  - "Ticket to Ride" (remix 2, from take 2) – used in Help! (film)
- Personnel
  - Production staff: Norman Smith (engineer), unknown (2nd engineer)

==== 30 March 1965 ====
Studio Two, EMI Studios, London (7.00pm-10.00pm)

- Recording
  - "That Means a Lot" [re-make] (takes 20–24)
- Personnel
  - Musicians: John Lennon (rhythm guitar), Paul McCartney (bass guitar, vocals), George Harrison (lead guitar), Ringo Starr (drums)
  - Production staff: George Martin (producer), Norman Smith (engineer), Ron Pender and Vic Gann (2nd engineer)

==== 2 April 1965 ====
Studio Two (control room only), EMI Studios, London (10.00am-11.00am)

- Stereo mixing
  - "You're Going to Lose That Girl" (remix 3, from take 3)
- Personnel
  - Production staff: George Martin (producer), Norman Smith (engineer), unknown (2nd engineer)

==== 13 April 1965 ====
Studio Two, EMI Studios, London (7.00pm-11.00pm)

- Recording
  - "Help!" (Lennon/McCartney) (takes 1–12)
- Personnel
  - Musicians: John Lennon (rhythm guitar, vocals), Paul McCartney (bass guitar, vocals), George Harrison (lead guitar, vocals), Ringo Starr (drums)
  - Production staff: George Martin (producer), Norman Smith (engineer), Ken Scott (2nd engineer)

==== 18 April 1965 ====
Room 65, Abbey Road, London (10.00am-12.30pm)

- Mono mixing
  - "Help!" (remixes 1–3, from take 12) – remix 3 used in Help! (film)
- Stereo mixing
  - "Help!" (remix 1, from take 12) – unused remix
  - "The Night Before" (remix 2, from take 2) – unused remix
- Personnel
  - Production staff: George Martin (producer), Norman Smith (engineer), Phil McDonald (2nd engineer)

==== 10 May 1965 ====
Studio Two, EMI Studios, London (8.00pm-11.30pm)

- Recording
  - "Dizzy Miss Lizzy" (Larry Williams) (takes 1–2)
  - "Bad Boy" (Williams) (takes 1–4)
  - "Dizzy Miss Lizzy" (takes 3–7)

Studio Two (control room only), EMI Studios, London (11.30pm-1.15am)

- Mono mixing
  - "Dizzy Miss Lizzy" (from take 7) – released on Help! (mono)
  - "Bad Boy" (from take 4) – released on A Collection of Beatles Oldies (mono); included on Mono Masters
- Stereo mixing
  - "Dizzy Miss Lizzy" (from take 7) – released on Help! (stereo)
  - "Bad Boy" (from take 4) – released on A Collection of Beatles Oldies (stereo); included on Past Masters
- Personnel
  - Musicians: John Lennon (rhythm guitar, organ, vocals), Paul McCartney (bass guitar, electric piano, vocals), George Harrison (lead guitar), Ringo Starr (drums, tambourine)
  - Production staff: George Martin (producer), Norman Smith (engineer), Ken Scott (2nd engineer)

==== 8 June 1965 ====
Studio One (control room only), EMI Studios, London (10.00am-10.30am)

- Stereo mixing
  - "I Want to Hold Your Hand" (Lennon/McCartney) (remix 2, from take 17) – unused remix
- Personnel
  - Production staff: Norman Smith (engineer), Ron Pender (2nd engineer)

==== 14 June 1965 ====
Studio Two, EMI Studios, London (2.30pm-5.30pm)

- Recording
  - "I've Just Seen a Face" (Lennon/McCartney) (takes 1–6)
    - take 3 - released on Anthology 4
  - "I'm Down" (Lennon/McCartney) (takes 1–7)
    - take 1 – released on Anthology 2

Studio Two, EMI Studios, London (7.00pm-10.00pm)

- Recording
  - "Yesterday" (Lennon/McCartney) (takes 1–2)
    - take 1 – released on Anthology 2
- Personnel
  - Musicians: John Lennon (rhythm guitar, organ, vocals), Paul McCartney (acoustic guitar, bass guitar, vocals), George Harrison (lead guitar, vocals), Ringo Starr (bongos, drums, maracas)
  - Production staff: George Martin (producer), Norman Smith (engineer), Phil McDonald (2nd engineer)

==== 15 June 1965 ====
Studio Two, EMI Studios, London (2.30pm-5.30pm)

- Recording
  - "It's Only Love" (Lennon/McCartney) (takes 1–6)
    - Edit of takes 2 and 3 – released on Anthology 2
- Personnel
  - Musicians: John Lennon (acoustic guitar, vocals), Paul McCartney (bass guitar), George Harrison (tone pedal guitar), Ringo Starr (drums)
  - Production staff: George Martin (producer), Norman Smith (engineer), Phil McDonald (2nd engineer)

==== 17 June 1965 ====
Studio Two, EMI Studios, London (2.30pm-5.30pm)

- Recording
  - "Act Naturally" (Johnny Russell / Vani Morrison) (takes 1–13)

Studio Two, EMI Studios, London (7.00pm-10.00pm)

- Recording
  - "Wait" (Lennon/McCartney) (takes 1–3)
    - take 3 – released on Rubber Soul: Special Edition
  - "Yesterday" (overdub onto take 2)
- Mono mixing
  - "Yesterday" (remixes 1 and 2, from take 2) – remix 2 released on Help! (mono)
- Personnel
  - Musicians: John Lennon (rhythm guitar, vocals), Paul McCartney (bass guitar, vocals), George Harrison (acoustic guitar, lead guitar), Ringo Starr (drums, vocals), Tony Gilbert and Sidney Sax (violin), Francisco Gabarró (cello), Kenneth Essex (viola)
  - Production staff: George Martin (producer), Norman Smith (engineer), Phil McDonald (2nd engineer)

==== 18 June 1965 ====
Studio Two (control room only), EMI Studios, London (10.00am-12.30pm)

- Mono mixing
  - "I've Just Seen a Face" (from take 6) – released on Help! (mono)
  - "I'm Down" (from take 7) – released as the B-side to "Help!"; included on Mono Masters
  - "It's Only Love" (from take 6) – released on Help! (mono)
  - "Act Naturally" (from take 13) – released on Help! (mono)
  - "Wait" (remix 1, from take 4)
  - "Help!" (remix 4, from take 12) – released as a single; included on Help! (mono)

Studio Two (control room only), EMI Studios, London (12.30pm-1.30pm)

- Stereo mixing
  - "I've Just Seen a Face" (from take 6) – released on Help! (stereo)
  - "I'm Down" (from take 7) – released on Past Masters
  - "Yesterday" (from take 2) – released on Help! (stereo)
  - "It's Only Love" (from take 6) – released on Help! (stereo)
  - "Act Naturally" (from take 13) – released on Help! (stereo)
  - "Help!" (remix 2, from take 12) – released on Help! (stereo)
- Personnel
  - Production staff: George Martin (producer), Norman Smith (engineer), Phil McDonald (2nd engineer)

=== Rubber Soul and "Day Tripper"/"We Can Work It Out" sessions ===
==== 12 October 1965 ====
Studio Two, EMI Studios, London (2.30pm-7.00pm)

- Recording
  - "Run for Your Life" (takes 1–5)
- takes 1-5 / instrumental – released on Rubber Soul: Special Edition

Studio Two, EMI Studios, London (7.00pm-11.30pm)

- Recording
  - "This Bird Has Flown" (working title of "Norwegian Wood (This Bird Has Flown)") (Lennon/McCartney) (take 1) – released on Anthology 2
- Personnel
  - Musicians: John Lennon (acoustic guitar, vocals), Paul McCartney (bass guitar, vocals), George Harrison (lead guitar, sitar), Ringo Starr (drums, finger cymbals, maracas, tambourine)
  - Production staff: George Martin (producer), Norman Smith (engineer), Ken Scott and Phil McDonald (2nd engineer)

==== 13 October 1965 ====
Studio Two, EMI Studios, London (7.00pm-12.15am)

- Recording
  - "Drive My Car" (Lennon/McCartney) (takes 1–4)
- takes 1-2 / instrumental – released on Rubber Soul: Special Edition
- Personnel
  - Musicians: John Lennon (rhythm guitar, vocals), Paul McCartney (bass guitar, piano?, vocals), George Harrison (lead guitar, vocals), Ringo Starr (cowbell, drums)
  - Production staff: George Martin (producer), Norman Smith (engineer), Ken Scott (2nd engineer)

==== 16 October 1965 ====
Studio Two, EMI Studios, London (2.30pm-7.00pm)

- Recording
  - "Day Tripper" (Lennon/McCartney) (takes 1–3)
- takes 1-3 / instrumental – released on Rubber Soul: Special Edition

Studio Two, EMI Studios, London (7.00pm-12.00pm)

- Recording
  - "Day Tripper" (overdub onto take 3)
  - "If I Needed Someone" (Harrison) (take 1)
- take 1 / instrumental – released on Rubber Soul: Special Edition
- Personnel
  - Musicians: John Lennon (rhythm guitar, vocals), Paul McCartney (bass guitar, vocals), George Harrison (lead guitar), Ringo Starr (drums)
  - Production staff: George Martin (producer), Norman Smith (engineer), Ken Scott (2nd engineer)

==== 18 October 1965 ====
Studio Two, EMI Studios, London (2.30pm-5.45pm)

- Recording
  - "If I Needed Someone" (overdub onto take 1)
  - "In My Life" (Lennon/McCartney) (takes 1–3)
    - take 1 - released on Anthology 4
- Personnel
  - Musicians: John Lennon (rhythm guitar, vocals), Paul McCartney (bass guitar, vocals), George Harrison (lead guitar, vocals), Ringo Starr (drums, tambourine)
  - Production staff: George Martin (producer), Norman Smith (engineer), Ken Scott (2nd engineer)

==== 20 October 1965 ====
Studio Two, EMI Studios, London (2.30pm-6.30pm)

- Recording
  - "We Can Work It Out" (Lennon/McCartney) (takes 1–2)
- take 1 / instrumental – released on Rubber Soul: Special Edition

Studio Two, EMI Studios, London (7.00pm-11.46pm)

- Recording
  - "We Can Work It Out" (overdub onto take 2)
- Personnel
  - Musicians: John Lennon (harmonium, rhythm guitar, vocals), Paul McCartney (bass guitar, vocals), George Harrison (lead guitar, vocals), Ringo Starr (drums, tambourine)
  - Production staff: George Martin (producer), Norman Smith (engineer), Ken Scott (2nd engineer)

==== 21 October 1965 ====
Studio Two, EMI Studios, London (2.30pm-7.00pm)

- Recording
  - "Norwegian Wood (This Bird Has Flown)" [re-make] (takes 2–4)
- takes 2-3 / instrumental – released on Rubber Soul: Special Edition

Studio Two, EMI Studios, London (7.00pm-12.00pm)

- Recording
  - "Nowhere Man" (Lennon/McCartney) (takes 1–2)
    - take 2 - released on Anthology 4
- Personnel
  - Musicians: John Lennon (rhythm guitar, vocals), Paul McCartney (bass guitar, vocals), George Harrison (sitar), Ringo Starr (tambourine)
  - Production staff: George Martin (producer), Norman Smith (engineer), Ken Scott (2nd engineer)

==== 22 October 1965 ====
Studio Two, EMI Studios, London (10.30am-11.30am)

- Recording
  - "In My Life" (overdub onto take 3)

Studio Two, EMI Studios, London (2.30pm-7.00pm)

- Recording
  - "Nowhere Man" [re-make] (takes 3–5)
- take 5 / instrumental – released on Rubber Soul: Special Edition

Studio Two, EMI Studios, London (7.00pm-11.30pm)

- Recording
  - "Nowhere Man" (overdub onto take 4)
- Personnel
  - Musicians: John Lennon (rhythm guitar, vocals), Paul McCartney (bass guitar, vocals), George Harrison (lead guitar, vocals), Ringo Starr (drums), George Martin (piano)
  - Production staff: George Martin (producer), Stuart Eltham and Norman Smith (engineer), Mike Stone and Ken Scott (2nd engineer)

==== 24 October 1965 ====
Studio Two, EMI Studios, London (2.30pm-7.00pm)

- Recording
  - "I'm Looking Through You" (Lennon/McCartney) (take 1)

Studio Two, EMI Studios, London (7.00pm-11.30pm)

- Recording
  - "I'm Looking Through You" (overdub onto take 1) – released on Anthology 2
- Personnel
  - Musicians: John Lennon (rhythm guitar, vocals), Paul McCartney (bass guitar, organ?, vocals), George Harrison (lead guitar, vocals), Ringo Starr (maracas)
  - Production staff: George Martin (producer), Norman Smith (engineer), Ken Scott (2nd engineer)

==== 25 October 1965 ====
Studio Two (control room only), EMI Studios, London (10.00am-1.00pm)

- Mono mixing
  - "Drive My Car" (from take 4) – released on Rubber Soul (mono)
  - "In My Life" (from take 3) – released on Rubber Soul (mono)
  - "If I Needed Someone" (from take 1) – released on Rubber Soul (mono)
  - "Day Tripper" (remix 1, from take 3)
  - "Norwegian Wood (This Bird Has Flown)" (from take 4) – released on Rubber Soul (mono)
  - "Nowhere Man" (from take 4) – released on Rubber Soul (mono)
- Personnel
  - Production staff: George Martin (producer), Norman Smith (engineer), Ken Scott (2nd engineer)

==== 26 October 1965 ====
Studio Two (control room only), EMI Studios, London (10.00am-12.30pm)

- Stereo mixing
  - "Drive My Car" (from take 4) – released on Rubber Soul (stereo)
  - "Day Tripper" (remix 1, from take 3) – released on Yesterday and Today (stereo)
  - "In My Life" (from take 3) – released on Rubber Soul (stereo)
  - "If I Needed Someone" (from take 1) – released on Rubber Soul (stereo)
  - "Norwegian Wood (This Bird Has Flown)" (from take 4) – released on Rubber Soul (stereo)
  - "Nowhere Man" (from take 4) – released on Rubber Soul (stereo)
- Personnel
  - Production staff: George Martin (producer), Norman Smith (engineer), Ron Pender (2nd engineer)

==== 28 October 1965 ====
Studio Two (control room only), EMI Studios, London (5.00pm-5.30pm)

- Mono mixing
  - "We Can Work It Out" (remix 1, from take 2)
- Personnel
  - Production staff: George Martin (producer), Norman Smith (engineer), Jerry Boys (2nd engineer)

==== 29 October 1965 ====
Studio Two, EMI Studios, London (2.00pm-4.00pm)

- Recording
  - "We Can Work It Out" (overdub onto take 2)

Studio Two (control room only), EMI Studios, London (4.00pm-5.00pm)

- Mono mixing
  - "We Can Work It Out" (remixes 2 and 3, from take 2) – remix 2 released as a double A-sided single with "Day Tripper"; included on Mono Masters
  - "Day Tripper" (remixes 2 and 3, from take 3) – remix 2 released as a double A-sided single with "We Can Work It Out"; included on Mono Masters
- Personnel
  - Musicians: John Lennon (vocals), Paul McCartney (vocals)
  - Production staff: George Martin (producer), Norman Smith (engineer), Ken Scott (2nd engineer)

==== 3 November 1965 ====
Studio Two, EMI Studios, London (2.30pm-7.00pm)

- Recording
  - "Michelle" (Lennon/McCartney) (take 1)
    - take 1 – released on Rubber Soul: Special Edition

Studio Two, EMI Studios, London (7.00pm-11.30pm)

- Recording
  - "Michelle" (tape reduction take 1 into take 2, overdub onto take 2)
- Personnel
  - Musicians: John Lennon (rhythm guitar, vocals), Paul McCartney (bass guitar, vocals), George Harrison (lead guitar), Ringo Starr (drums)
  - Production staff: George Martin (producer), Norman Smith (engineer), Ken Scott (2nd engineer)

==== 4 November 1965 ====
Studio Two, EMI Studios, London (11.00pm-3.30am)

- Recording
  - "What Goes On" (Lennon/McCartney/Richard Starkey) (take 1)
- take 1 / instrumental – released on Rubber Soul: Special Edition
- "12-Bar Original" (Lennon/McCartney/Harrison/Starkey) (takes 1–2)
  - edit of take 2 – released on Anthology 2
- Personnel
  - Musicians: John Lennon (lead guitar, rhythm guitar, vocals), Paul McCartney (bass guitar, vocals), George Harrison (lead guitar, tone pedal guitar), Ringo Starr (drums), George Martin (harmonium)
  - Production staff: George Martin (producer), Norman Smith (engineer), Ken Scott and Graham Platt (2nd engineer)

==== 6 November 1965 ====
Studio Two, EMI Studios, London (7.00pm-1.00am)

- Recording
  - "I'm Looking Through You" [re-make] (takes 2–3)
- takes 2-3 – released on Rubber Soul: Special Edition
- Personnel
  - Musicians: John Lennon (rhythm guitar), Paul McCartney (bass guitar), George Harrison (lead guitar), Ringo Starr (drums)
  - Production staff: George Martin (producer), Norman Smith (engineer), Ken Scott (2nd engineer)

==== 8 November 1965 ====
Studio Two, EMI Studios, London (9.00pm-3.00am)

- Recording
  - "Beatle Speech" (take 1)
- take 1 – released on Rubber Soul: Special Edition
  - "Won't Be There with You" (working title of "Think for Yourself") (take 1)
  - "The Beatles' Third Christmas Record" (takes 1–3)
- Personnel
  - Musicians: John Lennon (rhythm guitar), Paul McCartney (bass guitar, fuzz bass guitar, vocals), George Harrison (lead guitar, vocals), Ringo Starr (drums)
  - Production staff: George Martin (producer), Norman Smith (engineer), Ken Scott (2nd engineer)

==== 9 November 1965 ====
Room 65, Abbey Road, London (2.30pm-5.30pm)

- Editing
  - "The Beatles' Third Christmas Record" (of takes 1–3)
- Mono mixing
  - "Michelle" (remix 1, from take 2) – released on Rubber Soul (mono, U. S.)
  - "What Goes On" (from take 1) – released on Rubber Soul (mono)
  - "Run for Your Life" (from take 5) – released on Rubber Soul (mono)
  - "Think for Yourself" (from take 1) – released on Rubber Soul (mono)
  - "The Beatles' Third Christmas Record" (from edit of takes 1–3)
- Stereo mixing
  - "Think for Yourself" (from take 1) – released on Rubber Soul (stereo)
  - "Michelle" (remix 1, from take 2) – released on Rubber Soul (stereo)
  - "What Goes On" (from take 1) – released on Rubber Soul (stereo)
- Personnel
  - Production staff: George Martin (producer), Norman Smith (engineer), Jerry Boys (2nd engineer)

==== 10 November 1965 ====
Room 65, Abbey Road, London (2.30pm-5.30pm)

- Stereo mixing
  - "Run for Your Life" (from take 5) – released on Rubber Soul (stereo)
  - "We Can Work It Out" (from take 2) – released on Yesterday and Today (stereo)

Studio Two, EMI Studios, London (9.00pm-4.00am)

- Recording
  - "The Word" (Lennon/McCartney) (takes 1–3)
- takes 1-2 / instrumental – released on Rubber Soul: Special Edition
  - "I'm Looking Through You" [re-re-make] (take 4)
- Personnel
  - Musicians: John Lennon (rhythm guitar, vocals), Paul McCartney (bass guitar, piano, vocals), George Harrison (lead guitar, vocals), Ringo Starr (drums), George Martin (harmonium)
  - Production staff: George Martin (producer), Norman Smith (engineer), Jerry Boys and Ken Scott (2nd engineer)

==== 11 November 1965 ====
Room 65, Abbey Road, London (4.00pm-5.30pm)

- Mono mixing
  - "The Word" (from take 3) – released on Rubber Soul (mono)
- Stereo mixing
  - "The Word" (remix 1, from take 3) – released on Rubber Soul (stereo, U. S.)

Studio Two, EMI Studios, London (6.00pm-7.00am)

- Recording
  - "You Won't See Me" (Lennon/McCartney) (takes 1–2)
  - "Girl" (Lennon/McCartney) (takes 1–2)
- take 2 / instrumental – released on Rubber Soul: Special Edition
  - "Wait" (Lennon/McCartney) (overdub onto take 4)
  - "I'm Looking Through You" (overdub onto take 4)
- Personnel
  - Musicians: John Lennon (acoustic and rhythm guitar, vocals), Paul McCartney (bass guitar, piano, vocals), George Harrison (lead guitar, tone pedal guitar, vocals), Ringo Starr (drums), George Martin (harmonium)
  - Production staff: George Martin (producer), Norman Smith (engineer), Mike Stone and Ken Scott (2nd engineer)

==== 15 November 1965 ====
Studio One (control room only), EMI Studios, London (2.30pm-5.30pm)

- Mono mixing
  - "I'm Looking Through You" (from take 4) – released on Rubber Soul (mono)
  - "You Won't See Me" (from take 2) – released on Rubber Soul (mono)
  - "Girl" (from take 2) – released on Rubber Soul (mono)
  - "Wait" (remix 2, from take 4) – released on Rubber Soul (mono)
- Stereo mixing
  - "Wait" (from take 4) – released on Rubber Soul (stereo)
  - "I'm Looking Through You" (from take 4) – released on Rubber Soul (stereo)
  - "You Won't See Me" (from take 2) – released on Rubber Soul (stereo)
  - "Girl" (from take 2) – released on Rubber Soul (stereo)
  - "The Word" (remix 2, from take 3) – released on Rubber Soul (stereo)
- Mono mixing
  - "Michelle" (remix 2, from take 2) – released on Rubber Soul (mono)
- Personnel
  - Production staff: George Martin (producer), Norman Smith (engineer), Richard Lush (2nd engineer)

==== 30 November 1965 ====
Room 65, Abbey Road, London (4.45pm-5.30pm)

- Mono mixing
  - "12-Bar Original" (from take 2)
- Personnel
  - Production staff: Norman Smith (engineer), Ron Pender (2nd engineer)

== 1966 ==
=== Revolver and "Paperback Writer" sessions ===
==== 6 April 1966 ====
Studio Three, EMI Studios, London (8.00pm-1.15am)

- Recording
  - "Mark I" (working title of "Tomorrow Never Knows") (takes 1–3)
    - "Mark I", take 1 – released on Anthology 2
- Personnel
  - Musicians: John Lennon (vocals), Paul McCartney (bass guitar), George Harrison (lead guitar), Ringo Starr (drums)
  - Production staff: George Martin (producer), Geoff Emerick (engineer), Phil McDonald (2nd engineer)

==== 7 April 1966 ====
Studio Three, EMI Studios, London (2.30pm-7.15pm)

- Recording
  - "Mark I" (working title of "Tomorrow Never Knows") (overdub onto take 3)

Studio Three, EMI Studios, London (8.15pm-1.30am)

- Recording
  - "Got to Get You into My Life" (Lennon/McCartney) (takes 1–5)
    - take 5 – released on Anthology 2
- Personnel
  - Musicians: John Lennon (rhythm guitar, vocals), Paul McCartney (bass guitar, vocals), George Harrison (lead guitar, vocals), Ringo Starr (drums), George Martin (organ)
  - Production staff: George Martin (producer), Geoff Emerick (engineer), Phil McDonald (2nd engineer)

==== 8 April 1966 ====
Studio Two, EMI Studios, London (2.30pm-9.00pm)

- Recording
  - "Got to Get You into My Life" (takes 6–8)
- Personnel
  - Musicians: John Lennon (rhythm guitar, vocals), Paul McCartney (bass guitar, vocals), George Harrison (lead guitar, vocals), Ringo Starr (drums), George Martin (organ)
  - Production staff: George Martin (producer), Geoff Emerick (engineer), Phil McDonald (2nd engineer)

==== 11 April 1966 ====
Studio Two, EMI Studios, London (2.30pm-7.00pm)

- Recording
  - "Got to Get You into My Life" (overdub onto take 8)
  - "Granny Smith" (working title of "Love You To") (Harrison) (takes 1–3)
    - Take 1 – released on Revolver Super Deluxe

Studio Two, EMI Studios, London (8.00pm-12.45am)

- Recording
  - "Granny Smith" (takes 4–6)
    - Unnumbered Rehearsal – released on Revolver Super Deluxe

Studio Two (control room only), EMI Studios, London (12.45am-1.00am)

- Mono mixing
  - "Granny Smith" (remix 1, from take 6)
- Personnel
  - Musicians: Paul McCartney (bass guitar, vocals), George Harrison (acoustic guitar, lead guitar, sitar, vocals), Anil Bhagwat (tabla)
  - Production staff: George Martin (producer), Geoff Emerick (engineer), Phil McDonald (2nd engineer)

==== 13 April 1966 ====
Studio Three, EMI Studios, London (2.30pm-6.30pm)

- Recording
  - "Granny Smith" (tape reduction take 6 into take 7, overdub onto take 7)
    - Take 7 – released on Revolver Super Deluxe
- Mono mixing
  - "Granny Smith" (remixes 1–3, from take 7)
- Editing
  - "Granny Smith" (of mono remixes 1–3) – released on Revolver (mono)

Studio Three, EMI Studios, London (8.00pm-2.30am)

- Recording
  - "Paperback Writer" (Lennon/McCartney) (takes 1–2)
    - Takes 1 & 2 – released on Revolver Super Deluxe
- Personnel
  - Musicians:
    - George Harrison: Vocals, Rhythm Guitar
    - Paul McCartney: Vocals, Lead Guitar
    - Ringo Starr: Tambourine, Drums
    - John Lennon: Tambourine
  - Production staff: George Martin (producer), Geoff Emerick (engineer), Richard Lush (2nd engineer)

==== 14 April 1966 ====
Studio Three, EMI Studios, London (2.30pm-7.30pm)

- Recording
  - "Paperback Writer" (overdub onto take 2)

Studio Three (control room only), EMI Studios, London (7.30pm-8.00pm)

- Mono mixing
  - "Paperback Writer" (remixes 1 and 2, from take 2) – remix 2 released as a single; included on Mono Masters

Studio Three, EMI Studios, London (8.30pm-1.30am)

- Recording
  - "Rain" (Lennon/McCartney) (takes 1–5)
    - Take 5 – released on Revolver Super Deluxe
- Personnel
  - Musicians:
    - Paul McCartney: Backing Vocals, Bass
    - John Lennon: Lead Vocals, Guitar
    - George Harrison: Backing Vocals, Lead Guitar
    - George Martin: Piano, Vox Continental
    - Ringo Starr: Drums
  - Production staff: George Martin (producer), Geoff Emerick (engineer), Phil McDonald (2nd engineer)

==== 16 April 1966 ====
Studio Two, EMI Studios, London (2.30pm-1.30am)

- Recording
  - "Rain" (overdub onto take 5, tape reduction take 5 into take 6, takes 7–8)
- Mono mixing
  - "Rain" (remixes 1–4, from take 7) – remix 3 released as the B-side to "Paperback Writer"; included on Mono Masters
- Personnel
  - Musicians:
    - Paul McCartney: Bass
    - Ringo Starr: Tambourine
    - John Lennon: Backing Vocals
    - George Harrison: Backing Vocals
  - Production staff: George Martin (producer), Geoff Emerick (engineer), Phil McDonald (2nd engineer)

==== 17 April 1966 ====
Studio Two, EMI Studios, London (2.30pm-10.30pm)

- Recording
  - "Doctor Robert" (Lennon/McCartney) (takes 1–7)
    - Take 7 – released on Revolver Super Deluxe
- Personnel
  - Musicians:
    - John Lennon: Rhythm Guitar, Harmonium
    - Paul McCartney: Bass
    - George Harrison: Maracas, Lead Guitar
    - Ringo Starr: Drums
  - Production staff: George Martin (producer), Geoff Emerick (engineer), Phil McDonald (2nd engineer)

==== 19 April 1966 ====
Studio Two, EMI Studios, London (2.30pm-12.00am)

- Recording
  - "Doctor Robert" (overdub onto take 7)
- Mono mixing
  - "Doctor Robert" (remixes 1–3, from take 7)
- Personnel
  - Production staff: George Martin (producer), Geoff Emerick (engineer), Phil McDonald (2nd engineer)

==== 20 April 1966 ====
Studio Two, EMI Studios, London (2.30pm-2.30am)

- Recording
  - "And Your Bird Can Sing" (Lennon/McCartney) (takes 1–2)
    - take 2 – released on Anthology 2
  - "Taxman" (Harrison) (takes 1–4)
- Mono mixing
  - "And Your Bird Can Sing" (remixes 1–5, from take 2)
- Personnel
  - Production staff: George Martin (producer), Geoff Emerick (engineer), Phil McDonald (2nd engineer)

==== 21 April 1966 ====
Studio Two, EMI Studios, London (2.30pm-12.50am)

- Recording
  - "Taxman" (takes 1–11)
    - take 11 – released on Anthology 2
- Personnel
  - Production staff: George Martin (producer), Geoff Emerick (engineer), Phil McDonald (2nd engineer)

==== 22 April 1966 ====
Studio Two, EMI Studios, London (2.30pm-11.30pm)

- Recording
  - "Taxman" (tape reduction take 11 into take 12, overdub onto take 12)
  - "Mark I" (overdub onto take 3)
- Personnel
  - Production staff: George Martin (producer), Geoff Emerick (engineer), Phil McDonald (2nd engineer)

==== 25 April 1966 ====
Room 65, Abbey Road, London (10.00am-11.00am)

- Mono mixing
  - "Got to Get You into My Life" (remixes 1 and 2, from take 8)
    - "Got To Get You Into My Life" (Second version/Unnumbered mix) – released on Revolver Super Deluxe
- Personnel
  - Production staff: Peter Vince (engineer)

==== 26 April 1966 ====
Studio Two, EMI Studios, London (2.30pm-2.45am)

- Recording
  - "And Your Bird Can Sing" [re-make] (takes 3–13, overdub onto take 10)
    - Take 5 – released on Revolver Super Deluxe
- Personnel
  - Production staff: George Martin (producer), Geoff Emerick (engineer), Phil McDonald (2nd engineer)

==== 27 April 1966 ====
Studio Three (control room only), EMI Studios, London (6.00pm-11.30pm)

- Mono mixing
  - "Taxman" (remix 1, from take 12)
  - "And Your Bird Can Sing" (remix 6, from take 10)
  - "Mark I" (remixes 1–9, from take 3) – remix 8 released on Revolver (mono)

Studio Three, EMI Studios, London (11.30pm-3.00am)

- Recording
  - "I'm Only Sleeping" (takes 1–11)
    - Take 5 – released on Revolver Super Deluxe
- Personnel
  - Production staff: George Martin (producer), Geoff Emerick (engineer), Phil McDonald (2nd engineer)

==== 28 April 1966 ====
Studio Two, EMI Studios, London (5.00pm-7.50pm)

- Recording
  - "Eleanor Rigby" (takes 1–14, tape reduction take 14 into take 15)
    - Take 2 – released on Revolver Super Deluxe
    - Take 14 – released on Anthology 2
- Personnel
  - Production staff: George Martin (producer), Geoff Emerick (engineer), Phil McDonald (2nd engineer)

==== 29 April 1966 ====
Studio Three, EMI Studios, London (5.00pm-1.00am)

- Recording
  - "Eleanor Rigby" (overdub onto take 15)
- Mono mixing
  - "Eleanor Rigby" (remixes 1–3, from take 15)
- Recording
  - "I'm Only Sleeping" (overdub onto take 11), Rehearsal, Takes 1–5
    - Rehearsal and Take 1 – released on Anthology 2
    - Take 2 – released on Revolver Super Deluxe
- Personnel
  - Production staff: George Martin (producer), Geoff Emerick (engineer), Phil McDonald (2nd engineer)

==== 5 May 1966 ====
Studio Three, EMI Studios, London (9.30pm-3.00am)

- Recording
  - "I'm Only Sleeping" (overdub onto take 11)
- Personnel
  - Production staff: George Martin (producer), Geoff Emerick (engineer), Phil McDonald (2nd engineer)

==== 6 May 1966 ====
Studio Two, EMI Studios, London (2.30pm-1.00am)

- Recording
  - "I'm Only Sleeping" (overdub onto take 11, tape reduction take 11 into takes 12 and 13)

Studio Two (control room only), EMI Studios, London (1.00am-2.15am)

- Mono mixing
  - "I'm Only Sleeping" (remixes 1–4, from take 13)
    - RM 1 – released on Revolver Super Deluxe
- Personnel
  - Production staff: George Martin (producer), Geoff Emerick (engineer), Phil McDonald (2nd engineer)

==== 9 May 1966 ====
Studio Two, EMI Studios, London (7.00pm-11.00pm)

- Recording
  - "For No One" (Lennon/McCartney) (takes 1–10)
    - Take 10 – released on Revolver Super Deluxe
- Personnel
  - Production staff: George Martin (producer), Geoff Emerick (engineer), Phil McDonald (2nd engineer)

==== 12 May 1966 ====
Studio Three (control room only), EMI Studios, London (1.45pm-3.30pm)

- Mono mixing
  - "Doctor Robert" (remix 4, from take 7)
  - "I'm Only Sleeping" (remix 5, from take 13) – released on Yesterday and Today (mono)
  - "And Your Bird Can Sing" (remixes 7 and 8, from takes 10 and 6)
- Editing
  - "And Your Bird Can Sing" (of mono remixes 7 and 8) – released on Yesterday and Today (mono)
  - "Doctor Robert" (of remix mono 4) – released on Yesterday and Today (mono)
- Personnel
  - Production staff: George Martin (producer), Geoff Emerick (engineer), Jerry Boys (2nd engineer)

==== 16 May 1966 ====
Studio Two, EMI Studios, London (2.30pm-1.30am)

- Recording
  - "Taxman" (overdub onto take 12)
- Tape copying
  - "Granny Smith" (copies of remix mono 3, numbered mono remixes 4 and 5)
- Mono mixing
  - "Taxman" (remixes 2–5, from take 12)
- Recording
  - "For No One" (overdub onto take 10, tape reduction take 10 into takes 13 and 14 [no takes numbered 11 or 12])
- Tape copying
  - "Taxman" (of remix mono 4)
  - "Granny Smith" (of remix mono 5)
  - "Mark I" (of remix mono 8)
- Personnel
  - Production staff: George Martin (producer), Geoff Emerick (engineer), Phil McDonald (2nd engineer)

==== 18 May 1966 ====
Studio Two, EMI Studios, London (2.30pm-2.30am)

- Recording
  - "Got to Get You into My Life" (overdub onto take 8, tape reduction take 8 into takes 9–11)
- Mono mixing
  - "Got to Get You into My Life" (remixes 1 and 2, from take 9)
- Personnel
  - Production staff: George Martin (producer), Geoff Emerick (engineer), Phil McDonald (2nd engineer)

==== 19 May 1966 ====
Studio Three, EMI Studios, London (7.00pm-11.00pm)

- Recording
  - "For No One" (overdub onto take 14)
- Personnel
  - Production staff: George Martin (producer), Geoff Emerick (engineer), Phil McDonald (2nd engineer)

==== 20 May 1966 ====
Studio One (control room only), EMI Studios, London (11.00am-12.30pm)

- Stereo mixing
  - "And Your Bird Can Sing" (remixes 1 and 2, from takes 10 and 6)
  - "Doctor Robert" (remixes 1 and 2, from take 7) – remix 1 released on Yesterday and Today (stereo, since 1973); remix 2 released on Revolver (stereo)
  - "I'm Only Sleeping" (remixes 1 and 2, from take 13)– remix 1 released on Yesterday and Today (stereo, since 1973); remix 2 released on Revolver (stereo)
- Editing
  - "And Your Bird Can Sing" (of stereo remixes 1 and 2) – released on Revolver (stereo)
  - "Doctor Robert" (of stereo remixes 1 and 2)
- Personnel
  - Production staff: George Martin (producer), Geoff Emerick (engineer), Phil McDonald (2nd engineer)

==== 26 May 1966 ====
Studio Three, EMI Studios, London (7.00pm-1.00am)

- Recording
  - "Yellow Submarine" (Lennon/McCartney) (takes 1–4, tape reduction take 4 into take 5)
- Personnel
  - Production staff: Geoff Emerick (engineer), Phil McDonald (2nd engineer)

==== 1 June 1966 ====
Studio Two, EMI Studios, London (2.30pm-2.30am)

- Recording
  - "Yellow Submarine" (overdub onto take 5)
- Personnel
  - Production staff: George Martin (producer), Geoff Emerick (engineer), Phil McDonald (2nd engineer)

==== 2 June 1966 ====
Studio Two, EMI Studios, London (7.00pm-3.30am)

- Recording
  - "Laxton's Superb" (also "I Don't Know", both working titles of "I Want to Tell You") (Harrison) (takes 1–5, overdub onto take 3, tape reduction take 3 into take 4)
    - Take 4 – released on Revolver Super Deluxe
- Mono mixing
  - "Yellow Submarine" (remix 1, from take 5)
- Personnel
  - Production staff: George Martin (producer), Geoff Emerick (engineer), Phil McDonald (2nd engineer)

==== 3 June 1966 ====
Studio Two, EMI Studios, London (7.00pm-2.30am)

- Recording
  - "Laxton's Superb" (also "I Don't Know") (overdub onto take 4)
- Mono mixing
  - "Laxton's Superb" (also "I Don't Know") (remixes 1–4, from take 4) – remix 1 released on Revolver (mono)
  - "Yellow Submarine" (remixes 1–5, from take 5) – remix 5 released on Revolver (mono)
- Personnel
  - Production staff: George Martin (producer), Geoff Emerick (engineer), Phil McDonald (2nd engineer)

==== 6 June 1966 ====
Studio Three (control room only), EMI Studios, London (7.00pm-12.00pm)

- Tape copying
  - "I Want to Tell You" (two copies of remix mono 1, numbered mono remixes 5 and 6)
- Mono mixing
  - "And Your Bird Can Sing" (remixes 9 and 10, from takes 10 and 4)
  - "For No One" (remixes 1–6, from take 14)
  - "I'm Only Sleeping" (remixes 5 and 6, from take 13) – remix 6 released on Revolver (mono)
  - "Tomorrow Never Knows" (remixes 10–12, from take 3)
    - RM 11 – released on Revolver (first pressing); included on Revolver Super Deluxe

Studio Three, EMI Studios, London (12.00pm-1.30am)

- Recording
  - "Eleanor Rigby" (overdub onto take 15)
- Personnel
  - Production staff: George Martin (producer), Geoff Emerick (engineer), Phil McDonald (2nd engineer)

==== 8 June 1966 ====
Studio Two (control room only), EMI Studios, London (1.00pm-2.00pm)

- Editing
  - "And Your Bird Can Sing" (of mono remixes 9 and 10) – released on Revolver (mono)

Studio Two, EMI Studios, London (2.30pm-2.30am)

- Recording
  - "A Good Day's Sunshine" (working title of "Good Day Sunshine") (Lennon/McCartney) (takes 1–3)
- Personnel
  - Production staff: George Martin (producer), Geoff Emerick (engineer), Richard Lush (2nd engineer)

==== 9 June 1966 ====
Studio Two, EMI Studios, London (2.30pm-8.00pm)

- Recording
  - "A Good Day's Sunshine" (overdub onto take 1)
- Mono mixing
  - "A Good Day's Sunshine" (remixes 1–6, from take 1)
- Personnel
  - Production staff: George Martin (producer), Geoff Emerick (engineer), Phil McDonald (2nd engineer)

==== 14 June 1966 ====
Studio Two, EMI Studios, London (7.00pm-2.00am)

- Recording
  - "Here, There and Everywhere" (Lennon/McCartney) (takes 1–4)
- Personnel
  - Production staff: George Martin (producer), Geoff Emerick (engineer), Phil McDonald (2nd engineer)

==== 16 June 1966 ====
Studio Two, EMI Studios, London (7.00pm-3.30am)

- Recording
  - "Here, There and Everywhere" (takes 5–13, tape reduction take 13 into take 14, overdub onto take 14)
    - Take 6 – released on Revolver Super Deluxe
    - Take 7 + 13 – released on Real Love EP
- Personnel
  - Production staff: George Martin (producer), Geoff Emerick (engineer), Phil McDonald (2nd engineer)

==== 17 June 1966 ====
Studio Two, EMI Studios, London (7.00pm-1.30am)

- Recording
  - "Here, There and Everywhere" (overdub onto take 14)
  - "Got to Get You into My Life" (overdub onto take 9)
- Mono mixing
  - "Got to Get You into My Life" (remixes 3–7, from take 9)
  - "Here, There and Everywhere" (remix 1, from take 14)
- Personnel
  - Production staff: George Martin (producer), Geoff Emerick (engineer), Phil McDonald (2nd engineer)

==== 20 June 1966 ====
Studio One (control room only), EMI Studios, London (6.00pm-8.30pm)

- Mono mixing and recording
  - "Got to Get You into My Life" (tape copying of remix 7 into remix 8 with overdub added from take 8) – released on Revolver (mono)
- Personnel
  - Production staff: George Martin (producer), Geoff Emerick (engineer), Phil McDonald (2nd engineer)

==== 21 June 1966 ====
Studio Three (control room only), EMI Studios, London (10.00am-1.00pm)

- Stereo mixing
  - "Granny Smith" (remixes 1–3, from take 7)
- Editing
  - "Granny Smith" (of stereo remixes 1–3) – released on Revolver (stereo)
- Stereo mixing
  - "I Want to Tell You" (remixes 1 and 2, from take 4) – remix 2 released on Revolver (stereo)
  - "Here, There and Everywhere" (remixes 1 and 2, from take 14) – remix 2 released on Revolver (stereo)
- Mono mixing
  - "Here, There and Everywhere" (remixes 2 and 3, from take 14) – remix 3 released on Revolver (mono)

Studio Three (control room only), EMI Studios, London (2.30pm-6.30pm)

- Mono mixing
  - "For No One" (remixes 7 and 8, from take 14) – remix 8 released on Revolver (mono)
  - "Doctor Robert" (remixes 4–6, from take 7)
  - "Taxman" (remixes 5 and 6, from take 12)
- Editing
  - "Dr. Robert" (of remix mono 6) – released on Revolver (mono)
  - "Taxman" (of mono remixes 5 and 6) – released on Revolver (mono)
- Stereo mixing
  - "For No One" (remix 1, from take 14) – released on Revolver (stereo)
  - "Taxman" (remixes 1 and 2, from take 12)
- Editing
  - "Taxman" (of stereo remixes 1 and 2) – released on Revolver (stereo)

Studio Two, EMI Studios, London (7.00pm-3.45am)

- Recording
  - "Untitled" (working title of "She Said She Said") (takes 1–3, tape reduction take 3 into take 4)
    - Take 2 – released on Revolver Super Deluxe
- Mono mixing
  - "She Said She Said" (remixes 1–3, from take 4)
- Personnel
  - Production staff: George Martin (producer), Geoff Emerick (engineer), Phil McDonald (2nd engineer)

==== 22 June 1966 ====
Studio Three (control room only), EMI Studios, London (7.00pm-1.30am)

- Mono mixing
  - "Eleanor Rigby" (remixes 4 and 5, from take 15) – remix 5 released on Revolver (mono)
  - "She Said She Said" (remix 4, from take 4) – released on Revolver (mono)
  - "Good Day Sunshine" (remix 7, from take 1) – released on Revolver (mono)
- Stereo mixing
  - "Eleanor Rigby" (remix 1, from take 15) – released on Revolver (stereo)
  - "She Said She Said" (remix 1, from take 4) – released on Revolver (stereo)
  - "Good Day Sunshine" (remix 1, from take 1) – released on Revolver (stereo)
  - "Yellow Submarine" (remixes 1 and 2, from take 5) – 2 released on Revolver (stereo)
  - "Tomorrow Never Knows" (remixes 1–6, from take 3) – remix 6 released on Revolver (stereo)
  - "Got to Get You into My Life" (remix 1, from take 9) – released on Revolver (stereo)
- Personnel
  - Production staff: George Martin (producer), Geoff Emerick (engineer), Jerry Boys (2nd engineer)

=== A Collection of Beatles Oldies sessions ===
==== 31 October 1966 ====
Studio Two (control room only), EMI Studios, London (2.30pm-4.30pm)

- Stereo mixing
  - "Paperback Writer" (remixes 1–3, from take 2) – remix 3 released on A Collection of Beatles Oldies (stereo); included on Past Masters
- Personnel
  - Production staff: George Martin (producer), Geoff Emerick (engineer), Phil McDonald (2nd engineer)

==== 7 November 1966 ====
Studio Two (control room only), EMI Studios, London (2.30pm-5.30pm)

- Stereo mixing
  - "I Want to Hold Your Hand" (remix 1, from take 17) – released on A Collection of Beatles Oldies (stereo); included on Past Masters
- Personnel
  - Production staff: George Martin (producer), Geoff Emerick (engineer), Mike Stone (2nd engineer)

==== 8 November 1966 ====
Room 53, Abbey Road, London (4.00pm-5.30pm)

- Stereo mixing
  - "She Loves You" (remixes 1 and 2, from single's master tape) – "fake stereo remix" released on A Collection of Beatles Oldies (stereo)
- Personnel
  - Production staff: Geoff Emerick (engineer)

==== 10 November 1966 ====
Room 65, Abbey Road, London (2.00pm-4.30pm)

- Stereo mixing
  - "This Boy" (remixes 1 and 2, from takes 15 and 17)
  - "Day Tripper" (remix 2, from take 3) – released on A Collection of Beatles Oldies (stereo); included on Past Masters
  - "We Can Work It Out" (remix 2, from take 2) – released on A Collection of Beatles Oldies (stereo); included on Past Masters
- Editing
  - "This Boy" (of stereo remixes 1 and 2) – released on Past Masters
- Personnel
  - Production staff: Peter Brown (engineer), Graham Kirkby (2nd engineer)

=== Sgt. Pepper's Lonely Hearts Club Band sessions ===
==== 24 November 1966 ====
Studio Two, EMI Studios, London (7.00pm-2.30am)

- Recording
  - "Strawberry Fields Forever" (take 1) – released with the Sgt. Pepper's Lonely Hearts Club Band 50th anniversary edition
- Personnel
  - Production Staff: George Martin (Producer), Geoff Emerick (Engineer), Phil McDonald (2nd Engineer)

==== 25 November 1966 ====
Studio, Dick James House, 71/75 New Oxford Street, London WCI (time unknown)

- Recording
  - "Pantomime: Everywhere It's Christmas" (takes unknown)
- Personnel
  - Production Staff: George Martin (Producer), N/A (Engineer), Unknown (2nd Engineer)

==== 28 November 1966 ====
Studio Two, EMI Studios, London (7.00pm-1.30am)

- Recording
  - "Strawberry Fields Forever" (takes 2 – 4)
    - take 4 – released with the Sgt. Pepper's Lonely Hearts Club Band 50th anniversary edition
- Mono mixing
  - "Strawberry Fields Forever" (remixes 1–3 from take 4)
- Personnel
  - Production Staff: George Martin (Producer), Geoff Emerick (Engineer), Phil McDonald (2nd Engineer)

==== 29 November 1966 ====
Studio Two, EMI Studios, London (2.30pm-8.00pm)

- Recording
  - "Strawberry Fields Forever" (takes 5–6, tape reduction take 6 into take 7, SI onto take 7)
    - take 7 – released with the Sgt. Pepper's Lonely Hearts Club Band 50th anniversary edition
- Mono mixing
  - "Strawberry Fields Forever" (remixes 1–3 from take 7)
- Personnel
  - Production Staff: George Martin (Producer), Geoff Emerick (Engineer), Phil McDonald (2nd Engineer)

==== 2 December 1966 ====
Room 53, EMI Studios, London (9.00am-12.00am)

- Mono mixing and editing
  - "Pantomime: Everywhere It's Christmas" (from unknown take numbers)
  - Production Staff: Tony Barrow (Producer), Geoff Emerick (Engineer), Phil McDonald (2nd Engineer)

==== 6 December 1966 ====
Studio Two, EMI Studios, London (6.45pm-1.50am)

- Recording
  - "When I'm Sixty-Four" (takes 1 and 2)
    - take 2 – released with the Sgt. Pepper's Lonely Hearts Club Band 50th anniversary edition
- Personnel
  - Production Staff: George Martin (Producer), Geoff Emerick (Engineer), Phil McDonald (2nd Engineer)

==== 8 December 1966 ====
Studio One, EMI Studios, London (2.30pm-5.30pm)

- Recording
  - "When I'm Sixty-Four" (SI onto take 2)
- Personnel
  - Production Staff: Dave Harris/George Martin (Producer), Dave Harris/Geoff Emerick (Engineer), Phil McDonald (2nd Engineer)

Studio Two, EMI Studios, London (7.00pm-3.40am)

- Recording
  - "Strawberry Fields Forever" (re-make takes 9 – 24)
- Editing
  - "Strawberry Fields Forever" (of takes 15 and 24)
- Personnel
  - Production Staff: Dave Harris/George Martin (Producer), Dave Harris/Geoff Emerick (Engineer), Phil McDonald (2nd Engineer)

==== 9 December 1966 ====
Studio Two, EMI Studios, London (2.30pm-10.00pm)

- Recording
  - "Strawberry Fields Forever" (tape reduction from edit of takes 15 and 24 into take 25, SI onto take 25)
- Mono mixing
  - "Strawberry Fields Forever" (remix 4 from take 25)
- Recording
  - "Strawberry Fields Forever" (SI onto take 25)
- Personnel
  - Production Staff: George Martin (Producer), Geoff Emerick (Engineer), Phil McDonald (2nd Engineer)

==== 15 December 1966 ====
Studio Two, EMI Studios, London (2.30pm-12.00pm)

- Recording
  - "Strawberry Fields Forever" (SI onto take 25, tape reduction take 25 into take 26, SI onto take 26)
- Mono mixing
  - "Strawberry Fields Forever" (remixes 5–9 from take 26)
- Personnel
  - Production Staff: George Martin (Producer), Geoff Emerick (Engineer), Phil McDonald (2nd Engineer)

==== 20 December 1966 ====
Studio Two, EMI Studios, London (7.00pm-1.00am)

- Recording
  - "When I'm Sixty-Four" (SI onto take 2, tape reduction take 2 into takes 3 and 4)
- Personnel
  - Production Staff: George Martin (Producer), Geoff Emerick (Engineer), Phil McDonald (2nd Engineer)

==== 21 December 1966 ====
Studio Two, EMI Studios, London (7.00pm-11.45pm)

- Recording
  - "When I'm Sixty-Four" (SI onto take 4)
- Mono mixing
  - "When I'm Sixty-Four" (remixes 1–3 from take 4)
- Recording
  - "Strawberry Fields Forever" (SI onto take 26)
    - take 26 – released with the Sgt. Pepper's Lonely Hearts Club Band 50th anniversary edition
- Personnel
  - Production Staff: George Martin (Producer), Geoff Emerick (Engineer), Phil McDonald (2nd Engineer)

==== 22 December 1966 ====
Studio Two, EMI Studios, London (7.00pm-11.30pm)

- Mono mixing
  - "Strawberry Fields Forever" (remix 10 from take 7 and remix 11 from take 26)
- Editing
  - "Strawberry Fields Forever" (of mono remixes 10 and 11, edit unnumbered remix 12) – released as a single; included on Magical Mystery Tour (mono, U. S.)
- Personnel
  - Production Staff: George Martin (Producer), Geoff Emerick (Engineer), Phil McDonald (2nd Engineer)

==== 29 December 1966 ====
Studio Three (control room only), EMI Studios, London (2.30pm-5.40pm)

- Mono mixing
  - "When I'm Sixty-Four" (remixes 4 – 7 from take 4)
- Tape copying
  - "Strawberry Fields Forever" (of mono remix 12, numbered remix mono 13)
- Stereo mixing
  - "Strawberry Fields Forever" (remix 1 from take 7, remixes 2 and 4 from take 26)
- Editing
  - "Strawberry Fields Forever" (stereo remixes 1 and 2 edited together as remix 3, stereo remixes 1 and 4 edited together as remix 5) – remix 3 included on Magical Mystery Tour (stereo, U. S.)
- Personnel
  - Production Staff: George Martin (Producer), Geoff Emerick (Engineer), Phil McDonald (2nd Engineer)

Studio Two, EMI Studios, London (7.00pm-2.15am)

- Recording
  - "Penny Lane" (takes 1 – 6)
    - take 6 / instrumental – released with the Sgt. Pepper's Lonely Hearts Club Band 50th anniversary edition
- Mono mixing
  - "Penny Lane" (remixes 1 and 2 from take 6)
- Personnel
  - Production Staff: George Martin (Producer), Geoff Emerick (Engineer), Phil McDonald (2nd Engineer)

==== 30 December 1966 ====
Studio Two, EMI Studios, London (7.00pm-3.00am)

- Mono mixing
  - "When I'm Sixty-Four" (remix 8 from take 4) – released on Sgt. Pepper's Lonely Hearts Club Band (mono)
- Tape copying
  - "Strawberry Fields Forever" (of remix mono 12)
- Recording
  - "Penny Lane" (tape reduction take 6 into take 7, SI onto take 7)
- Mono mixing
  - "Penny Lane" (remixes 1 and 2 from take 7)
- Personnel
  - Production Staff: George Martin (Producer), Geoff Emerick (Engineer), Phil McDonald (2nd Engineer)

== 1967 ==
=== Sgt. Pepper's Lonely Hearts Club Band sessions (cont.) ===
==== 2 January 1967 ====
Studio Two (Control Room Only), EMI Studios, London (2.30–4.00pm)

- Tape Copying
  - "When I'm Sixty-Four" (of Remix Mono 8)
  - ""Strawberry Fields Forever" (of Remix Mono 12)
- Personnel
  - Production Staff: George Martin (Producer), Geoff Emerick (Engineer), Phil McDonald (2nd Engineer)

==== 4 January 1967 ====
Studio Two, EMI Studios, London (7.00pm–2.45am)

- Recording
  - "Penny Lane" (SI onto take 7)
- Personnel
  - Production Staff: George Martin (Producer), Geoff Emerick (Engineer), Phil McDonald (2nd Engineer)

==== 5 January 1967 ====
Studio Two, EMI Studios, London (7.00pm–12.15am)

- Recording
  - "Penny Lane" (SI onto take 7)
  - "Untitled" (AKA "Carnival of Light") (Take 1)
- Mono Mixing
  - "Untitled" (AKA "Carnival of Light") (from take 1)
- Personnel
  - Production Staff: George Martin (Producer), Geoff Emerick (Engineer), Phil Mcdonald (2nd Engineer)

==== 6 January 1967 ====
Studio Two, EMI Studios, London (7.00pm–1.00am)

- Recording
  - "Penny Lane" (SI onto take 7, tape reduction take 7 into take 8, SI onto take 8, tape reduction take 8 into take 9)
- Personnel
  - Production Staff: George Martin (Producer), Geoff Emerick (Engineer), Phil McDonald (2nd Engineer)

==== 9 January 1967 ====
Studio Two, EMI Studios, London (7.00pm–1.45am)

- Recording
  - "Penny Lane" (SI onto take 9)
- Mono Mixing
  - "Penny Lane" (Remixes 5 and 6, from take 9)
- Personnel
  - Production Staff: George Martin (Producer), Geoff Emerick (Engineer), Phil McDonald (2nd Engineer)

==== 10 January 1967 ====
Studio Three, EMI Studios, London (7.00pm–1.45am)

- Recording
  - "Penny Lane" (SI onto take 9)
    - Vocal Overdubs and Speech – released with the Sgt. Pepper's Lonely Hearts Club Band 50th anniversary edition
- Personnel
  - Production Staff: George Martin (Producer), Geoff Emerick (Engineer), Phil McDonald (2nd Engineer)

==== 12 January 1967 ====
Studio Three, EMI Studios, London (2.30–11.00pm)

- Recording
  - "Penny Lane" (SI onto take 9)
- Mono Mixing
  - "Penny Lane" (Remixes 7 and 8, from take 9)
- Personnel
  - Production Staff: George Martin (Producer), Geoff Emerick (Engineer), Phil McDonald (2nd Engineer)

==== 17 January 1967 ====
Studio Two, EMI Studios, London (7.00pm–12.30am)

- Recording
  - "Penny Lane" (SI onto take 9)
- Mono Mixing
  - "Penny Lane" (remixes 9–11, from take 9)
    - Remix 11 (called Capitol Records Mono US Promo Mix) – released with the Sgt. Pepper's Lonely Hearts Club Band 50th anniversary edition
- Tape Copying
  - "Penny Lane" (of remix mono 11)
- Personnel
  - Production Staff: George Martin (Producer), Geoff Emerick (Engineer), Phil McDonald (2nd Engineer)

==== 19 January 1967 ====
Studio Two, EMI Studios, London (7.30pm–2.30am)

- Recording
  - "In the Life Of..." (working title of "A Day in the Life") (Takes 1–4)
    - take 1 – released with the Sgt. Pepper's Lonely Hearts Club Band 50th anniversary edition
    - take 2 – released with the Sgt. Pepper's Lonely Hearts Club Band 50th anniversary edition
- Personnel
  - Production Staff: George Martin (Producer), Geoff Emerick (Engineer), Phil McDonald (2nd Engineer)

==== 20 January 1967 ====
Studio Two, EMI Studios, London (7.00pm–1.10am)

- Recording
  - "A Day in the Life" (tape reduction take 4 into takes 5–7, SI onto take 6)
- Personnel
  - Production Staff: George Martin (Producer), Geoff Emerick (Engineer), Phil McDonald (2nd Engineer)

==== 25 January 1967 ====
Studio One (Control Room Only), EMI Studios, London (6.30–8.30pm)

- Mono Mixing
  - "Penny Lane" (Remixes 12–14, from take 9) remix 14 released as a single; included on Magical Mystery Tour (mono, U. S.)

Studio One (Control Room Only)
9.00–10.00pm

- Tape Copying
  - "Penny Lane" (of Remix Mono 14)
- Personnel
  - Production Staff: George Martin (Producer), Geoff Emerick (Engineer), Phil McDonald (2nd Engineer)

==== 30 January 1967 ====
Studio Three (Control Room Only), EMI Studios, London (7.00–8.30pm)

- Mono Mixing
  - "A Day in the Life" (Remix 1, from take 6)
    - RM 1 – released with the Sgt. Pepper's Lonely Hearts Club Band 50th anniversary edition
- Personnel
  - Production Staff: George Martin (Producer), Geoff Emerick (Engineer), Richard Lush (2nd Engineer)

==== 1 February 1967 ====
Studio Two, EMI Studios, London (7.00pm–2.30am)

- Recording
  - "Sgt. Pepper's Lonely Hearts Club Band" (Takes 1–9)
    - take 1 / instrumental – released with the Sgt. Pepper's Lonely Hearts Club Band 50th anniversary edition
    - take 9 – released with the Sgt. Pepper's Lonely Hearts Club Band 50th anniversary edition
- Personnel
  - Production Staff: George Martin (Producer), Geoff Emerick (Engineer), Richard Lush (2nd Engineer)

==== 2 February 1967 ====
Studio Two, EMI Studios, London (7.00pm–1.45am)

- Recording
  - "Sgt. Pepper's Lonely Hearts Club Band" (SI onto take 9 into take 10)
- Mono Mixing
  - "Sgt. Pepper's Lonely Hearts Club Band" (Remix 1, from take 10)
- Personnel
  - Production Staff: George Martin (Producer), Geoff Emerick (Engineer), Richard Lush (2nd Engineer)

==== 3 February 1967 ====
Studio Two, EMI Studios, London (7.00pm–1.15am)

- Recording
  - "A Day in the Life" (SI onto take 6)
- Personnel
  - Production Staff: George Martin (Producer), Geoff Emerick (Engineer), Richard Lush (2nd Engineer)

==== 8 February 1967 ====
Studio Two, EMI Studios, London (7.00pm–2.15am)

- Recording
  - "Good Morning Good Morning" (Takes 1–8)
    - take 1 / instrumental breakdown – released with the Sgt. Pepper's Lonely Hearts Club Band 50th anniversary edition
    - take 8 – released with the Sgt. Pepper's Lonely Hearts Club Band 50th anniversary edition
- Personnel
  - Production Staff: George Martin (Producer), Geoff Emerick (Engineer), Richard Lush (2nd Engineer)

==== 9 February 1967 ====
Regent Sound Studio, 164–166 Tottenham Court Road, London WI (Time unknown)

- Recording
  - "Fixing a Hole" (Takes 1–3)
    - take 1 – released with the Sgt. Pepper's Lonely Hearts Club Band 50th anniversary edition
    - Speech and take 3 – released with the Sgt. Pepper's Lonely Hearts Club Band 50th anniversary edition
  - Production Staff: George Martin (Producer), Adrian Ibbetson (Engineer), 2nd Engineer Unknown

==== 10 February 1967 ====
Studio One, EMI Studios, London (8.00pm–1.00am)

- Recording
  - "A Day in the Life" (tape reduction take 6 into take 7, SI onto take 7, reduction of take 7 with SI onto take 6, edit piece takes 8–11)
    - Orchestra overdub – released with the Sgt. Pepper's Lonely Hearts Club Band 50th anniversary edition
    - Hummed last chord / takes 8, 9, 10 and 11 – released with the Sgt. Pepper's Lonely Hearts Club Band 50th anniversary edition
- Personnel
  - Production Staff: George Martin (Producer), Geoff Emerick (Engineer), Richard Lush (2nd Engineer)

==== 13 February 1967 ====
Studio Two, EMI Studios, London (7.00pm–3.30am)

- Mono Mixing
  - "A Day in the Life" (Remixes 2–5, from take 7)
- Recording
  - "Not Known" (working title of "Only a Northern Song") (Takes 1–9)
- Personnel
  - Production Staff: George Martin (Producer), Geoff Emerick (Engineer), Richard Lush (2nd Engineer)

==== 14 February 1967 ====
Studio Two, EMI Studios, London (7.00pm–12.30am)

- Recording
  - "Only a Northern Song" (Tape Reduction take 3 into takes 10–12, SI onto take 12)
    - Edit of takes 3 & 12 – released on Anthology 2
- Mono Mixing
  - "Only a Northern Song" (Remixes 1–3, from take 12)
- Personnel
  - Production Staff: George Martin (Producer), Geoff Emerick (Engineer), Richard Lush (2nd Engineer)

==== 16 February 1967 ====
Studio Three, EMI Studios, London (7.00pm–1.45am)

- Recording
  - "Good Morning Good Morning" (SI onto take 8, Tape Reduction take 8 into takes 9 and 10)
    - take 8 with Overdubs – released on Anthology 2
- Mono Mixing
  - "Good Morning Good Morning" (Remix 1, from take 8)
- Personnel
  - Production Staff: George Martin (Producer), Geoff Emerick (Engineer), Richard Lush (2nd Engineer)

==== 17 February 1967 ====
Studio Two, EMI Studios, London (7.00pm–3.00am)

- Recording
  - "Being for the Benefit of Mr. Kite!" (Takes 1–7, Tape Reduction take 7 into takes 8 and 9, SI onto take 9)
    - takes 1 & 2 – released on Anthology 2
    - Speech from before take 1 / take 4 and speech at end – released with the Sgt. Pepper's Lonely Hearts Club Band 50th anniversary edition
    - take 7 – released with the Sgt. Pepper's Lonely Hearts Club Band 50th anniversary edition
- Mono Mixing
  - "Being for the Benefit of Mr. Kite!" (Remix 1 from take 9)
- Personnel
  - Production Staff: George Martin (Producer), Geoff Emerick (Engineer), Richard Lush (2nd Engineer)

==== 20 February 1967 ====
Studio Three, EMI Studios, London (7.00pm–2.15am)

- Recording
  - "Being for the Benefit of Mr. Kite!" (Unnumbered take)
- Mono Mixing
  - "Good Morning Good Morning" (Remix 1, from take 10)
- Personnel
  - Production Staff: George Martin (Producer), Geoff Emerick (Engineer), Richard Lush (2nd Engineer)

==== 21 February 1967 ====
Studio Two, EMI Studios, London (7.00pm–12.45am)

- Recording
  - "Fixing a Hole" (Take 1, Tape Reduction take 2 into take 3, SI onto take 3)
- Mono Mixing
  - "Fixing a Hole" (Remixes 2–6, from take 3)
- Editing
  - "Fixing a Hole" (of Mono Remixes 3 and 6) – released on Sgt. Pepper's Lonely Hearts Club Band (mono)
- Personnel
  - Production Staff: George Martin (Producer), Geoff Emerick (Engineer), Richard Lush (2nd Engineer)

==== 22 February 1967 ====
Studio Two, EMI Studios, London (7.00pm–3.45am)

- Recording
  - "A Day in the Life" (edit pieces 1 – 9)
    - The Last Chord – released with the Sgt. Pepper's Lonely Hearts Club Band 50th anniversary edition
- Mono Mixing
  - "A Day in the Life" (remixes 6 – 9, from takes 6 and 7)
- Editing
  - "A Day in the Life" (of mono remix 9 and edit piece 9) – released on Sgt. Pepper's Lonely Hearts Club Band (mono)
- Stereo Mixing
  - "A Day in the Life" (remixes 1–9, from takes 6 and 7)
- Recording
  - "Anything (AKA Drum Track(1)" (take 1)
- Personnel
  - Production Staff: George Martin (Producer), Geoff Emerick (Engineer), Richard Lush (2nd Engineer)

==== 23 February 1967 ====
Studio Two, EMI Studios, London (7.00pm–3.45am)

- Stereo Mixing
  - "A Day in the Life" (remixes 10–12, from takes 6 and 7)
- Editing
  - "A Day in the Life" (of stereo remix 12 and edit piece 9) – released on Sgt. Pepper's Lonely Hearts Club Band (stereo)
- Recording
  - "Lovely Rita" (takes 1–8, tape reduction take 8 into take 9)
- Personnel
  - Production Staff: George Martin (Producer), Geoff Emerick (Engineer), Richard Lush (2nd Engineer)

==== 24 February 1967 ====
Studio Two, EMI Studios, London (7.00pm–1.15am)

- Recording
  - "Lovely Rita" (SI onto take 9, tape reduction take 9 into take 10 and 11)
    - Speech and take 9 – released with the Sgt. Pepper's Lonely Hearts Club Band 50th anniversary edition
- Personnel
  - Production Staff: George Martin (Producer), Geoff Emerick (Engineer), Richard Lush (2nd Engineer)

==== 28 February 1967 ====
Studio Two, EMI Studios, London (7.00pm–3.00am)

- Recording
  - "Lucy in the Sky with Diamonds" (rehearsals)
- Personnel
  - Production Staff: George Martin (Producer), Geoff Emerick (Engineer), Richard Lush (2nd Engineer)

==== 1 March 1967 ====
Studio Two, EMI Studios, London (7.00pm–2.15am)

- Recording
  - "A Day in the Life" (SI onto take 6)
  - "Lucy in the Sky with Diamonds" (takes 1 – 7, tape reduction take 7 into take 8)
    - take 1 and Speech At the End – released with the Sgt. Pepper's Lonely Hearts Club Band 50th anniversary edition
    - Speech, False Start and take 5 – released with the Sgt. Pepper's Lonely Hearts Club Band 50th anniversary edition
    - Edit of takes 6, 7 & 8 – released on Anthology 2
- Personnel
  - Production Staff: George Martin (Producer), Geoff Emerick (Engineer), Richard Lush (2nd Engineer)

==== 2 March 1967 ====
Studio Two, EMI Studios, London (7.00pm–3.30am)

- Recording
  - "Lucy in the Sky with Diamonds" (SI onto take 8)
- Mono Mixing
  - "Lucy in the Sky with Diamonds" (remixes 1–11 from take 8)
    - RM 11 – released with the Sgt. Pepper's Lonely Hearts Club Band 50th anniversary edition
- Personnel
  - Production Staff: George Martin (Producer), Geoff Emerick (Engineer), Richard Lush (2nd Engineer)

==== 3 March 1967 ====
Studio Two, EMI Studios, London (7.00pm–2.15am)

- Recording
  - "Sgt. Pepper's Lonely Hearts Club Band" (SI onto take 10)
- Mono Mixing
  - "Lucy in the Sky with Diamonds" (remixes 1–4 from take 8) – remix 4 released on Sgt. Pepper's Lonely Hearts Club Band (mono)
- Personnel
  - Production Staff: George Martin (Producer), Geoff Emerick (Engineer), Richard Lush (2nd Engineer)

==== 6 March 1967 ====
Studio Two, EMI Studios, London (7.00pm–12.30am)

- Recording
  - "Sgt. Pepper's Lonely Hearts Club Band" (SI onto take 10)
- Mono Mixing
  - "Sgt. Pepper's Lonely Hearts Club Band" (remixes 2 and 3 from take 10) – remix 3 released on Sgt. Pepper's Lonely Hearts Club Band (mono)
- Stereo Mixing
  - "Sgt. Pepper's Lonely Hearts Club Band" (remixes 1 – 8 from take 10) – remix 8 released on Sgt. Pepper's Lonely Hearts Club Band (stereo)
- Personnel
  - Production Staff: George Martin (Producer), Geoff Emerick (Engineer), Richard Lush (2nd Engineer)

==== 7 March 1967 ====
Studio Two, EMI Studios, London (7.00pm–2.30am)

- Recording
  - "Lovely Rita" (SI onto take 11)
- Personnel
  - Production Staff: George Martin (Producer), Geoff Emerick (Engineer), Richard Lush (2nd Engineer)

==== 9 March 1967 ====
Studio Two, EMI Studios, London (7.00pm–3.30am)

- Recording
  - "Getting Better" (takes 1 – 7, tape reduction take 7 into takes 8 – 12)
    - take 1 / instrumental and speech at the end – released with the Sgt. Pepper's Lonely Hearts Club Band 50th anniversary edition
- Personnel
  - Production Staff: George Martin (Producer), Malcolm Addey/Ken Townsend (Engineer), Graham Kirkby (2nd Engineer)

==== 10 March 1967 ====
Studio Two, EMI Studios, London (7.00pm–4.00am)

- Recording
  - "Getting Better" (SI onto take 12)
    - take 12 – released with the Sgt. Pepper's Lonely Hearts Club Band 50th anniversary edition
- Personnel
  - Production Staff: George Martin (Producer), Geoff Emerick (Engineer), Richard Lush (2nd Engineer)

==== 13 March 1967 ====
Studio Two, EMI Studios, London (7.00pm–2.30am)

- Recording
  - "Good Morning Good Morning" (SI onto take 10)
- Personnel
  - Production Staff: George Martin (Producer), Geoff Emerick (Engineer), Richard Lush (2nd Engineer)

==== 15 March 1967 ====
Studio Two, EMI Studios, London (7.00pm–1.30am)

- Recording
  - George Coaching the Musicians – released with the Sgt. Pepper's Lonely Hearts Club Band 50th anniversary edition
  - "Within You Without You" (take 1)
    - take 1 / Indian instruments – released with the Sgt. Pepper's Lonely Hearts Club Band 50th anniversary edition
- Personnel
  - Production Staff: George Martin (Producer), Geoff Emerick (Engineer), Richard Lush (2nd Engineer)

==== 17 March 1967 ====
Studio Two, EMI Studios, London (7.00pm–12.45am)

- Recording
  - "She's Leaving Home" (takes 1 – 6)
    - take 1 / instrumental – released with the Sgt. Pepper's Lonely Hearts Club Band 50th anniversary edition
    - take 6 / instrumental – released with the Sgt. Pepper's Lonely Hearts Club Band 50th anniversary edition
- Personnel
  - Production Staff: George Martin (Producer), Geoff Emerick (Engineer), Richard Lush (2nd Engineer)

==== 20 March 1967 ====
Studio Two, EMI Studios, London (7.00pm–3.30am)

- Recording
  - "Beatle Talk" (take 1)
  - "She's Leaving Home" (tape reduction take 1 into takes 7 – 9, tape reduction take 6 into take 10, SI onto take 9)
- Mono Mixing
  - "She's Leaving Home" (remixes 1 – 6 from take 9)
    - RM 1 – released with the Sgt. Pepper's Lonely Hearts Club Band 50th anniversary edition
- Editing
  - "She's Leaving Home" (of mono remix 6) – released on Sgt. Pepper's Lonely Hearts Club Band (mono)
- Personnel
  - Production Staff: George Martin (Producer), Geoff Emerick (Engineer), Ken Scott (2nd Engineer)

==== 21 March 1967 ====
Studio Two, EMI Studios, London (7.00pm–2.45am)

- Recording
  - "Getting Better" (tape reduction take 12 into takes 13 and 14, SI onto take 14)
  - "Lovely Rita" (SI onto take 11)
- Mono Mixing
  - "Lovely Rita" (remixes 1 – 15 from take 11)
- Editing
  - "Lovely Rita" (of mono remixes 11 and 14) – released on Sgt. Pepper's Lonely Hearts Club Band (mono)
- Personnel
  - Production Staff: George Martin (Producer), Geoff Emerick (Engineer), Richard Lush (2nd Engineer)

==== 22 March 1967 ====
Studio Two, EMI Studios, London (7.00pm–2.15am)

- Recording
  - "Within You Without You" (SI onto take 1, tape reduction take 1 into take 2)
- Mono Mixing
  - "Within You Without You" (remix 1 from take 2)
- Personnel
  - Production Staff: George Martin (Producer), Geoff Emerick (Engineer), Richard Lush (2nd Engineer)

==== 23 March 1967 ====
Studio Two, EMI Studios, London (7.00pm–3.45am)

- Recording
  - "Getting Better" (SI onto take 14, tape reduction take 14 into take 15, SI onto take 15)
- Mono Mixing
  - "Getting Better" (remixes 1 – 3 from take 15) – remix 3 released on Sgt. Pepper's Lonely Hearts Club Band (mono)
- Personnel
  - Production Staff: Peter Vince (Producer and Engineer), Ken Scott (2nd Engineer)

==== 28 March 1967 ====
Studio Two, EMI Studios, London (7.00pm–4.45am)

- Recording
  - "Good Morning Good Morning" (SI onto take 10, tape reduction take 10 into take 11, SI onto take 11, unnumbered take)
  - "Being for the Benefit of Mr. Kite!" (SI onto take 9)
- Personnel
  - Production Staff: George Martin (Producer), Geoff Emerick (Engineer), Richard Lush (2nd Engineer)

==== 29 March 1967 ====
Studio Two, EMI Studios, London (7.00pm–5.45am)

- Recording
  - "Good Morning Good Morning" (unnumbered take, SI of unnumbered take onto take 11)
  - "Being for the Benefit of Mr. Kite!" (SI onto take 9)
  - "With a Little Help from My Friends" (takes 1 – 10, tape reduction take 10 into take 11, SI onto take 11)
    - take 1 / false start and take 2 / instrumental – released with the Sgt. Pepper's Lonely Hearts Club Band 50th anniversary edition
- Personnel
  - Production Staff: George Martin (Producer), Geoff Emerick (Engineer), Richard Lush (2nd Engineer)

==== 30 March 1967 ====
Studio Two, EMI Studios, London (11.00pm–7.30am)

- Recording
  - "With a Little Help from My Friends" (SI onto take 11)
- Personnel
  - Production Staff: George Martin (Producer), Geoff Emerick (Engineer), Richard Lush (2nd Engineer)

==== 31 March 1967 ====
Studio Two, EMI Studios, London (7.00pm–3.00am)

- Mono Mixing
  - "With a Little Help from My Friends" (remixes 1 – 15 from take 11) – remix 7 released on Sgt. Pepper's Lonely Hearts Club Band (mono)
- Recording
  - "Being for the Benefit of Mr. Kite!" (SI onto take 9)
- Mono Mixing
  - "Being for the Benefit of Mr. Kite!" (remixes 1 – 7 from take 9) – remix 4 released on Sgt. Pepper's Lonely Hearts Club Band (mono)
- Personnel
  - Production Staff: George Martin (Producer), Geoff Emerick (Engineer), Richard Lush (2nd Engineer)

==== 1 April 1967 ====
Studio One, EMI Studios, London (7.00pm–6.00am)

- Recording
  - "Sgt. Pepper's Lonely Hearts Club Band (Reprise)" (takes 1 – 9)
    - take 5 – released on Anthology 2
    - Speech and take 8 – released with the Sgt. Pepper's Lonely Hearts Club Band 50th anniversary edition
- Mono Mixing
  - "Sgt. Pepper's Lonely Hearts Club Band (Reprise)" (remixes 1 – 9 from take 9) – remix 9 released on Sgt. Pepper's Lonely Hearts Club Band (mono)
- Personnel
  - Production Staff: George Martin (Producer), Geoff Emerick (Engineer), Richard Lush (2nd Engineer)

==== 3 April 1967 ====
Studio One, EMI Studios, London (7.00pm–3.00am)

- Recording
  - "Within You Without You" (SI onto take 2)

Studio Two (control room only), EMI Studios, London (3.00am–6.30am)

- Mono Mixing
  - "Within You Without You" (remixes 1 – 3 from 'part 1' of take 2, remixes 4 and 5 from 'parts 2 and 3' of take 2)
- Personnel
  - Production Staff: George Martin (Producer), Geoff Emerick (Engineer), Richard Lush (2nd Engineer)

==== 4 April 1967 ====
Studio Two (control room only), EMI Studios, London (7.00pm–12.45am)

- Mono Mixing
  - "Within You Without You" (remixes 6 – 11 from 'part 1' of take 2, remix 12 from 'parts 2 and 3' of take 2)
- Editing
  - "Within You Without You" (of mono remixes 10 and 12, with SI) – released on Sgt. Pepper's Lonely Hearts Club Band (mono)
- Stereo Mixing
  - "Within You Without You" (remixes 1 – 3 from 'part 1' of take 2, remixes 4 and 5 from 'parts 2 and 3' of take 2)
- Editing
  - "Within You Without You" (of stereo remixes 3 and 5, with SI) – released on Sgt. Pepper's Lonely Hearts Club Band (stereo)
- Personnel
  - Production Staff: George Martin (Producer), Geoff Emerick (Engineer), Richard Lush (2nd Engineer)

==== 6 April 1967 ====
Studio Two (control room only), EMI Studios, London (7.00pm–1.00am)

- Mono Mixing
  - Crossfades for LP
  - "Good Morning Good Morning" (remixes 1 and 2 from take 11)
- Stereo Mixing
  - "Good Morning Good Morning" (remixes 1 – 5 from take 11) – remix 5 released on Sgt. Pepper's Lonely Hearts Club Band (stereo)
- Personnel
  - Production Staff: George Martin (Producer), Geoff Emerick (Engineer), Richard Lush (2nd Engineer)

==== 7 April 1967 ====
Studio Two (control room only), EMI Studios, London (7.00pm–1.00am)

- Stereo Mixing
  - Crossfades for LP
  - "With a Little Help from My Friends" (remixes 1 – 3 from take 11) – remix 3 released on Sgt. Pepper's Lonely Hearts Club Band (stereo)
  - "Being for the Benefit of Mr. Kite!" (remixes 1 – 8 from take 9) – remix 8 released on Sgt. Pepper's Lonely Hearts Club Band (stereo)
  - "Fixing a Hole" (remix 1 from take 3) – released on Sgt. Pepper's Lonely Hearts Club Band (stereo)
  - "Lucy in the Sky with Diamonds" (remixes 1–5 from take 8) – remix 5 released on Sgt. Pepper's Lonely Hearts Club Band (stereo)
- Personnel
  - Production Staff: George Martin (Producer), Geoff Emerick (Engineer), Richard Lush (2nd Engineer)

==== 17 April 1967 ====
Studio Two (control room only), EMI Studios, London (7.00pm–1.00am)

- Stereo Mixing
  - "Getting Better" (remix 1 from take 15) – released on Sgt. Pepper's Lonely Hearts Club Band (stereo)
  - "She's Leaving Home" (remixes 1 – 6 from take 9)
  - "When I'm Sixty-Four" (remix 1 from take 4) – released on Sgt. Pepper's Lonely Hearts Club Band (stereo)
  - "Lovely Rita" (remixes 1 and 2 from take 11) – remix 2 released on Sgt. Pepper's Lonely Hearts Club Band (stereo)
- Editing
  - "She's Leaving Home" (of stereo remix 6) – released on Sgt. Pepper's Lonely Hearts Club Band (stereo)
- Personnel
  - Production Staff: George Martin (Producer), Geoff Emerick (Engineer), Richard Lush (2nd Engineer)

==== 19 April 1967 ====
Studio Two (control room only), EMI Studios, London (7.00pm–12.30am)

- Mono Mixing
  - "Good Morning Good Morning" (remixes 10 – 23 from take 11) – remix 23 released on Sgt. Pepper's Lonely Hearts Club Band (mono)
  - "Only a Northern Song" (remix 4 from take 12)
- Personnel
  - Production Staff: George Martin (Producer), Geoff Emerick (Engineer), Richard Lush (2nd Engineer)

==== 20 April 1967 ====
Studio Two (control room only), EMI Studios, London (5.00pm–6.15pm)

- Stereo Mixing
  - "Sgt. Pepper's Lonely Hearts Club Band (Reprise)" (remixes 1 – 10 from take 9) – remix 10 released on Sgt. Pepper's Lonely Hearts Club Band (stereo)
- Personnel
  - Production Staff: N/A (Producer), Geoff Emerick (Engineer), Richard Lush (2nd Engineer)

Studio Two, EMI Studios, London (7.00pm–2.15am)

- Recording
  - "Only a Northern Song" (SI onto take 3, SI onto take 11)
- Personnel
  - Production Staff: George Martin (Producer), Geoff Emerick (Engineer), Richard Lush (2nd Engineer)

==== 21 April 1967 ====
Studio Two, EMI Studios, London (7.00pm–1.30am)

- Mono Mixing
  - "Only a Northern Song" (remixes 1 – 11 from takes 3 and 11) – remix 6 used in Yellow Submarine (film); included on Yellow Submarine (2009 remastered) and Mono Masters
- Recording
  - Edit for LP end (take 1)
- Personnel
  - Production Staff: George Martin (Producer), Geoff Emerick (Engineer), Richard Lush (2nd Engineer)

=== Magical Mystery Tour sessions ===
==== 25 April 1967 ====
Studio Three, EMI Studios, London (7.00pm-3.45am)

- Recording
  - "Magical Mystery Tour" (tape loop of coach noise, takes 1 – 3, tape reduction take 3 into takes 4 – 8)
- Personnel
  - Production Staff: George Martin (Producer), Geoff Emerick (Engineer), Richard Lush (2nd Engineer)

==== 26 April 1967 ====
Studio Three, EMI Studios, London (7.00pm-2.00am)

- Recording
  - "Magical Mystery Tour" (SI onto take 8, tape reduction take 8 into take 9)
- Personnel
  - Production Staff: George Martin (Producer), Geoff Emerick (Engineer), Richard Lush (2nd Engineer)

==== 27 April 1967 ====
Studio Three, EMI Studios, London (7.00pm-12.45am)

- Recording
  - "Magical Mystery Tour" (SI onto take 9)
- Mono Mixing
  - "Magical Mystery Tour" (remixes 1 – 4 from take 9)
- Personnel
  - Production Staff: George Martin (Producer), Geoff Emerick (Engineer), Richard Lush (2nd Engineer)

==== 3 May 1967 ====
Studio Three, EMI Studios, London (7.00pm-12.15am)

- Recording
  - "Magical Mystery Tour" (SI onto take 9)
  - Production Staff: George Martin (Producer), Malcolm Addey (Engineer), Richard Lush (2nd Engineer)

==== 4 May 1967 ====
Studio Three (control room only), EMI Studios, London (7.00pm-11.15pm)

- Mono Mixing
  - "Magical Mystery Tour" (remixes 1 – 7 from take 9) – remix 7 used in Magical Mystery Tour (film)
- Personnel
  - Production Staff: George Martin (Producer), Geoff Emerick (Engineer), Richard Lush (2nd Engineer)

==== 9 May 1967 ====
Studio Two, EMI Studios, London (11.00pm-6.15am)

- Recording
  - "Untitled" (take 1)
- Personnel
  - Production Staff: George Martin (Producer), Geoff Emerick (Engineer), Richard Lush (2nd Engineer)

==== 11 May 1967 ====
Studio One, Olympic Sound Studios, London (9.00pm-3.00am)

- Recording
  - "Baby, You're a Rich Man" (takes 1 – 12, tape reduction take 12 into takes 1 and 2)
    - takes 11 and 12 – released on Anthology 4
- Mono Mixing
  - "Baby, You're a Rich Man" (remix 1 from take 2) – released as the B-side to "All You Need Is Love"; included on Magical Mystery Tour (mono, U. S.)
- Personnel
  - Production Staff: George Martin (Producer), Keith Grant (Engineer), Eddie Kramer (2nd Engineer)

==== 12 May 1967 ====
Studio Two, EMI Studios, London (7.00pm-12.30am)

- Recording
  - "All Together Now" (takes 1 – 9)
- Mono Mixing
  - "All Together Now" (remixes 1 – 6 from take 9) – remix 6 used in Yellow Submarine (film); included on Mono Masters
- Personnel
  - Production Staff: N/A (Producer), Geoff Emerick (Engineer), Richard Lush (2nd Engineer)

==== 17 May 1967 ====
Studio Two, EMI Studios, London (7.00pm-2.30am)

- Recording
  - "You Know My Name (Look Up the Number)" (Part 1, takes 1 – 14)
- Personnel
  - Production Staff: Geoff Emerick (Producer and Engineer), Richard Lush (2nd Engineer)

==== 25 May 1967 ====
De Lane Lea Music Recording Studio, London (time unknown)

- Recording
  - "It's All Too Much" (takes 1 – 4)
- Personnel
  - Production Staff: N/A (Producer), Dave Siddle (Engineer), Mike Weighell (2nd Engineer)

==== 31 May 1967 ====
De Lane Lea Music Recording Studio, London (time unknown)

- Recording
  - "It's All Too Much" (tape reduction take 4 into takes 1 and 2, SI onto take 2)
- Personnel
  - Production Staff: N/A (Producer), Dave Siddle (Engineer), Mike Weighell (2nd Engineer)

==== 1 June 1967 ====
De Lane Lea Music Recording Studio, London (time unknown)

- Recording
  - "Untitled (no numbered takes)
- Personnel
  - Production Staff: George Martin (Producer), Dave Siddle (Engineer), Mike Weighell (2nd Engineer)

==== 2 June 1967 ====
De Lane Lea Music Recording Studio, London (8.30pm-2.00am)

- Recording
  - "It's All Too Much" (SI onto take 2)
  - "Untitled (no numbered takes)
- Personnel
  - Production Staff: George Martin (Producer), Dave Siddle (Engineer), Mike Weighell (2nd Engineer)

==== 7 June 1967 ====
Studio Two, EMI Studios, London (7.00pm-2.00am)

- Recording
  - "You Know My Name (Look Up the Number)" (SI onto take 9, takes 20 – 24)
- Personnel
  - Production Staff: George Martin (Producer), Geoff Emerick (Engineer), Richard Lush (2nd Engineer)

==== 8 June 1967 ====
Studio Two, EMI Studios, London (7.00pm-1.00am)

- Recording
  - "You Know My Name (Look Up the Number)" (part 2 takes 1 – 12, part 3 takes 1 – 4, part 4 takes 1–6, part 5 take 1)
- Personnel
  - Production Staff: George Martin (Producer), Geoff Emerick (Engineer), Richard Lush (2nd Engineer)

==== 9 June 1967 ====
Studio Two (control room only), EMI Studios, London (7.00pm-11.00pm)

- Editing
  - "You Know My Name (Look Up the Number)" (take 30 consisting of takes of part 1 – 5)
- Mono Mixing
  - "You Know My Name (Look Up the Number)" (remix 1 from take 30)
- Personnel
  - Production Staff: George Martin (Producer), Geoff Emerick (Engineer), Richard Lush (2nd Engineer)

==== 14 June 1967 ====
Studio One, Olympic Sound Studios, London (time unknown)

- Recording
  - "All You Need Is Love" (takes 1 – 33, tape reduction take 10)
- Personnel
  - Production Staff: George Martin (Producer), Eddie Kramer (Engineer), George Chkiantz (2nd Engineer)

==== 19 June 1967 ====
Studio Three, EMI Studios, London (7.00pm-1.45am)

- Tape copying
  - "All You Need Is Love" (of take 10)
- Recording
  - "All You Need Is Love" (SI onto take 10)
- Personnel
  - Production Staff: George Martin (Producer), Geoff Emerick (Engineer), Richard Lush (2nd Engineer)

==== 21 June 1967 ====
Room 53, EMI Studios, London (4.30pm-5.00pm)

- Mono Mixing
  - "All You Need Is Love" (remix 1 from take 10)
- Personnel
  - Production Staff: George Martin (Producer), Malcolm Addey (Engineer), Phil McDonald (2nd Engineer)

Studio Three, EMI Studios, London (7.00pm-11.30pm)

- Mono Mixing
  - "All You Need Is Love" (demo remix unnumbered)
- Personnel
  - Production Staff: George Martin (Producer), Geoff Emerick (Engineer), Richard Lush (2nd Engineer)

==== 23 June 1967 ====
Studio One, EMI Studios, London (4.30pm-11.00pm)

- Recording
  - "All You Need Is Love" (tape reduction of take 10, takes 34–43 as SI onto take 10)
- Personnel
  - Production Staff: George Martin (Producer), Geoff Emerick (Engineer), Richard Lush (2nd Engineer)

==== 24 June 1967 ====
Studio One, EMI Studios, London (5.00pm-8.00pm)

- Recording
  - "All You Need Is Love" (takes 44–47 as SI onto take 10)
- Personnel
  - Production Staff: George Martin (Producer), Geoff Emerick (Engineer), Richard Lush (2nd Engineer)

==== 25 June 1967 ====
Studio One, EMI Studios, London (2.00pm-1.00am)

- Recording
  - "All You Need Is Love" (takes 48–50, BBC rehearsal takes 1–3, takes 51–53, takes 54–58 [58 being live BBC broadcast], SI onto take 58)
    - rehearsal – released on Anthology 4
- Personnel
  - Production Staff: George Martin (Producer), Geoff Emerick (Engineer), Richard Lush/Martin Benge (2nd Engineer)

==== 26 June 1967 ====
Studio Two (control room only), EMI Studios, London (2.00pm-5.00pm)

- Mono mixing
  - "All You Need Is Love" (remixes 2 – 10 from take 58) – remix 4 released as a single; included on Magical Mystery Tour (mono, U. S.)
- Personnel
  - Production Staff: George Martin (Producer), Geoff Emerick (Engineer), Richard Lush (2nd Engineer)

==== 22 August 1967 ====
Chappell Recording Studios, London (time unknown)

- Recording
  - "Your Mother Should Know" (takes 1 – 8)
- Personnel
  - Production Staff: George Martin (Producer), John Timperley (Engineer), John Iles (2nd Engineer)

==== 23 August 1967 ====
Chappell Recording Studios, London (time unknown)

- Recording
  - "Your Mother Should Know" (tape reduction take 8 into take 9, SI onto take 9)
- Personnel
  - Production Staff: George Martin (Producer), John Timperley (Engineer), John Iles (2nd Engineer)

==== 5 September 1967 ====
Studio One, EMI Studios, London (7.00pm-1.00am)

- Recording
  - "I Am the Walrus" (takes 1 – 16)
    - Take 16 – released on Anthology 2
- Personnel
  - Production Staff: George Martin (Producer), Geoff Emerick (Engineer), Ken Scott/Richard Lush (2nd Engineer)

==== 6 September 1967 ====
Studio Two, EMI Studios, London (7.00pm-3.00am)

- Recording
  - "I Am the Walrus" (tape reduction take 16 into take 17, SI onto take 17)
- Mono mixing
  - "I Am the Walrus" (remixes 1 – 4 from take 17)
- Recording
  - "The Fool on the Hill" (take 1)
    - Demo released on Anthology 2
  - "Blue Jay Way" (take 1)
- Personnel
  - Production Staff: George Martin (Producer), Geoff Emerick (Engineer), Ken Scott (2nd Engineer)

==== 7 September 1967 ====
Studio Two, EMI Studios, London (7.00pm-3.15am)

- Recording
  - "Blue Jay Way" (tape reduction take 1 into take 2, SI onto take 2, tape reduction take 2 into take 3, SI onto take 3)
- Personnel
  - Production Staff: George Martin (Producer), Peter Vince (Engineer), Ken Scott (2nd Engineer)

==== 8 September 1967 ====
Studio Three, EMI Studios, London (7.00pm-2.45am)

- Recording
  - "Aerial Tour Instrumental" (working title of "Flying") (takes 1 – 6, tape reduction take 6 into take 7 and 8, SI onto take 8)
- Mono mixing
  - "Aerial Tour Instrumental" (remixes 1 – 4 from take 8)
- Personnel
  - Production Staff: George Martin (Producer), Geoff Emerick (Engineer), Richard Lush (2nd Engineer)

==== 16 September 1967 ====
Studio Three, EMI Studios, London (7.00pm-3.45am)

- Recording
  - "Your Mother Should Know" (Remake takes 20 – 30)
    - Take 27 – released on Anthology 2
- Mono mixing
  - "Blue Jay Way" (remix 1 from take 3)
- Tape copying
  - "I Am the Walrus" (of mono remix 4)
  - "Blue Jay Way" (of mono remix 1)
- Personnel
  - Production Staff: George Martin (Producer), Ken Scott (Engineer), Jeff Jarratt (2nd Engineer)

==== 25 September 1967 ====
Studio Two, EMI Studios, London (7.00pm-3.00am)

- Recording
  - "The Fool on the Hill" (takes 1 – 3, tape reduction take 3 into take 4, SI onto take 4)
    - Take 4 – released on Anthology 2
- Mono mixing
  - "The Fool on the Hill" (remix 1 from take 4)
- Personnel
  - Production Staff: George Martin (Producer), Ken Scott (Engineer), Richard Lush (2nd Engineer)

==== 26 September 1967 ====
Studio Two, EMI Studios, London (7.00pm-4.15am)

- Recording
  - "The Fool on the Hill" (tape reduction take 4 into take 5, SI onto take 5, tape reduction take 5 into take 6, SI onto take 6)
    - Take 5 - Instrumental – released on Anthology 4
- Personnel
  - Production Staff: N/A (Producer), Ken Scott (Engineer), Richard Lush (2nd Engineer)

==== 27 September 1967 ====
Studio One, EMI Studios, London (2.30pm-5.30pm)

- Recording
  - "I Am the Walrus" (tape reduction take 17 into takes 18–24 with SI onto takes 18–24)
    - Take 19 - Strings, brass, clarinet overdub – released on Anthology 4

Studio Two, EMI Studios, London (7.00pm-3.30am)

- Recording
  - "I Am the Walrus" (tape reduction take 20 into take 25, SI onto take 25)
  - "The Fool on the Hill" (SI onto take 6)
- Mono mixing
  - "The Fool on the Hill" (remix 2 from take 6)
- Personnel
  - Production Staff: George Martin (Producer), Ken Scott (Engineer), Richard Lush (2nd Engineer)

==== 28 September 1967 ====
Studio Two, EMI Studios, London (4.00pm-3.00am)

- Tape copying
  - "Magical Mystery Tour" (of mono remix 7)
  - "Flying" (of mono remix 4)
- Recording
  - "I Am the Walrus" (tape reduction of take 25 as SI onto take 17)
- Mono mixing
  - "I Am the Walrus" (remixes 2 – 5 from take 17)
- Editing
  - "I Am the Walrus" (of mono remix 2)
- Recording
  - "Flying" (SI onto take 8, takes 1-5 of SI onto take 8)
- Mono mixing
  - "Flying" (remixes 5 and 6 from take 8)
- Editing
  - "Flying" (of mono remix 6) – released on Magical Mystery Tour (mono)
- Personnel
  - Production Staff: George Martin (Producer), Ken Scott (Engineer), Richard Lush (2nd Engineer)

==== 29 September 1967 ====
Studio Two, EMI Studios, London (7.00pm-5.00am)

- Mono mixing
  - "I Am the Walrus" (remixes 6 – 22 from take 17)
- Editing
  - "I Am the Walrus" (of mono remixes 10 and 22 called mono remix 23) – released as the B-side to "Hello, Goodbye"; included on Magical Mystery Tour (mono)
- Recording
  - "Your Mother Should Know" (tape reduction take 9 into takes 50 – 52, SI onto take 52)
- Mono mixing
  - "Your Mother Should Know" (remix 20 from take 52)
- Personnel
  - Production Staff: George Martin (Producer), Ken Scott (Engineer), Graham Kirkby (2nd Engineer)

==== 2 October 1967 ====
Studio Two, EMI Studios, London (10.00pm-2.30am)

- Mono mixing
  - "Your Mother Should Know" (remixes 21 – 25 from take 52) – remix 25 released on Magical Mystery Tour (mono)
- Recording
  - "Hello, Goodbye" (takes 1 – 14, tape reduction take 14 into takes 15 and 16)
    - Take 16 – released on Anthology 2
- Personnel
  - Production Staff: George Martin (Producer), Ken Scott (Engineer), Graham Kirkby (2nd Engineer)

==== 6 October 1967 ====
Studio Two, EMI Studios, London (7.00pm-12.00am)

- Recording
  - "Blue Jay Way" (SI onto take 3)
- Personnel
  - Production Staff: George Martin (Producer), Geoff Emerick (Engineer), Richard Lush (2nd Engineer)

==== 12 October 1967 ====
De Lane Lea Music Recording Studio, London (2.30pm-8.00pm)

- Mono mixing
  - "It's All Too Much" (remixes 1 and 2 from take 2)
- Personnel
  - Production Staff: George Martin (Producer), Dave Siddle (Engineer), Mike Weighell (2nd Engineer)

Studio Three, EMI Studios, London (6.30pm-2.00am)

- Mono mixing
  - "Blue Jay Way" (remixes 2 – 9 from take 3)
- Editing
  - "Blue Jay Way" (of mono remixes 6 and 9)
- Recording
  - "Shirley's Wild Accordion" (takes 1 – 8, tape reduction take 8 into takes 9 and 10, SI onto take 10, takes 11 – 15)
- Mono mixing
  - "Shirley's Wild Accordion" (remixes 1, 2 and 3 from takes 10, 7 and 14 respectively)
- Personnel
  - Production Staff: John Lennon (Producer), Ken Scott (Engineer), Richard Lush (2nd Engineer)

==== 19 October 1967 ====
Studio One, EMI Studios, London (7.00pm-3.30am)

- Recording
  - "Hello, Goodbye" (SI onto take 16, tape reduction take 16 into take 17)
- Personnel
  - Production Staff: George Martin (Producer), Ken Scott (Engineer), Richard Lush (2nd Engineer)

==== 20 October 1967 ====
Studio Three, EMI Studios, London (7.00pm-3.45am)

- Recording
  - "The Fool on the Hill" (SI onto take 6)
  - "Hello, Goodbye" (SI onto take 17)
- Personnel
  - Production Staff: George Martin (Producer), Ken Scott (Engineer), Phil McDonald (2nd Engineer)

==== 25 October 1967 ====
Studio Two, EMI Studios, London (7.00pm-3.00am)

- Mono mixing
  - "The Fool on the Hill" (remixes 10 – 12 from take 6)
- Editing
  - "The Fool on the Hill" (of mono remix 12) – released on Magical Mystery Tour (mono)
- Recording
  - "Hello, Goodbye" (tape reduction take 17 into takes 18 – 21, SI onto take 21)
- Personnel
  - Production Staff: George Martin (Producer), Ken Scott (Engineer), Graham Kirkby (2nd Engineer)

==== 1 November 1967 ====
Room 53, EMI Studios, London (10.00am-1.00pm)

- Mono mixing
  - "All You Need Is Love" (remix 11 from take 58) – used in Yellow Submarine (film)
  - "Lucy in the Sky with Diamonds" (remix 20 from take 8) – planned to use in Yellow Submarine (film); not included.
- Personnel
  - Production Staff: George Martin (Producer), Ken Scott (Engineer), Richard Lush (2nd Engineer)

Studio Three (control room only, EMI Studios, London (2.30pm-6.00pm)

- Recording
  - Untitled sound effects (take 20)
  - "Hello, Goodbye" (tape reduction take 21 into takes 22 – 25)
- Stereo mixing
  - "The Fool on the Hill" (remixes 1 – 5 from take 6)
- Editing
  - "The Fool on the Hill" (of stereo remix 5) – released on Magical Mystery Tour (stereo)
- Personnel
  - Production Staff: George Martin (Producer), Geoff Emerick (Engineer), Graham Kirkby (2nd Engineer)

==== 2 November 1967 ====
Studio Three (Control room only, EMI Studios, London (2.30pm-6.00pm)

- Recording
  - "Hello, Goodbye" (SI onto take 22)
- Mono mixing
  - "Hello, Goodbye" (remixes 1-6 from take 22) – remix 6 released as a single; included on Magical Mystery Tour (mono, U. S.)
- Personnel
  - Production Staff: George Martin (Producer), Geoff Emerick (Engineer), Jeff Jarratt (2nd Engineer)

==== 6 November 1967 ====
Studio Three (Control room only, EMI Studios, London (2.30pm-6.00pm)

- Stereo mixing
  - "Hello, Goodbye" (remixes 1 and 2 from take 22) – remix 2 released on Magical Mystery Tour (stereo, U. S.)
  - "I Am the Walrus" (remixes 1 – 7 from take 17 and from mono remix 22)
  - "Your Mother Should Know" (remixes 1 and 2 from take 52) – remix 2 released on Magical Mystery Tour (stereo)
  - "Magical Mystery Tour" (remixes 1 – 4 from take 9)
- Editing
  - "I Am the Walrus" (of stereo remixes 6 and 7)
- Personnel
  - Production Staff: George Martin (Producer), Geoff Emerick (Engineer), Ken Scott (2nd Engineer)

==== 7 November 1967 ====
Studio Two (control room only), EMI Studios, London (2.30pm-5.45pm)

- Stereo mixing
  - "Blue Jay Way" (remixes 1 and 2 from take 3)
  - "Flying" (remix 1 from take 8)
- Editing
  - "Blue Jay Way" (of stereo remix 2)
  - "Flying" (of stereo remix 1) – released on Magical Mystery Tour (stereo)
- Personnel
  - Production Staff: George Martin (Producer), Ken Scott (Engineer), Peter Mew (2nd Engineer)

Studio One, EMI Studios, London (9.00pm-4.30pm)

- Mono mixing
  - "Blue Jay Way" (remixes 20 – 28 from take 3)
- Stereo mixing
  - "Blue Jay Way" (remixes 10 – 12 from take 3)
- Editing
  - "Blue Jay Way" (of mono remix 27, of stereo remix 12) – mono remix 27 released on Magical Mystery Tour (mono); stereo remix 12 released on Magical Mystery Tour (stereo)
- Stereo mixing/recording
  - "Magical Mystery Tour" (remixes 5 and 6 from stereo remix 4 with new SI) – remix 6 released on Magical Mystery Tour (stereo)
- Mono mixing/recording
  - "Magical Mystery Tour" (remixes 8 -10 from mono remix 7 with new SI) – remix 10 released on Magical Mystery Tour (mono)
- Tape copying
  - "I Am the Walrus" (of mono remix 23)
  - "Your Mother Should Know" (of mono remix 25)
  - "Flying" (of edit of mono remix 6 and of edit of stereo remix 1)
  - "Magical Mystery Tour" (of mono remix 10 and of stereo remix 6)
  - "Blue Jay Way" (of edit of mono remix 27 and of edit of stereo remix 12)
  - "The Fool on the Hill" (of edit of mono remix 12)
  - "Strawberry Fields Forever" (of stereo remix 3)
- Personnel
  - Production Staff: George Martin (Producer), Geoff Emerick (Engineer), Graham Kirkby (2nd Engineer)

==== 15 November 1967 ====
Studio Two (control room only), EMI Studios, London (10.30am-11.00am)

- Mono mixing
  - "Hello, Goodbye" (remix 10 take 22)
- Tape copying
  - "It's All Too Much" (of mono remix 1)
  - "All Together Now" (of mono remix 6)
  - "Only a Northern Song" (of mono remix 6)
- Personnel
  - Production Staff: N/A (Producer), Geoff Emerick (Engineer), Richard Lush (2nd Engineer)

==== 17 November 1967 ====
Room 53, EMI Studios, London (10.00am-1.15pm)

- Stereo mixing
  - "I Am the Walrus" (remix 25 from take 17)
- Editing
  - "I Am the Walrus" (of stereo remixes 25 and 7) – released on Magical Mystery Tour (stereo)
- Personnel
  - Production Staff: George Martin (Producer), Geoff Emerick (Engineer), Ken Scott (2nd Engineer)

==== 28 November 1967 ====
Studio Three, EMI Studios, London (6.00pm-2.45am)

- Recording
  - "Christmas Time (Is Here Again)" (take 1 [music], takes 1 – 10 [speech], SI of sound effects onto edit/remix)
- Mono mixing
  - "Christmas Time (Is Here Again)" (of takes 1 [music], takes 2, 6 and 10 [speech])
- Personnel
  - Production Staff: George Martin (Producer), Geoff Emerick (Engineer), Richard Lush (2nd Engineer)

==== 29 November 1967 ====
Studio One (control room only), EMI Studios, London (2.30pm-5.30pm)

- Editing
  - "Christmas Time (Is Here Again)" of unnumbered mono remixes)
- Tape copying
  - "Christmas Time (Is Here Again)" (of master version)
- Personnel
  - Production Staff: George Martin (Producer), Geoff Emerick (Engineer), Richard Lush (2nd Engineer)

== 1968 ==
=== "Lady Madonna" sessions ===
==== 12 January 1968 ====
EMI Recording Studios, Bombay, India (time unknown)

- Recording
  - "Untitled" (working title of "The Inner Light") (Harrison) (takes 1–5)
    - take 6 (Tape Copy of take 5) – released with The Beatles ("White Album") 50th anniversary edition
- Personnel
  - Musicians: Ashish Khan (sarod), Mahapurush Misra (tabla, pakavaj), Sharad Jadev and Hanuman Jadev (shanhais), Shambu-Das, Indril Bhattacharya and Shankar Ghosh (sitar), Chandra Shakher (sur-bahar), Shiv Kumar Sharmar (santorr), S.R. Kenkare and Hari Prasad Chaurasia (flute), Vinayak Vohra (taar shehnai), Rijram Desad (dholak, harmonium; tala-tarang)
  - Production staff: George Harrison (producer), J.P. Sen and S.N. Gupta (engineer), unknown (2nd engineer)

==== 3 February 1968 ====
Studio Three, EMI Studios, London (2.30pm-1.30am)

- Recording
  - "Lady Madonna" (takes 1–3, SI on take 3)
    - take 2 – released with The Beatles ("White Album") 50th anniversary edition
- Personnel
  - Musicians: John Lennon (fuzzed electric guitar, vocals), Paul McCartney (bass guitar, piano), George Harrison (fuzzed electric guitar), Ringo Starr (drums)
  - Production staff: George Martin (producer), Ken Scott (engineer), Richard Lush (2nd engineer)

==== 4 February 1968 ====
Studio Three, EMI Studios, London (2.30pm-5.30pm)

- Recording
  - "Across the Universe" (takes 1–7)
    - take 2 – released on Anthology 2
    - take 6 – released with The Beatles ("White Album") 50th anniversary edition
  - "Across the Universe" (overdub onto take 7, tape reduction take 7 into take 8, overdub onto take 8, sound effects takes 1–3)
- Personnel
  - Musicians: John Lennon (acoustic guitar, vocals), George Harrison (tamboura, sitar), Ringo Starr (tomtoms), Lizzie Bravo and Gayleen Pease (backing vocal)
  - Production staff: George Martin (producer), Ken Scott and Martin Benge (engineer), Richard Lush and Phil McDonald (2nd engineer)

==== 6 February 1968 ====
Studio One, EMI Studios, London (2.30pm-8.00pm)

- Tape copying
  - "The Inner Light" (of take 5, numbered take 6)
- Recording
  - "The Inner Light" (overdub onto take 6)
- Mono mixing
  - "The Inner Light" (remix 1, from take 6)

Studio One, EMI Studios, London (9.00pm-2.00am)

- Recording
  - "Lady Madonna" (tape reduction take 3 into take 4, overdub onto take 4, tape reduction take 4 into take 5)
    - Backing Vocals from take 3 – released with The Beatles ("White Album") 50th anniversary edition
    - Edit of takes 3 and 4 – released on Anthology 2
- Mono mixing
  - "Lady Madonna" (remixes 1 and 2, from take 5)
- Personnel
  - Musicians: John Lennon (vocals), Paul McCartney (piano, vocal), George Harrison (vocal), Harry Klein and Bill Jackson (baritone saxophone), Ronnie Scott and Bill Povey (tenor saxophone)
  - Production staff: George Martin (producer), Geoff Emerick (engineer), Jerry Boys (2nd engineer)

==== 8 February 1968 ====
Studio Two, EMI Studios, London (2.30pm-9.00pm)

- Recording
  - "The Inner Light" (overdub onto take 6)
- Mono mixing
  - "The Inner Light (remixes 2–4, from take 6) – released as the B-side to "Lady Madonna"; included on Mono Masters
- Recording
  - "Across the Universe" (overdub onto take 8)

Studio Two (control room only), EMI Studios, London (10.00pm-12.15am)

- Mono mixing
  - "Across the Universe" (remixes 1 and 2, from take 8)
- Personnel
  - Musicians: John Lennon (mellotron, tone pedal guitar, vocals), Paul McCartney (piano, vocals), George Harrison (maracas, vocals), George Martin (organ)
  - Production staff: George Martin (producer), Geoff Emerick and Ken Scott (engineer), Richard Lush (2nd engineer)

==== 11 February 1968 ====
Studio Three, EMI Studios, London (4.00pm-2.00am)

- Recording
  - "Hey Bulldog" (takes 1–10)
    - take 4 – released on Anthology 4
- Mono mixing
  - "Hey Bulldog" (remixes 1 and 2, from take 10) – remix 2 used in Yellow Submarine (film); included on Mono Masters
- Personnel
  - Musicians: John Lennon (piano, vocals), Paul McCartney (bass guitar, vocals), George Harrison (lead guitar), Ringo Starr (drums)
  - Production staff: George Martin (producer), Geoff Emerick (engineer), Phil McDonald (2nd engineer)

==== 15 February 1968 ====
Studio Three (control room only), EMI Studios, London (4.30pm-6.00pm)

- Mono mixing
  - "Lady Madonna" (remixes 3–10, from take 5) – released as a single; included on Mono Masters
- Personnel
  - Production staff: George Martin (producer), Geoff Emerick (engineer), Martin Benge (2nd engineer)

=== The Beatles ("White Album") and "Hey Jude" single sessions ===
==== 30 May 1968 ====
Studio Two, EMI Studios, London (2.30pm-2.40am)

- Recording
  - "Revolution 1" (takes 1–18)
    - take 18 – released with The Beatles ("White Album") 50th anniversary edition

==== 31 May 1968 ====
Studio Three, EMI Studios, London (2.30pm-12.00pm)

- Recording
  - "Revolution 1" (SI onto take 18, tape reduction take 18 into take 19, SI onto take 19)

==== 4 June 1968 ====
Studio Three, EMI Studios, London (2.30pm-1.00am)

- Recording
  - "Revolution 1" (SI onto take 19, creating tape loops takes 1 and 2, tape reduction take 19 into take 20, SI onto take 20)
- Mono mixing
  - "Revolution 1" (unnumbered rough remix from take 20)

==== 5 June 1968 ====
Studio Three, EMI Studios, London (2.30pm-1.30am)

- Recording
  - "Don't Pass Me By" (takes 1–3, tape reduction take 3 into takes 4 and 5, SI onto take 5, tape reduction take 5 into take 6)
    - Takes 3 & 5 – released on Anthology 3

==== 6 June 1968 ====
Studio Two, EMI Studios, London (2.30pm-2.45am)

- Recording
  - "Don't Pass Me By" (SI onto take 5, tape reduction take 5 into take 7, SI onto take 7)
- Mono mixing
  - "Don't Pass Me By" (unnumbered rough remix from take 7)
- Recording
  - "Revolution 9" (Sound effects takes 1 -12)

==== 10 June 1968 ====
Studio Three, EMI Studios, London (2.30pm-5.45pm)

- Recording
  - "Revolution 9" (Sound effects takes 1 -3)

==== 11 June 1968 ====
Studio Two, EMI Studios, London (6.30pm-12.15am)

- Recording
  - "Blackbird" (takes 1 -32)
    - take 4 – released on Anthology 3
    - take 28 – released as part of The Beatles ("White Album") 50th anniversary edition
- Mono mixing
  - "Blackbird" (remixes 1–6 from take 32)

Studio Three, EMI Studios, London (7.00pm-10.15pm)

- Recording
  - "Revolution 9" (Sound effects)

==== 20 June 1968 ====
Studios One, Two and Three, EMI Studios, London (7.00pm-3.30am)

- Recording
  - "Revolution 9" (Sound effects takes 1 and 2, compilation of master version with SI)

==== 21 June 1968 ====
Studio Two, EMI Studios, London (2.30pm-3.30am)

- Recording
  - "Revolution 1" (SI onto take 20, tape reduction take 20 into take 21 and 22, SI onto take 22)
  - "Revolution 9" (SI onto master version)
- Stereo Mixing
  - "Revolution 1" (Remixes 1–7, from take 22)
  - "Revolution 9" (Remixes 1 and 2, from master version)

==== 25 June 1968 ====
Studio Two (control room only), EMI Studios, London, (2.00pm-8.00pm)

- Stereo Mixing
  - "Revolution 1" (Remixes 8–12 from take 22) – remix 12 released on The Beatles (stereo)
- Editing
  - "Revolution 9" (of remix stereo 2) – released on The Beatles (stereo)
- Tape copying
  - "Revolution 1" (of remix stereo 12)
  - "Revolution 9" (of edit of remix stereo 2)

==== 26 June 1968 ====
Studio Two, EMI Studios, London (7.00pm-3.30am)

- Recording
  - "Everybody's Got Something to Hide Except Me and My Monkey" (rehearsal)
    - Unnumbered Rehearsal – released as part of The Beatles ("White Album") 50th anniversary edition

==== 27 June 1968 ====
Studio Two, EMI Studios, London (5.00pm-3.45am)

- Recording
  - "Everybody's Got Something to Hide Except for Me And My Monkey" (takes 1 – 6, tape reduction take 6 into takes 7 and 8, SI onto take 8)

==== 28 June 1968 ====
Studio Two, EMI Studios, London (7.00pm-4.30am)

- Recording
  - "Good Night" (takes 1 – 5)

==== 1 July 1968 ====
Studio Two, EMI Studios, London (5.00pm-3.00am)

- Recording
  - "Everybody's Got Something to Hide Except for Me And My Monkey" (SI onto take 8, tape reduction take 8 into takes 9 and 10, SI onto take 10)

==== 2 July 1968 ====
Studio Two, EMI Studios, London (6.00pm-12.15am)

- Recording
  - "Good Night" (SI onto take 5, takes 6 – 15)

==== 3 July 1968 ====
Studio Two, EMI Studios, London (8.00pm-3.15am)

- Recording
  - "Ob-La-Di, Ob-La-Da" (takes 1–7, SI onto take 3, SI onto take7)
    - take 3 – released as part of The Beatles ("White Album") 50th anniversary edition
    - take 5 – released on Anthology 3

==== 4 July 1968 ====
Studio Two, EMI Studios, London (7.00pm-2.15am)

- Recording
  - "Ob-La-Di, Ob-La-Da" (SI onto take 4, tape reduction take 4 into take 5, SI onto take 5)

==== 5 July 1968 ====
Studio Two, EMI Studios, London (5.00pm-1.30am)

- Recording
  - "Ob-La-Di, Ob-La-Da" (SI onto take 5)

==== 8 July 1968 ====
Studio Two, EMI Studios, London (5.00pm-3.00am)

- Recording
  - "Ob-La-Di, Ob-La-Da" (Remake, takes 1 – 12, tape reduction take 12 into take 13, SI onto take 13)
- Mono mixing
  - "Ob-La-Di, Ob-La-Da" (unnumbered rough remix from take 13)

==== 9 July 1968 ====
Studio Three, EMI Studios, London (4.00pm-9.00pm)

- Recording
  - "Ob-La-Di, Ob-La-Da" (Re-re-make, takes 20 and 21)
  - "Ob-La-Di, Ob-La-Da" (Remake, SI onto take 13, tape reduction take 13 into take 22, SI onto take 22)
  - "Revolution" (Rehearsals)
    - Unnumbered Rehearsal – released as part of The Beatles ("White Album") 50th anniversary edition

==== 10 July 1968 ====
Studio Three, EMI Studios, London (7.00pm-1.30am)

- Recording
  - "Revolution" (Takes 1 – 10, tape reduction take 10 into takes 11–13, SI onto take 13, tape reduction take 13 into takes 14 and 15)
    - take 14 / Instrumental Backing Track – released as part of The Beatles ("White Album") 50th anniversary edition

==== 11 July 1968 ====
Studio Three, EMI Studios, London (4.00pm-3.45am)

- Recording
  - "Revolution" (SI onto take 15)
  - "Ob-La-Di, Ob-La-Da" (SI onto take 22)
  - "Revolution" (tape reduction take 15 into take 16, SI onto take 16)
  - "Ob-La-Di, Ob-La-Da" (tape reduction take 22 into takes 23 and 24, SI onto take 23)
- Mono mixing
  - "Ob-La-Di, Ob-La-Da" (remixes 1 and 2 from take 23)

==== 12 July 1968 ====
Studio Two, EMI Studios, London (3.00pm-4.00am)

- Recording
  - "Don't Pass Me By" (SI onto take 7)
- Mono mixing
  - "Don't Pass Me By" (remixes 1 – 4 from take 7)
  - "Ob-La-Di, Ob-La-Da" (remixes 10 and 11 from take 23)
- Recording
  - "Revolution" (SI onto take 16)
- Mono mixing
  - "Revolution" (remixes 10 – 13 from take 16)

==== 15 July 1968 ====
Studio Two, EMI Studios, London (3.30pm-3.00am)

- Mono mixing
  - "Revolution" (remixes 20 and 21 from take 16) – remix 21 (numbered 5) released as the B-side to "Hey Jude"; included on Mono Masters
- Recording
  - "Ob-La-Di, Ob-La-Da" (SI onto take 23)
- Mono mixing
  - "Ob-La-Di, Ob-La-Da" (remixes 12 – 21 from take 23)
- Recording
  - "Cry Baby Cry" (unnumbered takes)
    - Unnumbered Rehearsal – released as part of The Beatles ("White Album") 50th anniversary edition

==== 16 July 1968 ====
Studio Two, EMI Studios, London (4.00pm-2.00am)

- Recording
  - "Cry Baby Cry" (takes 1 -10, tape reduction take 10 into takes 11 and 12, SI onto take 12)
    - take 1 – released on Anthology 3

==== 18 July 1968 ====
Studio Two, EMI Studios, London (2.30pm-3.30am)

- Recording
  - "Cry Baby Cry" (SI onto take 12)
  - "Helter Skelter" (takes 1 – 3)
    - take 2 – released as part of The Beatles ("White Album") 50th anniversary edition

==== 19 July 1968 ====
Studio Two, EMI Studios, London (7.30pm-4.00am)

- Recording
  - "Sexy Sadie" (takes 1 – 21)
    - take 3 – released as part of The Beatles ("White Album") 50th anniversary edition
    - take 6 – released on Anthology 3

==== 22 July 1968 ====
Studio One, EMI Studios, London (7.00pm-1.40am)

- Recording
  - "Don't Pass Me By" (edit pieces 1 – 4)
    - A Beginning (take 4) – released on Anthology 3 and as part of The Beatles ("White Album") 50th anniversary edition
  - "Good Night" (takes 23 – 34, SI onto take 34)

==== 23 July 1968 ====
Studio Two, EMI Studios, London (7.00pm-2.30am)

- Recording
  - "Everybody's Got Something to Hide Except for Me And My Monkey" (SI onto take 10, tape reduction take 10 into takes 11 and 12, SI onto take 12)
- Mono mixing
  - "Everybody's Got Something to Hide Except for Me And My Monkey" (remixes 1 – 5 from take 12)
  - "Good Night" (remixes 1 – 6 from take 34)

==== 24 July 1968 ====
Studio Two, EMI Studios, London (7.00pm-2.30am)

- Recording
  - "Sexy Sadie" (Remake, takes 25 – 47)
  - "Sound Effects"

==== 25 July 1968 ====
Studio Two, EMI Studios, London (7.00pm-3.15am)

- Recording
  - "While My Guitar Gently Weeps" (Acoustic Version)
    - take 1 – released on Anthology 3
    - take 2 – released as part of The Beatles ("White Album") 50th anniversary edition

==== 29 July 1968 ====
Studio Two, EMI Studios, London (8.30pm-4.00am)

- Recording
  - "Hey Jude" (takes 1 – 6)
    - take 1 – released as part of The Beatles ("White Album") 50th anniversary edition
    - take 2 – released on Anthology 3

==== 30 July 1968 ====
Studio Two, EMI Studios, London (7.30pm-3.30am)

- Recording
  - "Hey Jude" (takes 7 – 23, tape reduction take 23 into takes 24 and 25)
    - St Louis Blues (Studio Jam) – released as part of The Beatles ("White Album") 50th anniversary edition
- Stereo mixing
  - "Hey Jude" (remix 1 from take 25)

==== 31 July 1968 ====
Trident Studios, Trident House, London (2.00pm-4.00am)

- Recording
  - "Hey Jude" (Remake takes 1 – 4, SI onto take 1)

==== 1 August 1968 ====
Trident Studios, Trident House, London (5.00pm-3.00am)

- Recording
  - "Hey Jude" (SI onto take 1)

==== 2 August 1968 ====
Trident Studios, Trident House, London (2.00pm-1.30am)

- Stereo mixing
  - "Hey Jude" (remixes 1 – 3 from take 1)

==== 6 August 1968 ====
Trident Studios, Trident House, London (5.30pm-7.30pm)

- Mono mixing
  - "Hey Jude" (remix 1 from remix stereo 3)

==== 7 August 1968 ====
Studio Two, EMI Studios, London, (3.00pm-5.30am)

- Tape copying
  - "Hey Jude" (of remix mono 1)
- Recording
  - "Not Guilty" (takes 1 – 46)

==== 8 August 1968 ====
Studio Two, EMI Studios, London, (6.40pm-6.30am)

- Mono mixing
  - "Hey Jude" (remixes 2 – 4 from take 1) – remix 4 (numbered 5) released as a single; included on Mono Masters
- Recording
  - "Not Guilty" (takes 47 – 101)
- Tape copying
  - "Hey Jude" (of remix mono 4, numbered 5)
  - "Revolution" (of remix mono 21, numbered 5)

==== 9 August 1968 ====
Studio Two, EMI Studios, London, (7.30pm-2.00am)

- Recording
  - "Not Guilty" (tape reduction take 99 into take 102, SI onto take 102)
    - take 102 – released as part of The Beatles ("White Album") 50th Anniversary Box Set
  - "Mother Nature's Son" (takes 1 – 25)
    - take 2 – released on Anthology 3
    - take 15 – released as part of The Beatles ("White Album") 50th anniversary edition

==== 12 August 1968 ====
Studio Two, EMI Studios, London, (7.00pm-4.15am)

- Recording
  - "Not Guilty" (SI onto take 102)
- Mono mixing
  - "Not Guilty" (remix 1 from take 102)

==== 13 August 1968 ====
Studio Two, EMI Studios, London, (7.00pm-5.30am)

- Recording
  - "Sexy Sadie" (Re-remake takes 100 – 107, tape reduction take 107 into takes 108 – 111)
  - "Yer Blues" (takes 1 – 14, tape reduction take 6 into takes 15 and 16, tape reduction extract of take 14 into take 17)
    - take 5 with Guide Vocal – released as part of The Beatles ("White Album") 50th anniversary edition
- Editing
  - "Yer Blues" (of takes 16 and 17)

==== 14 August 1968 ====
Studio Two, EMI Studios, London, (7.00pm-4.30am)

- Recording
  - "Yer Blues" (SI onto edit of takes 16 and 17)
- Mono mixing
  - "Yer Blues" (remix 1 – 4 from edit of takes 16 and 17)
- Recording
  - "What's the New Mary Jane" (takes 1 – 4)
    - take 1 – released as part of The Beatles ("White Album") 50th anniversary edition
- Mono mixing
  - "What's the New Mary Jane" (remix 1 from take 4)
- Tape copying
  - "Yer Blues" (of remix mono 3)
  - "What's the New Mary Jane" (of remix mono 1)

==== 15 August 1968 ====
Studio Two, EMI Studios, London, (7.00pm-3.00am)

- Recording
  - "Rocky Raccoon" (takes 1 – 9, tape reduction take 9 into take 10, SI onto take 10)
    - take 8 – released on Anthology 3 and as part of The Beatles ("White Album") 50th anniversary edition
- Mono mixing
  - "Rocky Raccoon" (remix 1 from take 10) – released on The Beatles (mono)
- Tape copying
  - "Yer Blues" (of remix mono 3)
  - "Rocky Raccoon" (of remix mono 1)

==== 16 August 1968 ====
Studio Two, EMI Studios, London, (7.00pm-5.00am)

- Recording
  - "While My Guitar Gently Weeps" (Remake, takes 1 – 14, tape reduction take 14 into take 15)

==== 20 August 1968 ====
Studio Three, EMI Studios, London, (5.00pm-5.30pm)

- Recording
  - "Yer Blues" (edit piece take 1)
- Editing
  - "Yer Blues" (of remix mono 3 and edit piece take 1) – released on The Beatles (mono)
- Mono tape copying
  - "Revolution 9" (mono copy 1, from edit of remix stereo 2)

Studio Two, EMI Studios, London, (8.00pm-4.00am)

- Recording
  - "Mother Nature's Son" (SI onto take 24, tape reduction take 24 into take 26, SI onto take 26)
  - "Etcetera" (take 1)
  - "Wild Honey Pie" (take 1)
- Mono mixing
  - "Mother Nature's Son" (remixes 1 – 8 from take 26)
  - "Wild Honey Pie" (remixes 1 – 6 from take 1) – remix 6 released on The Beatles (mono)

==== 21 August 1968 ====
Studio Two, EMI Studios, London, (7.30pm-7.15am)

- Recording
  - "Sexy Sadie" (tape reduction take 107 into take 112, SI onto take 112, tape reduction take 112 into takes 113–115, SI onto take 115, tape reduction take 115 into take 116 and 117, SI onto take 117)
- Mono mixing
  - "Sexy Sadie" (remixes 1 – 5 from take 117) – remix 5 released on The Beatles (mono)

==== 22 August 1968 ====
Studio Two, EMI Studios, London, (7.00pm-4.45am)

- Recording
  - "Back in the USSR" (takes 1 – 5)
    - take 5 / Instrumental Backing Track – released as part of The Beatles ("White Album") 50th anniversary edition
- Tape copying
  - "Baby, You're a Rich Man" (of remix mono 1)

==== 23 August 1968 ====
Studio Two, EMI Studios, London, (7.00pm-3.00am)

- Recording
  - "Back in the USSR" (SI onto take 5, tape reduction take 5 into take 6, SI onto take 6)
- Mono mixing
  - "Back in the USSR" (remix 1 – 8 from take 6) – remix 1 released on The Beatles (mono)
- Tape copying
  - "Back in the USSR" (of remix mono 1)
  - "Rocky Raccoon" (of remix mono 1)
  - "Wild Honey Pie" (of remix mono 6)
  - "Mother Nature's Son" (of remix mono 8)
  - "Sexy Sadie" (of remix mono 5)

==== 26 August 1968 ====
Studio Two (control room only), EMI Studios, London, (4.00pm-5.00pm)

- Mono tape copying
  - "Revolution 9" (mono copy 2, from edit of remix stereo 2)

==== 27 August 1968 ====
Studio Two (control room only), EMI Studios, London, (4.00pm-5.00pm)

- Tape copying
  - "Ob-La-Di, Ob-La-Da" (of remix mono 21)
  - "Blackbird" (of remix mono 6)
  - "Not Guilty" (of remix mono 1)
  - "Revolution 9" (of edit of remix stereo 2)

==== 28 August 1968 ====
Trident Studios, Trident House, London (5.00pm-7.00am)

- Recording
  - "Dear Prudence" (take 1)

==== 29 August 1968 ====
Trident Studios, Trident House, London (7.00pm-6.00am)

- Recording
  - "Dear Prudence" (SI onto take 1)

==== 30 August 1968 ====
Trident Studios, Trident House, London (7.00pm-6.00am)

- Recording
  - "Dear Prudence" (SI onto take 1)

==== 3 September 1968 ====
Studio Two, EMI Studios, London, (7.00pm-3.30am)

- Tape copying
  - "While My Guitar Gently Weeps" (take 15 into take 16)
- Recording
  - "While My Guitar Gently Weeps" (SI onto take 16)
- Tape copying
  - "Revolution" (of take 16, rhythm track only)

==== 5 September 1968 ====
Studio Two, EMI Studios, London, (7.00pm-3.45am)

- Recording
  - "While My Guitar Gently Weeps" (SI onto take 16)
  - "While My Guitar Gently Weeps" (Re-remake takes 17 – 44)
    - Let It Be (Unnumbered Rehearsal) – released as part of The Beatles ("White Album") 50th anniversary edition
    - Take 27 – released as part of The Beatles ("White Album") 50th anniversary edition

==== 6 September 1968 ====
Studio Two, EMI Studios, London, (7.00pm-2.00am)

- Recording
  - "While My Guitar Gently Weeps" (SI onto take 25)

==== 9 September 1968 ====
Studio Two, EMI Studios, London, (7.00pm-2.30am)

- Recording
  - "Helter Skelter" (Re-make, takes 4 – 21)
    - (You're So Square) Baby I Don't Care (Studio Jam) – released as part of The Beatles ("White Album") 50th anniversary edition
    - take 17 – released as part of The Beatles ("White Album") 50th anniversary edition

==== 10 September 1968 ====
Studio Two, EMI Studios, London, (7.00pm-3.00am)

- Recording
  - "Helter Skelter" (SI onto take 21)

==== 11 September 1968 ====
Studio Two, EMI Studios, London, (7.00pm-3.30am)

- Recording
  - "Glass Onion" (takes 1 – 34)
    - take 10 – released as part of The Beatles ("White Album") 50th anniversary edition

==== 12 September 1968 ====
Studio Two, EMI Studios, London, (8.30pm-1.30am)

- Recording
  - "Glass Onion" (SI onto take 33)

==== 13 September 1968 ====
Studio Two, EMI Studios, London, (8.00pm-1.45am)

- Recording
  - "Glass Onion" (SI onto take 33)

==== 16 September 1968 ====
Studio Two, EMI Studios, London, (7.00pm-3.00am)

- Recording
  - "I Will" (takes 1 – 67)
    - take 1 – released on Anthology 3
    - take 13 – released as part of The Beatles ("White Album") 50th anniversary edition
      - "Can You Take Me Back?" (Take 1) – released as part of The Beatles ("White Album") 50th anniversary edition
      - "Blue Moon" (Studio Jam played before take 28 of "I Will") – released as part of The Beatles ("White Album") 50th anniversary edition
    - take 29 – released as part of The Beatles ("White Album") 50th anniversary edition
      - "Step Inside Love" (Studio Jam) – released as part of The Beatles ("White Album") 50th anniversary edition
      - "Los Paranoias" (Studio Jam) – released as part of The Beatles ("White Album") 50th anniversary edition
      - "The Way You Look Tonight (improvisation)
- Tape copying
  - "I Will" (take 65 into take 68)
- Recording
  - "Glass Onion" (SI onto take 33)

==== 17 September 1968 ====
Studio Two, EMI Studios, London, (7.00pm-5.00am)

- Mono mixing
  - "Helter Skelter" (remix 1 from take 21) – released on The Beatles (mono)
- Recording
  - "I Will" (SI onto take 68)
- Tape copying
  - "Cry Baby Cry" (take 12 into take 13)

==== 18 September 1968 ====
Studio Two, EMI Studios, London, (5.00pm-4.30am)

- Recording
  - "Birthday" (takes 1 – 20)
    - take 2 / Instrumental Backing Track – released as part of The Beatles ("White Album") 50th anniversary edition
- Tape copying
  - ""Birthday" (take 20 into takes 21 and 22)
- Recording
  - "Birthday" (SI onto take 22)
- Mono mixing
  - "Birthday" (remix 1 from take 22) – released on The Beatles (mono)

==== 19 September 1968 ====
Studios One and Two, EMI Studios, London, (7.15pm-5.30am)

- Recording
  - "Piggies" (takes 1 – 11)

==== 20 September 1968 ====
Studio Two, EMI Studios, London, (7.00pm-11.00pm)

- Tape copying
  - ""Piggies" (take 11 into take 12)
- Recording
  - "Piggies" (SI onto take 12)
    - take 12 / Instrumental Backing Track – released as part of The Beatles ("White Album") 50th anniversary edition

==== 23 September 1968 ====
Studio Two, EMI Studios, London, (7.00pm-3.00am)

- Recording
  - "Happiness Is a Warm Gun" (takes 1 – 45)
    - take 19 – released as part of The Beatles ("White Album") 50th anniversary edition

==== 24 September 1968 ====
Studio Two, EMI Studios, London, (7.00pm-2.00am)

- Recording
  - "Happiness Is a Warm Gun" (takes 46 – 70)

==== 25 September 1968 ====
Studio Two, EMI Studios, London, (7.30pm-6.15am)

- Editing
  - "Happiness Is a Warm Gun" (of takes 53 and 65, called take 65)
- Recording
  - "Happiness Is a Warm Gun" (SI onto take 65)
- Mono mixing
  - "Happiness Is a Warm Gun" (remixes 1 and 2 from take 65)

==== 26 September 1968 ====
Studio Two (Control room only), EMI Studios, London, (7.00pm-1.30am)

- Mono mixing
  - "Happiness Is a Warm Gun" (remixes 3 – 12 from take 65) – remix 12 released on The Beatles (mono)
  - "What's the New Mary Jane" (remixes 1 and 2 from take 4)
  - "Glass Onion" (remixes 1 and 2 from take 33)
  - "I Will" (remixes 1 and 2 from take 68) – remix 2 released on The Beatles (mono)
- Recording
  - "Glass Onion" (Sound effects)

==== 1 October 1968 ====
Trident Studios, Trident House, London (time unknown)

- Recording
  - "Honey Pie" (take 1)
- Mono mixing
  - "Honey Pie" (unnumbered rough remix from take 1)

==== 2 October 1968 ====
Trident Studios, Trident House, London (4.00pm-3.30am)

- Recording
  - "Honey Pie" (SI onto take 1)

==== 3 October 1968 ====
Trident Studios, Trident House, London (time unknown)

- Recording
  - "Savoy Truffle" (take 1)

==== 4 October 1968 ====
Trident Studios, Trident House, London (4.00pm-4.30am)

- Recording
  - "Martha My Dear" (take 1)
  - "Honey Pie" (SI onto take 1)
  - "Martha My Dear" (SI onto take 1)

==== 5 October 1968 ====
Trident Studios, Trident House, London (6.00pm-1.00am)

- Recording
  - "Savoy Truffle" (SI onto take 1)
  - "Martha My Dear" (SI onto take 1)
- Mono mixing
  - "Honey Pie" (remix 1 from take 1) – released on The Beatles (mono)
  - "Martha My Dear" (remix 1 from take 1) – released on The Beatles (mono)
  - "Dear Prudence" (remix 1 from take 1)
- Stereo mixing
  - "Honey Pie" (remix 1 from take 1) – released on The Beatles (stereo)
  - "Martha My Dear" (remix 1 from take 1) – released on The Beatles (stereo)

==== 7 October 1968 ====
Studio Two, EMI Studios, London, (2.30pm-7.00am)

- Tape copying
  - "Honey Pie" (of remix mono 1 and remix stereo 1)
  - "Martha My Dear" (of remix mono 1 and of remix stereo 1)
- Stereo mixing
  - "While My Guitar Gently Weeps" (remix 1 from take 25)
- Mono mixing
  - "While My Guitar Gently Weeps" (remixes 1 and 2 from take 25)
- Recording
  - "Long Long Long" (takes 1 – 67)
    - take 44 – released as part of The Beatles ("White Album") 50th anniversary edition

==== 8 October 1968 ====
Studio Two, EMI Studios, London, (4.00pm-8.00am)

- Recording
  - "Long Long Long" (SI onto take 67)
  - "I'm So Tired" (takes 1 – 14)
    - take 7 – released as part of The Beatles ("White Album") 50th anniversary edition
    - take 14 – released as part of The Beatles ("White Album") 50th anniversary edition
  - "The Continuing Story of Bungalow Bill" (takes 1 – 3)
    - take 2 – released as part of The Beatles ("White Album") 50th anniversary edition

==== 9 October 1968 ====
Studio Two, EMI Studios, London, (7.00pm-5.30am)

- Stereo mixing
  - "The Continuing Story of Bungalow Bill" (remixes 1 and 2 from take 3) – remix 2 released on The Beatles (stereo)
- Mono mixing
  - "The Continuing Story of Bungalow Bill" (remix 1 from take 3) – released on The Beatles (mono)
- Recording
  - "Long Long Long" (SI onto take 67)
- Tape copying
  - "Helter Skelter" (of take 3)

Studio One, EMI Studios, London, (time unknown)

- Recording
  - "Why Don't We Do It in the Road?" (take 1 – 5)
    - take 4 – released on Anthology 3
    - take 5 – released as part of The Beatles ("White Album") 50th anniversary edition

==== 10 October 1968 ====
Studio Two, EMI Studios, London, (7.00pm-7.15am)

- Recording
  - "Piggies" (SI onto take 12)
  - "Glass Onion" (SI onto take 33)
- Stereo mixing
  - "Glass Onion" (remixes 1 and 2 from take 33) – remix 2 released on The Beatles (stereo)
  - "Rocky Raccoon" (remix 1 from take 10) – released on The Beatles (stereo)
  - "Long Long Long" (remixes 1 – 4 from take 67) – remix 4 released on The Beatles (stereo)
- Mono mixing
  - "Glass Onion" (remixes 10 and 11 from take 33) – remix 11 released on The Beatles (mono)

Studio Three, EMI Studios, London, (time unknown)

- Recording
  - "Why Don't We to Do It in the Road" (SI onto take 5, tape reduction take 5 into take 6, SI onto take 6)

==== 11 October 1968 ====
Studio Two, EMI Studios, London, (3.00pm-6.00pm)

- Recording
  - "Savoy Truffle" (SI onto take 1)

Studio Two (control room only), EMI Studios, London, (6.00pm-12.00pm)

- Mono mixing
  - "Piggies" (remixes 1 – 4 from take 12) – remix 4 released on The Beatles (mono)
  - "Don't Pass Me By" (remix 1 from take 7 and edit of edit piece 4) – released on The Beatles (mono)
  - "Good Night" (remixes 1 and 2 from take 34) – remix 2 released on The Beatles (mono)
- Stereo mixing
  - "Piggies" (remixes 1 – 3 from take 12) – remix 3 released on The Beatles (stereo)
  - "Don't Pass Me By" (remix 1 from take 7 and edit of edit piece 4) – released on The Beatles (stereo)
  - "Good Night" (remix 1 from take 34) – released on The Beatles (stereo)

==== 12 October 1968 ====
Studio Two (control room only), EMI Studios, London, (7.00pm-5.45am)

- Stereo mixing
  - "Everybody's Got Something to Hide Except for Me And My Monkey" (remix 1 from take 12) – released on The Beatles (stereo)
  - "Helter Skelter" (remixes 1 – 5 from take 21) – remix 5 released on The Beatles (stereo)
  - "Mother Nature's Son" (remixes 1 and 2 from take 26) – remix 2 released on The Beatles (stereo)
  - "Ob-La-Di, Ob-La-Da" (remixes 1 – 4 from take 23) – remix 4 released on The Beatles (stereo)
- Mono mixing
  - "Everybody's Got Something to Hide Except for Me And My Monkey" (remix 1 from take 12) – released on The Beatles (mono)
  - "Mother Nature's Son" (remixes 1 and 2 from take 26) – remix 2 released on The Beatles (mono)
  - "Ob-La-Di, Ob-La-Da" (remix 10 from take 23) – released on The Beatles (mono)
  - "Long Long Long" (remix 1 from take 67)

==== 13 October 1968 ====
Studio Two, EMI Studios, London, (7.00pm-6.00am)

- Recording
  - "Julia" (takes 1 – 3)
    - Two Rehearsals – released as part of The Beatles ("White Album") 50th anniversary edition
    - Take 2 – released on Anthology 3
- Stereo mixing
  - "Julia" (remix 1 from take 3) – released on The Beatles (stereo)
  - "Dear Prudence" (remix 1 from take 1) – released on The Beatles (stereo)
  - "Wild Honey Pie" (remixes 1 and 2 from take 1) – remix 2 released on The Beatles (stereo)
  - "Back in the USSR" (remix 1 from take 6) – released on The Beatles (stereo)
  - "Blackbird" (remix 1 from take 32) – released on The Beatles (stereo)
- Mono mixing
  - "Julia" (remix 1 from take 3) – released on The Beatles (mono)
  - "Dear Prudence" (remixes 1 – 5 from take 1) – remix 5 released on The Beatles (mono)
  - "Blackbird" (remix 10 from take 32) – released on The Beatles (mono)

==== 14 October 1968 ====
Studio Two, EMI Studios, London, (7.00pm-7.30am)

- Recording
  - "Savoy Truffle" (SI onto take 1)
- Stereo mixing
  - "I Will" (remix 1 from take 68) – released on The Beatles (stereo)
  - "Birthday" (remix 1 from take 22) – released on The Beatles (stereo)
  - "Savoy Truffle" (remixes 1 and 2 from take 1) – remix 1 or 2 released on The Beatles (stereo)
  - "While My Guitar Gently Weeps" (remixes 10 – 12 from take 25) – released on The Beatles (stereo)
  - "Yer Blues" (remixes 1 – 5 from take 16 and 17 and edit piece 1) – remix 3 released on The Beatles (stereo)
  - "Sexy Sadie" (remixes 1 – 3 from take 117) – released on The Beatles (stereo)
  - "What's the New Mary Jane" (remixes 1 and 2 from take 4)
- Mono mixing
  - "Savoy Truffle" (remixes 1 – 6 from take 1) – released on The Beatles (mono)
  - "While My Guitar Gently Weeps" (remixes 10 and 11 from take 25) – remix 10 or 11 released on The Beatles (mono)
  - "Long Long Long" (remixes 2 and 3 from take 67) – remix 2 or 3 released on The Beatles (mono)

==== 15 October 1968 ====
Studio Two, EMI Studios, London, (6.00pm-8.00pm)

- Stereo mixing
  - "Happiness Is a Warm Gun" (remixes 1 – 4 from take 65) – released on The Beatles (stereo)
  - "I'm So Tired" (remixes 1 – 5 from take 14) – released on The Beatles (stereo)
  - "Cry Baby Cry" (remixes 1 – 3 from take 12) – released on The Beatles (stereo)
- Mono mixing
  - "I'm So Tired" (remixes 1 – 3 from take 14) – released on The Beatles (mono)
  - "Cry Baby Cry" (remix 1 from take 12) – released on The Beatles (mono)

==== 16 and 17 October 1968 ====
Studios One, Two and Three and rooms 41 and 42, EMI Studios, London, (5.00pm-5.00pm)

- Mono mixing
  - "Crossfades and edits for LP
  - "Why Don't We Do It in the Road" (remix 1 from take 6) – released on The Beatles (mono)
- Stereo mixing
  - "Crossfades and edits for LP
  - "Why Don't We Do It in the Road" (remix 1 from take 6) – released on The Beatles (stereo)

Studios Two (Control room only), EMI Studios, London, (time unknown)

- Tape copying
  - "It's All Too Much" (of take 2, called take 196)
- Mono mixing
  - "It's All Too Much" (remix 1 from take 196) – used in Yellow Submarine (film); included on Mono Masters
- Stereo mixing
  - "It's All Too Much" (remix 1 from take 196) – released on Yellow Submarine (stereo)

==== 18 October 1968 ====
Studios One (Control room only), EMI Studios, London, (12.00pm-1.00pm)

- Tape copying
  - "Yer Blues" (of edit of remix mono 3 and edit piece take 1)
  - "Don't Pass Me By" (of remix mono 1)

=== Yellow Submarine session ===
==== 29 October 1968 ====
Studio Three (control room only), EMI Studios, London (10.00am-1.00pm)

- Stereo mixing
  - "Hey Bulldog" (remixes 1–3, from take 10) – released on Yellow Submarine (stereo)
  - "All Together Now" (remix 1, from take 9) – released on Yellow Submarine (stereo)
  - "All You Need Is Love" (remixes 1–6, from take 58) – released on Yellow Submarine (stereo); included on Magical Mystery Tour (stereo)
  - "Only a Northern Song" (remix 1, from remix mono 6) – released on Yellow Submarine (stereo)
- Personnel
  - Production staff: Geoff Emerick (engineer), Graham Kirkby (2nd engineer)

== 1969 ==
=== Get Back album sessions ===
There are no take numbers since they were not formal studio recording sessions, but rehearsals filmed for Let It Be. Some of the songs were released on later Beatles or solo records.

Songs (arranged by artist):

- Arthur Alexander
  - A Shot of Rhythm and Blues
  - Soldier of Love (Lay Down Your Arms)
- Louis Armstrong
  - Hello, Dolly!
- The Band
  - I Shall Be Released
  - The Weight
  - To Kingdom Come
- Richard Barret
  - Some Other Guy
- The Beatles
  - All Together Now
  - All I Want Is You (not the same as "Dig a Pony")
  - Back in the U.S.S.R.
  - Because I Know You Love Me So
  - Blues Jam
  - Carry That Weight
  - The Castle Of The King Of The Birds
  - Commonwealth
  - Cupcake Baby
  - Dig a Pony
  - Dig It
  - Don't Let Me Down
  - Enoch Powell
  - Every Little Thing
  - Everybody Got Soul
  - For You Blue
  - Freakout Jam (Featuring Yoko Ono)
  - From Me to You
  - Get Back
  - Get Off (Winston, Richard, John; White Power)
  - Golden Slumbers
  - Help!
  - Her Majesty
  - I Bought A Piano The Other Day
  - I Fancy Me Chances with You
  - I Me Mine
  - I Told You Before (Featuring Heather)
  - I Want You (She's So Heavy)
  - I'll Get You
  - I'll Wait Till Tomorrow
  - I've Been Thinking That You Love Me
  - I've Got a Feeling
  - The Inner Light
  - Jam (Featuring Yoko Ono)
  - Jazz Piano Piece
  - Just Fun
  - Lady Madonna
  - Let It Be
  - The Long and Winding Road
  - Love Me Do
  - Madman
  - Martha My Dear
  - Maxwell's Silver Hammer
  - Mean Mr. Mustard
  - My Imagination
  - Norwegian Wood (This Bird Has Flown)
  - Ob-La-Di, Ob-La-Da
  - Octopus's Garden
  - Oh! Darling
  - Old Brown Shoe
  - One After 909
  - Paul's Piano Intro (adaptation of Adagio for Strings)
  - Piano Piece (Bonding)
  - Please Please Me
  - Revolution
  - The River Rhine
  - There You Are, Eddie
  - Run for Your Life
  - Sexy Sadie
  - Shakin' in the Sixties
  - She Came in Through the Bathroom Window
  - She Said She Said
  - Something
  - Song of Love
  - Strawberry Fields Forever
  - Sun King
  - Suzy Parker
  - Thinking of Linking
  - Too Bad About Sorrows
  - Two of Us
  - Water! Water!
  - Won't You Please Say Goodbye
  - Window, Window
  - You Can't Do That
  - You Know My Name (Look Up the Number)
  - You Wear Your Women Out
- Irving Berlin
  - A Pretty Girl Is Like a Melody
- Chuck Berry
  - Almost Grown
  - Brown-Eyed Handsome Man
  - Carol
  - I Got to Find My Baby
  - I'm Talkin' 'Bout You
  - Johnny B. Goode
  - Little Queenie
  - Maybellene
  - No Particular Place to Go
  - Rock and Roll Music
  - School Days (Ring Ring Goes the Bell)
  - Sweet Little Sixteen
  - Thirty Days
  - You Can't Catch Me
- The Beach Boys
  - Loop De Loop
- Euday L. Bowman
  - Twelfth Street Rag
- The Everly Brothers
  - Bye Bye Love
  - Cathy's Clown
- The Isley Brothers
  - Shout!
  - Twist and Shout
- Roy Brown
  - Good Rockin' Tonight
- James Brown
  - Papa's Got a Brand New Bag
- Johnny Cash
  - Flushed from the Bathroom of Your Heart
- Ray Charles
  - Hallelujah, I Love Her So
  - What'd I Say?
- The Coasters
  - Three Cool Cats
- Eddie Cochran
  - C'mon Everybody
  - Somethin' Else
  - Twenty Flight Rock
- Sam Cooke
  - Bring It on Home to Me
- Bo Diddley
  - Bo Diddley
  - I'm a Man
- Lonnie Donegan
  - Rock Island Line
- Richard Drapkin
  - Devil in Her Heart
- The Drifters
  - Save the Last Dance for Me
  - Stand by Me
- Bob Dylan
  - All Along the Watchtower
  - Blowin' in the Wind
  - I Shall Be Released
  - I Threw It All Away
  - I Want You
  - It Ain't Me, Babe
  - Stuck Inside of Mobile with the Memphis Blues Again
  - Mama, You Been on My Mind
  - My Back Pages
  - Please, Mrs. Henry
  - Positively Fourth Street
  - Mighty Quinn (Quinn, the Eskimo)
  - Rainy Day Women ♯12 & 35
- Donnie Elbert
  - A Little Piece of Leather
- Georgie Fame
  - The Ballad of Bonnie and Clyde
- Emile Ford (McCarthy/Johnson/Monaco)
  - What Do You Want to Make Those Eyes at Me for?
- Erma Franklin
  - Piece of My Heart
- Jesse Fuller
  - San Francisco Bay Blues
- Marvin Gaye
  - Hitch Hike
- W. C. Handy
  - St. Louis Blues
- Richard Harris
  - MacArthur Park
- George Harrison
  - All Things Must Pass
  - Hear Me, Lord
  - Isn't It a Pity
  - Let It Down
- Screamin' Jay Hawkins
  - Little Demon
- Buddy Holly
  - Mailman, Bring Me No More Blues
  - Not Fade Away
  - Peggy Sue Got Married
  - That'll Be the Day
- Robert Johnson
  - Milk Cow Blues
- Louis Jordan
  - What's the Use of Getting Sober
- Aram Khachaturian
  - Sabre Dance
- John Lennon
  - A Case of the Blues
  - Child of Nature (On the Road to Rishikesh; early "Jealous Guy")
  - Gimme Some Truth
- Jerry Lee Lewis
  - Fools like Me
  - Great Balls of Fire
  - High School Confidential
- Jackie Lomax
  - Little Yellow Pills
- Paul McCartney
  - Another Day
  - Every Night
  - Junk
  - Step Inside Love
  - Suicide
  - Teddy Boy
  - The Back Seat of My Car
- Jimmy McCracklin
  - The Walk
- Gerry and the Pacemakers
  - Don't Let the Sun Catch You Crying
- Carl Perkins
  - Blue Suede Shoes
  - Gone Gone Gone
  - Sure to Fall (In Love with You)
- Cole Porter
  - True Love
- Elvis Presley
  - All Shook Up
  - Baby Let's Play House
  - Don't Be Cruel
  - That's Alright (Mama)
- Lloyd Price
  - Lawdy Miss Clawdy
- Speckled Red
  - The Right String (But the Wrong Yo-Yo)
- Cliff Richard
  - Move It
- Little Richard
  - Long Tall Sally
  - Lucille
  - Miss Ann
  - Rip It Up
- Jimmie Rodgers
  - Blue Yodel No. 1
- Smokey Robinson and the Miracles
  - The Tracks of My Tears
  - You Really Got a Hold on Me
- Chan Romero
  - The Hippy Hippy Shake
- The Four Seasons
  - C'mon Marianne
- The Shadows
  - F.B.I.
- Moises Simons
  - Peanut Vendor
- Ringo Starr
  - Taking a Trip to Carolina
- Leiber/Stoller
  - Kansas City
- Barret Strong
  - Money (That's What I Want)
- Traditional (Public Domain)
  - Baa Baa Black Sheep
  - Frere Jacques
  - God Save the Queen
  - Hare Krishna Mantra (Harry Pinsker)
  - Hava Negeilah Blues
  - Hello Muddah, Hello Fadduh
  - House of the Rising Sun
  - Long Lost John
  - Maggie Mae
  - Michael, Row the Boat Ashore
  - Midnight Special
  - Rule, Britannia!
  - Take This Hammer
  - Turkey in the Straw
  - When Irish Eyes Are Smiling
  - When the Saints Go Marching In
- Tommy Tucker
  - Hi-Heel Sneakers
- Big Joe Turner
  - Honey Hush
  - Shake, Rattle And Roll
- Conway Twitty
  - It's Only Make Believe
- Consuelo Velázquez
  - Bésame Mucho
- Gene Vincent and his Blue Caps
  - Be-Bop-a-Lula
- Frederick Weatherly
  - Danny Boy
- Lenny Welch (Marlow/Scott)
  - A Taste of Honey
- Kurt Weill
  - Mack The Knife
- Sonny Boy Williams
  - One Way Out
- Hank Williams
  - Hey Good Lookin'
  - You Win Again
- Larry Williams
  - Bad Boy
  - Dizzy Miss Lizzy
  - Short Fat Fannie
- Meredith Willson
  - Till There Was You

Numerous improvisations were also recorded during these sessions.

==== Medleys ====
- "Little Demon" (Screamin' Jay Hawkins)/"Maybellene" (Berry)/"You Can't Catch Me" (Berry)/"Brown-Eyed Handsome Man" (Berry)
  - Recorded 24 January 1969, at 3 Savile Row.
- "Blue Suede Shoes" (Perkins)/"You Really Got a Hold on Me" (Robinson)
  - Recorded 26 January 1969 at 3 Savile Row.
- "Rip It Up" (Blackwell-Marascalco)/"Shake, Rattle, And Roll" (Calhoun)
  - Recorded 26 January 1969 at 3 Savile Row. Although Anthology 3 places this medley and the above together, they were recorded separately, but on the same day.
- "Cannonball"/"Not Fade Away" (Hardin-Petty)/"Hey Little Girl"/"Bo Diddley" (McDaniel)
  - Recorded 29 January 1969 at 3 Savile Row.
- "Take This Hammer" (Traditional)/"Long Lost John" (Traditional)/"Black Dog Blues" (also known as "Daddy, Where You Been So Long?")/"The Right String (But the Wrong Yo-Yo)" (Speckled Red)/"Run for Your Life"
  - Recorded at 3 Savile Row.
- "Kansas City" (Leiber-Stoller)/"Miss Ann" (Penniman-Johnson)/"Lawdy Miss Clawdy" (Price)
  - Recorded 26 January 1969, at 3 Savile Row.
- "All Shook Up" (Blackwell-Presley)/"Your True Love"/"Blue Suede Shoes" (Perkins)
  - Recorded 3 January 1969, at Twickenham Film Studios..
- "Ramblin' Woman"/"I Threw It All Away" (Dylan)/"Mama, You Been on My Mind" (Dylan)
  - Recorded 9 January 1969, at Twickenham Film Studios.
- "Sausages and French Fries" (Lennon–McCartney–Harrison–Starr)/"Early in the Morning"/"Honey Hush" (Turner)
  - Recorded 8 January 1969 at Twickenham Film Studios.
- "I've Got a Feeling"/"Help!"/"Please Please Me"
  - Recorded 23 January 1969, at 3 Savile Row.
- "I'm Ready" (Domino; also known as "Rocker")/"Save the Last Dance for Me" (Pomus-Shuman)/"Don't Let Me Down"
  - Recorded at 3 Savile Row.

=== Abbey Road and "The Ballad of John And Yoko" single sessions ===
==== 22 February 1969 ====
Trident Studios, Trident House, London (time unknown)

- Recording
  - "I Want You (She's So Heavy)" (takes 1–35)
- Production Staff: Glyn Johns (Producer), Barry Sheffield (Engineer), unknown (2nd Engineer)

==== 23 February 1969 ====
Trident Studios, Trident House, London (time unknown)

- Editing
  - "I Want You (She's So Heavy)" (unnumbered master from takes 9, 20 and 32)
- Production Staff: Glyn Johns (Producer), Barry Sheffield (Engineer), unknown (2nd Engineer)

==== 24 February 1969 ====
Trident Studios, Trident House, London (time unknown)

- Tape copying
  - "I Want You (She's So Heavy)" (of unnumbered master)
- Production Staff: N/A (Producer), Barry Sheffield (Engineer), unknown (2nd Engineer)

==== 25 February 1969 ====
Studio unknown, EMI Studios, London (time unknown)

- Recording
  - "Old Brown Shoe" (takes 1 and 2)
    - "Old Brown Shoe" (demo) – Released on Anthology 3
  - "All Things Must Pass" (takes 1 and 2)
    - "All Things Must Pass" (demo) – Released on Anthology 3
  - "Something" (demo, take 1) – Released on Anthology 3 and on Abbey Road 50th Anniversary Super Deluxe Edition
- Production Staff: N/A (Producer), Ken Scott (Engineer and 2nd Engineer)

==== 14 April 1969 ====
Studio Three, EMI Studios, London, (2.30pm-11.00pm)

- Recording
  - "The Ballad of John and Yoko" (takes 1 – 11)
    - take 7 – Released on Abbey Road 50th Anniversary Super Deluxe Edition
- Stereo Mixing
  - "The Ballad of John and Yoko" (remixes 1 – 5 from take 10) – released as a single; included on Past Masters
- Production Staff: George Martin (Producer), Geoff Emerick (Engineer), John Kurlander (2nd Engineer)

==== 16 April 1969 ====
Studio Three, EMI Studios, London, (2.30pm-5.00pm)

- Recording
  - "Old Brown Shoe" (demo, take 1)
- Production Staff: George Martin (Producer), Phil McDonald (Engineer), Richard Lush (2nd Engineer)

Studio Three, EMI Studios, London, (7.00pm-2.45am)

- Recording
  - "Old Brown Shoe" (takes 1 – 4)
    - take 2 – Released on Abbey Road 50th Anniversary Super Deluxe Edition
  - "Something" (takes 1 – 13)
- Stereo Mixing
  - "Old Brown Shoe" (remixes 1 – 3 from take 4)
- Production Staff: George Martin (Producer), Jeff Jarratt (Engineer), Richard Lush (2nd Engineer)

==== 18 April 1969 ====
Studio Three, EMI Studios, London, (2.30pm-1.00am)

- Recording
  - "Old Brown Shoe" (SI onto take 4)
- Stereo Mixing
  - "Old Brown Shoe" (remixes 5 – 23 from take 4) – released as the B-side to "The Ballad of John and Yoko"; included on Past Masters

Studio Two, EMI Studios, London, (1.00am-4.30am)

- Recording
  - "I Want You (She's So Heavy)" (SI onto unnumbered master, reduction of unnumbered master called take 1, SI onto take 1)
- Stereo Mixing
  - "I Want You (She's So Heavy)" (unnumbered rough mix from take 1)
- Production Staff: Chris Thomas (Producer), Jeff Jarratt (Engineer), John Kurlander (2nd Engineer)

==== 20 April 1969 ====
Studio Three, EMI Studios, London, (7.00pm-12.45am)

- Recording
  - "I Want You (She's So Heavy)" (SI onto take 1)
  - "Oh! Darling" (takes 1–26)
    - take 4 – Released on Abbey Road 50th Anniversary Super Deluxe Edition
- Stereo Mixing
  - "Oh! Darling" (remix 1 from take 26)
- Production Staff: Chris Thomas (Producer), Jeff Jarratt (Engineer), John Kurlander (2nd Engineer)

==== 26 April 1969 ====
Studio Two, EMI Studios, London, (4.30pm-4.15am)

- Recording
  - "Oh! Darling" (SI onto take 26)
  - "Octopus's Garden" (takes 1–32)
    - take 2 – Released on Anthology 3
    - take 9 – Released on Abbey Road 50th Anniversary Super Deluxe Edition
- Production Staff: Chris Thomas (Producer), Jeff Jarratt (Engineer), Richard Langham (2nd Engineer)

==== 29 April 1969 ====
Studio Three, EMI Studios, London, (7.30pm-1.00am)

- Recording
  - "Octopus's Garden" (SI onto take 32)
- Stereo Mixing
  - "Octopus's Garden" (remixes 1 – 4 from take 32)
- Production Staff: Chris Thomas (Producer), Jeff Jarratt (Engineer), Nick Webb (2nd Engineer)

==== 1 May 1969 ====
Studio Three (control room only), EMI Studios, London, (2.30pm-7.00pm)

- Stereo Mixing
  - "Oh! Darling" (remixes 2 – 4 from take 26)
- Production Staff: Chris Thomas (Producer), Jeff Jarratt (Engineer), Nick Webb (2nd Engineer)

==== 2 May 1969 ====
Studio Three, EMI Studios, London, (7.00pm-3.40am)

- Recording
  - "Something" (re-make, takes 1 – 36)
- Production Staff: Chris Thomas (Producer), Jeff Jarratt (Engineer), Nick Webb (2nd Engineer)

==== 5 May 1969 ====
Studio One, Olympic Sound Studios, London (7.30pm-4.00am)

- Recording
  - "Something" (SI onto take 36)
- Production Staff: George Martin (Producer), Glyn Johns (Engineer), Steve Vaughan (2nd Engineer)

==== 6 May 1969 ====
Studio One, Olympic Sound Studios, London (3.00pm-4.00am)

- Recording
  - "You Never Give Me Your Money" (takes 1–36)
    - take 36 – Released on Abbey Road 50th Anniversary Super Deluxe Edition
- Stereo Mixing
  - "You Never Give Me Your Money" (remix 1 from take 30)
- Production Staff: George Martin (Producer), Glyn Johns (Engineer), Steve Vaughan (2nd Engineer)

==== 1 July 1969 ====
Studio Two, EMI Studios, London (3.00pm-7.30pm)

- Recording
  - "You Never Give Me Your Money" (SI onto take 30)
- Production Staff: George Martin (Producer), Phil McDonald (Engineer), Chris Blair (2nd Engineer)

==== 2 July 1969 ====
Studio Two, EMI Studios, London (3.00pm-9.30pm)

- Recording
  - "Her Majesty" (takes 1–3)
    - takes 1–3 – Released on Abbey Road 50th Anniversary Super Deluxe Edition
  - "Golden Slumbers/Carry That Weight" (takes 1–15)
    - takes 1-3 – Released on Abbey Road 50th Anniversary Super Deluxe Edition
- Production Staff: George Martin (Producer), Phil McDonald (Engineer), Chris Blair (2nd Engineer)

==== 3 July 1969 ====
Studio Two, EMI Studios, London (3.00pm-8.30pm)

- Editing
  - "Golden Slumbers/Carry That Weight" (of takes 13 and 15 called take 13)
- Recording
  - "Golden Slumbers/Carry That Weight" (SI onto take 13, tape reduction take 13 into takes 16 and 17)
- Production Staff: George Martin (Producer), Phil McDonald (Engineer), Chris Blair (2nd Engineer)

==== 4 July 1969 ====
Studio Two, EMI Studios, London (2.45pm-5.30pm)

- Recording
  - "Golden Slumbers/Carry That Weight" (SI onto take 17)
- Production Staff: George Martin (Producer), Phil McDonald (Engineer), Chris Blair (2nd Engineer)

==== 7 July 1969 ====
Studio Two, EMI Studios, London (2.30pm-11.45pm)

- Recording
  - "Here Comes the Sun" (takes 1–13)
    - take 9 – Released on Abbey Road 50th Anniversary Super Deluxe Edition
- Production Staff: George Martin (Producer), Phil McDonald (Engineer), John Kurlander (2nd Engineer)

==== 8 July 1969 ====
Studio Two, EMI Studios, London (2.30pm-11.15pm)

- Recording
  - "Here Comes the Sun" (SI onto take 13, tape reduction take 13 into takes 14 and 15)
- Mono Mixing
  - "Here Comes the Sun" (unnumbered rough remix from take 15)
- Production Staff: George Martin (Producer), Phil McDonald (Engineer), John Kurlander (2nd Engineer)

==== 9 July 1969 ====
Studio Two, EMI Studios, London (2.30pm-10.15pm)

- Recording
  - "Maxwell's Silver Hammer" (takes 1–21)
    - take 5 – Released on Anthology 3
    - take 12 – Released on Abbey Road 50th Anniversary Super Deluxe Edition
- Production Staff: George Martin (Producer), Phil McDonald (Engineer), John Kurlander (2nd Engineer)

==== 10 July 1969 ====
Studio Two, EMI Studios, London (2.30pm-11.30pm)

- Recording
  - "Maxwell's Silver Hammer" (SI onto take 21)
- Stereo Mixing
  - "Maxwell's Silver Hammer" (remixes 1 – 13 from take 21)
- Production Staff: George Martin (Producer), Phil McDonald (Engineer), John Kurlander (2nd Engineer)

==== 11 July 1969 ====
Studio Two, EMI Studios, London (2.30pm-12.00pm)

- Recording
  - "Maxwell's Silver Hammer" (SI onto take 21)
  - "Something" (SI onto take 36)
- Stereo Mixing
  - "Something" (remixes 1 – 4 from take 36)
- Recording
  - "Something" (tape reduction take 36 into take 37)
  - "You Never Give Me Your Money" (SI onto take 30)
- Production Staff: George Martin (Producer), Phil McDonald (Engineer), John Kurlander (2nd Engineer)

==== 15 July 1969 ====
Studio Three, EMI Studios, London (2.30pm-6.00pm)

- Recording
  - "You Never Give Me Your Money" (SI onto take 30)

Studio Two (control room only), EMI Studios, London (6.00pm-11.00pm)

- Stereo Mixing
  - "You Never Give Me Your Money" (remixes 1 – 6 from take 30)
- Production Staff: George Martin (Producer), Phil McDonald (Engineer), Alan Parsons (2nd Engineer)

==== 16 July 1969 ====
Studio Three, EMI Studios, London (2.30pm-7.00pm)

- Recording
  - "Here Comes the Sun" (SI onto take 15)

Studio Two, EMI Studios, London (7.00pm-12.30am)

- Recording
  - "Something" (SI onto take 36, tape reduction take 36 into takes 38 and 39)
- Production Staff: George Martin (Producer), Phil McDonald (Engineer), Alan Parsons (2nd Engineer)

==== 17 July 1969 ====
Studio Three, EMI Studios, London (2.30pm-6.30pm)

- Recording
  - "Oh! Darling" (SI onto take 16)

Studio Two, EMI Studios, London (6.30pm-11.15pm)

- Recording
  - "Octopus's Garden" (SI onto take 32)
- Production Staff: George Martin (Producer), Phil McDonald (Engineer), Alan Parsons (2nd Engineer)

==== 18 July 1969 ====
Studio Three, EMI Studios, London (2.30pm-8.00pm)

- Recording
  - "Oh! Darling" (SI onto take 26)
  - "Octopus's Garden" (SI onto take 32)

Studio Two (control room only), EMI Studios, London (8.30pm-10.30pm)

- Mono mixing
  - "Octopus's Garden" (remixes 1 – 7 from take 32)
- Stereo mixing
  - "Octopus's Garden" (remixes 10 – 14 from take 32) – released on Abbey Road
- Production Staff: George Martin (Producer), Phil McDonald (Engineer), Alan Parsons (2nd Engineer)

==== 21 July 1969 ====
Studio Three, EMI Studios, London (2.30pm-9.30pm)

- Recording
  - "Come Together" (takes 1–8)
    - take 1 – Released on Anthology 3
    - take 5 – Released on Abbey Road 50th Anniversary Super Deluxe Edition

Studio Two (control room only), EMI Studios, London (9.30pm-10.00pm)

- Tape copying
  - "Come Together" (of take 6 called take 9)
- Production Staff: George Martin (Producer), Geoff Emerick/Phil McDonald (Engineer), John Kurlander (2nd Engineer)

==== 22 July 1969 ====
Studio Three, EMI Studios, London (2.30pm-9.30pm)

- Recording
  - "Oh! Darling" (SI onto take 26)
  - "Come Together" (SI onto take 9)
- Production Staff: George Martin (Producer), Geoff Emerick/Phil McDonald (Engineer), John Kurlander (2nd Engineer)

==== 23 July 1969 ====
Studio Three, EMI Studios, London (2.30pm-11.30pm)

- Recording
  - "Oh! Darling" (SI onto take 26)
  - "Come Together" (SI onto take 9)
  - "The End" (takes 1 -7)
    - take 3 – Released on Abbey Road 50th Anniversary Super Deluxe Edition
    - remix – Released on Anthology 3 (with edited version of final chord from "A Day in the Life")
- Production Staff: George Martin (Producer), Geoff Emerick/Phil McDonald (Engineer), John Kurlander (2nd Engineer)

==== 24 July 1969 ====
Studio Two, EMI Studios, London (2.30pm-10.30pm)

- Recording
  - "Come and Get It" (take 1) – Released on Anthology 3 and Abbey Road 50th Anniversary Super Deluxe Edition
- Stereo mixing
  - "Come and Get It" (remix 1 from take 1)
- Tape copying
  - "Come and Get It" (of stereo remix 1)
- Recording
  - "Sun King"/"Mean Mr. Mustard" (takes 1–35)
    - take 20 – Released on Abbey Road 50th Anniversary Super Deluxe Edition
  - "Who Slapped John?", "Be-Bop-A-Lula", "Ain't She Sweet" (Studio Jams)
    - "Ain't She Sweet" – Released on Anthology 3
- Production Staff: George Martin (Producer), Geoff Emerick/Phil McDonald (Engineer), John Kurlander (2nd Engineer)

==== 25 July 1969 ====
Studio Two, EMI Studios, London (2.30pm-2.30am)

- Recording
  - "Sun King/Mean Mr. Mustard" (SI onto take 35)
  - "Come Together" (SI onto take 9)
  - "Polythene Pam"/"She Came in Through the Bathroom Window" (takes 1–39)
    - take 27 – Released on Abbey Road 50th Anniversary Super Deluxe Edition
- Production Staff: George Martin (Producer), Geoff Emerick/Phil McDonald (Engineer), John Kurlander (2nd Engineer)

==== 28 July 1969 ====
Studio Three, EMI Studios, London (2.30pm-8.30pm)

- Recording
  - "Polythene Pam/She Came in Through the Bathroom Window (SI onto take 39)

Studio Two (control room only), EMI Studios, London (8.00pm-8.30pm)

- Recording
  - "Polythene Pam/She Came in Through the Bathroom Window (tape reduction take 39 into take 40)
- Production Staff: George Martin (Producer), Geoff Emerick/Phil McDonald (Engineer), John Kurlander (2nd Engineer)

==== 29 July 1969 ====
Studio Three, EMI Studios, London (2.30pm-10.45pm)

- Recording
  - "Come Together" (SI onto take 9)
  - "Sun King/Mean Mr. Mustard" (SI onto take 35)
- Production Staff: George Martin (Producer), Geoff Emerick/Phil McDonald (Engineer), John Kurlander (2nd Engineer)

==== 30 July 1969 ====
Studio Two (control room only), EMI Studios, London (2.00pm-2.30am)

- Recording
  - "You Never Give Me Your Money" (tape reduction take 30 into takes 37 – 42)
  - "Come Together" (SI onto take 9)
  - "Polythene Pam/She Came in Through the Bathroom Window (SI onto take 40)
  - "You Never Give Me Your Money" (SI onto take 40)
  - "Golden Slumbers/Carry That Weight" (SI onto take 17)
- Stereo Mixing
  - "You Never Give Me Your Money" (remix 1 from take 40)
  - "Sun King/Mean Mr. Mustard" (remix 1 from take 35)
  - "Her Majesty" (remix 1 from take 3)
  - "Polythene Pam/She Came in Through the Bathroom Window (remix 1 from take 40)
  - "Golden Slumbers/Carry That Weight" (remix 1 from take 17)
  - "The End" (remix 1 from take 7)
  - Editing, crossfading and tape compilation Abbey Road Medley
    - "The Long One" (trial mix) – Released on Abbey Road 50th Anniversary Super Deluxe Edition
    - "Her Majesty" (from remix 1) – released on Abbey Road
- Production Staff: George Martin (Producer), Geoff Emerick/Phil McDonald (Engineer), John Kurlander (2nd Engineer)

==== 31 July 1969 ====
Studio Two, EMI Studios, London (2.30pm-1.15am)

- Recording
  - "You Never Give Me Your Money" (SI onto 30)
  - "Golden Slumbers/Carry That Weight" (SI onto take 17)
- Production Staff: George Martin (Producer), Geoff Emerick/Phil McDonald (Engineer), John Kurlander (2nd Engineer)

==== 1 August 1969 ====
Studio Two, EMI Studios, London (2.30pm-10.30pm)

- Recording
  - "Because" (takes 1-23, SI onto take 16)
    - take 1 / instrumental – Released on Abbey Road 50th Anniversary Super Deluxe Edition
    - take 16 / a cappella – Released on Anthology 3
- Production Staff: George Martin (Producer), Geoff Emerick/Phil McDonald (Engineer), John Kurlander (2nd Engineer)

==== 4 August 1969 ====
Studio Two, EMI Studios, London (2.30pm-9.00pm)

- Recording
  - "Because (SI onto take 16)
- Production Staff: George Martin (Producer), Geoff Emerick/Phil McDonald (Engineer), John Kurlander (2nd Engineer)

Studio Three (control room only), EMI Studios, London (7.15pm-8.45pm)

- Stereo Mixing
  - "Something" (unnumbered rough mix from take 39)
  - "Here Comes the Sun" (unnumbered rough mix from take 15)
- Production Staff: George Harrison (Producer), Phil McDonald (Engineer), Alan Parsons (2nd Engineer)

==== 5 August 1969 ====
Studio Three (control room only), EMI Studios, London (2.30pm-6.30pm)

- Recording
  - "You Never Give Me Your Money" (sound effects takes 1 – 5)

Room 43 and Studio Two, EMI Studios, London (6.30pm-10.45pm)

- Recording
  - "Because (SI onto take 16)
  - "The End" (SI onto take 7)
- Production Staff: George Martin (Producer), Geoff Emerick/Phil McDonald (Engineer), John Kurlander (2nd Engineer)

==== 6 August 1969 ====
Studio Three, EMI Studios, London (2.30pm-11.00pm)

- Recording
  - "Here Comes the Sun" (SI onto take 15)
- Production Staff: George Martin (Producer), Phil McDonald (Engineer), Alan Parsons (2nd Engineer)

Room 43 and Studio Two, EMI Studios, London (2.30pm-1.00am)

- Recording
  - "Maxwell's Silver Hammer" (tape reduction takes 21 into takes 22–27 with simultaneous SI)
- Stereo Mixing
  - "Maxwell's Silver Hammer" (remixes 14 – 26 from take 27)
- Production Staff: George Martin (Producer), Tony Clark/Phil McDonald (Engineer), John Kurlander (2nd Engineer)

==== 7 August 1969 ====
Studio Two (control room only), EMI Studios, London (2.30pm-6.00pm)

- Stereo Mixing
  - "Come Together" (remixes 1 – 10 from take 9) – remix 1 released on Abbey Road

Studio Three, EMI Studios, London (6.00pm-12.00am)

- Recording
  - "The End" (SI onto take 7)
- Production Staff: George Martin (Producer), Geoff Emerick/Phil McDonald (Engineer), John Kurlander (2nd Engineer)

==== 8 August 1969 ====
Studio Two, EMI Studios, London (2.30pm-9.00pm)

- Recording
  - "The End" (SI onto take 7)
  - "I Want You (She's So Heavy)" (SI onto unnumbered master)
- Production Staff: George Martin (Producer), Geoff Emerick/Phil McDonald (Engineer), John Kurlander (2nd Engineer)

Studio Three, EMI Studios, London (5.30pm-9.45pm)

- Recording
  - "Oh! Darling" (SI onto take 26)
- Production Staff: George Martin (Producer), Tony Clark (Engineer), Alan Parsons (2nd Engineer)

==== 11 August 1969 ====
Studio Two, EMI Studios, London (2.30pm-11.30pm)

- Recording
  - "I Want You (She's So Heavy)" (SI onto take 1)
  - "Oh! Darling" (SI onto take 26)
  - "Here Comes the Sun" (SI onto take 15)
- Tape copying
  - "I Want You (She's So Heavy)" (of take 1)
- Editing
  - "I Want You (She's So Heavy)" (from take 1 into unnumbered master)
- Production Staff: George Martin (Producer), Geoff Emerick/Phil McDonald (Engineer), John Kurlander (2nd Engineer)

==== 12 August 1969 ====
Studio Two (control room only), EMI Studios, London (7.00pm-2.00am)

- Stereo Mixing
  - "Oh! Darling" (remixes 5 – 9 from take 26) – remix 9 released on Abbey Road
  - "Because" (remixes 1 and 2 from take 16) – remix 2 released on Abbey Road
  - "Maxwell's Silver Hammer" (remixes 27 – 36 from take 27)
- Production Staff: George Martin (Producer), Geoff Emerick/Phil McDonald (Engineer), John Kurlander (2nd Engineer)

==== 13 August 1969 ====
Studio Two (control room only), EMI Studios, London (2.30pm-9.15pm)

- Stereo Mixing
  - "You Never Give Me Your Money" (remixes 20 – 27 from take 30)
- Production Staff: George Martin (Producer), Geoff Emerick/Phil McDonald (Engineer), Alan Parsons (2nd Engineer)

==== 14 August 1969 ====
Studio Two (control room only), EMI Studios, London (2.30pm-2.30am)

- Stereo Mixing
  - "Sun King/Mean Mr. Mustard" (remixes 20 – 24 from take 35)
  - "Maxwell's Silver Hammer" (edit piece remix 37 from take 27)
  - "Polythene Pam/She Came in Through the Bathroom Window (remixes 20 -32 from take 40) – remix 32 released on Abbey Road
- Editing
  - "Maxwell's Silver Hammer" (of stereo remixes 34 and 37)
  - Editing, crossfading and tape compilation Abbey Road Medley
- Production Staff: George Martin (Producer), Geoff Emerick/Phil McDonald (Engineer), Alan Parsons (2nd Engineer)

==== 15 August 1969 ====
Studio One into Studio Two (control room), EMI Studios, London (2.30pm-1.15am)

- Recording
  - "Golden Slumbers/Carry That Weight" (SI onto take 17)
    - take 17 / instrumental / strings & brass only – Released on Abbey Road 50th Anniversary Super Deluxe Edition
  - "The End" (SI onto take 7)
  - "Something" (SI onto take 39)
    - take 39 / instrumental / strings only – Released on Abbey Road 50th Anniversary Super Deluxe Edition
  - "Here Comes the Sun" (SI onto take 15)
- Production Staff: George Martin (Producer), Geoff Emerick/Phil McDonald (Engineer), Alan Parsons (2nd Engineer)

==== 18 August 1969 ====
Studio Two, EMI Studios, London (2.30pm-10.30pm)

- Stereo Mixing
  - "Golden Slumbers/Carry That Weight" (remixes 1 – 2 from take 17) – remix 2 released on Abbey Road
- Recording
  - "The End" (SI onto take 7)
- Stereo Mixing
  - "The End" (remixes 1 – 6 from take 7)
- Production Staff: George Martin (Producer), Geoff Emerick/Phil McDonald (Engineer), Alan Parsons (2nd Engineer)

==== 19 August 1969 ====
Studio Two, EMI Studios, London (2.00pm-4.00am)

- Stereo Mixing
  - "The End" (remixes 1 – 3 from take 7)
  - "Golden Slumbers/Carry That Weight" and "The End" (crossfade)
  - "Something" (remixes 1 – 10 from take 39) – remix 10 released on Abbey Road
- Recording
  - "Here Comes the Sun" (SI onto take 15)
- Stereo Mixing
  - "Here Comes the Sun" (remix 1 from take 15) – released on Abbey Road
- Production Staff: George Martin (Producer), Geoff Emerick/Phil McDonald (Engineer), Alan Parsons (2nd Engineer)

==== 20 August 1969 ====
Studio Three (control room only), EMI Studios, London (2.30pm-1.15am)

- Stereo Mixing
  - "I Want You (She's So Heavy)" (remixes 1 – 8 from take 1, remixes 9 and 10 from unnumbered master)
- Editing
  - "I Want You (She's So Heavy)" (of stereo remixes 8 and 10) – released on Abbey Road
- Master tape banding and tape copying
  - Abbey Road LP
- Production Staff: George Martin (Producer), Geoff Emerick/Phil McDonald (Engineer), Alan Parsons (2nd Engineer)

==== 21 August 1969 ====
Room 4 and Studio Two (control room only), EMI Studios, London (1.00pm-12.00pm)

- Editing
  - "The End" (take 7)
- Stereo Mixing
  - "You Never Give Me Your Money" into "Sun King/Mean Mr. Mustard" (stereo crossfade remix 12) – released on Abbey Road
  - "The End" (remix 4 from take 7)
- Production Staff: George Martin (Producer), Geoff Emerick/Phil McDonald (Engineer), Alan Parsons (2nd Engineer)

==== 25 August 1969 ====
Studio Two (control room only), EMI Studios, London (2.30pm-8.00pm)

- Editing
  - "Maxwell's Silver Hammer" (of master) – released on Abbey Road
  - "The End" (of master) – released on Abbey Road
- Recording
  - "Maxwell's Silver Hammer" (sound effects)
- Tape copying
  - "Abbey Road LP masters
- Production Staff: George Martin (Producer), Geoff Emerick/Phil McDonald (Engineer), Alan Parsons (2nd Engineer)

=== No One's Gonna Change Our World and Hey Jude sessions ===
==== 11 September 1969 ====
Studio Three (control room only), EMI Studios, London (2.30pm-5.30pm)

- Stereo mixing
  - "What's the New Mary Jane" (remixes 1–3, from take 4)
- Tape copying
  - "What's the New Mary Jane" (of stereo remixes 1–3)
- Personnel
  - Production staff: Malcolm Davies (producer), Tony Clark (engineer), Chris Blair (2nd engineer)

==== 2 October 1969 ====
Room 4, Abbey Road, London (9.30pm-11.00am)

- Stereo mixing
  - "Across the Universe" (remixes 1 and 2, from take 8) – remix 2 released on No One's Gonna Change Our World; included on Past Masters
- Personnel
  - Production staff: George Martin (producer), Jeff Jarratt (engineer), Alan Parsons (2nd engineer)

==== 26 November 1969 ====
Studio Two, EMI Studios, London (7.00pm-3.00am)

- Tape copying
  - "You Know My Name (Look Up the Number)" (of remix mono 3, called remix mono 4)
- Editing
  - "You Know My Name (Look Up the Number)" (of remix mono 4) – released as the B-side to "Let It Be"; included on Past Masters and Mono Masters
- Stereo mixing
  - "What's the New Mary Jane" (remix 4, from take 4)
- Stereo mixing with simultaneous overdub
  - "What's the New Mary Jane" (remix 5, from take 4)
- Editing
  - "What's the New Mary Jane" (of remix stereo 5, called remix stereo 6)
- Tape copying with simultaneous editing
  - "What's the New Mary Jane" (of stereo remixes 4 into 5)
- Tape copying
  - "What's the New Mary Jane" (of stereo remixes 4 and 5)
- Personnel
  - Production staff: Geoff Emerick and John Lennon (producer), Mike Sheady and Phil McDonald (engineer), Nick Webb (2nd engineer)

==== 2 December 1969 ====
Studio Two (control room only), EMI Studios, London (2.30pm-5.30pm)

- Stereo mixing
  - "Lady Madonna" (remix 1, from take 5) – released on Hey Jude; included on Past Masters
  - "Rain" (remix 1, from take 7) – released on Hey Jude; included on Past Masters
  - "Octopus's Garden" (Starkey) (remixes 1 and 2, from take 32) – for the TV program With a Little Help from My Friends
- Personnel
  - Production staff: George Martin (producer), Geoff Emerick and Phil McDonald (engineer), Richard Lush (2nd engineer)

==== 5 December 1969 ====
Room 4, Abbey Road, London (2.30pm-5.15pm)

- Stereo mixing
  - "Hey Jude" (remixes 20 and 21, from take 1) – remix 21 released on Hey Jude; included on Past Masters
  - "Revolution" (remix 1, from take 16) – released on Hey Jude; included on Past Masters
- Personnel
  - Production staff: George Martin (producer), Geoff Emerick and Phil McDonald (engineer), Neil Richmond (2nd engineer)

==== 8 December 1969 ====
Studio Two, EMI Studios, London (10.00am-12.15pm)

- Tape copying with simultaneous recording
  - "Octopus's Garden" (takes 1–10)
- Personnel
  - Production staff: George Martin (producer), Martin Benge (engineer), Richard Lush (2nd engineer)

=== Let It Be album sessions ===
Let It Be was put together from the Get Back sessions, documented above. Most songs do not have formal take numbers.

==== 5 February 1969 ====
Apple Studios, London (time unknown)

- Stereo Mixing
  - "I've Got a Feeling", "Don't Let Me Down", "Get Back", "The One After 909", "Dig a Pony"
- Production Staff: George Martin? (Producer), Glyn Johns (Engineer), Alan Parsons (2nd Engineer)

==== 10 March 1969 ====
Olympic Sound Studios, London (time unknown)

- Stereo Mixing
  - "Get Back", "Teddy Boy", "Two of Us", "Dig a Pony", "I've Got a Feeling", "The Long and Winding Road", "Let It Be", "Rocker", "Save the Last Dance for Me", "Don't Let Me Down", "For You Blue", "The Walk"
- Production Staff: George Martin? (Producer), Glyn Johns (Engineer), unknown (2nd Engineer)

==== 11 March 1969 ====
Olympic Sound Studios, London (time unknown)

- Stereo Mixing
  - "Two of Us", "The Long and Winding Road", "Lady Madonna"
- Production Staff: George Martin? (Producer), Glyn Johns (Engineer), unknown (2nd Engineer)

==== 12 March 1969 ====
Olympic Sound Studios, London (time unknown)

- Stereo Mixing
  - "The Long and Winding Road", "Let It Be"
- Production Staff: George Martin? (Producer), Glyn Johns (Engineer), unknown (2nd Engineer)

==== 13 March 1969 ====
Olympic Sound Studios, London (time unknown)

- Stereo Mixing
  - "I've Got a Feeling", "Dig It", "Maggie May", "Shake Rattle And Roll", "Kansas City", "Miss Ann", "Lawdy Miss Clawdy", "Blue Suede Shoes", "You Really Got a Hold on Me"
- Production Staff: George Martin? (Producer), Glyn Johns (Engineer), unknown (2nd Engineer)

==== 26 March 1969 ====
Studio unknown, Abbey Road Studio, London (time unknown)

- Mono Mixing
  - "Get Back" (remixes 1 – 4)
- Production Staff: George Martin? (Producer), Jeff Jarratt (Engineer), n/a (2nd Engineer)

==== 7 April 1969 ====
Olympic Sound Studios, London (time unknown)

- Mono Mixing
  - "Get Back" (remix 5) – released as a single on 11 April 1969; included on Mono Masters
  - "Don't Let Me Down" (remix 1) – released as the B-side to "Get Back"; included on Mono Masters
- Stereo Mixing
  - "Get Back" (remix 1) – included on Past Masters
  - "Don't Let Me Down" (remix 1) – included on Past Masters
- Production Staff: George Martin? (Producer), Glyn Johns (Engineer), Jerry Boys (2nd Engineer)

==== 25 April 1969 ====
Room 4, Abbey Road Studio, London (11.30am-12.30pm)

- Mono Mixing
  - "Two of Us" (remix 1)
- Production Staff: n/a (Producer), Peter Mew (Engineer), Chris Blair (2nd Engineer)

==== 30 April 1969 ====
Studio Three, Abbey Road Studios, London (7.15pm-2.00am)

- Recording
  - "Let It Be" (SI onto take 27)
  - "You Know My Name (Look Up the Number)" (SI onto take 30)
- Mono Mixing
  - "You Know My Name (Look Up the Number)" (remixes 1 – 3 from take 30)
- Production Staff: Chris Thomas (Producer), Jeff Jarratt (Engineer), Nick Webb (2nd Engineer)

==== 7 May 1969 ====
Studio One, Olympic Sound Studios, London (8.00pm-7.30am)

- Stereo Mixing
  - Inserts for Get Back LP (unreleased)
- Production Staff: George Martin (Producer), Glyn Johns (Engineer), Steve Vaughan (2nd Engineer)

==== 9 May 1969 ====
Studio One, Olympic Sound Studios, London (3.00pm-11.00pm)

- Stereo Mixing
  - Inserts for Get Back LP (unreleased)
- Production Staff: George Martin (Producer), Glyn Johns (Engineer), Steve Vaughan (2nd Engineer)

==== 28 May 1969 ====
Studio One, Olympic Sound Studios, London (time unknown)

- Stereo Mixing
  - "Let It Be" (of take 27)
  - Master tape banding and compilation for Get Back LP (unreleased)
- Production Staff: George Martin (Producer), Glyn Johns (Engineer), Steve Vaughan (2nd Engineer)

==== 11 August 1969 ====
Studio Three (control room only), Abbey Road Studios, London (1.00pm-2.00pm)

- Mono tape copying
  - "Dig It" (of 13 March stereo mix)
- Production Staff: n/a (Producer), Phil McDonald (Engineer and 2nd Engineer)

== 1970 ==
=== Let It Be album sessions (cont.) ===
==== 3 January 1970 ====
Studio Two, Abbey Road Studios, London (2.30pm-12.15am)

- Recording
  - "I Me Mine" (takes 1 – 16)
    - Wake Up Little Susie/Take 11 – released on Let It Be Super Deluxe
    - Take 16 – released on Anthology 3
- Production Staff: George Martin (Producer), Phil McDonald (Engineer), Richard Langham (2nd Engineer)

==== 4 January 1970 ====
Studio Two, Abbey Road Studios, London (2.30pm-4.00am)

- Recording
  - "Let It Be" (SI onto take 27, tape reduction take 27 into takes 28 – 30 with simultaneous SI, SI onto take 30)
- Stereo Mixing
  - "Let It Be" (remixes 1 and 2 from take 30) – remix 2 released as a single; included on Past Masters
- Production Staff: George Martin (Producer), Phil McDonald (Engineer), Richard Langham (2nd Engineer)

==== 5 January 1970 ====
Studio One, Olympic Sound Studios, London (time unknown)

- Stereo Mixing
  - "I Me Mine" (remix 1 from take 16)
  - "Across the Universe" (remix 3 from take 8)
- Master tape banding and compilation
  - Get Back LP (unreleased)
- Production Staff: Glyn Johns (Producer, Engineer and 2nd Engineer)

==== 27 January 1970 ====
Studio Two (control room only), Abbey Road Studios, London (10.00pm-11.30pm)

- Stereo Mixing
  - "The Inner Light" (remix 1 from take 6) – released on Past Masters
  - Production Staff: Geoff Emerick (Producer), Peter Brown/Jeff Jarratt (Engineer), John Barrett (2nd Engineer)

==== 28 February 1970 ====
Room 4, Abbey Road Studios, London (time unknown)

- Stereo Mixing
  - "For You Blue" (remixes 1 – 8)
- Production Staff: Malcolm Davies (Producer), Peter Brown (Engineer), Richard Langham (2nd Engineer)

==== 23 March 1970 ====
Room 4, Abbey Road Studios, London (time unknown)

- Stereo Mixing
  - "I've Got a Feeling" (remixes 1 and 2)
  - "Dig a Pony" (remixes 1 and 2) – remix 2 released on Let It Be
  - "I've Got a Feeling" (remixes 3 – 6)
  - "The One After 909" (remixes 1 – 3) – remix 3 released on Let It Be
  - "I Me Mine" (remixes 1 – 3 from take 16)
  - "Across the Universe" (remixes 1 – 8 from take 8)
- Editing
  - "I've Got a Feeling" (of remixes 1 and 2 called stereo remix 3, of remixes 3 – 6 called stereo remix 4) – stereo remix 4 released on Let It Be
  - "I Me Mine" (of remixes 1 – 3 called stereo remix 2)
- Production Staff: Phil Spector (Producer), Peter Brown (Engineer), Roger Ferris (2nd Engineer)

==== 25 March 1970 ====
Room 4, Abbey Road Studios, London (time unknown)

- Stereo Mixing
  - "For You Blue" (remix 1, remixes 2 – 8 of edit piece only)
  - "Teddy Boy" (remixes 1 and 2)
  - "Two of Us" (remixes 1 and 2) – remix 2 released on Let It Be
- Editing
  - "For You Blue" (of remixes 1 and 5 called stereo remix 1) – released on Let It Be
  - "Teddy Boy" (of stereo remix 2)
- Production Staff: Phil Spector (Producer), Peter Brown (Engineer), Roger Ferris (2nd Engineer)

==== 26 March 1970 ====
Room 4, Abbey Road Studios, London (time unknown)

- Stereo Mixing
  - "The Long and Winding Road" (remix 1)
  - "Let It Be" (remixes 1 – 4 from take 30)
  - "Get Back" (remixes 1 – 5)
  - "Maggie May" (remixes 1 and 2) – remix 2 released on Let It Be
- Editing
  - "Let It Be" (of remixes 1 – 4 called stereo remix 1) – released on Let It Be
  - "Get Back" (of remixes 3 and 5 called stereo remix 3) – released on Let It Be
- Production Staff: Phil Spector (Producer), Peter Brown (Engineer), Roger Ferris (2nd Engineer)

==== 27 March 1970 ====
Room 4, Abbey Road Studios, London (time unknown)

- Stereo Mixing
  - "Dig It" (remix 1) – released on Let It Be
  - Dialogue and miscellaneous pieces for LP
- Production Staff: Phil Spector (Producer), Mike Sheady (Engineer), Roger Ferris (2nd Engineer)

==== 30 March 1970 ====
Room 4, Abbey Road Studios, London (time unknown)

- Stereo Mixing
  - "For You Blue" (unnumbered stereo remixes)
- Production Staff: Phil Spector (Producer), Mike Sheady/Eddie Klein (Engineer), Roger Ferris (2nd Engineer)

==== 1 April 1970 ====
Studio One and control room Studio Three, Abbey Road Studios, London (7.00pm-time unknown)

- Recording
  - "Across the Universe" (tape reduction take 8 into take 9, SI onto take 9)
  - "The Long and Winding Road" (tape reduction of 31 January 1969 recording into takes 17 – 19, SI onto take 18)
  - "I Me Mine" (tape reduction extended edit of take 16 into takes 17 and 18, SI onto take 18)
- Production Staff: Phil Spector (Producer), Peter Brown (Engineer), Richard Lush (2nd Engineer)

==== 2 April 1970 ====
Room 4, Abbey Road Studios, London (time unknown)

- Stereo Mixing
  - "The Long and Winding Road" (remixes 10 -13 from take 18)
  - "I Me Mine" (remixes 10 – 12 from take 18)
  - "Across the Universe" (remixes 10 – 13 from take 9) – remix 13 released on Let It Be
- Editing
  - "The Long and Winding Road" (of stereo remixes 10 and 13) – released on Let It Be
  - "I Me Mine" (of stereo remixes 11 and 12) – released on Let It Be
- Production Staff: Phil Spector (Producer), Peter Brown (Engineer), Roger Ferris (2nd Engineer)

==== 8 May 1970 ====
"Let It Be" LP release

- Two of Us, mixed 25 March 1970, recorded 31 January 1969 take 11 (DDSI 31.13)
- Dig a Pony, mixed 23 March 1970, recorded 30 January 1969 at the rooftop concert (DDSI 30.11)
- Across the Universe, mixed 2 April 1970, recorded 4 and 8 February 1968 take 8
- I Me Mine, mixed 2 April 1970, recorded 3 January 1970 take 16
- Dig It, mixed 27 March 1970, recorded 26 January 1969 (DDSI 26.55). ("Dig It" was an eleven-minute, twenty-five second jam that had a fifty-second excerpt included in the Let It Be album, due to the fact that a section of it was included in the film by the same name).
- Let It Be, mixed 26 March 1970, recorded 31 January 1969 take 27 (DDSI 31.64)
- Maggie Mae, mixed 26 March 1970, recorded 24 January 1969 (DDSI 24.49). (Maggie Mae was a traditional Liverpool folk tune that the Beatles played in the early 1960s).
- I've Got a Feeling, mixed 23 March 1970, recorded 30 January 1969 at the Rooftop Concert (DDSI 30.06)
- One After 909, mixed 23 March 1970, recorded 30 January 1969 at the Rooftop Concert (DDSI 30.08). ("One After 909" was an early Lennon–McCartney composition that was originally recorded in 1963 and was re-recorded for the Let It Be album.)
- The Long and Winding Road, mixed 2 April 1970, recorded 26 January 1969 (DDSI 26.91)
- For You Blue, mixed 25 March 1970, recorded 25 January 1969 take 6 (DDSI 25.47)
- Get Back, mixed 26 March 1970, recorded 27 January 1969 (DDSI 27.63). (Segment of speech by McCartney and Lennon was included after the song appearing on the album).

== See also ==
- The Beatles bootleg recordings
- List of songs recorded by the Beatles
- Sessions
- Unreleased Lennon–McCartney songs

== Bibliography ==
- "The Beatles Bible". Cardiff.
- Lewisohn, Mark (2010) [First published 1992]. The Complete Beatles Chronicle. Chicago: Chicago Review Press. ISBN 978-1-56976-534-0.
- Lewisohn, Mark (2004) [First published 1988]. The Complete Beatles Recording Sessions: The Official Story of the Abbey Road Years 1962–1970. London: Hamlyn. ISBN 0-681-03189-1.
- Sulpy, Doug; Schweighhardt, Ray (2007). Drugs, Divorce and a Slipping Image: The Complete, Unauthorized Story of the Beatles Get Back Sessions. The 910 Publishing. ISBN 978-0-9643869-8-3.
