= Rarities (Beatles compilations) =

Compilation albums by the Beatles

Rarities is the name of two separate and unrelated compilation albums by the English rock band the Beatles. The first was released in the United Kingdom in December 1978, while the second album was issued in the United States in March 1980.

== 1978 UK album ==
Rarities
- UK cover

Compilation album by the Beatles
- Released: 2 December 1978
- Recorded: 1963–1969, EMI Studios, London; Pathé Marconi Studios, Paris; His Master's Voice studios, Bombay
- Genre: Rock
- Length: 43:29
- Label: Parlophone
- Producer: George Martin

The Beatles British chronology
| The Beatles Collection (1978) | Rarities (1978) | The Beatles Ballads (1980) |

Professional ratings
Review scores
| Source | Rating |
|---|---|
| AllMusic | 3/5 stars |
| The Encyclopedia of Popular Music | 3/5 stars |

Rarities is a British compilation album featuring a selection of songs by the Beatles. The album was originally released as part of The Beatles Collection, a boxed set featuring the 12 original Beatles studio albums, but was later issued individually. The album has never been issued on CD, but all of the tracks are available on the double CD compilation album Past Masters.

Rarities was conceived to include lesser-known songs that were not included on any other original Beatles album. These included B-sides of singles, two German-language recordings, the tracks from an EP with exclusive material, a song recorded for the American market and a version of "Across the Universe" that had previously appeared on a World Wildlife Fund charity record.

The selections chosen are tracks which have not appeared on any of the original British Beatles albums (that is, the albums included in The Beatles Collection). The career-spanning compilations 1962–1966 and 1967–1970, and the Magical Mystery Tour LP (which was originally only released in the US), would all be necessary for the collector wishing to acquire every song in the entire Beatles official catalogue; however, still missing would be the original single version of "Love Me Do". This track, which went out of print in late 1963, was not available anywhere until its inclusion on the 1980 Capitol Records compilation album Rarities. In 1982, the original recording of "Love Me Do" was finally reissued in Britain on a 12" single.

Rarities was released on 2 November 1978 in the United Kingdom, as part of The Beatles Collection boxed set. Due to popular demand, the Rarities album was issued separately on 12 October 1979, in the UK.

=== Track listing ===
All songs written by Lennon–McCartney except where indicated. All songs are in mono unless indicated as stereo.

Side one

1. "Across the Universe" ("Wildlife" version from a British various artists charity album titled No One's Gonna Change Our World) stereo
2. "Yes It Is" (B-side)
3. "This Boy" (B-side)
4. "The Inner Light" (George Harrison) (B-side)
5. "I'll Get You" (B-side)
6. "Thank You Girl" (B-side)
7. "Komm, Gib Mir Deine Hand" (German version of "I Want to Hold Your Hand") stereo
8. "You Know My Name (Look Up the Number)" (B-side)
9. "Sie Liebt Dich" (German version of "She Loves You") stereo

The unique US pressing of Rarities included in the American limited-edition numbered boxed set of The Beatles Collection contained "I Want to Hold Your Hand" rather than "Komm Gib Mir Deine Hand", and "She Loves You" rather than "Sie Liebt Dich".

Side two

10. "Rain" (B-side)
11. "She's a Woman" (B-side)
12. "Matchbox" (Perkins) (From Long Tall Sally EP)
13. "I Call Your Name" (From Long Tall Sally EP)
14. "Bad Boy" (Williams) (recorded for the American LP Beatles VI, first UK release on A Collection of Beatles Oldies) stereo
15. "Slow Down" (Williams) (From Long Tall Sally EP)
16. "I'm Down" (B-side)
17. "Long Tall Sally" (Johnson/Penniman/Blackwell) (From "Long Tall Sally" EP)

=== Charts and certifications ===
==== Charts ====
| Chart (1979) | Peak position |
|---|---|
| UK Albums (Official Charts) | 71 |

==== Certifications ====
| Region | Certification | Certified units/sales |
|---|---|---|
| United Kingdom (BPI) | Silver | 60,000^{^} |
^{^} Shipments figures based on certification alone.

== 1980 US album ==
Rarities
- US cover

Compilation album by the Beatles
- Released: 24 March 1980
- Recorded: 1962–1969 at EMI Studios, London, Pathé Marconi Studio, Paris; His Master's Voice studios, Bombay
- Genres: Rock; psychedelia
- Length: 41:04
- Label: Capitol
- Producer: George Martin

The Beatles American chronology
| The Beatles Collection (1978) | Rarities (1980) | Reel Music (1982) |

Professional ratings
Review scores
| Source | Rating |
|---|---|
| AllMusic | 2/5 stars |
| Christgau's Record Guide | C+ |
| The Rolling Stone Record Guide | 3/5 stars |

Rarities is a compilation album released by Capitol Records in North America, featuring a selection of songs by the Beatles. The album was inspired by an earlier compilation of the same name which was released as part of The Beatles Collection box set. Most of the tracks on the Beatles Collection disc titled Rarities were already available on American Beatles LPs. As a result, Capitol assembled an album of Beatles tracks that were considered rare in America. They include tracks not previously issued on a Capitol or Apple LP and alternative versions of several well-known songs which were also not readily available in America. A highlight of the album was the gatefold sleeve featuring the controversial "butcher" photo from the 1966 Yesterday and Today album.

Although the Capitol Rarities album was geared towards the American market, it was also issued in several other countries, including Australia, Canada, France, Japan and New Zealand. The Rarities album has not been released on compact disc. All but three of the tracks were subsequently made available on other Beatles CDs, such as the Beatles' 2009 mono and stereo box sets.

After the album was released in 1980, Paul McCartney stated that it was "quite good".

=== Track listing ===
All songs written by Lennon–McCartney except where noted.

Side one

1. "Love Me Do" – 2:22
  - Mono, original UK single on Parlophone 45-R4949 with Ringo Starr on drums; now available on Past Masters
2. "Misery" – 1:46
  - Stereo, previously issued on Vee-Jay LP Introducing... The Beatles; available on Please Please Me
3. "There's a Place" – 1:47
  - Stereo, previously issued on Vee Jay LP Introducing... The Beatles; available on Please Please Me
4. "Sie Liebt Dich" – 2:16
  - Stereo, previously released only as a mono single in the US on Swan Records; now available on Past Masters
5. "And I Love Her" – 2:36
  - Stereo, alternate version with six-bar ending; originally issued in Germany; available on The Beatles Box, not available on CD
6. "Help!" – 2:16
  - Mono, with different vocals than the stereo LP; available on The Beatles in Mono
7. "I'm Only Sleeping" – 2:59
  - Stereo, final UK Revolver mix (early mono and alternate stereo mixes were released in the US)
8. "I Am the Walrus" – 4:32
  - Stereo, new edit compiled from US single and UK album releases: six note intro and extra beats before the "Yellow matter custard" verse; available on The Beatles Box, not available on CD

Side two

1. "Penny Lane" – 3:00
  - Stereo, new version compiled from the German true stereo version with the US promotional mono version's extra piccolo trumpet solo added onto the ending; not available on CD. available on The Beatles Box
2. "Helter Skelter" – 3:38
  - Mono, ends at first fadeout without Ringo Starr's "blisters" outburst (first pressings erroneously attribute the statement to John Lennon in the album's liner notes); available on The Beatles in Mono
3. "Don't Pass Me By" (Starkey) – 3:45
  - Mono, sped-up version with different violin in places; available on The Beatles in Mono
4. "The Inner Light" (Harrison) – 2:32
  - Mono, previously released as the B-side of "Lady Madonna"; now available on Mono Masters
5. "Across the Universe" – 3:44
  - Stereo, original version from No One's Gonna Change Our World, a British compilation album made for the World Wildlife Fund; now available on Past Masters
6. "You Know My Name (Look Up the Number)" – 4:17
  - Mono, previously released as the B-side of "Let It Be"; now available on Past Masters
7. "Sgt. Pepper Inner Groove" – 0:02
  - Stereo, a piece that ended the original British release of Sgt. Pepper's Lonely Hearts Club Band but was not included on the American version of the album. It consists of a few seconds of 15 kilohertz tone (similar to a dog whistle) followed by two seconds of laughter and noise on the runout groove. The tone is not included on this album but the laughter and noise are featured just before the actual runout groove. It has since been restored, including the high-pitch tone, for all worldwide CD and cassette versions of Sgt. Pepper as well as the 2012 vinyl remaster of the LP. The track is only the snippet on the Rarities album, not repeated (mimicking an album "stuck" on the inner groove) as on the Sgt. Pepper album.

=== Charts and certifications ===
==== Charts ====
| Chart (1980) | Peak position |
|---|---|
| Australian (Kent Music Report) | 27 |
| Canada Top Albums/CDs (RPM) | 26 |
| New Zealand Albums (RMNZ) | 43 |
| US Billboard 200 | 21 |

==== Certifications ====
| Region | Certification | Certified units/sales |
|---|---|---|
| Canada (Music Canada) | Gold | 50,000^{^} |
| United States (RIAA) | Gold | 500,000^{^} |
^{^} Shipments figures based on certification alone.
