= Mono Masters =

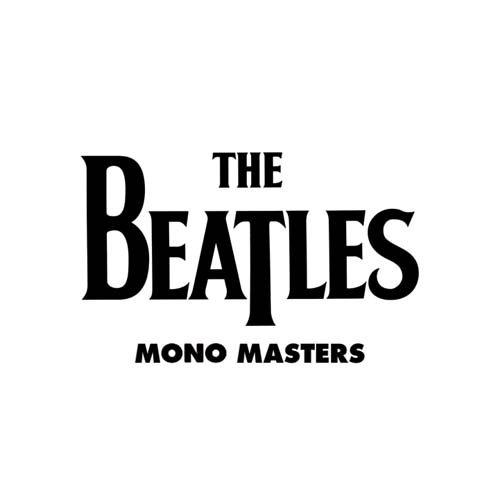

Compilation album by The Beatles
- Released: 9 September 2009 (as part of The Beatles in Mono box set); 9 September 2014 (individual release)
- Recorded: 1962–1969
- Genre: Rock
- Length: 99:02
- Languages: English, German ("Komm, Gib Mir Deine Hand" and "Sie Liebt Dich")
- Labels: Parlophone, Capitol, Apple
- Producer: George Martin

The Beatles chronology
The Beatles in Mono (2009)	Mono Masters (2009)	Tomorrow Never Knows (2012)

Mono Masters is a compilation album by the Beatles, and is an alternate, all-mono version of the album Past Masters. Mono Masters was originally a two-CD set included as part of The Beatles in Mono box set. The premise of this box set was to compile only Beatles material which was released or prepared for release with a dedicated mono mix (the set excludes later material mixed and released only in stereo, and stereo-only material whose mono version was simply created as an equal mix of the two channels of the stereo version, e.g. 1969's Yellow Submarine album). As a result, the track listing for Mono Masters differs from Past Masters on the second half of disc two, replacing some later songs that never had a mono mix ("The Ballad of John and Yoko", "Old Brown Shoe" and "Let It Be") with several songs released on stereo-only albums that had unreleased mono mixes. Tracks 9–12 and 15 of disc two were prepared in March 1969 for release as a 7" mono Yellow Submarine EP, two months after the release of the similarly titled soundtrack album, but the project was scrapped, although the EP was mastered. Instead, the tracks were only released in stereo (and in an electronically produced mono mixdown, or "fold-down", of the stereo mix), while the true mono mixes remained unreleased. "Get Back" (with B-side "Don't Let Me Down") was the final Beatles single mixed for mono format. It was released in the UK in mono, though the US release was in stereo. Thus, the songs that were originally released on stereo singles worldwide are omitted on this release.

This compilation was released individually as a triple vinyl LP set on 9 September 2014 in Europe and the following day in North America on the same day that The Beatles in Mono box set was released in vinyl LP format. The vinyl format compilation is mastered directly from the original analogue mono master tapes.

Kevin Howlett’s notes for the 2018 White Album box set correct the dating given in the 2009 Mono Masters, identifying the “Across the Universe” mono mix as the original February 1968 mono mix, rather than a unique mix created in January 1969.

== Mono Masters track listing ==
All songs written and composed by Lennon-McCartney, except where noted.

Disc one

No.	Title	Lead vocals	Length
1.	"Love Me Do" (from the 5 October 1962 A-side, the original single version on Parlophone, catalogue number 45-R4949; recorded on 4 September 1962, featuring Ringo Starr on drums)	Paul McCartney with John Lennon	2:25
2.	"From Me to You" (from the 11 April 1963 A-side)	Lennon and McCartney	1:57
3.	"Thank You Girl" (from the 11 April 1963 B-side)	Lennon and McCartney	2:04
4.	"She Loves You" (from the 23 August 1963 A-side)	Lennon and McCartney	2:21
5.	"I'll Get You" (from the 23 August 1963 B-side)	Lennon with McCartney	2:06
6.	"I Want to Hold Your Hand" (from the 29 November 1963 A-side)	Lennon and McCartney	2:26
7.	"This Boy" (from the 29 November 1963 B-side)	Lennon with George Harrison and McCartney	2:16
8.	"Komm, Gib Mir Deine Hand" (Lennon, McCartney, Jean Nicolas, Heinz Hellmer) (from the March 1964 German single)	Lennon and McCartney	2:26
9.	"Sie Liebt Dich" (Lennon, McCartney, Nicolas, Lee Montague) (from the March 1964 German single)	Lennon and McCartney	2:19
10.	"Long Tall Sally" (Enotris Johnson, Robert Blackwell, Richard Penniman) (from the 19 June 1964 Long Tall Sally EP)	McCartney	2:03
11.	"I Call Your Name" (from the Long Tall Sally EP)	Lennon	2:11
12.	"Slow Down" (Larry Williams) (from the Long Tall Sally EP)	Lennon	2:57
13.	"Matchbox" (Carl Perkins) (from the Long Tall Sally EP)	Ringo Starr	1:59
14.	"I Feel Fine" (from the 27 November 1964 A-side)	Lennon	2:23
15.	"She's a Woman" (from the 27 November 1964 B-side)	McCartney	3:04
16.	"Bad Boy" (Williams) (from the 14 June 1965 US album Beatles VI and the 10 December 1966 UK album A Collection of Beatles Oldies)	Lennon	2:20
17.	"Yes It Is" (from the 9 April 1965 B-side of "Ticket to Ride")	Lennon, McCartney and Harrison	2:42
18.	"I'm Down" (from the 23 July 1965 B-side of "Help!")	McCartney	2:38
Total length:			42:37

Disc two

No.	Title	Lead vocals	Length
1.	"Day Tripper" (from the 3 December 1965 double A-side)	Lennon and McCartney	2:52
2.	"We Can Work It Out" (from the 3 December 1965 A-side)	McCartney with Lennon	2:15
3.	"Paperback Writer" (from the 10 June 1966 A-side)	McCartney	2:26
4.	"Rain" (from the 10 June 1966 B-side)	Lennon	3:01
5.	"Lady Madonna" (from the 15 March 1968 A-side)	McCartney	2:17
6.	"The Inner Light" (George Harrison) (from the 15 March 1968 B-side)	Harrison	2:36
7.	"Hey Jude" (from the 30 August 1968 A-side)	McCartney	7:09
8.	"Revolution" (from the 30 August 1968 single version B-side)	Lennon	3:25
9.	"Only a Northern Song" (Harrison) (Previously unreleased April 1967 mono mix)	Harrison	3:26
10.	"All Together Now" (Previously unreleased May 1967 mono mix)	McCartney	2:11
11.	"Hey Bulldog" (Previously unreleased February 1968 mono mix)	Lennon with McCartney	3:14
12.	"It's All Too Much" (Harrison) (Previously unreleased October 1968 mono mix)	Harrison	6:28
13.	"Get Back" (from the 11 April 1969 single version A-side)	McCartney	3:11
14.	"Don't Let Me Down" (from the 11 April 1969 B-side)	Lennon with McCartney	3:33
15.	"Across the Universe" (Previously unreleased February 1968 mono mix of the "Wildlife" version)	Lennon	3:50
16.	"You Know My Name (Look Up the Number)" (from the 6 March 1970 B-side of "Let It Be")	Lennon and McCartney	4:24
Total length:			56:25

== Mono Masters vinyl LP track listing ==
All songs written and composed by Lennon-McCartney, except where noted.

Side one

No.	Title	Lead vocals	Length
1.	"Love Me Do" (from the 5 October 1962 A-side, the original single version on Parlophone, catalogue number 45-R4949; recorded on 4 September 1962, featuring Ringo Starr on drums)	McCartney with Lennon	2:25
2.	"From Me to You" (from the 11 April 1963 A-side)	Lennon and McCartney	1:57
3.	"Thank You Girl" (from the 11 April 1963 B-side)	Lennon and McCartney	2:04
4.	"She Loves You" (from the 23 August 1963 A-side)	Lennon and McCartney	2:21
5.	"I'll Get You" (from the 23 August 1963 B-side)	Lennon with McCartney	2:06
6.	"I Want to Hold Your Hand" (from the 29 November 1963 A-side)	Lennon and McCartney	2:26
7.	"This Boy" (from the 29 November 1963 B-side)	Lennon with Harrison and McCartney	2:16
Total length:			15:35

Side two

No.	Title	Lead vocals	Length
1.	"Komm, Gib Mir Deine Hand" (Lennon, McCartney, Nicolas, Hellmer) (from the March 1964 German single)	Lennon and McCartney	2:26
2.	"Sie Liebt Dich" (Lennon, McCartney, Nicolas, Montague) (from the March 1964 German single)	Lennon and McCartney	2:19
3.	"Long Tall Sally" (Johnson, Blackwell, Penniman) (from the 19 June 1964 Long Tall Sally EP)	McCartney	2:03
4.	"I Call Your Name" (from the Long Tall Sally EP)	Lennon	2:11
5.	"Slow Down" (Williams) (from the Long Tall Sally EP)	Lennon	2:57
6.	"Matchbox" (Perkins) (from the Long Tall Sally EP)	Starr	1:59
7.	"I Feel Fine" (from the 27 November 1964 A-side)	Lennon	2:23
8.	"She's a Woman" (from the 27 November 1964 B-side)	McCartney	3:04
Total length:			19:22

Side three

No.	Title	Lead vocals	Length
1.	"Bad Boy" (Williams) (from the 14 June 1965 US album Beatles VI and the 10 December 1966 UK album A Collection of Beatles Oldies)	Lennon	2:20
2.	"Yes It Is" (from the 9 April 1965 B-side of "Ticket to Ride")	Lennon, McCartney and Harrison	2:42
3.	"I'm Down" (from the 23 July 1965 B-side of "Help!")	McCartney	2:38
4.	"Day Tripper" (from the 3 December 1965 double A-side)	Lennon and McCartney	2:52
5.	"We Can Work It Out" (from the 3 December 1965 A-side)	McCartney with Lennon	2:15
6.	"Paperback Writer" (from the 10 June 1966 A-side)	McCartney	2:26
7.	"Rain" (from the 10 June 1966 B-side)	Lennon	3:01
Total length:			18:14

Side four

No.	Title	Lead vocals	Length
1.	"Lady Madonna" (from the 15 March 1968 A-side)	McCartney	2:17
2.	"The Inner Light" (Harrison) (from the 15 March 1968 B-side)	Harrison	2:36
3.	"Hey Jude" (from the 30 August 1968 A-side)	McCartney	7:09
4.	"Revolution" (from the 30 August 1968 single version B-side)	Lennon	3:25
Total length:			15:27

Side five

No.	Title	Lead vocals	Length
1.	"Only a Northern Song" (Harrison) (Previously unreleased April 1967 mono mix)	Harrison	3:26
2.	"All Together Now" (Previously unreleased May 1967 mono mix)	McCartney	2:11
3.	"Hey Bulldog" (Previously unreleased February 1968 mono mix)	Lennon with McCartney	3:14
4.	"It's All Too Much" (Harrison) (Previously unreleased October 1968 mono mix)	Harrison	6:28
Total length:			15:19

Side six

No.	Title	Lead vocals	Length
1.	"Get Back" (from the 11 April 1969 single version A-side)	McCartney	3:11
2.	"Don't Let Me Down" (from the 11 April 1969 B-side)	Lennon with McCartney	3:33
3.	"Across the Universe" (Previously unreleased February 1968 mono mix of the "Wildlife" version)	Lennon	3:50
4.	"You Know My Name (Look Up the Number)" (from the 6 March 1970 B-side of "Let It Be")	Lennon and McCartney	4:24
Total length:			14:58
