= Past Masters =

1988 compilation album by The Beatles

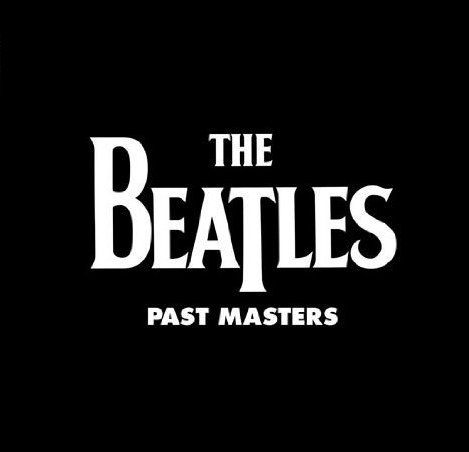
- The 2009 Past Masters album cover

Compilation album by the Beatles
- Released: 7 March 1988
- Recorded: 4 September 1962 – 4 January 1970
- Studios: EMI, Trident, Olympic and Apple, London: Pathé Marconi, Paris
- Genre: Rock
- Length: 93:29
- Languages: English, German ("Komm, Gib Mir Deine Hand" / "Sie Liebt Dich")
- Labels: Parlophone, Capitol, Apple
- Producer: George Martin
- Compiler: Mark Lewisohn

The Beatles chronology
20 Greatest Hits (1982)	Past Masters (1988)	The Beatles Box Set (1988)

Professional ratings
Review scores
Source	Rating
AllMusic	(Vol. 1) (Vol. 2) (Vol. 1 & 2)
BBC	(favourable)
Consequence	3.5/5 stars
The Daily Telegraph	3/5 stars
The Encyclopedia of Popular Music	5/5 stars
One Thirty BPM	100%
Pitchfork	9.2/10

Past Masters is a two-disc compilation album set by the English rock band the Beatles. It was originally released as two separate volumes on 7 March 1988, as part of the first issue of the band's catalogue on compact disc. The album contains all songs released commercially by the band that were not available on the Beatles' 12 original UK albums or the US Magical Mystery Tour LP. It was compiled by Beatles historian Mark Lewisohn, who also wrote the liner notes. The majority of the Past Masters set consists of A- and B-sides from the band's singles, including single versions of songs that appeared in a different form on the band's albums. Also included are the full contents of the UK-only Long Tall Sally EP, two German-language tracks, a song recorded for the American market, and a track released on a charity compilation album.

Although Past Masters is not a studio album and is instead a compilation, it is considered to be the Beatles' 14th (and final) major release. This occurred when the Beatles' core catalogue was standardized in 1987, followed by the official re-releases in 2009.

== Release history ==
Past Masters was originally issued as two separate CDs, Past Masters, Volume One and Past Masters, Volume Two, on 7 March 1988. The two volumes were included in The Beatles Box Set. A double LP set, titled Past Masters, Volumes One & Two (also titled simply Past Masters), was subsequently released in the US on 24 October 1988 and in the UK on 10 November 1988. Both volumes were also released as a double cassette bundle on 7 March 1988.

The double set was re-released on CD, titled simply Past Masters, on 9 September 2009, as part of the remastering of the original Beatles catalogue, and was included in The Beatles (The Original Studio Recordings) box set. This release includes stereo mixes of both "From Me to You" and "Thank You Girl", whereas the original 1988 issue contained the two tracks in mono. Mark Lewisohn's name was removed from this reissue. The Beatles in Mono box set, released at the same time, includes the album Mono Masters, which contains a similar track list of dedicated mono mixes.

A remastered-for-vinyl version of the Past Masters double LP set was released on 12 November 2012.

== Track listings ==
The dates provided are the dates when the tracks were originally released, not recorded.

All songs written and composed by Lennon–McCartney, except where noted. Tracks are in stereo, except where noted.

=== Past Masters, Volume One ===
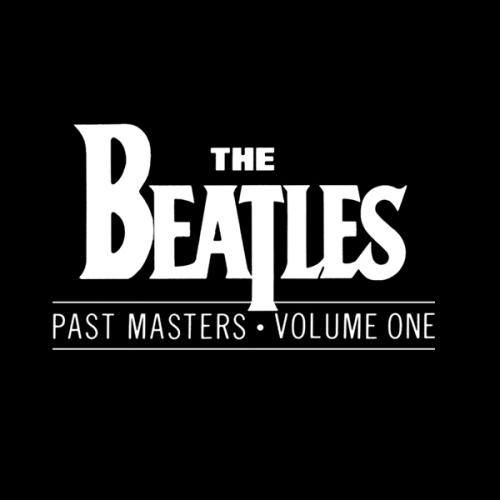
Past Masters, Volume One album cover

Contains recordings originally released between 1962 and 1965:

- Eleven tracks from British singles (including B-sides)
- Both tracks from the German single "Komm, Gib Mir Deine Hand" / "Sie Liebt Dich"
- All four tracks from the Long Tall Sally EP
- The US-only track "Bad Boy", from the album Beatles VI (although the song was also on the 1966 A Collection of Beatles Oldies album released by Parlophone)

No.	Title	Lead vocals	Length
1.	"Love Me Do" (from 5 October 1962 A-side, the original single version on Parlophone, catalogue number 45-R4949; recorded on 4 September 1962, featuring Ringo Starr on drums; mono)	Paul McCartney with John Lennon	2:24
2.	"From Me to You" (from 11 April 1963 A-side; mono)	Lennon and McCartney	1:58
3.	"Thank You Girl" (from 11 April 1963 B-side; mono)	Lennon and McCartney	2:04
4.	"She Loves You" (from 23 August 1963 A-side; mono)	Lennon and McCartney	2:21
5.	"I'll Get You" (from 23 August 1963 B-side; mono)	Lennon and McCartney	2:06
6.	"I Want to Hold Your Hand" (from 29 November 1963 A-side)	Lennon and McCartney	2:27
7.	"This Boy" (from 29 November 1963 B-side)	Lennon, with McCartney and Harrison	2:16
8.	"Komm, gib mir deine Hand" (Lennon/McCartney/Jean Nicolas/Heinz Hellmer) (from March 1964 German single; very narrow stereo, wider stereo on 2009 remasters)	Lennon and McCartney	2:27
9.	"Sie liebt dich" (Lennon/McCartney/Nicolas/Lee Montague) (from March 1964 German single; very narrow stereo, wider stereo on 2009 remasters)	Lennon and McCartney	2:20
10.	"Long Tall Sally" (Enotris Johnson, Robert Blackwell, Richard Penniman) (from 19 June 1964 Long Tall Sally EP)	McCartney	2:03
11.	"I Call Your Name" (from Long Tall Sally EP)	Lennon	2:09
12.	"Slow Down" (Larry Williams) (from Long Tall Sally EP)	Lennon	2:56
13.	"Matchbox" (Carl Perkins) (from Long Tall Sally EP)	Ringo Starr	1:59
14.	"I Feel Fine" (from 27 November 1964 A-side)	Lennon	2:20
15.	"She's a Woman" (from 27 November 1964 B-side)	McCartney	3:03
16.	"Bad Boy" (Williams) (from 14 June 1965 US album Beatles VI, 10 December 1966 UK album A Collection of Beatles Oldies)	Lennon	2:21
17.	"Yes It Is" (from 9 April 1965 B-side of "Ticket to Ride")	Lennon, with McCartney and Harrison	2:43
18.	"I'm Down" (from 23 July 1965 B-side of "Help!")	McCartney	2:32
Total length:			42:28

=== Past Masters, Volume Two ===
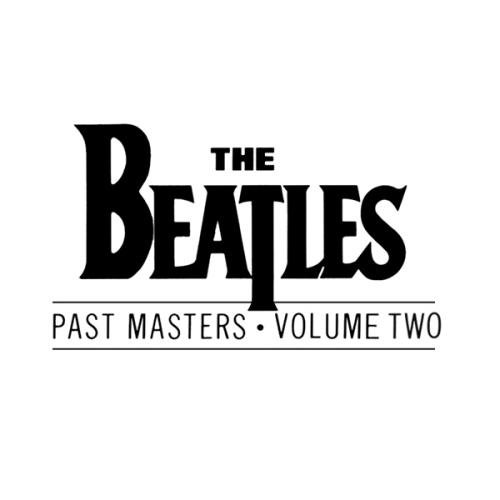
Past Masters, Volume Two album cover

Contains recordings originally released between 1965 and 1970:

- Fourteen tracks from British singles (including B-sides)
- The "Wildlife" version of "Across the Universe" from the charity album No One's Gonna Change Our World

No.	Title	Lead vocals	Length
1.	"Day Tripper" (from 3 December 1965 double A-side)	McCartney and Lennon	2:50
2.	"We Can Work It Out" (from 3 December 1965 double A-side)	McCartney with Lennon	2:16
3.	"Paperback Writer" (from 10 June 1966 A-side)	McCartney	2:19
4.	"Rain" (from 10 June 1966 B-side)	Lennon	3:02
5.	"Lady Madonna" (from 15 March 1968 A-side)	McCartney	2:18
6.	"The Inner Light" (George Harrison) (15 March 1968 B-side)	George Harrison	2:37
7.	"Hey Jude" (from 30 August 1968 A-side)	McCartney	7:08
8.	"Revolution" (from 30 August 1968 single version B-side)	Lennon	3:25
9.	"Get Back" (from 11 April 1969 single version A-side)	McCartney	3:15
10.	"Don't Let Me Down" (from 11 April 1969 B-side)	Lennon	3:35
11.	"The Ballad of John and Yoko" (from 30 May 1969 A-side)	Lennon	3:00
12.	"Old Brown Shoe" (Harrison) (30 May 1969 B-side)	Harrison	3:18
13.	"Across the Universe" (12 December 1969 "Wildlife" version from the charity album No One's Gonna Change Our World)	Lennon	3:49
14.	"Let It Be" (from 6 March 1970 single version A-side)	McCartney	3:51
15.	"You Know My Name (Look Up the Number)" (from 6 March 1970 B-side; mono)	Lennon and McCartney	4:19
Total length:			51:01

=== Past Masters, Volumes One & Two (the double LP release) ===
Side one
No.	Title	Lead vocals	Length
1.	"Love Me Do" (from 5 October 1962 A-side, the original single version on Parlophone, catalogue number 45-R4949; recorded on 4 September 1962, featuring Ringo Starr on drums; mono)	Paul McCartney with John Lennon	2:24
2.	"From Me to You" (from 11 April 1963 A-side)	Lennon and McCartney	1:58
3.	"Thank You Girl" (from 11 April 1963 B-side)	Lennon and McCartney	2:04
4.	"She Loves You" (from 23 August 1963 A-side; Mono)	Lennon and McCartney	2:21
5.	"I'll Get You" (from 23 August 1963 B-side; Mono)	Lennon and McCartney	2:06
6.	"I Want to Hold Your Hand" (from 29 November 1963 A-side)	Lennon and McCartney	2:27
7.	"This Boy" (from 29 November 1963 B-side)	Lennon, with McCartney and Harrison	2:16
8.	"Komm, gib mir deine Hand" (Lennon/McCartney/Nicolas/Hellmer) (from March 1964 German single; very narrow stereo, wider stereo on 2009 remasters)	Lennon and McCartney	2:27
9.	"Sie liebt dich" (Lennon/McCartney/Nicolas/Montague) (from March 1964 German single; very narrow stereo, wider stereo on 2009 remasters)	Lennon and McCartney	2:20
Total length:			20:23

Side two
No.	Title	Lead vocals	Length
10.	"Long Tall Sally" (Johnson, Blackwell, Penniman) (from 19 June 1964 Long Tall Sally EP)	McCartney	2:03
11.	"I Call Your Name" (from Long Tall Sally EP)	Lennon	2:09
12.	"Slow Down" (Williams) (from Long Tall Sally EP)	Lennon	2:56
13.	"Matchbox" (Perkins) (from Long Tall Sally EP)	Ringo Starr	1:59
14.	"I Feel Fine" (from 27 November 1964 A-side)	Lennon	2:20
15.	"She's a Woman" (from 27 November 1964 B-side)	McCartney	3:03
16.	"Bad Boy" (Williams) (from 14 June 1965 US album Beatles VI, 10 December 1966 UK album A Collection of Beatles Oldies)	Lennon	2:21
17.	"Yes It Is" (from 9 April 1965 B-side of "Ticket to Ride")	Lennon, with McCartney and Harrison	2:43
18.	"I'm Down" (from 23 July 1965 B-side of "Help!")	McCartney	2:32
Total length:			22:06

Side three
No.	Title	Lead vocals	Length
1.	"Day Tripper" (from 3 December 1965 double A-side)	Lennon and McCartney	2:50
2.	"We Can Work It Out" (from 3 December 1965 double A-side)	McCartney	2:16
3.	"Paperback Writer" (from 10 June 1966 A-side)	McCartney	2:19
4.	"Rain" (from 10 June 1966 B-side)	Lennon	3:02
5.	"Lady Madonna" (from 15 March 1968 A-side)	McCartney	2:18
6.	"The Inner Light" (Harrison) (15 March 1968 B-side)	George Harrison	2:37
7.	"Hey Jude" (from 30 August 1968 A-side)	McCartney	7:08
8.	"Revolution" (from 30 August 1968 single version B-side)	Lennon	3:25
Total length:			25:55

Side four
No.	Title	Lead vocals	Length
9.	"Get Back" (from 11 April 1969 single version A-side)	McCartney	3:15
10.	"Don't Let Me Down" (from 11 April 1969 B-side)	Lennon	3:35
11.	"The Ballad of John and Yoko" (from 30 May 1969 A-side)	Lennon	3:00
12.	"Old Brown Shoe" (Harrison) (30 May 1969 B-side)	Harrison	3:18
13.	"Across the Universe" (12 December 1969 "Wildlife" version from the charity album No One's Gonna Change Our World)	Lennon	3:49
14.	"Let It Be" (from 6 March 1970 single version A-side)	McCartney	3:51
15.	"You Know My Name (Look Up the Number)" (from 6 March 1970 B-side; mono)	Lennon and McCartney	4:19
Total length:			25:07

== Charts and certifications ==
=== Past Masters: Volume 1 ===
==== Charts ====
Chart (1988)	Peak position
Australian (Kent Music Report)	79
UK Albums (Official Charts)	49
US Billboard 200	149

==== Certifications ====
Region	Certification	Certified units/sales
Argentina (CAPIF)	Gold	30,000^{^}
Australia (ARIA)	Gold	35,000^{^}
United Kingdom (BPI)	Gold	100,000^{*}
United States (RIAA)	Platinum	1,000,000^{^}
^{*} Sales figures based on certification alone.^{^} Shipments figures based on certification alone.

=== Past Masters: Volume 2 ===
==== Charts ====
Chart (1988)	Peak position
Australian (Kent Music Report)	75
UK Albums (Official Charts)	46
US Billboard 200	121

==== Certifications ====
Region	Certification	Certified units/sales
Argentina (CAPIF)	Gold	30,000^{^}
Australia (ARIA)	Gold	35,000^{^}
United Kingdom (BPI)	Gold	100,000^{*}
United States (RIAA)	Platinum	1,000,000^{^}
^{*} Sales figures based on certification alone.^{^} Shipments figures based on certification alone.

=== Past Masters ===
==== Charts ====
Chart (2009)	Peak position
Australian Albums (ARIA)	34
Austrian Albums (Ö3 Austria)	40
Belgian Albums (Ultratop Flanders)	53
Belgian Albums (Ultratop Wallonia)	27
Canadian Albums (Nielsen SoundScan)	16
German Albums (Offizielle Top 100)	61
Italian Albums (FIMI)	47
Dutch Albums (Album Top 100)	90
New Zealand Albums (RMNZ)	33
Portuguese Albums (AFP)	20
Spanish Albums (Promusicae)	44
Swedish Albums (Sverigetopplistan)	36
Swiss Albums (Schweizer Hitparade)	47
UK Albums (Official Charts)	31
Chart (2010)	Peak position
US Billboard 200	154

==== Certifications ====
Region	Certification	Certified units/sales
Canada (Music Canada)	Gold	40,000^{^}
United Kingdom (BPI)	Silver	60,000^{‡}
^{^} Shipments figures based on certification alone.^{‡} Sales+streaming figures based on certification alone.

== See also ==
- Outline of the Beatles
- The Beatles timeline
