= The Beatles Beat =

1964 album by the Beatles

Compilation album by The Beatles
- Released: 1964
- Label: Odeon

Professional ratings
Review scores
Source	Rating
AllMusic	4/5 stars

The Beatles Beat is a compilation album by The Beatles released in Germany on the Odeon record label in 1964.

== Track listing ==
Side 1
No.	Title	Length
1.	"She Loves You"	2:23
2.	"Thank You Girl"	2:03
3.	"From Me to You"	1:57
4.	"I'll Get You"	2:05
5.	"I Want to Hold Your Hand"	2:26
6.	"Hold Me Tight"	2:30

Side 2
No.	Title	Length
1.	"Can't Buy Me Love"	2:13
2.	"You Can't Do That"	2:36
3.	"Roll Over Beethoven"	2:45
4.	"Till There Was You"	2:16
5.	"Money"	2:49
6.	"Please Mister Postman"	2:32

== Charts ==
Monthly charts

Chart (1964)	Peak position
German Albums (Offizielle Top 100)	6
