= Komm, gib mir deine Hand / Sie liebt dich =

"Komm, gib mir deine Hand" / "Sie liebt dich"
- West German picture sleeve

Single by the Beatles
- A-side: "Komm, gib mir deine Hand" (FRG); "Sie liebt dich" (US)
- B-side: "Sie liebt dich" (FRG); "I'll Get You" (US)
- Released: March 1964 (FRG); 21 May 1964 (US)
- Recorded: 17 October 1963 and 29 January 1964
- Studio: EMI, London; EMI Pathé Marconi, Paris
- Genre: Pop
- Length: 2:26 ("Hand"); 2:19 ("dich")
- Label: Odeon 22671 (FRG); Swan 4182 (US)
- Songwriters: Lennon–McCartney; Jean Nicolas; Heinz Hellmer ("Hand"); Lee Montague ("dich")
- Producer: George Martin

The Beatles US singles chronology
"Love Me Do" (1964)	"Sie liebt dich" (1964)	"Ain't She Sweet" (1964)

"Komm, gib mir deine Hand" and "Sie liebt dich" (English: "Come, Give Me Your Hand" and "She Loves You") are German-language versions of "I Want to Hold Your Hand" and "She Loves You", respectively, by the English rock band the Beatles. John Lennon and Paul McCartney wrote the original English songs, credited to the Lennon–McCartney partnership, while Camillo Felgen wrote the translated German lyrics; Felgen is credited under several pen names. In places, his translations take major liberties with the original lyrics. Odeon Records released the German versions together as a non-album single in West Germany in March 1964. Swan Records released "Sie liebt dich", along with the original "She Loves You" B-side "I'll Get You", as a single in the United States in May 1964. Capitol included "Komm, gib mir deine Hand" as the closing track of the 1964 North American-only album Something New.

The recording of "Komm, gib mir deine Hand" and "Sie liebt dich" came at a time when it was standard practice for artists to record unique versions of songs for foreign markets. Executives from Odeon insisted with George Martin and Brian Epstein that in order for them to penetrate the German market, the Beatles would need to record German versions of their biggest songs. The Beatles opposed the idea until Martin convinced them to record. On 29 January 1964, during their only group recording session outside of the United Kingdom, (Note: On 12 January 1968, with no other Beatles present, George Harrison and a group of Indian musicians recorded the backing track to "The Inner Light" in Bombay, India.) the Beatles recorded the songs at EMI's Pathé Marconi Studios in Paris, France. For "Komm, gib mir deine Hand", they overdubbed German vocals onto the original backing track of "I Want to Hold Your Hand". The two-track tapes of "She Loves You" from July 1963 were erased after the mono master was made, forcing the Beatles to record "Sie liebt dich" entirely from scratch. The English and German versions contain differences, the most prominent being Lennon's rhythm guitar; on the former he plays his Gibson J-160E while on the latter he plays his Rickenbacker 325 Capri.

The German versions reached number one and seven in the German charts, respectively. "Sie liebt dich" reached number 97 in the Billboard Hot 100. Following these recordings, the Beatles never again made foreign versions of their songs. Commentators have credited the band's subsequent practice of only releasing their songs in the original English with helping to spread the English language across Europe and the rest of the world.

== Background and development ==
The beginning of 1964 saw the Beatles reaching international levels of fame. On 14 and 15 January, the Beatles arrived in Paris for a 19-day residency at the Olympia Theatre. On 25 January 1964, after returning to the hotel from a show, Beatles manager Brian Epstein informed them that "I Want to Hold Your Hand" had reached number one in the United States on the Cashbox Top 100 chart. On 1 February, it went to number one on the Billboard Hot 100. From this point forward, Epstein focused on promoting the Beatles to the international market. Otto Demmlar, a producer of the German sub-label of EMI, Electrola Gesellschaft, conceived the Beatles recording songs in German. Odeon Records insisted with Epstein and Beatles producer George Martin that if they wanted to sell more records in West Germany, the band would need to rerecord their biggest songs in German. At that time, recording unique versions for foreign markets was a standard practice. (Note: A related example is Tommy Facenda's 1959 single "High School USA", where he sings different lyrics over the same backing track for regional markets across the US.)

Odeon sent Luxembourger Camillo Felgen, a popular presenter from Radio Luxembourg, to make translations and meet Martin and the Beatles in Paris. (Note: Martin has provided different names for the translator. In a 1988 interview Martin remembers the translator as "a chap named Nicolas". Felgen used Jean Nicolas as one of his pseudonyms. In the 2000 book The Beatles Anthology, Martin instead remembers him as Otto Demmlar.) Felgen initially translated both sides of the original "She Loves You" single, with the A-side becoming "Sie liebt dich" and the B-side "I'll Get You" becoming "Glücklich wie noch nie". Beatles writer John C. Winn translates this back to English as "Happy like never before". Because it was a more recent hit, "I Want to Hold Your Hand" replaced "I'll Get You" and became the prospective A-side of the single, with Felgen translating the title as "Komm, gib mir deine Hand". Beatles writer Kenneth Womack translates this back to English as "Come on, give me your hand" while Winn translates it as "Come, give me your hand". Felgen translated under several pen names, including Jean Nicolas and Lee Montague. The credits on "Komm, gib mir deine Hand" are Lennon–McCartney–Nicolas–Hellmer while the credits on "Sie liebt dich" are Lennon–McCartney–Nicolas–Montague. Although Camillo Felgen (alias Jean Nicolas) is credited as the translator of "Komm, gib mir deine Hand", the German lyrics were written exclusively by Monique Falk, alias Heinz Hellmer.

Musicologist Walter Everett writes that both translations take great liberties. He singles out the chorus of "Sie liebt dich" in particular, which became, "Sie liebt dich / yeah, yeah, yeah / denn mit dir allein / kann sie nur glücklich sein." These lyrics translate to English as: "She loves you / yeah, yeah, yeah / for with you alone / can she only be happy." In his book Revolution in the Head, Ian MacDonald says, "The German rewrite didn't go so far as insisting on 'ja, ja, ja'." Womack writes that a more direct translation of "I Want to Hold Your Hand" would be "Ich möchte deine Hand halten".

== Recording ==
On 24 January 1964 at EMI Recording Studios, engineer Norman Smith made a tape-to-tape copy of the basic rhythm track of "I Want to Hold Your Hand" from take 17 of the original 17 October 1963 session. The tape was brought by Martin and Smith during their travels to Paris, where they met with the Beatles. On 29 January 1964, the Beatles were due in the studio to record the German translations. In an interview for Mark Lewisohn's 1988 book The Complete Beatles Recording Sessions, Martin recalled of the day:

I fixed the session for late-morning. Norman Smith, myself, and the translator, a chap named Nicolas, all got to the studio on time, but there was no sign of the Beatles. We waited an hour before I telephoned their suite at the George V hotel. Neil Aspinall answered, "They're in bed, they've decided not to go to the studio". I went crazy – it was the first time they had refused to do anything for me. "You tell them they've got to come, otherwise I shall be so angry it isn't true! I'm coming over right now". So the German and I jumped into a taxi, we got to the hotel and I barged into their suite, to be met by this incredible sight, right out of the Mad Hatter's tea party. Jane Asher – Paul [McCartney]'s girlfriend – with her long red hair, was pouring tea from a china pot, and the others were sitting around her like March Hares. They took one look at me and exploded, like in a school room when the headmaster enters. Some dived onto the sofa and hid behind cushions, others dashed behind curtains. "You are bastards!" I screamed, to which they responded with impish little grins and roguish apologies. Within minutes we were on our way to the studio.

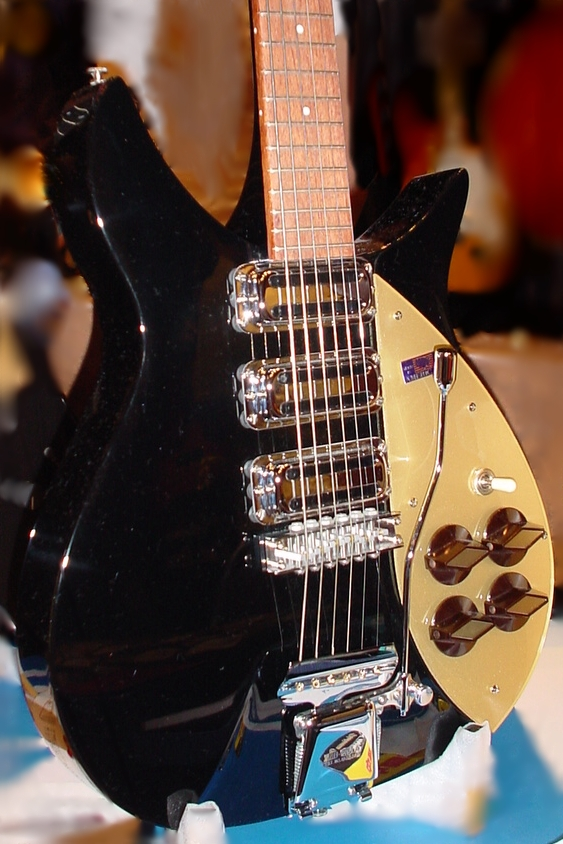
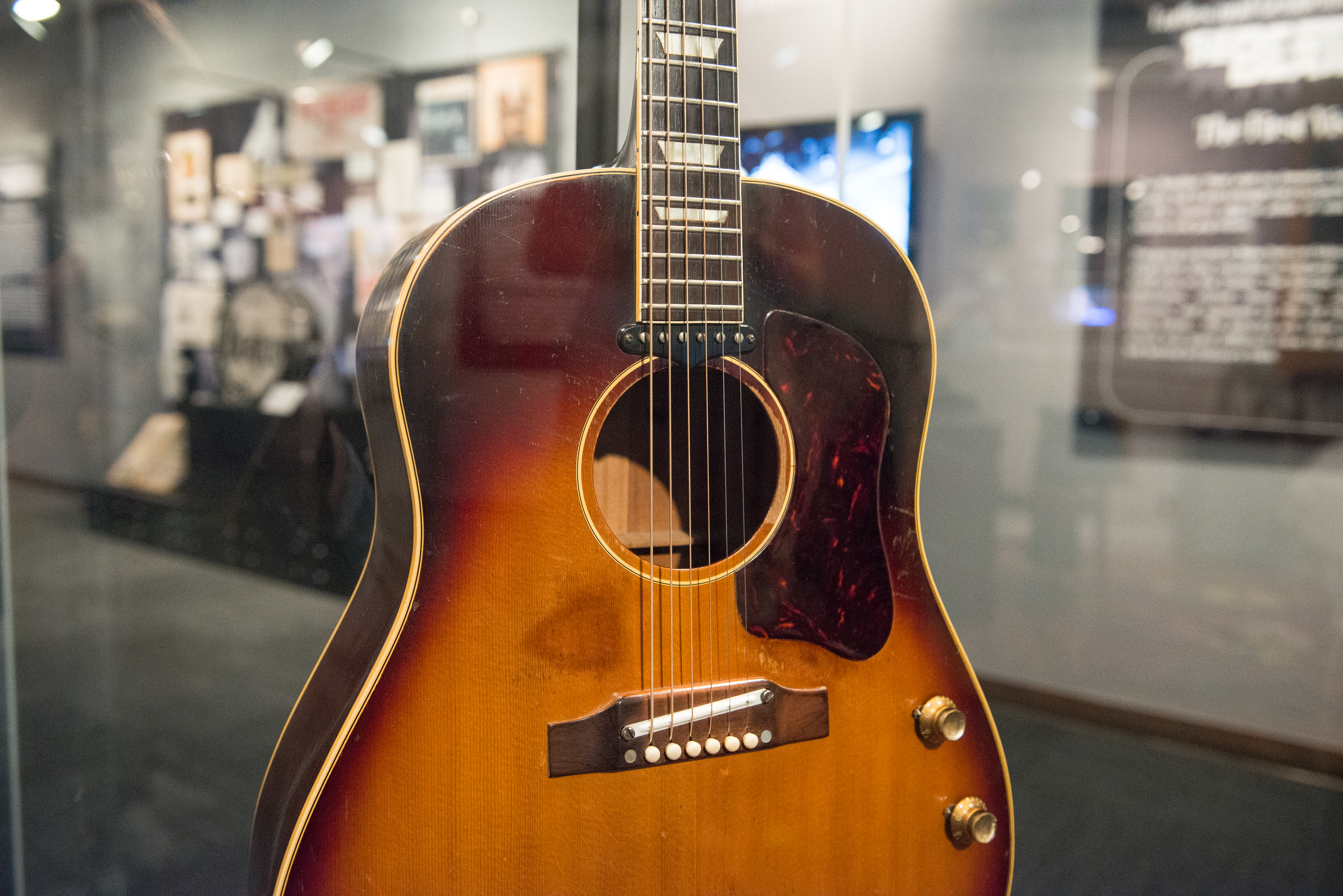
On "Sie liebt dich", John Lennon plays his Rickenbacker 325 Capri (left) because the Gibson J-160E (right) heard on "She Loves You" went missing.

The Beatles recorded "Komm, gib mir deine Hand" and "Sie liebt dich", along with McCartney's new song "Can't Buy Me Love", at EMI's Pathé Marconi Studios in Paris. This was their first recording session outside Abbey Road and the band's only one outside of the United Kingdom. "Komm, gib mir deine Hand" was the first of three songs recorded that day. Martin produced it, being supported by engineers Smith and Jacques Esmenjaud. Smith recalled, "I found the studio very odd to work in, the equipment was alien to anything we were used to", and, "[There] was absolutely no atmosphere!" The original rhythm track was mixed down from four-track to two-track. The Beatles overdubbed German vocals and handclaps across 11 takes, as well as George Harrison's Country Gent. Takes five and seven were marked "best" and edited together, along with a handclap overdub. The original two-track tape of "She Loves You", recorded on 1 July 1963, had been erased after the mono master was finished, meaning the Beatles needed to record "Sie liebt dich" entirely from scratch. They recorded a new rhythm track in 13 takes. John Lennon's rhythm guitar distinguishes the German and English backing tracks from one another. In July 1963 on "She Loves You", he plays his Gibson J-160E, a guitar later stolen in early January 1964 during the Beatles' 1963–64 Christmas show. (Note: The Beatles' Christmas Show ran at Astoria Cinema, Finsbury Park, London from 24 December 1963 to 11 January 1964.) For "Sie liebt dich", he instead plays his Rickenbacker 325 Capri. (Note: This Rickenbacker 325 Capri was significantly worn by the time of recording. In February 1964, Rickenbacker gifted Lennon a replacement Jetglo-black Capri. He retired the original guitar until sessions for his 1980 album Double Fantasy.) The Beatles overdubbed German vocals in a single take – take 14. Smith recalled, "They were extremely pleased to get it over with ... we all were." The Beatles worked quicker than anticipated and so cancelled a second session booked for two days later on 31 January 1964. They used their remaining studio time to record four takes of "Can't Buy Me Love".

On 10 March 1964, while the Beatles filmed A Hard Day's Night, Martin, assisted by Smith, mixed "Komm, gib mir deine Hand" and "Sie liebt dich" for mono at EMI Recording Studios. He used the combined edit of takes five and seven for the former and take 14 for the latter. Two days after the initial mix, they mixed the songs for stereo, equalizing, compressing and adding echo as well. Copies of the mixes were sent to West Germany and the United States. Everett comments that the most noticeable differences between the mixes of "Komm, gib mir deine Hand" and "I Want to Hold Your Hand" are Lennon's compressed Capri guitar, which is heard more freely in the German version, and Harrison's Gent guitar, which has a different bass register.

== Release and impact ==
The custom of recording special versions for foreign markets, standard practice at the time, was never afterwards bothered with by the Beatles and consequently fell into disuse. The resulting promotion of the English language around the world is one of their most substantial, and least documented, achievements.

— Ian MacDonald, Revolution in the Head

Odeon released the German single of "Komm, gib mir deine Hand" b/w "Sie liebt dich" across West Germany in March 1964. (Note: Both Walter Everett and Barry Miles write the single was released in West Germany on 5 March 1964, though the songs were not mixed for mono and stereo until 10 and 12 March, respectively. John C. Winn says the single was rush-released in West Germany after mixing, but does not provide a release date. Both tracks entered the German charts in April 1964.) The songs reached number one and seven in the German charts, respectively. In Denmark, the single reached number 15. Sourced from the German release, Parlophone released the single in Australia during June 1964, though it failed to chart. Swan Records, a small Philadelphia-based record label mainly known for novelty records, obtained the US rights to "She Loves You" in September 1963. After the Beatles recorded "Sie liebt dich", Swan argued they likewise held the rights to that song. Swan released "Sie liebt dich" b/w "I'll Get You" in the US on 21 May 1964. The single was on the Billboard Hot 100 for one week, peaking at number 97. Capitol Records included "Komm, gib mir deine Hand" as the closing track on the Beatles' North American album Something New in July 1964. Beatles biographer Jonathan Gould refers to this as "an added curiosity". MacDonald ascribes the inclusion to Capitol being "newly anxious to exploit every last scrap of Beatles product ..." Both Everett and Winn write that the songs were released in the US because of the American public's desperation for new Beatles material. Following these recordings, the Beatles never recorded foreign versions of their songs again. (Note: In July 1968, McCartney produced Mary Hopkin for her first single with Apple, "Those Were the Days". Though she opposed the idea, McCartney directed her to rerecord the song in Italian, Spanish, French and German. Everett comments, "This was a successful maneuver, but could he have forgotten how he'd bristled over the 'Sie liebt dich' / 'Komm, gib mir deine Hand' episode in 1964?")

In The Beatles Anthology, Martin reflected of the songs: "They were the only things they have ever done in a foreign language. And they didn't need to anyway [...] The records would have sold in English, and did." By the end of 1963, the Beatles had already achieved hits in Sweden and Finland without needing to record translated versions. Peter Doggett credits the Beatles popularity with helping spread the English language throughout Europe, especially among young people. MacDonald offers similar sentiments, but goes further, asserting they helped spread English around the world.

Parlophone released both tracks for the first time in the UK on the 1978 compilation album Rarities. This was the first stereo release of "Sie liebt dich" anywhere. In addition, the release eliminates a stray English word ("coming") present on the original stereo version of "Komm, gib mir deine Hand". In the US, "Komm, gib mir deine Hand" remained readily available on re-releases of Something New. "Sie liebt dich" however fell out of print after its 1964 release. The song remained unavailable in the US until Capitol included the stereo version on the 1980 American compilation album Rarities. Both tracks were first released on compact disc for the 1988 compilation Past Masters, Volume One. The stereo and mono tracks were remastered and included on the 2009 releases Past Masters and Mono Masters.

"Komm, gib mir deine Hand" is featured in the 2019 World War II film Jojo Rabbit, directed by Taika Waititi, and its soundtrack. After initially being denied, the film's composer Michael Giacchino helped secure the rights to the song by contacting McCartney, with whom he had previously worked with.

== Personnel ==
"Komm, gib mir deine Hand"

According to Everett, Winn and MacDonald:

- John Lennon – vocal, rhythm guitar, handclaps
- Paul McCartney – vocal, bass, handclaps
- George Harrison – lead guitar, handclaps
- Ringo Starr – drums, handclaps

"Sie liebt dich"

According to Lewisohn and MacDonald:

- John Lennon – vocal, rhythm guitar
- Paul McCartney – vocal, bass
- George Harrison – harmony vocal, lead guitar
- Ringo Starr – drums

== Charts ==
Weekly chart performance for "Komm, gib mir deine Hand"
Chart (1964)	Peak position
Denmark (Salgshitlisterne Top 20)	15
West Germany (Musikmarkt)	1

Weekly chart performance for "Sie liebt dich"
Chart (1964)	Peak position
US Billboard Hot 100	97
West Germany (Musikmarkt)	7
