= I'm Down =

1965 single by the Beatles

- US picture sleeve (reverse)

Single by the Beatles
- A-side: "Help!"
- Released: 19 July 1965
- Recorded: 14 June 1965
- Studio: EMI, London
- Genre: Rock and roll
- Length: 2:32
- Label: Capitol (US); Parlophone (UK)
- Songwriter: Lennon–McCartney
- Producer: George Martin

The Beatles UK singles chronology
"Ticket to Ride" (1965)	"Help!" / "I'm Down" (1965)	"We Can Work It Out" / "Day Tripper" (1965)

The Beatles US singles chronology
"Ticket to Ride" (1965)	"Help!" / "I'm Down" (1965)	"Yesterday" (1965)

"I'm Down" is a song by the English rock band the Beatles, written by Paul McCartney and credited to Lennon–McCartney. It was released on a non-album single as the B-side to "Help!" in July 1965. The song originated in McCartney's attempt to write a song in the style of Little Richard, whose song "Long Tall Sally" the band regularly covered.

Inspired by 1950s R&B and rock and roll numbers, the song's lyrics sing of an unrequited love, but rather than a lament are instead performed in a hysterical, "celebratory frenzy" of self assuredness. Some commentators interpret the song's tone as partially parodic. Melodically uncomplicated, the composition uses only three basic chords. The Beatles recorded "I'm Down" during sessions for their album Help! in June 1965. The first song by the band to incorporate a Vox Continental electric organ, John Lennon plays the instrument in the style of Jerry Lee Lewis, doing glissandos with his elbow. In the decade following its release, the song became a comparative rarity among the band's recordings. It has subsequently appeared on compilation albums such as Rock 'n' Roll Music; the UK edition of Rarities; Past Masters, Volume One and Mono Masters.

"I'm Down" has received praise from several music critics and musicologists, with several mentioning McCartney's strong vocal and the band's raucous performance. The Beatles regularly performed the song during their 1965 and 1966 tours as the closing number, including an especially chaotic performance in August 1965 depicted in the documentary The Beatles at Shea Stadium. Beastie Boys and Aerosmith are among the artists that have covered the song.

== Background and composition ==
I could do Little Richard's voice, which is a wild, hoarse, screaming thing, it's like an out-of-body experience. You have to leave your current sensibilities and go about a foot above your head to sing it. ... A lot of people were fans of Little Richard so I used to sing his stuff but there came a point when I wanted one of my own, so I wrote "I'm Down".

— Paul McCartney, 1997

In November 1963, Paul McCartney moved into the family home of his girlfriend, Jane Asher, located at 57 Wimpole Street in central London. He later recalled writing "I'm Down" in the family music room in the basement of the house. Written in the style of Little Richard, the song began as an attempt to replace "Twist and Shout" and "Long Tall Sally" as the closing number of the Beatles' concert tour set list. In an October 1964 interview, McCartney explained that he and John Lennon had been trying for years to write a song like "Long Tall Sally", and that the closest they had come was with their song "I Saw Her Standing There". Comparing the writing process of Little Richard-like songs to abstract painting, he further explained: "[p]eople think of 'Long Tall Sally' and say it sounds so easy to write. But it's the most difficult thing we've attempted. Writing a three-chord song that's clever is not easy". In his authorised biography, Many Years From Now, McCartney remembers "I'm Down" as entirely his composition, but raises the possibility that Lennon added a few lyrics or made minor suggestions in the writing process. In a 1972 interview, Lennon credits the song to only McCartney, but in his 1980 Playboy interview he instead suggests he provided "a little help". Musicologist Walter Everett argues that McCartney often forgetting the song's lyrics in concerts suggests he wrote the song quickly and with little practice.

"I'm Down" is in the key of G major and is in 4/4 (common time). A simple twelve-bar blues number extended into fourteen-bars, the song uses only the chords I, IV and V. One of the few Beatles songs to feature a simple verse form, musicologist Alan W. Pollack suggests that, in the context of the Beatles' 1965 compositions, its simple format is stylistically regressive. The song opens with a solo vocal from McCartney, which music critic Tim Riley sees as the part of the song bearing the most resemblance to "Long Tall Sally", with "one mad voice screaming at the top of its lungs". With neither bass nor drums to clarify the key or downbeat, Pollack writes that "no matter how many times you've heard the song", McCartney's opening vocal is "an effect which retains the power to startle". The repeating refrains incorporate improvisational scat singing and, according to Pollack, get "successively wilder and less structured" with each repeating. Everett writes the concluding coda serves the purpose of "[raising] the rock-and-roll spirit to a higher level of excitement than does the song proper".

The song's lyrics tell the story from the perspective of a pained lover who is frustrated due to an unrequited love. Rather than a lament, the music functions as a "celebratory frenzy" of self assuredness. Pollack writes the song's style originates in a 1950s R&B cliché, being "a semi-improvisatory rave-up" where the lyrics are unimportant compared to the tone in which they are sung. Riley describes the song as an instance of "dancing on your problems", as heard in rock and roll oldies like "That's All Right" and "Blue Suede Shoes". Author Ian MacDonald suggests that, besides being a blues send-up, the lyrics are "a tongue-in-cheek response to Lennon's anguished self-exposure in 'Help!'", opining that the song's "pseudo-hysterics" began as a joke. Riley similarly describes the song as partially parodic, singling out the backing vocals' response of "I'm really down".

== Recording ==
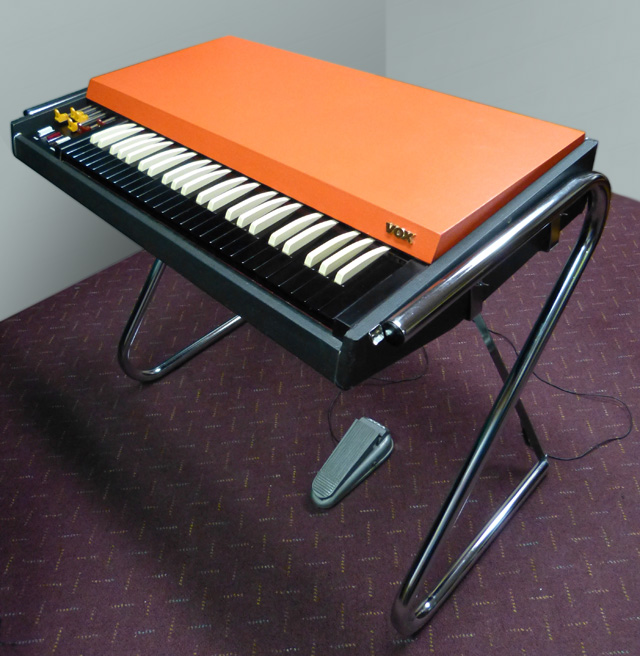
A 1965 Vox Continental electric organ, similar to the one John Lennon plays on "I'm Down".

The Beatles recorded "I'm Down" on 14 June 1965 during a session for their fifth album, Help!, in which they also recorded McCartney's songs "I've Just Seen a Face" and "Yesterday". Recording in EMI's Studio Two, George Martin produced the session, assisted by balance engineer Norman Smith. The song's basic track features McCartney singing and playing bass, George Harrison on electric guitar and Ringo Starr on drums. On the band's first take, the song did not yet have a definitive ending, McCartney telling Harrison and Starr after the last chorus to "keep it going". (Note: Take one was included on the Beatles' 1996 compilation Anthology 2. Following the take, McCartney says the phrase "Plastic soul, man", foreshadowing the title of the band's sixth album, Rubber Soul.) The final attempt – take seven – was marked "best".

The band overdubbed several parts onto take seven. Lennon and Harrison provided backing vocals, with Lennon singing in a low register, dropping to G during the choruses. Starr added further percussion with bongos while Harrison added a new guitar solo. (Note: Everett writes Starr played a conga, while several authors – including Mark Lewisohn, MacDonald, John C. Winn and Jean-Michael Guesdon & Philippe Margotin – write he played bongos.) Lennon added an organ solo with a Vox Continental electric organ – the first Beatles recording to feature the instrument – playing glissandos with his elbow in the style of American musician Jerry Lee Lewis. (Note: In Everett's 2001 book The Beatles as Musicians, he identifies the instrument as a Hammond organ, but in his 2009 book The Foundations of Rock, he refers to it as a Vox Continental. Among other authors, Andy Babiuk, MacDonald, Winn and Guesdon & Margotin identify it as a Vox Continental, while Kenneth Womack says it is a Hammond organ.)

On 18 June, Martin and Scott returned to Studio Two to remix the track, along with the rest of the Help! album, for mono and stereo. The mixes are slightly different, with the stereo fading out two seconds earlier than the mono. On the stereo version, another overdubbed guitar solo is slightly audible, likely due to audio leakage from other microphones.

== Release and reception ==
Capitol issued "I'm Down" in the US as the B-side of "Help!" on 19 July 1965, with EMI's Parlophone label releasing the same single in the UK four days later. While "Help!" reached number one in both countries, "I'm Down" did not chart, but did appear at number 101 on Billboard magazine's Bubbling Under Hot 100 chart.

"I'm Down" remained relatively elusive among Beatles songs after its initial release, with critics and fans criticising Apple Records manager Allen Klein for omitting it from the 1973 compilation album 1962–1966. Capitol first included the song on an LP in June 1976, appearing on the double album compilation Rock 'n' Roll Music. While authors Nicholas Schaffner and Robert Rodriguez are each generally critical of the compilation, they count the inclusion of "I'm Down" as one of the album's redeeming features. Rather than using the 18 June 1965 stereo mix, Martin remixed the song for the release from the original four-track tapes. The song has since appeared on the 1978 British compilation album Rarities, but was omitted from the 1980 US LP of the same name. Parlophone used Martin's 1976 stereo remix when they included the song on the compilation album Past Masters, Volume One, released on CD in March 1988. The mono mix was subsequently included on the Beatles' Mono Masters compilation.

Writing for AllMusic, Stephen Thomas Erlewine calls the song "peerless" and that it demonstrated the Beatles' ability to "rock really, really hard". Ian MacDonald describes the song as an American rock-and-roll classic and a "demented raver" which illustrates the musical versatility of McCartney. Journalist Mark Hertsgaard calls the track "a wildly raucous rock 'n' roller" and "a rock 'n' roll raver, pure and simple", with McCartney's powerful vocal evoking "Long Tall Sally" while anticipating "Helter Skelter". Scholar Michael Frontani similarly compares McCartney's vocal to "Long Tall Sally", while also mentioning the "rock and roll shout" of his 1971 solo B-side "Oh Woman, Oh Why". Hertsgaard further praises the band's intense backing, singling out Lennon's organ contribution, which "all but literally [catches] fire". Barry Miles calls the song an "uptempo rocker", and Pollack calls it "raucous" and "rough-shod", with one of the most primal McCartney screams heard on a Lennon–McCartney original. Everett compares the song's style to both Little Richard and American rock and roll singer Larry Williams, and adds that the same style was later captured by the American rock band Creedence Clearwater Revival with their 1970 song "Travelin' Band". In 2011, the editors of Rolling Stone magazine ranked "I'm Down" at number 56 in their list of the "100 Greatest Beatles Songs".

== Other versions ==
=== The Beatles live performances ===
In August 1965, the Beatles purchased a new electric organ, a Vox Continental Mk I, using it for all subsequent performances of the song. The band regularly performed "I'm Down" during their 1965 and 1966 tours, incorporating it as their closing number. McCartney later recalled that it worked particularly well at large concert venues and was "a good stage song".

Because I did the organ on "I'm Down", I decided to play it on stage for the first time. I didn't really know what to do, because I felt naked without a guitar, so I was doing all Jerry Lee [Lewis] – I was jumping about and I only played about two bars of it.

— John Lennon on playing at Shea Stadium, 1965

The band's 15 August 1965 concert at Shea Stadium in New York City was filmed and became the centrepiece of the documentary film The Beatles at Shea Stadium, released in the UK and US in March 1966 and January 1967, respectively. (Note: Played in front of 55,600 fans, the concert was to that point the largest ever held.) Though "I'm Down" closed the concert, the film was edited to show it as the opening number. Due to the overwhelming sound of audience screaming, technical issues with the live recording and musical mistakes on the part of the Beatles, the band re-recorded and overdubbed sections of the film's soundtrack on 5 January 1966 at CTS Studios, London. Among the fixes to "I'm Down" were overdubs of a new bass line by McCartney and a new organ part by Lennon. The song's original performance was chaotic, with Lennon and Harrison fumbling their backing vocals as they burst into laughter, McCartney spinning in excitement and Lennon playing the organ with his elbow. Lennon's rough use of the instrument resulted in it malfunctioning at their next show, played in Toronto two days later. (Note: After arriving the next day in Atlanta, Georgia, the group arranged for a replacement organ from a local dealer, The Vox Shoppe. The owner exchanged the organs, auctioning it off decades later. The organ sold at auction again in 2008, reaching US$182,500 (equivalent to $270,000 in 2025).) In The Beatles Anthology, Starr reminisced that while watching Lennon during the song, he felt Lennon "cracked up" and "went mad; not mentally ill, but he just got crazy. He was playing the piano with his elbows and it was really strange". Riley suggests that Lennon's unhinged keyboard playing on "I'm Down" reflected the absurdity of the Beatles' live shows, and that "[t]he band's hysteria on this song [mirrored] their fans' deafening adulation".

=== Covers ===
The American hip hop group Beastie Boys recorded a cover of "I'm Down" for their 1986 debut studio album, Licensed to Ill. Produced by Rick Rubin, the recording samples elements of the original track while replacing the original organ solo with a guitar solo. Its inclusion on the album was blocked by the copyright owner, musician Michael Jackson, because he disapproved of several of the cover's altered lyrics, including: "I keep a loaded pistol inside my pants / Find a def girl and do the new dance." The record has since circulated as a bootleg. Music critic Rob Sheffield opines that the Beastie Boys' version "lives up to the garage-band vandalism of the original".

American rock band Aerosmith covered the song for their 1987 album Permanent Vacation. Dave Reynolds' review of the album in Metal Forces magazine calls the cover "superb", and John Franck of AllMusic describes it as "well executed". Though music critic Robert Christgau is generally negative in his review of the album, he refers to their version of "I'm Down" as an "ace Beatle cover". Sheffield disparages the attempt, writing Aerosmith "[gives] it a professional polish that makes it meaningless".

== Personnel ==
According to Ian MacDonald, except where noted:

- Paul McCartney – vocal, bass guitar
- John Lennon – backing vocal, rhythm guitar, Vox Continental electric organ
- George Harrison – backing vocal, lead guitar
- Ringo Starr – drums, bongos
