= Denis O'Dell =

British film producer (1923–2021)

- Born: 2 May 1923; Kensington, London, England
- Died: 30 December 2021 (aged 98); Almería, Spain
- Education: University of Birmingham
- Occupation: Film producer
- Years active: 1956–1980, 2021

Denis O'Dell (2 May 1923 – 30 December 2021) was a British film producer, best known for his work on films featuring The Beatles, including A Hard Day's Night and the telefilm Magical Mystery Tour, he was the director of the Beatles newly founded Apple Corps and the Head of Apple Films. He retired in 1980.

The Beatles referenced his name in the lyrics of "You Know My Name (Look Up the Number)".

== Biography ==
O'Dell was born in the London district of Kensington in 1923 to John and Elizabeth O'Dell.

O'Dell retired to the Spanish city of Almería, which he persuaded several Hollywood directors, including Steven Spielberg and Ridley Scott, to use as a filming location.

O'Dell died at his home in Almería from lung cancer on 30 December 2021, at the age of 98. He had four children with his wife, Donna, including producer Denise O'Dell. He was also the maternal grandfather of producer Denis Pedregosa.

== Filmography ==
- It's a Wonderful World (1956 film) (1956)
- Tread Softly Stranger (1958)
- A Hard Day's Night (1964) - Producer
- The Bedford Incident (1965) Associate Producer
- Magical Mystery Tour (1967) Associate Producer
- How I Won the War (1967)
- The Magic Christian (1969)
- Petulia
- Heaven's Gate (1980)
- Robin and Marian
