= I'll Get You =

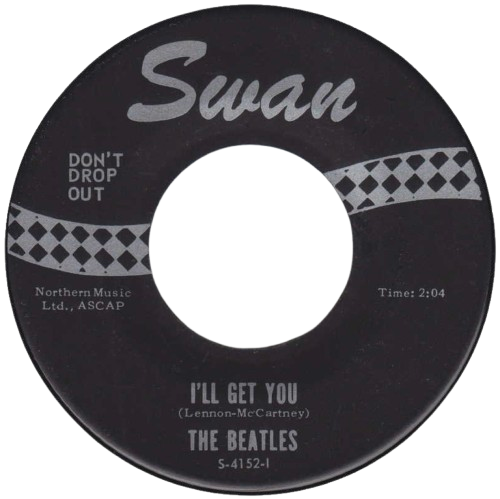
- US single label

Single by the Beatles
- A-side: "She Loves You" (UK & US 1st release); "Sie liebt dich" (US 2nd release)
- Released: 23 August 1963 (UK); 16 September 1963 (US "She Loves You" single); 21 May 1964 (US "Sie liebt dich" single)
- Recorded: 1 July 1963
- Studio: EMI, London
- Genre: Merseybeat
- Length: 2:04
- Label: Parlophone (UK); Swan (US)
- Songwriter: Lennon–McCartney
- Producer: George Martin

The Beatles singles chronology
"From Me to You" (1963)	"She Loves You" / "I'll Get You" (1963)	"I Want to Hold Your Hand" (1963)

"I'll Get You" is a song by the English rock band the Beatles, written by John Lennon and Paul McCartney, and released by the Beatles as the B-side of their 1963 single "She Loves You". The song was initially titled "Get You in the End".

== Structure ==
Typical of the Beatles' vocal style of that period, John Lennon and Paul McCartney sing in unison for the majority of the track, allowing the few occasions when they do harmonise to stand out. However, unlike most Beatles songs of the time, there was no lead guitar break; the lead guitar was virtually reduced to a second rhythm guitar. The most prominent instruments in the track are McCartney's "plumply rounded bass" and Lennon's harmonica, which was overdubbed in a rush as session time ran out.

McCartney credits the song as a 50 / 50 collaboration. He recalls using Lennon's Menlove Avenue home as the writing base for the song. That was rare because Lennon's Aunt Mimi, whom Lennon still lived with at the time, disapproved of the Beatles.

The song's opening line, "Imagine I'm in love with you," was innovative, drawing the listener immediately into the story. McCartney would cite it as an early example of Lewis Carroll's influence on Lennon's lyrics—a ploy explored again in later compositions such as "Lucy in the Sky with Diamonds", "Strawberry Fields Forever" and Lennon's solo "Imagine". Reiterating its A-side's catchphrase ("Yeah"), and assuming the heavy scouse accents conspicuous on their early records, Lennon and McCartney "drawl their way through a mock-naïve love lyric". McCartney later singled out the chord change underneath "It's not like me to pretend" as unusual (moving from a D major to A minor), and crediting the Joan Baez rendition of the folk song "All My Trials" as inspiration. "I [also] liked that slightly faggy way we sang: 'Oh yeah, oh yeah', which was very distinctive, very Beatley." Looking back in 1967, Lennon said: "Ever heard anyone from Liverpool singing 'yes'? It’s yeah!".

== Release ==
The song was initially released as the B-side of She Loves You on two occasions, firstly on 28 August 1963 in the United Kingdom, and then on 16 September in the United States. It was also released in the US only on 21 May 1964 as the B-side of "Sie liebt dich", a German language recording of the previous A-side. Both were released on the Swan Records label in the United States—the only Beatles releases on that label (the British release was on Parlophone).

The song was also released in the US on 10 April 1964 on the Capitol Records album The Beatles' Second Album. It was not released on album in the UK until the Rarities release as part of the set The Beatles Collection. A live version of the song, recorded at the London Palladium on 13 October 1963, is included on Anthology 1. A version was also recorded at the BBC Paris studios in London on 16 July 1963 for airing on programme nine of the "Pop Go The Beatles" radio series and has currently not been made officially available. Another BBC performance, recorded on 7 September 1963, was officially issued in 2013 on On Air – Live at the BBC Volume 2.

The song is available on compact disc in the first volume of the two-disc Past Masters compilation.

In 2025, this 62-year-old track made the Official Charts Company's Physical Singles Chart in the UK reaching #9.

== Missing master tape ==
No original master tapes of "I'll Get You" are known to exist. Standard procedure at Abbey Road Studios at the time was to erase the original two-track session tape for singles once they had been "mixed down" to the (usually monaural) master tape used to press records. This was the fate of two Beatles singles (four songs): "Love Me Do"/"P.S. I Love You" and "She Loves You"/"I'll Get You".

== Personnel ==
- John Lennon – lead vocals, acoustic guitar, harmonica
- Paul McCartney – lead vocals, bass guitar
- George Harrison – electric guitar, harmony vocals
- Ringo Starr – drums

Personnel per Ian MacDonald
