= A Collection of Beatles Oldies =

1966 compilation album by the Beatles

Greatest hits album by the Beatles
- Released: 9 December 1966
- Recorded: 1963–1966
- Studios: EMI, London; Pathé Marconi, Paris
- Genres: Rock; pop
- Length: 39:46
- Label: Parlophone
- Producer: George Martin

The Beatles chronology
| Revolver (1966) | A Collection of Beatles Oldies (1966) | Sgt. Pepper's Lonely Hearts Club Band (1967) |

A Collection of Beatles Oldies (subtitled But Goldies!) is a compilation album by the English rock band the Beatles. Released in the United Kingdom on 9 December 1966, it features hit singles and other songs issued by the group between 1963 and 1966. The compilation served as a stopgap release to satisfy EMI's demand for product during the Christmas period, since the Beatles had only begun recording Sgt. Pepper's Lonely Hearts Club Band, the follow-up to their Revolver album, late the previous month. It was the band's first official greatest hits collection, although the Beatles had no involvement in the album.

The album's preparation and release coincided with rumours in the press that the group were on the verge of splitting up. This speculation was encouraged by the band members' high-profile individual activities since completing their final US tour, in late August 1966, and the announcement that, unlike in previous years, the Beatles would not be performing any concerts in Britain at the end of the year. The album cover is a painting combining contemporary psychedelic and op art themes and was commissioned by the band's manager, Brian Epstein. To followers of the "Paul is dead" rumour, the artwork offered the first clues relating to the alleged demise of Paul McCartney and his replacement in the Beatles by a lookalike, a scenario that is said to have taken place in November 1966 and been facilitated by the group's retirement from live performance.

A Collection of Beatles Oldies offered the debut album release in Britain for many of the band's singles, although these songs had been available on compilation EPs since their initial release. It also provided the debut release in stereo for these recordings, since the Beatles favoured mono mixes for their singles until 1969. The compilation peaked at number 7 on the UK Albums Chart, where all the band's previous albums had held the top spot. It was also released in some other European countries and, in 1968, in Australia. The album was deleted from the Beatles' catalogue following the reissue of their albums on compact disc in 1987.

== Background ==
The Beatles made the decision to retire from live performance in 1966, dissatisfied at playing to audiences of screaming fans, and following a series of controversies that had tarnished the band's image throughout the year. Those controversies included the unfavourable reaction to the butcher cover originally used for the band's American album Yesterday and Today, death threats and political incidents during their visits to Japan and the Philippines, and condemnation from some religious groups in America in response to John Lennon's comment that the Beatles had become more popular than Christ. After completing their world tour on 29 August, the four band members took a break from group activities for three months. (Note: Lennon went to Germany and then Spain to film a role in the comedy How I Won the War, while George Harrison travelled to India to further his sitar studies under the Indian classical musician Ravi Shankar. Ringo Starr spent time at home with his wife and child before briefly joining Lennon in Spain. Paul McCartney attended cultural events in London, worked on the film score to The Family Way with producer George Martin, and then holidayed in Europe and Kenya.) Due to the attention that their individual activities received, by early November, rumours in the press claimed that the band were breaking up. Alternatively, according to a report in The Sunday Telegraph, the Beatles were to sever ties with their longtime manager, Brian Epstein, and instead be represented by Allen Klein. Fans of the band were disappointed by the announcement that, in a break from the tradition established in 1963, the Beatles were not playing any UK shows over the Christmas period. On 10 November, four days after 200 fans had demonstrated outside Epstein's home in central London, newspapers reported that there would be no further concert tours by the Beatles. (Note: Epstein had also turned down a request for the group to perform in an all-star television special for victims of the Aberfan colliery disaster, a decision that attracted further criticism. He and the Beatles instead donated £1000 (equivalent to £16,266 in 2025) to the Aberfan disaster fund.)

I doubt whether [the public] realise what an explosive LP Revolver really is. They've covered such new and important territory. While they are creating albums like Revolver, how can the public expect much more of them?

— Brian Epstein defending the Beatles' lack of activity in late 1966

Although Epstein voiced support for the Beatles' continuing evolution as artists, highlighting the advances they had made with their August 1966 album Revolver, this period was one of doubt and anxiety for him. As a manager who thrived on organising the group's concert appearances, he began to worry that their enormous popularity might be coming to an end, or would diminish in the absence of new musical product. In the Beatles' absence, The Monkees – a television show starring four California-based musician-actors, brought together as a Beatles-like act – had first aired in September and soon won over the teenybopper audience that the band had sought to lose. In late October, Epstein informed EMI that, unlike in the previous three years, no new Beatles material would be ready in time for a Christmas release. As a result, the record company planned a compilation album, titled A Collection of Beatles Oldies (But Goldies!), for release in Britain and other territories overseen by EMI.

According to their press officer, Tony Barrow, the Beatles were opposed to the release of the compilation. The band returned to work on 24 November, when they began the recording sessions for their album Sgt. Pepper's Lonely Hearts Club Band. Although an article in Melody Maker stated that the band would issue a new single in December, the only other scheduled release, aside from the new compilation, was the Beatles' annual fan-club Christmas record. (Note: Pressure from the band's record company led to two songs that were intended for Sgt. Pepper, "Strawberry Fields Forever" and "Penny Lane", being released instead as a double A-side single in February 1967.) Writing in 1977, author Nicholas Schaffner commented that it was surprising that EMI's US counterpart, Capitol Records, did not also issue the compilation album, given the company's policy of maximising the number of Beatles releases in North America.

== Preparation ==
=== Song selection ===
A Collection of Beatles Oldies was the band's first official greatest-hits set and their eighth official album release in Britain. (Note: Outside the main markets of the UK and the US, however, EMI's subsidiary Odeon Records had released greatest hits albums such as The Beatles Beat (1964) in West Germany and Les Beatles dans leurs 14 plus grands succès (1965) in France.) The album was hurriedly prepared, to satisfy EMI's concerns. A cover version of Larry Williams' "Bad Boy" was the sole new track for the UK market, although it had already been released in the United States on the Capitol album Beatles VI in June 1965. Thirteen of the fifteen other songs had been issued as singles, all of which had topped the national chart compiled by Record Retailer magazine (subsequently adopted as the UK Singles Chart). "Love Me Do" and "Please Please Me", the Beatles' first two hit singles, were not included.

The compilation provided the debut UK album release for the following singles tracks: "From Me to You", "She Loves You", "I Want to Hold Your Hand", "I Feel Fine", "Day Tripper", "We Can Work It Out" and "Paperback Writer". The two songs that had not been issued as UK singles (apart from "Bad Boy"), "Yesterday" and "Michelle", had each been number 1 hits in other European countries overseen by EMI. (Note: "Yesterday" was also the title track of a March 1966 EP, which had topped Record Retailer's EPs chart, and "Michelle" was one of the four Rubber Soul tracks included on the Nowhere Man EP in July that same year.) Aside from their appearances on albums or as standalone singles, most of the songs on A Collection of Beatles Oldies had also been available on the various compilation EPs issued by EMI since 1963, one of which was the December 1965 release The Beatles' Million Sellers. EMI therefore pushed for the inclusion of "Bad Boy", to ensure that British fans had a reason to buy the new compilation album.

=== Stereo mixing ===
The LP was issued in both mono and stereo formats but since some of the songs had never been mixed for stereo – principally Beatles singles, which were released in mono until 1969 – a series of remix sessions were set up. None were attended by as much as a solitary Beatle.

— Beatles historian Mark Lewisohn

Several tracks, including "I Want to Hold Your Hand", "Day Tripper", "We Can Work It Out" and "Paperback Writer", were remixed in stereo for the album, since the majority of the Beatles' singles had only been mixed for mono release previously. The stereo mixing was overseen by George Martin, the Beatles' producer, with none of the band members present. The mixing sessions took place between 31 October and 10 November 1966 at EMI Studios (later Abbey Road Studios) in London.

Martin was surprised at how time-consuming the remixing of "She Loves You" and "I Want to Hold Your Hand" proved to be. In the case of "She Loves You", the 1963 two-track recording tape had since been reused, forcing EMI engineer Geoff Emerick to return to the mono master and create a "mock stereo" mix. This was achieved by removing the high frequencies from the left channel and the low frequencies from the right. They had also intended to remix "From Me to You", the Beatles' first song to top the Record Retailer chart, but this did not take place. (Note: Writing in 1988, Beatles historian Mark Lewisohn said that, with a 14 March 1963 stereo mix having been "scrapped", "From Me to You" appeared on A Collection of Beatles Oldies as "simply the original two-track tape, rhythm on the left channel, vocals on the right". According to author John Winn, however, the March 1963 stereo mix was used on the album, having originally appeared on the German compilation The Beatles Greatest in 1965.)

The final day of the album's preparation was carried out without Martin and Emerick. Author Kenneth Womack writes of their absence, as of the Beatles' non-participation: "Clearly, A Collection of Beatles Oldies was the sole priority of EMI at this juncture." Two other EMI engineers, Peter Bown and Graham Kirkby, remixed "Day Tripper" and "We Can Work It Out" that day. They then worked on "This Boy", the B-side of "I Want to Hold Your Hand", but this was due to a miscommunication with EMI's office in Manchester Square, where the song had been confused with "Bad Boy". The error was discovered later, by which point there was no time to remix "Bad Boy" and the original mix was used for the compilation.

== Artwork ==
The album cover is a painting by artist David Christian, who captured the vibrant colours then popular in London's Carnaby Street fashion boutiques. In the description of music journalist Martin O'Gorman, the cover image partly reflects the popularity of retro boutiques such as I Was Lord Kitchener's Valet; it also includes a man with a mop-top haircut reclining on a chair and "clad in Day-Glo striped trousers and a garishly patterned tie". O'Gorman adds that, except for the moustaches that the four Beatles had recently grown, the artist had captured the band's new psychedelic image, which would be unveiled in the film clips for the two songs on their next single, "Strawberry Fields Forever" and "Penny Lane". (Note: One of the inspirations behind the title track of Sgt. Pepper was the Victorian and Edwardian military attire available in Chelsea boutiques such as Lord Kitchener's Valet and Granny Takes a Trip. The latter, which also focused on psychedelic, Indian and Art Nouveau designs, had become a favourite of the Beatles during the Revolver period.) According to a report in the 3 December issue of Billboard magazine, the painting was a "colorful Op-Art" work that had been commissioned by Epstein.

The Robert Whitaker photograph used on the back of the LP cover. The photo later provided clues in the "Paul is dead" urban myth, as well as the inspiration for the cover of Oasis' 1994 album Definitely Maybe.

The back of the LP sleeve featured a photograph of the group taken by Robert Whitaker. The photo was taken in the Tokyo Hilton, where the band members were confined for much of their 1966 concert tour of Japan due to security concerns. Author Colin Larkin comments that, in comparison with their look as live performers, their "image as pin-up pop stars was also undergoing a metamorphosis" by late 1966. The Beatles are shown inspecting objets d'art that the Japanese promoter had arranged to have brought to the group's hotel suite, on 1 and 2 July, to help fill the time before their shows at the Budokan Hall.

The LP cover was one of several references to the Beatles that the English band Oasis incorporated into the artwork for their albums and singles from 1994 onwards, at a time when the Britpop movement drew heavily on the visual style of the Beatles' Revolver period. The image of the Beatles in the Tokyo hotel room served as inspiration for the photograph used on Oasis' debut album, Definitely Maybe, taken by Michael Spencer Jones.

=== "Paul is dead" interpretation ===
From Revolver onwards, the Beatles' more dedicated fans began analysing the band's song lyrics for hidden meaning, and, in the description of American academic Camille Paglia, their album covers were also "feverishly scrutinized for clues and coded messages". The cover of A Collection of Beatles Oldies was viewed as the first example of the Beatles leaving clues relating to the "Paul is dead" hoax. This theory, which escalated in late 1969, contended that Paul McCartney had been decapitated in a car crash in November 1966 and replaced in the band by a lookalike – a subterfuge that was facilitated by their retirement from live performance and change of image for Sgt. Pepper. (Note: In the coda to "Strawberry Fields Forever", recorded on 8 December, Lennon's spoken comment "Cranberry sauce" was heard as "I buried Paul.") Proponents of the theory noted that four figures were pictured around a car in the top left corner of the painting, and that another car appeared to be heading straight towards the head of the man reclining in the chair, who supposedly looked most like McCartney out of all the Beatles. In addition, if the first two letters of the word printed on the bass drum, "OLDIES", are each advanced alphabetically, the word becomes a message stating "PM [for Paul McCartney] dies". (Note: Writing in his 2008 book The Lennon Prophecy, Joseph Niezgoda says that the alleged clues in fact foretell of John Lennon's murder in December 1980. He identifies the folded right leg of the seated man as representing the letter J, which, together with the capitalised text on the bass drum, produces "JOLDIES". Given that Lennon changed his middle name to Ono in 1968, Niezgoda continues, the cover warns that "J.O.L. dies".)

The back-cover photo is also cited as evidence in the "Paul is dead" hoax, because of McCartney's atypical black attire, his distance from Lennon, Ringo Starr and George Harrison, and the appearance of smoke around him. This clue represents ectoplasm, suggesting, in the description of author Nicholas Kollerstrom, that McCartney's presence is merely an "apparition".

== Release ==
EMI's Parlophone label released A Collection of Beatles Oldies on 9 December 1966. With speculation continuing to surround the Beatles' future, Independent Television News (ITN) filmed its Reporting '66 segment outside EMI Studios on 20 December; each of the band members was interviewed on arrival and assured ITN's reporter that they were not going to break up. Otherwise, the only television appearance that month by a member of the Beatles was when Lennon appeared in the Not Only... But Also Christmas special. (Note: Lennon acted in a sketch titled "The Pipesucker Report", which satirised the American media's coverage of the Swinging London phenomenon. He played a doorman at the Ad-Lav, a parody of the exclusive Ad Lib nightclub in Soho.) On Record Retailer's LPs chart (later the UK Albums Chart), where all of the group's previous albums had held the top position for a minimum of seven weeks, the compilation reached number 7. On the national chart published by Melody Maker, it peaked at number 4.

At this time, the Beatles came second in the World Vocal Group category in the NME's annual readers poll, finishing with 5221 votes to the Beach Boys' 5321 – marking the only year between 1963 and 1969 that the Beatles failed to win in that category. Reports in Billboard and KRLA Beat attributed this result partly to the lack of new music from the band, and the fact that they had not toured the UK in 1966. (Note: The Beatles comfortably won in the best British Vocal Group category, but in Bravo magazine's readers poll, they lost to Dave Dee, Dozy, Beaky, Mick & Tich.) According to author Jonathan Gould, Epstein's concern was the Monkees, whose rise influenced his decision to cede to EMI's demands and release "Strawberry Fields Forever" and "Penny Lane" as a single in February 1967.

According to Official Charts Company researcher Sharon Mawer, EMI had been expecting to achieve the "biggest album" of the year with the first compilation of the Beatles' greatest hits, but A Collection of Beatles Oldies proved to be "one of the biggest miscalculations of the pop charts". She concluded that fans were unwilling to pay for an LP that, aside from "Bad Boy", repackaged recordings they already owned and "The era of the successful Greatest Hits compilation was not yet with us." The album was released in Australia in 1968, after EMI's regional office had issued two greatest hits sets exclusive to the local market, in late 1966 and early 1967. There, the retrospectively compiled Kent Music Report recorded a chart peak for A Collection of Beatles Oldies of number 7. The album returned to the UK chart on several occasions in the early 1970s, including placing at number 32 in April 1970 and number 38 in July 1972.

It was also released by Marks and Spencer's St. Michael label as Their Greatest Hits (catalogue number 1361/5701).

== Critical reception ==
Professional ratings
Review scores
| Source | Rating |
|---|---|
| AllMusic | 3/5 stars |
| Encyclopedia of Popular Music | 4/5 stars |

Among contemporary reviews, Tracks commented that the album "ought to give some indication of how the Beatles have developed, but it proves mainly how much more variety there is in their albums than in their singles". Record Mirror's reviewer criticised the omission of "Please Please Me" and considered "Bad Boy" "probably the worst on the album". The writer said that the album would only appeal to "the occasional Beatle buyers", but added, "doubtless there are enough of them to make this into a chart-topper."

Writing in the 1970s, NME critics Roy Carr and Tony Tyler said of the compilation: "Once again, it was Christmas – and the Beatles had no new product to give to EMI for their Santa sack! As a last resort, a predictable collection of oldies was hastily assembled and crammed into an inferior Carnaby-Street-style carrier-bag sleeve." They also commented on the record company's propensity, starting in 1963, for releasing the Beatles' hits and other previously issued songs on EPs – an approach they describe as an "Old Ukrainian saying: if it moves, sell it". Author Robert Rodriguez criticises EMI's commercial motivation, adding: "It must have been obvious to anyone paying attention that, given the low-rent design and their own oft-stated aversion to compilations, the Beatles had nothing to do with this project."

Writing for Rough Guides, Chris Ingham describes it as a "fair, if safe, mid-career compendium". In his review for AllMusic, Richard Ginell says that EMI did give fans value for their money, by offering sixteen songs instead of the usual quota of fourteen for a British LP release, one of which was the previously unissued track. Ginell writes that, in retrospect, the compilation stands as "a decent summing up of the Beatles' achievement just before the plunge into 'Strawberry Fields' and Sgt. Pepper".

According to a December 1971 report in Billboard on the preference for UK-pressed LPs among Los Angeles record-buyers, A Collection of Beatles Oldies was one of the most popular imported titles, and recognised as good value for its generous number of songs relative to the US industry standard. For many years after its release, the 1966 compilation remained the only British album to contain the Beatles' version of "Bad Boy". Although briefly available on the Music for Pleasure budget label, it was superseded by subsequent compilations: the band's 1962–1966 greatest hits set, released in 1973, contained fifteen of the songs; the remaining track, "Bad Boy", was then included on the 1976 compilation Rock 'n' Roll Music. A Collection of Beatles Oldies was deleted from the Beatles' catalogue following the reissue of their albums on compact disc in 1987. (Note: "Bad Boy" and the non-album singles were then collated on the two Past Masters volumes.)

== Track listing ==
All songs written by John Lennon and Paul McCartney except "Bad Boy" by Larry Williams.

Side one
| No. | Title | Lead singer(s) (Note: Lead vocalist credits are per Harry Castleman and Walter Podrazik's 1976 book All Together Now.) | Length |
|---|---|---|---|
| 1. | "She Loves You" | Lennon and McCartney | 2:19 |
| 2. | "From Me to You" | Lennon and McCartney | 1:54 |
| 3. | "We Can Work It Out" | McCartney, with Lennon | 2:11 |
| 4. | "Help!" | Lennon | 2:18 |
| 5. | "Michelle" | McCartney | 2:40 |
| 6. | "Yesterday" | McCartney | 2:03 |
| 7. | "I Feel Fine" | Lennon | 2:21 |
| 8. | "Yellow Submarine" | Ringo Starr | 2:36 |
| Total length: | | | 18:22 |

Side two
| No. | Title | Lead singer(s) | Length |
|---|---|---|---|
| 1. | "Can't Buy Me Love" | McCartney | 2:08 |
| 2. | "Bad Boy" | Lennon | 2:18 |
| 3. | "Day Tripper" | Lennon and McCartney | 2:49 |
| 4. | "A Hard Day's Night" | Lennon, with McCartney | 2:31 |
| 5. | "Ticket to Ride" | Lennon | 3:01 |
| 6. | "Paperback Writer" | McCartney | 2:15 |
| 7. | "Eleanor Rigby" | McCartney | 2:02 |
| 8. | "I Want to Hold Your Hand" | Lennon and McCartney | 2:26 |
| Total length: | | | 19:30 |

== Charts ==
1966–1968 weekly chart performance
| Chart | Position |
|---|---|
| Australian Kent Music Report | 7 |
| Norwegian VG-lista Albums | 12 |
| UK Disc and Music Echo Top Ten LPs | 4 |
| UK Melody Maker Top Ten LPs | 4 |
| UK NME Top 15 LPs | 6 |
| UK Record Retailer LPs Chart | 7 |

== Sources ==
- Bagirov, Alex (2008). The Anthology of the Beatles Records. Rostock: Something Books. ISBN 978-3-936300-44-4.
- Barrow, Tony (2005). John, Paul, George, Ringo & Me: The Real Beatles Story. New York, NY: Thunder's Mouth Press. ISBN 1-56025-882-9.
- The Beatles (2000). The Beatles Anthology. San Francisco, CA: Chronicle Books. ISBN 0-8118-2684-8.
- Brown, Peter; Gaines, Steven (2002) [1983]. The Love You Make: An Insider's Story of the Beatles. New York, NY: New American Library. ISBN 978-0-4512-0735-7.
- Carr, Roy; Tyler, Tony (1978). The Beatles: An Illustrated Record. London: Trewin Copplestone Publishing. ISBN 0-450-04170-0.
- Castleman, Harry; Podrazik, Walter J. (1976). All Together Now: The First Complete Beatles Discography 1961–1975. New York, NY: Ballantine Books. ISBN 0-345-25680-8.
- Clayson, Alan (2003). John Lennon. London: Sanctuary. ISBN 1-86074-487-7.
- Everett, Walter (1999). The Beatles as Musicians: Revolver Through the Anthology. New York, NY: Oxford University Press. ISBN 0-19-512941-5.
- Gould, Jonathan (2007). Can't Buy Me Love: The Beatles, Britain and America. London: Piatkus. ISBN 978-0-7499-2988-6.
- Hepworth, David (2016). Never a Dull Moment: 1971 The Year That Rock Exploded. New York, NY: Henry Holt and Company. ISBN 978-1-62779-400-8.
- Ingham, Chris (2006). The Rough Guide to the Beatles (2nd edn). London: Rough Guides/Penguin. ISBN 978-1-84836-525-4.
- Julien, Oliver, ed. (2008). Sgt. Pepper and the Beatles: It Was Forty Years Ago Today. Aldershot, UK: Ashgate. ISBN 978-0-7546-6708-7.
- Kollerstrom, Nicholas (2015). The Life and Death of Paul McCartney 1942–1966. Duluth, MN: Moon Rocks Books. ISBN 978-1-517283131.
- Larkin, Colin, ed. (2006). The Encyclopedia of Popular Music (4th edn). London: Oxford University Press. ISBN 978-0-19-531373-4.
- Lewisohn, Mark (2005) [1988]. The Complete Beatles Recording Sessions: The Official Story of the Abbey Road Years 1962–1970. London: Bounty Books. ISBN 978-0-7537-2545-0.
- MacDonald, Ian (1998). Revolution in the Head: The Beatles' Records and the Sixties. London: Pimlico. ISBN 978-0-7126-6697-8.
- Miles, Barry (2001). The Beatles Diary Volume 1: The Beatles Years. London: Omnibus Press. ISBN 0-7119-8308-9.
- Mojo Special Limited Edition: 1000 Days That Shook the World (The Psychedelic Beatles – April 1, 1965 to December 26, 1967). London: Emap. 2002.
- Niezgoda, Joseph (2008). The Lennon Prophecy: A New Examination of the Death Clues of the Beatles. Chicago, IL: New Chapter Press. ISBN 978-0-942257458.
- Norman, Philip (1996) [1981]. Shout!: The Beatles in Their Generation. New York, NY: Fireside. ISBN 0-684-83067-1.
- Patterson, R. Gary (1998). The Walrus Was Paul: The Great Beatle Death Clues. New York, NY: Fireside. ISBN 0-684-85062-1.
- Rodriguez, Robert (2012). Revolver: How the Beatles Reimagined Rock 'n' Roll. Milwaukee, WI: Backbeat Books. ISBN 978-1-61713-009-0.
- Schaffner, Nicholas (1978). The Beatles Forever. New York, NY: McGraw-Hill. ISBN 0-07-055087-5.
- Spitz, Bob (2005). The Beatles: The Biography. New York, NY: Little, Brown. ISBN 1-84513-160-6.
- Turner, Steve (2016). Beatles '66: The Revolutionary Year. New York, NY: HarperLuxe. ISBN 978-0-06-249713-0.
- Winn, John C. (2008). Way Beyond Compare: The Beatles' Recorded Legacy, Volume One, 1962–1965. New York, NY: Three Rivers Press. ISBN 978-0-3074-5239-9.
- Winn, John C. (2009). That Magic Feeling: The Beatles' Recorded Legacy, Volume Two, 1966–1970. New York, NY: Three Rivers Press. ISBN 978-0-307-45239-9.
- Womack, Kenneth (2014). The Beatles Encyclopedia: Everything Fab Four. Santa Barbara, CA: ABC-CLIO. ISBN 978-0-313-39171-2.
- Womack, Kenneth (2018). Sound Pictures: The Life of Beatles Producer George Martin – The Later Years, 1966–2016. Chicago, IL: Chicago Review Press. ISBN 978-0-912777-74-0.
