= You Know My Name (Look Up the Number) =

1970 single by the Beatles

- 2011 US picture sleeve

Single by the Beatles
- A-side: "Let It Be"
- Released: 6 March 1970
- Recorded: 17 May, 7 and 8 June 1967; 30 April 1969
- Studio: EMI, London
- Genre: Music hall; novelty
- Length: 4:21 (mono version); 5:44 (stereo version)
- Label: Apple
- Songwriter: Lennon–McCartney
- Producer: George Martin

The Beatles UK singles chronology
"Something" / "Come Together" (1969)	"Let It Be" / "You Know My Name (Look Up the Number)" (1970)	"Yesterday" (1976)

The Beatles US singles chronology
"Something" / "Come Together" (1969)	"Let It Be" / "You Know My Name (Look Up the Number)" (1970)	"The Long and Winding Road" (1970)

"You Know My Name (Look Up the Number)" is a song by the English rock band the Beatles released initially as the B-side of the single "Let It Be" on 6 March 1970. Although first issued with their final single (and the penultimate single in the United States), the Beatles recorded the song in four separate sessions, beginning with three in May and June 1967, during the sessions for Magical Mystery Tour, with one final recording session conducted in April 1969 during the sessions for Abbey Road. The song features a saxophone part played by Brian Jones of the Rolling Stones.

== Composition ==
The song is a music hall comedy number with elements of a Latin style that resembles mambo. John Lennon came up with the lyric/title after seeing a phone book. He said:

That was a piece of unfinished music that I turned into a comedy record with Paul. I was waiting for him in his house, and I saw the phone book was on the piano with 'You know the name, look up the number.' That was like a logo, and I just changed it.

McCartney once told Beatles recording analyst Mark Lewisohn, "[People] are only just discovering things like 'You Know My Name (Look Up the Number)'—probably my favourite Beatles' track!" He went on to explain:

...it's so insane. All the memories ... I mean, what would you do if a guy like John Lennon turned up at the studio and said, 'I've got a new song'. I said, 'What's the words?' and he replied 'You know my name look up the number'. I asked, 'What's the rest of it?' 'No, no other words, those are the words. And I want to do it like a mantra!'

The lounge section includes a reference to Denis O'Dell, associate producer on the A Hard Day's Night film, whom Lennon had also worked with on How I Won the War. Partway through the song, Lennon introduces McCartney as "Denis O'Bell". The reference prompted numerous telephone calls to O'Dell's home by fans who said things such as, "We know your name and now we've got your number."

== Musical structure ==
The song is in the key of D. The "You know" involves F♯–D♯ melody notes against a I (D chord). A point of interest is the raised A melody note against a D/F♯ chord on "name", "three" and "name". A significant moment is the Tonicization of the dominant with the use of vii^{o}^{7}/V chord (G♯dim) as part of the progression to V^{7} (A^{7} chord on "You know my name") and I (D chord after "number") that closes the verse. The song is also notable for the use of the 5th chord tone on the VII chord to produce extra dissonance.

== Recording ==
All four Beatles participated in the first three recording sessions on 17 May, 7 June and 8 June 1967. A saxophone part, played by Brian Jones of the Rolling Stones, was recorded on 8 June.

The recording of the song was left unfinished and untouched until 30 April 1969 when, with the help of Mal Evans, Lennon and McCartney laid down all the vocal tracks and added additional sound effects. George Harrison and Ringo Starr did not participate in this last session. Nick Webb, second engineer on 30 April session, described it this way:

John and Paul weren't always getting along that well at this time, but for this song they went out on the studio floor and sang together around one microphone. Even at this time I was thinking 'What are they doing with this old four-track tape, recording these funny bits onto this quaint song?' But it was a fun track to do.

== Release ==
Although eventually released as a Beatles song, "You Know My Name (Look Up the Number)" was nearly issued as the A-side of a Plastic Ono Band single. Lennon was determined to have this song and "What's the New Mary Jane" (a Beatles outtake from The Beatles sessions recorded by Lennon and Yoko Ono with Harrison in August 1968) released. He arranged for Apple to issue both songs on a Plastic Ono Band single. On 26 November 1969, four months after contributor Brian Jones drowned in his swimming pool, Lennon edited "You Know My Name (Look Up the Number)", reducing the length from 6:08 to 4:19, a more suitable time for a single. The Plastic Ono Band single was given an Apple catalogue number (Apples 1002) and British release date (5 December 1969). In January 1970, Apple issued a press statement, describing the record as Lennon and Ono singing and backed by "many of the greatest show business names of today" which the press believed was a thinly disguised reference to the Beatles. The record was cancelled before it was issued.

In March 1970, the song was released as the B-side to the Beatles' single, "Let It Be", but mistitled as "You Know My Name (Look Up My Number)" on the label of the record itself (the correct title appeared on the record sleeve, however). The original Plastic Ono Band single catalogue number is visible, though scratched out, in the runout groove of the original British pressings of the "Let It Be" single. "What's the New Mary Jane" was not officially issued by the Beatles until the release of Anthology 3 in 1996. However, the song previously appeared on several bootleg records.

"You Know My Name (Look Up the Number)" was the last Beatles song from the group's official canon to be included on an album, issued on an LP for the first time on Rarities (which had been included as a bonus disc in the British and American boxed set, The Beatles Collection in 1978, and released separately as an album in the United Kingdom in 1979). The first American album to contain "You Know My Name (Look Up the Number)" was the US version of Rarities, which was issued by Capitol Records in 1980. The first CD version was issued in 1988 on the Past Masters, Volume Two compilation.

The record was available only in mono until 1996 when an extended stereo mix was finally issued with the release of Anthology 2. However, while this mix restores portions of the song, it omits others that were issued on the original mono single, causing considerable differences between the mono and stereo versions of the track. For example, the ending of the stereo version has an early fade out, whereas the mono version does not fade.

== In popular culture ==
The song is a favourite of musician Black Francis, lead singer of Pixies. Since 2017, the band often plays a recording of the song as they take the stage for a performance.

== Personnel ==
Personnel per Ian MacDonald and Mark Lewisohn, except where noted.

The Beatles

- John Lennon – lead vocals, backing vocals, spoken vocals, guitar, maracas, sound effects
- Paul McCartney – lead vocals, piano, bass, handclaps, sound effects
- George Harrison – lead guitar, vibraphone
- Ringo Starr – drums, timbales, bongos

Additional musicians

- Brian Jones – alto saxophone
- Mal Evans – sound effects (spade in gravel)
