= Camillo Felgen =

Luxembourgish singer-songwriter (1920-2005)

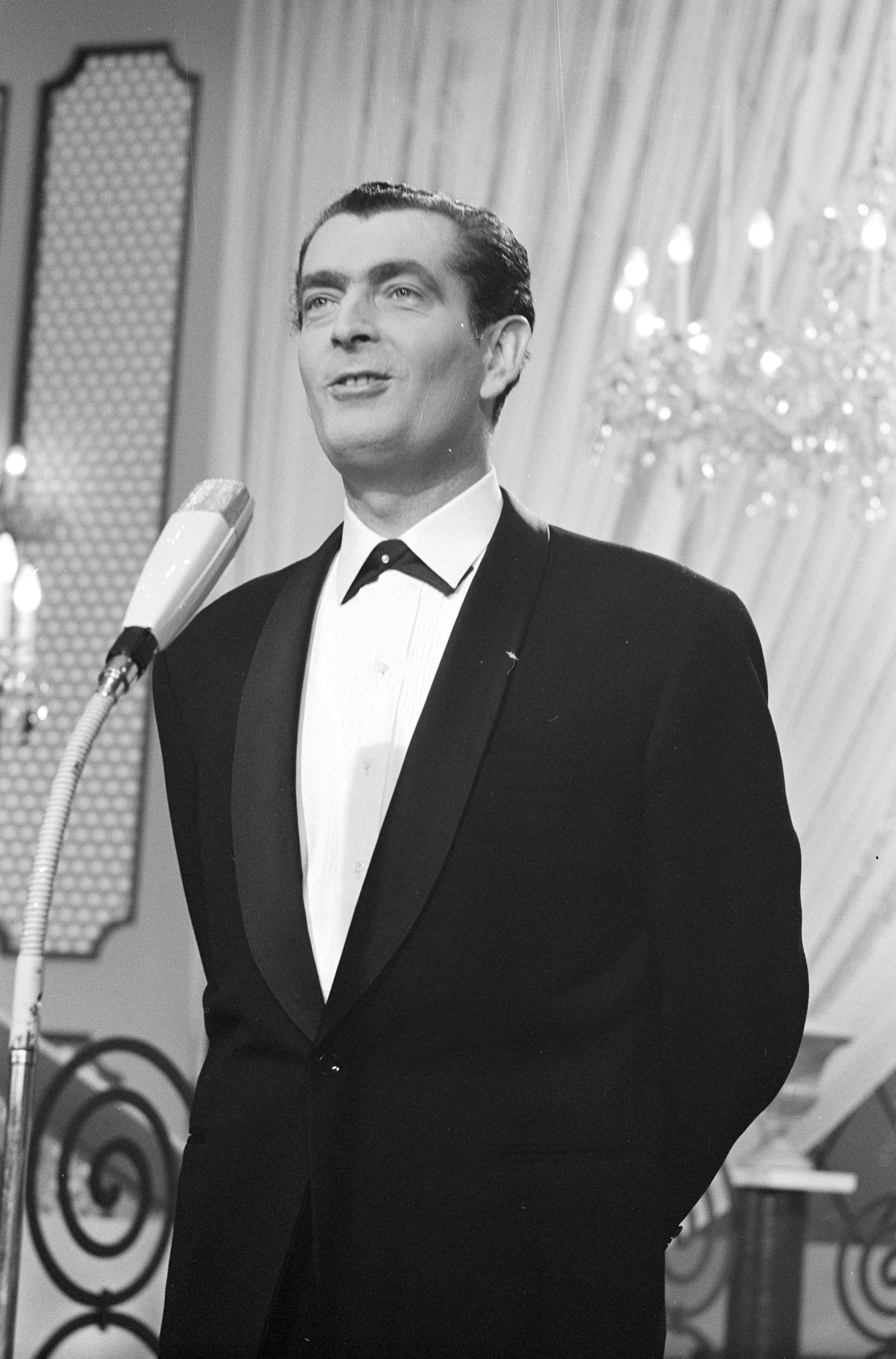
- Born: Camillo Jean Nicolas Felgen; November 17, 1920; Tétange, Luxembourg
- Died: 16 July 2005 (aged 84); Esch-sur-Alzette, Luxembourg
- Occupations: Singer, songwriter
- Years active: 1946-2005
- Musical career
- Genres: Schlager
- Instrument: vocals
- Label: Electrola

Camillo Jean Nicolas Felgen (17 November 1920 – 16 July 2005) was a Luxembourgish singer, lyricist, disc jockey, and television presenter, who represented Luxembourg in the Eurovision Song Contest 1960 and in 1962.

== Biography ==
Felgen started his career as a teacher, then he was a translator for the occupying troops and a reporter for a French-language newspaper. He studied theater and opera in Brussels and Liège; in 1946, he joined Radio Luxembourg as a chorus singer and a French-language reporter. In 1949, the mastering of his baritone completed his theatre and opera studies. In 1951, he had his first international hit record, "Bonjour les amies" ("Hello Friends"). The song went on to become the theme song for his national broadcaster. In 1953, he recorded his first German-language record, "Onkel Toms altes Boot" ("Uncle Tom's Old Boat"), in Berlin. He represented his home country in the Eurovision Song Contest 1960 with "So laang we's du do bast", becoming the first Luxembourger and the first male contestant to represent Luxembourg and the first participant to sing in Luxembourgish. He finished last with only one point. Two years later he entered the contest again, this time doing much better by finishing in 3rd place with the song "Petit bonhomme". He did at times do the commentary in German, too.

One of Felgen's greatest hits was "Ich hab Ehrfurcht vor schneeweißen Haaren" ("I Respect Your Grey Hair"), a cover of singer-guitarist and entrepreneur Bobbejaan Schoepen. Another was "Sag warum", in 1959, based on a melody by Phil Spector.

Camillo Felgen also wrote German lyrics for cover versions of international songs, using the pseudonym Jean Nicolas, writing for Connie Francis, Caterina Valente, Greetje Kauffeld and Lill-Babs, among others. It is sometimes incorrectly stated that he also used the name "Lee Montague", but that was the pen-name of Lawrence “Larry” M. Yaskiel, a Londoner who worked as a Sunday-school teacher and encyclopedia salesman, before becoming involved in pop music in Germany in the 1960s, working first for Deutsche Vogue, then for various production companies, and for A&M Records, before retiring to the Canary Islands.

In 1964, as Jean Nicolas, Felgen also translated the only two songs recorded by the Beatles in German: "Komm, gib mir deine Hand" ("I Want to Hold Your Hand") and "Sie liebt dich" ("She Loves You"). Felgen, then working as a programme director at Radio Luxembourg, was given just 24 hours to finalize the translated lyrics, fly to Paris, and coach the band on German phonetics.

From 1965 until 1973, Felgen was the host and commentator for the German broadcasts of Jeux sans frontières (Spiel Ohne Grenzen)

== Death ==
He died in Esch-sur-Alzette on 16 July 2005, at the age of 84.

== Footnotes ==
- Camillo Felgen at IMDb

Preceded by Jean-Claude Pascal	Luxembourg in the Eurovision Song Contest; 1962	Succeeded by Nana Mouskouri
Preceded by Solange Berry	Luxembourg in the Eurovision Song Contest; 1960	Succeeded by Jean-Claude Pascal
