= Thank You Girl =

- US picture sleeve

Single by the Beatles
- A-side: "From Me to You" (UK & US 1st release); "Do You Want to Know a Secret (US 2nd release)
- Released: 11 April 1963 (UK); 27 May 1963 (US)
- Recorded: 5 & 13 March 1963
- Studio: EMI, London
- Genre: Merseybeat
- Length: 2:01
- Label: Parlophone (UK); Vee-Jay (US)
- Songwriter: Lennon–McCartney
- Producer: George Martin

The Beatles singles chronology
"Please Please Me" (1963)	"From Me to You" / "Thank You Girl" (1963)	"She Loves You" (1963)

"Thank You Girl" is a song recorded by the English rock band the Beatles, written by John Lennon and Paul McCartney. It was issued as the B-side of the single "From Me to You", which was recorded on the same day (5 March 1963). While not released on an LP in the United Kingdom until Rarities in 1978, the song was the second track on The Beatles' Second Album in the United States. As the B-side of the single "Do You Want to Know a Secret", it hit No. 35 on the Billboard Hot 100 in the spring of 1964.

== Background ==
Originally titled "Thank You, Little Girl", the song was written by John Lennon and Paul McCartney as a tribute to the band's many female fans. McCartney said, "We knew that if we wrote a song called, 'Thank You Girl', that a lot of the girls who wrote us fan letters would take it as a genuine 'thank you'. So a lot of our songs were directly addressed to the fans." Written “eyeball to eyeball", a phrase Lennon and McCartney would later use to describe their early formulaic writing sessions, "Thank You Girl" demonstrates how they were able to produce a song from scratch by working in total partnership. Lyrically, Ian MacDonald suggests that Lennon probably wrote the first line of each verse, allowing McCartney to use his flair for word play and inner-rhyming in completing it.

Lennon said the song was originally intended as a single: "'Thank You Girl' was one of our efforts at writing a single that didn't work. So it became a B-side or an album track." In April 1972, he told Hit Parader, "[The song was written by] Paul and me. This was just a silly song we knocked off." McCartney seemed to agree describing it as "a bit of a hack song, but all good practice."

Both "From Me to You" and "Thank You Girl" were credited to "McCartney–Lennon", as were eight of the songs on the Please Please Me album. It would be permanently changed to the more familiar "Lennon–McCartney" songwriting credit for their next single release, "She Loves You".

== Recording ==
The song was recorded in thirteen takes, the same number of takes needed to perfect "From Me To You", on 5 March 1963. This recording session is also notable because it marks the first studio appearances of two Lennon–McCartney songs that would not be released until much later in the band's career: "One After 909" (later re-recorded, appearing on Let It Be) and "What Goes On" (later re-recorded, appearing on Rubber Soul, credited as Lennon–McCartney/Starkey to reflect Ringo's contribution to the lyrics). Although both songs were rehearsed, only "One After 909" was recorded, and even then the results were deemed unsatisfactory for release.

John Lennon overdubbed the harmonica without the other Beatles eight days later. According to multiple sources, John came to the session directly from bed due to a severe cold. Engineer Geoff Emerick said it took John numerous takes to produce a satisfactory result because he was so unsteady.

The stereo mix of the song (included on the Capitol LP The Beatles' Second Album) is noticeably different from the original single mono mix (re-released on CD in 1988 on the compilation Past Masters, Volume One) in the middle 8. In the stereo version, a couple of extra harmonica lines can be heard, as well as at the very end of the song. In addition, this stereo mix contained reverb added by Capitol, especially noticeable in Lennon's final chorus. The unadulterated stereo mix was released for the first time on the 2009 remastered CD Past Masters.

== Cover versions ==
The song was covered by the Smithereens on their 2008 album B-Sides The Beatles.

== Personnel ==
- John Lennon – double-tracked vocal, rhythm guitar, harmonica
- Paul McCartney – harmony vocal, bass guitar
- George Harrison – lead guitar
- Ringo Starr – drums

Personnel per Ian MacDonald

== Charts ==
Chart performance for "Thank You Girl"
Chart (1964)	Peak position
US Billboard Hot 100	35
