= No One's Gonna Change Our World =

1969 charity album for the World Wildlife Fund

Compilation album by Various artists
- Released: 12 December 1969
- Label: Regal Starline

No One's Gonna Change Our World is a charity album released in the United Kingdom on 12 December 1969 for the benefit of the World Wildlife Fund.

The compilation, assembled by comedian Spike Milligan, includes two tracks from Milligan and one from his Goon Show castmate Harry Secombe, and features liner notes by Prince Philip, Duke of Edinburgh. It is widely known by fans of the Beatles as the first release of the song "Across the Universe"; its title is adapted from one of the song's lyrics; "Nothing's gonna change my world". It was also the first release of the Hollies song "Wings", one of the last songs they recorded with Graham Nash in early 1968.

The album was released on Regal Starline as catalogue number SRS 5013.

== Track listing ==
1. The Beatles – "Across the Universe" [3:49]
2. Cilla Black – "What the World Needs Now Is Love" [3:05]
3. Rolf Harris – "Cuddly Old Koala"
4. The Hollies – "Wings" [2:57]
5. Spike Milligan – "Ning Nang Nong" [2:49]
6. Spike Milligan – "The Python" [1:26]
7. Bee Gees – "Marley Purt Drive" [4:26]
8. Lulu – "I'm a Tiger" [2:45]
9. Dave Dee, Dozy, Beaky, Mick & Tich – "Bend It" [2:29]
10. Cliff Richard – "In the Country" [2:41]
11. Bruce Forsyth – "When I See an Elephant Fly"
12. Harry Secombe – "Land of My Fathers"
