= Bad Boy (Larry Williams song) =

Single by Larry Williams
- B-side: "She Said Yeah"
- Released: January 1959
- Recorded: August 14, 1958
- Studio: Radio Recorders, Hollywood, California
- Genre: R&B
- Length: 2:10
- Label: Specialty
- Songwriter: Larry Williams
- Producer: Art Rupe

Larry Williams singles chronology
"I Was a Fool" (1958)	"Bad Boy" (1959)	"Steal a Little Kiss" (1959)

"Bad Boy" is a song written and recorded by American R&B musician Larry Williams. Specialty Records released it as a single in 1958, but it failed to reach the U.S. Billboard charts. However, music journalist Stephen Thomas Erlewine calls it one of Williams's "genuine rock & roll classics" and notes its popularity among 1960s British Invasion groups, such as the Beatles.

== Original song ==
Williams was among the early rhythm and blues artists to adapt his style to the new rock and roll sound. The lyrics reflect a teenage sensibility: "He's a guy who causes trouble in the classroom, puts chewing gum in little girls' hair, and doesn't want to go to school to learn to read and write", according to critic Richie Unterberger. Musically, he calls it:

rather conventional if energetic early rock'n'roll, sounding like a more pop-oriented Little Richard, as Williams was wont to do. He made it more effective than a common generic early rock'n'roll tune, however, with some start-stop tempos, devious blues-rock guitar, spoken comic "he's a ... bad boy" interjections after lines in the verse, and exaggerated whoops and, most memorably, falsetto commands "Now Junior, behave yourself!".

Music writer Gene Sculatti compares it to Williams's earlier song "Dizzy, Miss Lizzy", but with backup vocals more like the Coasters "Charlie Brown" and the Everly Brothers "Bird Dog", both Billboard chart hits.

=== Personnel ===
The song was recorded at Radio Recorders in Hollywood, California, on August 14, 1958, by:

- Larry Williams – vocals, piano
- René Hall – guitar
- Ted Brinson – bass
- Earl Palmer – drums
- Jewell Grant – baritone sax
- Plas Johnson – tenor sax

== The Beatles version ==
"Bad Boy"
- Sheet music cover

Song by the Beatles

from the album Beatles VI
- Released: June 14, 1965 (US); December 10, 1966 (UK)
- Recorded: May 10, 1965
- Studio: EMI, London
- Genre: Rock and roll
- Length: 2:21
- Label: Capitol (US); Parlophone (UK)
- Songwriter: Larry Williams
- Producer: George Martin

"Bad Boy" is one of several Larry Williams songs the English rock band the Beatles recorded during their career. They recorded it on May 10, 1965 (Williams' birthday), along with Williams' "Dizzy, Miss Lizzy", and it was originally intended solely for release in North America. "Bad Boy" was first released on the American album Beatles VI in June 1965, while "Dizzy, Miss Lizzy" appeared on the British Help! album in August of that year. "Bad Boy" was eventually released in the UK on the compilation album A Collection of Beatles Oldies, in December 1966; it was later released worldwide on the 1988 compilation album Past Masters, Volume One, as well as its 2009 reissue, Past Masters, which combines both volumes.

The song was released as the title track of an EP in Sweden together with "Norwegian Wood (This Bird Has Flown)", "I'm Looking Through You" and "In My Life". This EP sold so well that "Bad Boy" reached numbers seven on the country's sales chart, Kvällstoppen and five on the radio chart Tio i Topp in December 1966.

=== Personnel ===
Personnel per Ian MacDonald

- John Lennon – vocal, rhythm guitar
- Paul McCartney – bass, electric piano
- George Harrison – double-tracked lead guitar
- Ringo Starr – drums, tambourine
