= I Want to Hold Your Hand =

1963 single by the Beatles

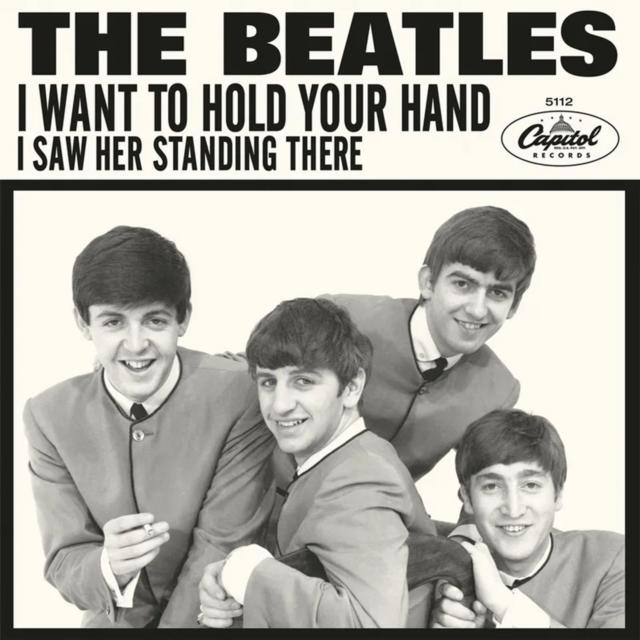
- US picture sleeve

Single by the Beatles
- B-side: "This Boy" (UK); "I Saw Her Standing There" (US)
- Released: 29 November 1963 (UK); 26 December 1963 (US)
- Recorded: 17 October 1963
- Studio: EMI, London
- Genre: Rock and roll, pop
- Length: 2:24
- Label: Parlophone (UK) · Capitol (US)
- Songwriter: Lennon–McCartney
- Producer: George Martin

The Beatles UK singles chronology
"She Loves You" (1963)	"I Want to Hold Your Hand" (1963)	"Can't Buy Me Love" (1964)

The Beatles US singles chronology
"She Loves You" (1963)	"I Want to Hold Your Hand" (1963)	"My Bonnie" (1964)

Licensed audio
- "I Want to Hold Your Hand" on YouTube

"I Want to Hold Your Hand" is a song by the English rock band the Beatles, written by John Lennon and Paul McCartney. Recorded on 17 October 1963 and released on 29 November 1963 in the United Kingdom, it was the first Beatles record to be made using four-track recording equipment.

With advance orders exceeding one million copies in the UK, "I Want to Hold Your Hand" would have gone straight to the top of the British record charts on its day of release had it not been blocked by the group's first million-seller "She Loves You", their previous UK single, which was having a resurgence of popularity following intense media coverage of the group. Taking two weeks to dislodge its predecessor, "I Want to Hold Your Hand" stayed at number one for five weeks and remained in the UK top 50 for 21 weeks in total, and was the Christmas number one of 1963.

It was also the group's first American number-one hit, entering the Billboard Hot 100 chart on 18 January 1964 at number 45 and starting the British Invasion of the American music industry. By 1 February, it topped the Hot 100 and stayed there for seven weeks before being replaced by "She Loves You". It remained on the Billboard chart for 15 weeks. "I Want to Hold Your Hand" became the Beatles' best-selling single worldwide, selling more than 12 million copies. In 2018, Billboard magazine named it the 48th biggest hit of all time on the Billboard Hot 100. In the UK, it was the second-highest-selling single of the 1960s, behind "She Loves You".

== Background and composition ==
Capitol Records' rejection of the group's recordings in the US was now Brian Epstein's primary concern, and he encouraged Lennon and McCartney to write a song to appeal specifically to the American market. George Martin, however, had no such explicit recollections, believing that Capitol was left with no alternative but to release "I Want to Hold Your Hand" due to increasing demand for the group's product.

McCartney had recently moved into 57 Wimpole Street, London, where he was lodging as a guest of Dr Richard and Margaret Asher, and whose daughter, actress Jane Asher, had become McCartney's girlfriend earlier in the year. This location briefly became Lennon and McCartney's new writing base, taking over from McCartney's Forthlin Road home in Liverpool. Margaret Asher taught the oboe in the "small, rather stuffy music room" in the basement where Lennon and McCartney sat at the piano and composed "I Want to Hold Your Hand". In September 1980, Lennon told Playboy magazine:

We wrote a lot of stuff together, one on one, eyeball to eyeball. Like in 'I Want to Hold Your Hand,' I remember when we got the chord that made the song. We were in Jane Asher's house, downstairs in the cellar playing on the piano at the same time. And we had, 'Oh you-u-u/ got that something ...' And Paul hits this chord and I turn to him and say, 'That's it!' I said, 'Do that again!' In those days, we really used to absolutely write like that—both playing into each other's noses.

In 1994, McCartney agreed with Lennon's description of the circumstances surrounding the composition of "I Want to Hold Your Hand", saying: "'Eyeball to eyeball' is a very good description of it. That's exactly how it was. 'I Want to Hold Your Hand' was very co-written." According to Ian MacDonald, in keeping with how Lennon and McCartney collaborated at that time, lyrically bland, random phrases were most likely called out by the pair; if the phrases fitted the overall sound, they would stay. The song's title was probably a variation of "I Wanna Be Your Man", which the Beatles had recently recorded at EMI Studios.

== Musical structure ==
"I Want to Hold Your Hand"

Reminiscent of Tin Pan Alley and Brill Building techniques and an example of modified 32-bar form, "I Want to Hold Your Hand" is written on a two-bridge model, with only an intervening verse to connect them. The song has no real "lead" singer, as Lennon and McCartney sing alternately in unison and in harmony.

The song is in the key of G major and lyrically opens two beats early with "Oh yeah, I'll tell you something" with a D-B, B-D melody note drop and rise over an I (G) chord. Controversy exists over the landmark chord that Lennon stated McCartney hit on the piano while they were composing the song. Wolf Marshall considers it to be the minor vi (Em) chord (the third chord in the I–V7–vi (G–D7–Em) progression). Walter Everett is of the same opinion. Dominic Pedler claims, however, that more surprising is the melody note drop from B to F♯ against a III7 (B7) chord on "understand".

== Recording ==
The Beatles recorded "I Want to Hold Your Hand" at EMI Studios in Studio 2 on 17 October 1963. This song, along with the single's B-side, "This Boy", was the first Beatles song to be recorded with four-track technology. The two songs were recorded on the same day, each needing seventeen takes. Mono and stereo mixing was done by George Martin on 21 October 1963; further stereo mixes were done on 8 June 1965, for compilations released by EMI affiliates in Australia and the Netherlands, and on 7 November 1966.

"I Want to Hold Your Hand" was one of two Beatles songs (along with "She Loves You" as "Sie liebt dich") to be later recorded in German, entitled "Komm, gib mir deine Hand" (literally "Come, give me your hand"). Both songs were translated by Luxembourger musician Camillo Felgen, under the pseudonym of "Jean Nicolas". Odeon, the German arm of EMI (the parent company of the Beatles' record label, Parlophone) was convinced that the Beatles' records would not sell in Germany unless they were sung in German. The Beatles detested the idea, and when they were due to record the German version on 27 January 1964 at EMI's Pathe Marconi Studios in Paris (where the Beatles were performing 18 days of concerts at the Olympia Theatre), they chose to boycott the session. Their record producer, George Martin, having waited some hours for them to show up, was outraged and insisted that they give it a try. Two days later, the Beatles recorded "Komm, gib mir deine Hand", one of the few times in their career that they recorded outside London. However, Martin later conceded: "They were right, actually, it wasn't necessary for them to record in German, but they weren't graceless, they did a good job".

"Komm, gib mir deine Hand" was released as a German single in March 1964. In July that year, the song appeared on the Capitol Records release Something New. It was also included on the 1988 compilation Past Masters.

== Promotion and release ==
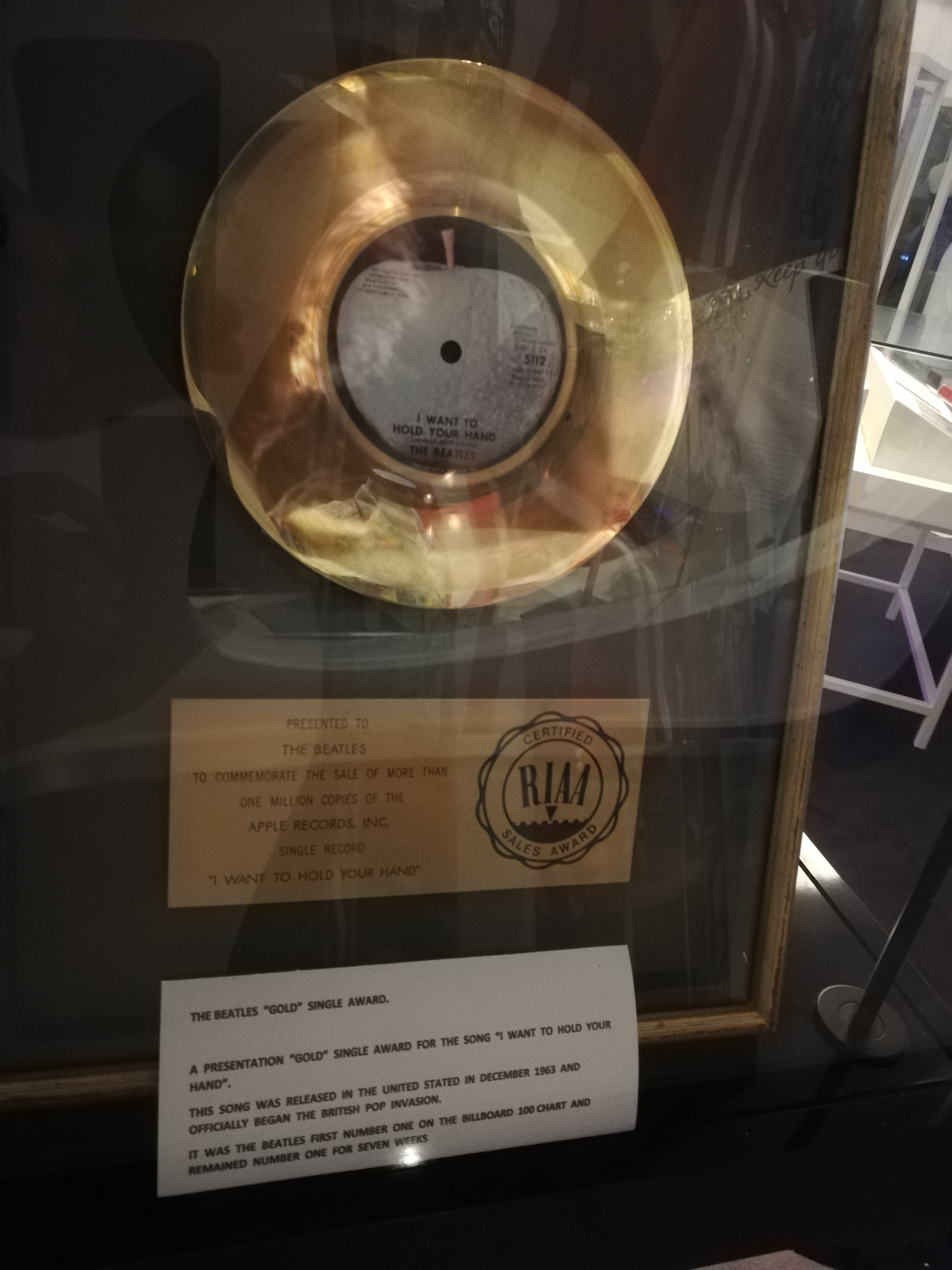
Gold record awarded to the Beatles by the RIAA to commemorate one million sales of "I Want to Hold Your Hand" (Museum of Style Icons, Ireland)

In the United Kingdom, "She Loves You" (released in August) shot back to the number-one position in November following blanket media coverage of the Beatles (described as Beatlemania). Mark Lewisohn later wrote: "'She Loves You' had already sold an industry-boggling three-quarters of a million before these fresh converts were pushing it into seven figures. And at this very moment, just four weeks before Christmas, with everyone connected to the music and relevant retail industries already lying prone in paroxysms of unimaginable delight, EMI pulled the trigger and released 'I Want to Hold Your Hand'. And then it was bloody pandemonium."

On 29 November 1963, Parlophone Records released "I Want to Hold Your Hand" in the UK, with "This Boy" as the single's B-side. Demand had been building for quite a while, as evidenced by the one million advance orders for the single. When it was finally released, the response was phenomenal. A week after it entered the British charts, on 14 December 1963, it knocked "She Loves You" off the top spot, the first instance of an act taking over from itself at number one in British history, and it clung to the top spot for five weeks, becoming the Christmas number one of 1963. It stayed in the charts for another 15 weeks and made a one-week return to the charts on 16 May 1964. Beatlemania was peaking at that time; during the same period, the Beatles set a record by occupying the top two positions on both the album and single charts in the UK.

EMI and Brian Epstein finally convinced American label Capitol Records, a subsidiary of EMI, that the Beatles could make an impact in the US, leading to the release of "I Want to Hold Your Hand" with "I Saw Her Standing There" on the B-side as a single on 26 December 1963. Capitol had previously resisted issuing Beatle recordings in the US. This resulted in the relatively modest Vee-Jay and Swan labels releasing the group's earlier Parlophone counterparts in the US. Seizing the opportunity, Epstein demanded US$40,000 from Capitol to promote the single (the most the Beatles had ever previously spent on an advertising campaign was US$5,000). The single had actually been intended for release in mid-January 1964, coinciding with the planned appearance of the Beatles on The Ed Sullivan Show. However, a fourteen-year-old fan of the Beatles, Marsha Albert, wanted to hear the Beatles on the radio earlier. Later she said:

It wasn't so much what I had seen, it's what I had heard. They had a scene where they played a clip of "She Loves You" and I thought it was a great song ... I wrote that I thought the Beatles would be really popular here, and if [deejay Carroll James] could get one of their records, that would really be great.

James was the DJ for WWDC, a radio station in Washington, DC. Eventually, he decided to pursue Albert's suggestion. He asked the station's promotion director to get British Overseas Airways Corporation to ship in a copy of "I Want to Hold Your Hand" from Britain. Albert related what happened next: "Carroll James called me up the day he got the record and said, 'If you can get down here by 5 o'clock, we'll let you introduce it.'" Albert managed to get to the station in time and introduced the record with: "Ladies and gentlemen, for the first time on the air in the United States, here are the Beatles singing 'I Want to Hold Your Hand'."

The song proved to be a huge hit, a surprise for the station since they catered mainly to a more staid audience, which would typically be expecting songs from singers such as Andy Williams or Bobby Vinton instead of rock and roll. James took to playing the song repeatedly on the station, often turning it down in the middle to make the declaration, "This is a Carroll James exclusive", to avoid theft of the song by other stations.

Capitol threatened to seek a court order banning airplay of "I Want to Hold Your Hand", which was already being spread by James to a couple of DJs in Chicago and St. Louis. James and WWDC ignored the threat, and Capitol concluded that they could take advantage of the publicity, releasing the single two weeks ahead of schedule on 26 December.

The demand was insatiable; in the first three days alone, a quarter of a million copies had already been sold (10,000 copies in New York City every hour). The demand so overloaded Capitol that it contracted part of the job of pressing copies off to Columbia Records and RCA. By 18 January, the song had started its 15-week chart run. On 1 February, the Beatles finally achieved their first number one on Billboard (replacing "There! I've Said It Again" by Bobby Vinton, emulating the success of another British group, the Tornados with "Telstar", which topped the Billboard chart for three weeks in December 1962. "I Want to Hold Your Hand" finally relinquished the number-one spot after seven weeks, succeeded by the song they had knocked off the top in Britain: "She Loves You". "I Want to Hold Your Hand" sold around five million copies in the US alone. The replacement of themselves at the top of the US charts was the first time since Elvis Presley in 1956, with "Love Me Tender" beating out "Don't Be Cruel", that an act had dropped off the top of the American charts only to be replaced by another of their releases. "I Want to Hold Your Hand" also finished as the number one song for 1964, according to Billboard. In 2013, Billboard listed it as the 44th most successful song of all-time on the Hot 100.

With that, the "British Invasion" of America had been launched. Throughout 1964, British pop and rock artists enjoyed unprecedented success on the American charts.

The American single's front and back sleeves featured a photograph of the Beatles with Paul McCartney holding a cigarette. In 1984, Capitol Records airbrushed out the cigarette for the re-release of the single.

"I Want to Hold Your Hand" was also released in America on the album Meet the Beatles!, which altered the American charts by actually outselling the single. Beforehand, the American markets favoured hit singles more than whole albums; however, two months after the album's release, it had shipped 3,650,000 copies, over 200,000 ahead of the "I Want to Hold Your Hand" single at 3,400,000.

The song was included on the 1964 Canadian release The Beatles' Long Tall Sally. The November 1966 stereo remix appeared on 1966's A Collection of Beatles Oldies, and on several later Beatles compilation albums, including 1973's 1962–1966, 1982's 20 Greatest Hits, and 2000's 1. The 2009 CD rerelease of the Beatles' catalogue included the 1966 stereo remix on Past Masters and the original mono mix on Mono Masters.

== Reception and legacy ==
The song was greeted by raving fans on both sides of the Atlantic but was dismissed by some critics as nothing more than another fad song that would not hold up to the test of time. Cynthia Lowery of the Associated Press expressed her exasperation with Beatlemania by saying of the Beatles: "Heaven knows we've heard them enough. Getting a radio weather bulletin or time signal has been impossible without running into 'I Want to Hold Your Hand'." Esquire's music critic David Newman wrote, "Terrible awful. ...It's the bunk. The Beatles are indistinguishable from a hundred other similar loud and twanging rock-and-roll groups. They aren't talented singers (as Elvis was), they aren't fun (as Elvis was), they aren't anything." In its contemporary review of the US single, Cash Box described it as "an infectious twist-like thumper that could spread like wildfire here."

In his book Revolution in the Head, Ian MacDonald wrote that the song "electrified American pop", adding: "Every American artist, black or white, asked about 'I Want to Hold Your Hand' has said much the same: it altered everything, ushering in a new era and changing their lives." Bob Dylan said: "They were doing things nobody was doing. Their chords were outrageous, just outrageous, and their harmonies made it all valid." For a time, Dylan thought the Beatles were singing "I get high" instead of "I can't hide". He was surprised when he met them and found out that none of them actually smoked marijuana. The Beach Boys' Brian Wilson recalled his initial reaction to the song: "I flipped. It was like a shock went through my system ... I immediately knew that everything had changed"; he said that he and Mike Love had a meeting to discuss the challenge presented by the Beatles, as "For a while there, we felt really threatened." In another interview, Wilson said the song "wasn't even that great a record, but they [female Beatles fans] just screamed at it ... It got us off our asses in the studio ... we said 'look, don't worry about the Beatles, we'll cut our own stuff.'"

Discussing the Beatles' musical legacy in the 2004 edition of The Rolling Stone Album Guide, Rob Sheffield states:

The Beatles left behind more great music than anybody can process in a lifetime ... Just check out "I Want to Hold Your Hand", which explodes out of the speakers with the most passionate singing, drumming, lyrics, guitars, and girl-crazy howls ever – it's no insult to the Beatles to say they never topped this song because nobody else has either ... It's the most joyous three minutes in the history of human noise.

At the annual Ivor Novello Awards, "I Want to Hold Your Hand" finished second in the category "The 'A' Side of the Record Issued in 1963 Which Achieved the Highest Certified British Sales", behind "She Loves You". The song was nominated for the 1964 Grammy Award for Record of the Year. Still, the award went to Astrud Gilberto and Stan Getz for "The Girl from Ipanema". However, in 1998, the song was inducted into the Grammy Hall of Fame. It has also made the list in The Rock and Roll Hall of Fame's 500 Songs that Shaped Rock and Roll. In addition, the Recording Industry Association of America, the National Endowment for the Arts and Scholastic Press have named "I Want to Hold Your Hand" as one of the Songs of the Century. In 2004, it was ranked number 16 on Rolling Stone's list of "The 500 Greatest Songs of All Time". In 2010, Rolling Stone placed the song at number 2 on its list of the 100 Greatest Beatles Songs, after "A Day in the Life". It was ranked number 2 in Mojo's list on the "100 Records That Changed the World", after Little Richard's "Tutti Frutti". The song was ranked number 39 on Billboard's All Time Top 100. In 2011, Time included the song on its list of the All-TIME 100 Songs. As of December 2018, "I Want to Hold Your Hand" was the 18th best-selling single of all time in the UK.

Starting at the song's final week at the top of the American charts, the Beatles have the all-time record of seven number-one songs in a one-year period. In order, these were "I Want to Hold Your Hand", "She Loves You", "Can't Buy Me Love", "Love Me Do", "A Hard Day's Night", "I Feel Fine" and "Eight Days a Week". It was also the first of seven songs written by Lennon–McCartney to top the US charts in 1964—an all-time record for writing the most songs to hit number one on the US charts in the same calendar year.

== Cover versions and use in pop culture ==
Many other musicians have recorded the song. Notable examples include:

- In 1964, Arthur Fiedler & the Boston Pops Orchestra recorded an instrumental version, which rose to number 55 in the American charts.
- In 1964, Yugoslav band Bijele Strijele released a Serbo-Croatian version of the song entitled "Ljubav nas čeka" ("Love Is Waiting for Us").
- In 1969, soul singer Al Green covered the song.
- In 1969, the Moving Sidewalks covered the song, which appeared as a bonus track on the album Flash. The Melvins covered the song in a version based on the Moving Sidewalks' version in the 2018 album Pinkus Abortion Technician.
- In 1976, pop rock band Sparks recorded a cover version as a single, produced by Rupert Holmes and Jeffrey Lesser. It was later included as a bonus track on the 1994 CD release of their 1975 album Indiscreet and on the 2006 "21st Century Edition" version of their 1976 album Big Beat.
- In 1980, British pop duo Dollar had a UK Top 10 hit with their cover, included on the re-release of their debut album Shooting Stars (1979).
- In 1982, funk band Lakeside covered the song as a ballad and became a Top Ten R&B hit.
- In 1996, singer Manny Manuel covered the song in Spanish as "Dame tu mano y ven" on the compilation album Tropical Tribute to the Beatles. This version peaked at number 13 on the Billboard Hot Latin Songs chart. Manuel's cover led to McCartney receiving a BMI Latin Award in 1997.
- In 2007, the musical Across The Universe's Prudence performed a cover version, and it was included on the soundtrack.
- In 2026, Paul McCartney performed the song for the first time in 60 years at the wedding of Taylor Swift and Travis Kelce.

== Personnel ==
According to Ian MacDonald:

- John Lennon – vocal, rhythm guitar, handclaps
- Paul McCartney – vocal, bass guitar, handclaps
- George Harrison – harmony vocal, lead guitar, handclaps
- Ringo Starr – drums, handclaps

== Charts ==
=== Weekly charts ===
Chart (1963–1964)	Peak position
Australian Kent Music Report	1
Belgium (Ultratop 50 Flanders)	6
Denmark (Salgshitlisterne Top 20)	1
Finland (The Official Finnish Charts)	6
Ireland (IRMA)	2
Netherlands (Single Top 100)	1
New Zealand Lever Hit Parade	1
Norway (VG-lista)	1
Sweden (Kvällstoppen)	1
Sweden (Tio i Topp)	1
UK Singles (Official Charts)	1
US Billboard Hot 100	1
US Cash Box Top 100	1
West Germany (Media Control)	1

Chart (2015)	Peak position
Sweden Heatseeker (Sverigetopplistan)	7

=== Year-end charts ===
Chart (1963)	Rank
UK Singles (OCC)	23
Australia	1

Chart (1964)	Rank
UK Singles (OCC)	23
US Billboard Hot 100	1
US Cash Box Top 100	1

=== All-time charts ===
Chart (1958–2018)	Position
US Billboard Hot 100	48

== Certifications and sales ==
Region	Certification	Certified units/sales
Belgium	—	126,000
New Zealand (RMNZ)	Platinum	30,000^{‡}
Spain (Promusicae)	Gold	30,000^{‡}
United Kingdom (BPI)	Gold	1,810,829
United States (RIAA)	Gold	5,000,000
Summaries
Worldwide	—	12,000,000
^{‡} Sales+streaming figures based on certification alone.
