= Beatles VI =

Studio album by the Beatles
- Released: 14 June 1965
- Recorded: 29 September 1964 – 10 May 1965
- Studio: EMI, London
- Genre: Rock and roll
- Length: 27:45
- Label: Capitol
- Producer: George Martin

The Beatles North American chronology
The Early Beatles (1965)	Beatles VI (1965)	Help! (1965)

Singles from Beatles VI
- 1. "Eight Days a Week" Released: 15 February 1965

Professional ratings
Review scores
Source	Rating
AllMusic	3.5/5 stars
The Encyclopedia of Popular Music	2/5 stars
The Rolling Stone Record Guide	4/5 stars

Beatles VI is the seventh Capitol Records studio album by the English rock band the Beatles in the United States and Canada (including The Beatles' Story). It was the ninth album released into that market in less than one and a half years (Vee-Jay Records and United Artists Records also released one album each during that period). The LP was released in both mono and stereo versions.

Beatles VI reached number one on the Billboard for six weeks, beginning on 10 July 1965.

This LP was also released in New Zealand in stereo in time for Christmas 1966. The pressing plates were obtained from EMI (UK) and are identical to their export-release. The title on the record label erroneously reads Beatles IV, and the catalogue number is PCSM 6042. Beatles VI is available on CD as part of The Capitol Albums, Volume 2 box set in both stereo and mono mixes (catalogue number CDP 0946 3 57499 2 2.) In 2014, Beatles VI was issued on CD again, individually and as part of The U.S. Albums boxed set.

== Music ==
Beatles VI includes two tracks featuring searing John Lennon vocals, recorded specifically for the North American market: "Bad Boy" and "Dizzy Miss Lizzy", both covers of Larry Williams songs, and both recorded on Williams' birthday (10 May 1965), marking perhaps the only time that the Beatles recorded material especially for North America. "Dizzy Miss Lizzy" was part of the set of their 1965 US concerts and was soon included on the British release of the Help! album, but "Bad Boy" was not released in the United Kingdom or anywhere else in the world until 1966, when it appeared on the compilation A Collection of Beatles Oldies. These two songs, along with "Act Naturally" the following month, were the last cover songs recorded and released by the Beatles until "Maggie Mae" appeared on the Let It Be album in 1970.

Beatles VI also included:

- the remaining six tracks from Beatles for Sale (i.e., those left off Beatles '65, although two such songs had been released on a single in February 1965).
- "Yes It Is", the B-side to the single "Ticket to Ride". This is a "duophonic" stereo remix from the original mono track, with additional echo and reverb.
- two other tracks from the forthcoming UK release of Help!: "You Like Me Too Much" and "Tell Me What You See".

As on Beatles for Sale, the "Kansas City"/"Hey-Hey-Hey-Hey!" medley was originally listed only as "Kansas City". After attorneys for Venice Music notified Capitol of its error, the record label was soon corrected, although the album cover never was.

== Track listing ==
All tracks are written by Lennon–McCartney, except where noted.

Side one
No.	Title	Writer(s)	Lead vocals	Length
1.	"Kansas City"/"Hey, Hey, Hey, Hey"	Jerry Leiber; Mike Stoller; Richard Penniman	McCartney	2:30
2.	"Eight Days a Week"		Lennon with McCartney	2:43
3.	"You Like Me Too Much"	George Harrison	Harrison	2:34
4.	"Bad Boy"	Larry Williams	Lennon	2:17
5.	"I Don't Want to Spoil the Party"		Lennon with McCartney	2:33
6.	"Words of Love"	Buddy Holly	Lennon and McCartney	2:10
Total length:				14:47

Side two
No.	Title	Writer(s)	Lead vocals	Length
1.	"What You're Doing"		McCartney	2:30
2.	"Yes It Is"		Lennon with Harrison and McCartney	2:40
3.	"Dizzy Miss Lizzy"	Larry Williams	Lennon	2:51
4.	"Tell Me What You See"		McCartney with Lennon	2:35
5.	"Every Little Thing"		Lennon with McCartney	2:01
Total length:				12:37

== Charts and certifications ==
In the U.S., the album sold 899,025 copies by 31 December 1965 and 1,094,707 copies by the end of the decade.

=== Chart performance ===
Chart (1965–66)	Peak position
German Albums (Offizielle Top 100)	15
US Billboard Top LPs	1

== Certifications ==
Region	Certification	Certified units/sales
Canada (Music Canada)	Gold	50,000^{^}
United States (RIAA)	Platinum	1,000,000^{^}
^{^} Shipments figures based on certification alone.

== See also ==
- Outline of the Beatles
- The Beatles timeline

== Notes ==
- Whitburn, Joel (2010), Joel Whitburn Presents Top Pop Albums, Seventh Edition, Record Research Inc., ISBN 978-0-89820-183-3
