= The Beatles singles discography =

Singles recorded by English rock band

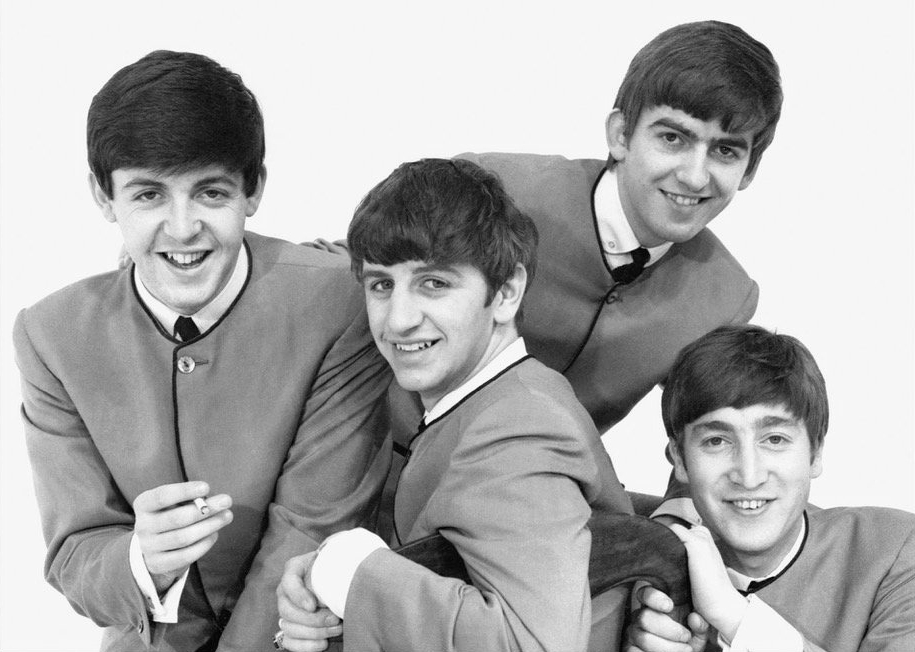
- The Beatles in 1963, from the US single artwork of "I Want to Hold Your Hand"
- Singles: 65

The English rock band the Beatles released 65 singles worldwide. In their native United Kingdom, during their active existence as a band, they released 22 singles (including four double A-sided singles). The early singles released from 1962 to March 1968 were originally on Parlophone, and their singles from August 1968 to 1970 were on their subsidiary label Apple.

"Love Me Do" was their first single to reach the UK Singles Chart, originally peaking at number 17, before it reached a new peak of number four when it was reissued in 1982. "From Me to You" became their first number one single in the UK. On the Billboard Hot 100, "I Want to Hold Your Hand" was the first single to reach that chart and was their first number one in the United States in 1964. They had five other singles top the Billboard Hot 100 that year, "She Loves You", "Can't Buy Me Love", "Love Me Do", "A Hard Day's Night" and "I Feel Fine".

The Beatles have twenty Billboard Hot 100 number-ones, leading all acts since 1965, surpassing the record previously held by Elvis Presley.

== Singles ==
List of singles, with selected chart positions and certificationsAll records released on Parlophone in the UK and Capitol in the US except where noted in the footnotes
Title (A-side/B-side)	Year	Peak chart positions											Certifications	UK album	US album
Title (A-side/B-side)	Year	UK	AUS	BEL	CAN	FIN	GER	NLD	NOR	NZ	SWE	US	Certifications	UK album	US album
"My Bonnie" (Note: Released in the UK on Polydor and Decca in the US.) "The Saints" (with Tony Sheridan, originally labelled as "Tony Sheridan & the Beat Brothers")	1961	48 (Note: Peak in 1963.) —	29 (Note: Peak position in 1964.) —	— —	— —	17 —	32 —	— —	— —	— —	19 —	26 —		My Bonnie; Polydor	In the Beginning (Circa 1960)
"Love Me Do" (Note: Released in the US on Tollie Records which was a subsidiary of VeeJay) "P.S. I Love You"	1962	4 (Note: "Love Me Do" originally peaked at number 17, but reached a new UK chart peak of number four when reissued in 1982.) —	1 —	37 (Note: "Love Me Do" reached a new UK chart peak of No. 4 when reissued in 1982.) —	8 —	— —	— —	32 (Note: "Love Me Do" reached a new UK chart peak of No. 4 when reissued in 1982.) —	— —	1 —	— —	1; 10	BPI: Gold; RIAA: Platinum; RMNZ: Gold	A-side on Past Masters (different version on Please Please Me) B-side on Please Please Me	Introducing... The Beatles (Note: The first pressings of Introducing... the Beatles included "Love Me Do" and "P.S. I Love You". After Capitol subsidiary Beechwood Music took legal action, the songs were replaced by "Ask Me Why" and "Please Please Me".); VeeJay
"Please Please Me" (Note: Released in the US on VeeJay.) "Ask Me Why"	1963	2 —	36 (Note: "Please Please Me" originally peaked at number 52 in 1963, before being reissued in 1964 and peaking at number 36.) —	— —	— —	32 —	20 —	— —	— —	2 —	16 —	— —		Please Please Me	Introducing... The Beatles; VeeJay
"From Me to You" "Thank You Girl"	1963	1 —	9 —	— —	6 —	— —	— —	— —	9 —	1 —	5 —	116 —		A-side on A Collection of Beatles Oldies B-side on Rarities	Jolly What! The Beatles and Frank Ifield on Stage; VeeJay
"She Loves You" (Note: Released in the US on Swan.) "I'll Get You"	1963	1 —	3	5 —	1 —	4 —	7 —	7 —	1 —	1 —	1 —	1 —	BPI: Silver	A-side on A Collection of Beatles Oldies B-side on Rarities	The Beatles' Second Album
"Twist and Shout" "Boys" (Europe) "There's a Place" (US) Not released in the UK (Note: "Twist and Shout" was initially released as a single on Odeon in Germany and Scandinavia in 1963, before being released elsewhere in 1964. It was released in the US on Tollie.)	1963	— — —	— — —	— — —	5 — —	1 — —	10 — —	9 — —	7 — —	1 — —	2 — —	2 — 74	BPI: 2× Platinum; RIAA: Platinum; RMNZ: Platinum	Please Please Me	Introducing... The Beatles
"I Want to Hold Your Hand" "This Boy" (UK) "I Saw Her Standing There" (US)	1963	1 — —	1; 1; 1 (Note: In Australia and New Zealand, "I Saw Her Standing There" was released as the flip side to "Love Me Do".)	6 — —	1 — 1	6 — —	1 — —	1 — —	1 — —	1 — 1	1 — 13 (Note: In Scandinavia, "I Saw Her Standing There" was released as the flip side to "All My Loving".)	1 — 14	BPI: Platinum; BPI: Silver ("I Saw Her Standing There"); RMNZ: Platinum; RMNZ: Gold ("I Saw Her Standing There"); RIAA: Gold	A-side: A Collection of Beatles Oldies UK B-side: Love Songs US B-side: Please Please Me	Meet the Beatles!
"Roll Over Beethoven" "Please Mister Postman" Not released in the UK	1963	— —	1 —	— —	2 —	30 —	31 —	— —	2 —	— —	11 —	68 (Note: "Roll Over Beethoven" charted in the US as an import of the Canadian release.) —		With the Beatles	The Beatles' Second Album
"Misery" "Ask Me Why" Continental European single (Note: This single was only released in Germany and the Netherlands on Odeon, though in the Netherlands, the sides were flipped and "Ask Me Why" was the A-side.)	1963	— —	— —	— —	— —	— —	37 —	— —	— —	— —	— —	— —		Please Please Me	Introducing... The Beatles; VeeJay
"Please Please Me" "From Me to You" US and Canada reissue	1964	— —	— —	— —	5 —	— —	— —	— —	— —	— —	— —	3; 41	RIAA: Platinum	A-side on Please Please Me B-side on A Collection of Beatles Oldies	A-side on Introducing... The Beatles; VeeJay B-side on Jolly What! The Beatles and Frank Ifield on Stage; VeeJay
"Sweet Georgia Brown" "Nobody's Child" (Germany) "Take Out Some Insurance on Me, Baby" (US) (with Tony Sheridan) German and US single (Note: Released in Germany on Polydor and in the US on Atco.)	1964	— — —	— — —	— — —	— — —	— — —	— — —	— — —	— — —	— — —	— — —	— — —		My Bonnie; Polydor Both B-sides on The Beatles' First; Polydor	In the Beginning (Circa 1960)
"All My Loving" "This Boy" Not released in the UK	1964	— —	1 —	16 —	1	1 —	32 —	2 —	2 —	1 —	1 —	45 —	BPI: Silver	A-side on With the Beatles B-side on Love Songs	Meet the Beatles!
"Cry for a Shadow" (Note: "Cry for a Shadow" was released in the UK on Polydor. In the US and Canada, the sides were flipped and "Why" was the A-side, released on MGM.) "Why" (with Tony Sheridan)	1964	— —	32 —	— —	— —	— —	— —	— —	— —	— —	— —	— 88		The Beatles' First; Polydor	In the Beginning (Circa 1960)
"Komm, gib mir deine Hand" "Sie liebt dich" German and Australian single (Note: Released in Germany on Odeon.)	1964	— —	— —	— —	— —	— —	1; 7	— —	— —	— —	— —	— —		Rarities	A-side on Something New B-side on Rarities
"Can't Buy Me Love" "You Can't Do That"	1964	1 —	1	5 —	3; 33	3 —	24 —	1 —	3 —	1 —	1 —	1; 48	RIAA: Gold; BPI: Silver; RMNZ: Gold	A Hard Day's Night	A-side on A Hard Day's Night; United Artists B-side on The Beatles' Second Album
"Do You Want to Know a Secret" "Thank You Girl" Not released in the UK	1964	— —	— —	— —	— —	— —	34 —	— —	— —	2 —	— —	2; 35	RIAA: Gold	A-side on Please Please Me B-side on Rarities	A-side on Introducing... The Beatles; VeeJay B-side on The Beatles' Second Album
"Sie liebt dich" "I'll Get You" US and Canadian single	1964	— —	— —	— —	20 —	— —	— —	— —	— —	— —	— —	97 —		Rarities	A-side on Rarities B-side on The Beatles' Second Album
"Ain't She Sweet" (Note: Released in the UK on Polydor and in the UK on Atco.) "If You Love Me, Baby" (UK) "Nobody's Child" (US) (with Tony Sheridan)	1964	29 — —	16 — —	— — —	20 — —	— — —	— — —	— — —	— — —	— — —	4 — —	19 — —		The Beatles' First; Polydor	In the Beginning (Circa 1960)
"Long Tall Sally" "I Call Your Name" Not released in the UK	1964	— —	— —	7 —	— —	4 —	7 —	1 —	2 —	— —	1 —	— —		Rock 'n' Roll Music	The Beatles' Second Album
"Please Mister Postman" "Hold Me Tight" German single	1964	— —	— —	— —	— —	— —	47 —	— —	— —	— —	— —	— —		With the Beatles	A-side on The Beatles' Second Album B-side on Meet the Beatles!
"A Hard Day's Night" "Things We Said Today" (UK) "I Should Have Known Better" (US)	1964	1 — —	1; 1 —	4 — —	1 — —	1 — —	2 — —	1 — —	1 — —	1 — —	1 — —	1 — 53	BPI: Gold; RIAA: Gold	A Hard Day's Night	A-side and US B-side on A Hard Day's Night; United Artists UK B-side on Something New
"I'll Cry Instead" "I'm Happy Just to Dance with You" Not released in the UK	1964	— —	— —	— —	16; 20	— —	— —	— —	— —	— —	— —	25; 95		A Hard Day's Night	A Hard Day's Night; United Artists
"And I Love Her" "If I Fell" Not released in the UK	1964	— —	44 —	10 —	15 —	— —	— —	— —	— —	— —	— —	12; 53		A Hard Day's Night	A Hard Day's Night; United Artists
"I Should Have Known Better" "Tell Me Why" (Continental Europe) "If I Fell" (Australia) Not released in the UK	1964	— — —	1 — 1	— — —	— — —	1 — —	6 — —	1 — —	1 — —	— — —	1 — —	— — —		A Hard Day's Night	A Hard Day's Night; United Artists
"Matchbox" "Slow Down" Not released in the UK	1964	— —	— —	— —	6 —	— —	— —	— —	— —	— —	— —	17; 25		Rock 'n' Roll Music	Something New
"I Feel Fine" "She's a Woman"	1964	1 —	1	3 —	1 —	2 —	3 —	1 —	1 —	1; 1	1 —	1; 4	RIAA: Gold	A-side on A Collection of Beatles Oldies B-side on Rarities	Beatles '65
"If I Fell" "Tell Me Why" UK export single (Note: The single was intended for export, but some retailers sold it in the UK anyway. It did not chart there and is not considered an "official" UK single.)	1964	— —	— —	— —	— —	32 —	25 —	3 —	1 —	— —	— —	— —		A Hard Day's Night	Something New
"Eight Days a Week" "I Don't Want to Spoil the Party" Not released in the UK	1965	— —	— —	9 —	1 —	— —	5 —	1 —	— —	— —	— —	1; 39	BPI: Silver; RIAA: Gold; RMNZ: 2× Platinum	Beatles for Sale	Beatles VI
"Ticket to Ride" "Yes It Is"	1965	1 —	1	10 —	1 —	3 —	2 —	1 —	1 —	1 —	1 —	1; 46	BPI: Silver; RMNZ: Gold	A-side on Help! B-side on Love Songs	A-side on Help! B-side on Beatles VI
"No Reply" "Rock and Roll Music" Not released in the UK	1965	— —	— —	— —	— —	— —	— —	6; 2	— —	— —	— —	— —		Beatles for Sale	Beatles '65
"Rock and Roll Music" "I'm a Loser" Not released in the UK	1965	— —	1 —	3 —	— —	1 —	2 —	— —	1 —	— —	1 —	— —		Beatles for Sale	Beatles '65
"Kansas City" "I Don't Want to Spoil the Party" German single	1965	— —	— —	— —	— —	— —	18 —	— —	— —	— —	— —	— —		Beatles for Sale	Beatles VI
"I'll Follow the Sun" "I Don't Want to Spoil the Party" Scandinavian single	1965	— —	— —	— —	— —	— —	— —	— —	10 —	— —	4 —	— —		Beatles for Sale	A-side on Beatles '65 B-side on Beatles VI
"Help!" "I'm Down"	1965	1 —	1	5 —	1 —	2 —	2 —	1 —	1 —	1 —	1 —	1; 101	BPI: Platinum; RIAA: Gold; RMNZ: Platinum	A-side on Help! B-side on Rock 'n' Roll Music	A-side on Help! B-side on Rock 'n' Roll Music
"Yesterday" "Act Naturally" Not released in the UK	1965	— —	2	1 —	4 —	1 —	6 —	1 —	1 —	2 —	1 —	1; 47	BPI: Platinum; RIAA: Gold; RMNZ: 2× Platinum	Help!	Yesterday and Today
"Roll Over Beethoven" "Misery" US single	1965	— —	— —	— —	— —	— —	— —	— —	— —	— —	— —	— —		A-side on With the Beatles B-side on Please Please Me	The Beatles' Second Album Introducing... the Beatles; VeeJay
"Boys" "Kansas City" US and Canada single	1965	— —	— —	— —	32 —	— —	— —	— —	— —	— —	— —	102 —		A-side on Please Please Me B-side on Beatles For Sale	A-side on Introducing... The Beatles; VeeJay B-side on Beatles VI
"We Can Work It Out" "Day Tripper" Double A-side in UK	1965	1	1	3 —	1 —	1	2 —	1	— 1	9; 8	1	1; 5	BPI: Silver ("Day Tripper"); RIAA: Gold ("We Can Work It Out"); RMNZ: Gold ("Day Tripper")	A Collection of Beatles Oldies	Yesterday and Today
"Michelle" "Girl" European single (not including UK)	1966	— —	— —	1 —	— —	1	6 —	1 —	1 —	1 —	1 —	— —	BPI: Silver; IFPI NOR: Silver	Rubber Soul	Rubber Soul
"Nowhere Man" "What Goes On" Not released in the UK	1966	— —	1 —	— —	1 —	36 —	3 —	— —	— —	— —	— —	3; 81	BPI: Silver ("Nowhere Man"); RIAA: Gold	Rubber Soul	Yesterday and Today
"Paperback Writer" "Rain"	1966	1 —	1	7 —	1 —	4 —	1 —	1 —	1 —	1 —	1 —	1; 23	RIAA: Gold	A-side on A Collection of Beatles Oldies B-side on Rarities	Hey Jude; Apple
"Yellow Submarine" "Eleanor Rigby" Double A-side in UK	1966	1	1	1 —	1	6	1 —	1	1 —	1; 1	1 —	2; 11	BPI: Gold; RIAA: Gold; RMNZ: Gold; BPI: Gold	Revolver	
"Penny Lane" "Strawberry Fields Forever" Double A-side in UK	1967	2	1	4 —	1	4	1 —	1	— 1	1; 5	1	1; 8	BPI: Gold; RIAA: Gold; RMNZ: Gold	1967–1970 Apple	Magical Mystery Tour (Note: Under the revised 1967 contract, Capitol agreed to release the unaltered UK versions of Beatles albums; these joint releases span both columns in this table. Capitol however continued to create additional albums from singles, EP tracks, and previously unused album tracks, specifically Magical Mystery Tour and Hey Jude.)
"All You Need Is Love" "Baby, You're a Rich Man"	1967	1 —	1	4 —	1 —	3 —	1 —	1 —	1 —	1 —	1 —	1; 34	BPI: Gold; RIAA: Gold; RMNZ: Gold	A-side on Yellow Submarine Apple B-side on Magical Mystery Tour	Magical Mystery Tour
"Hello, Goodbye" "I Am the Walrus"	1967	1 —	1	2 —	1 —	11 —	1 —	1 —	1 —	1; 17	1 —	1; 56	RIAA: Gold	A-side on 1967–1970 Apple B-side on Magical Mystery Tour (EP)	Magical Mystery Tour
"Lady Madonna" "The Inner Light"	1968	1 —	1	3 —	1 —	7 —	2 —	1 —	2 —	1 —	1 —	4; 96	RIAA: Platinum	A-side on 1967–1970 Apple B-side on Rarities	A-side on Hey Jude; Apple B-side on Rarities
"Hey Jude" (Note: Released on Apple.) "Revolution"	1968	1 —	1	1 —	1 —	5 —	1 —	1 —	1 —	1; 1	1 —	1; 12	BPI: 2× Platinum ("Hey Jude") / Silver ("Revolution"); RIAA: 4× Platinum; RMNZ: Platinum ("Hey Jude")	1967–1970; Apple	Hey Jude; Apple
"Ob-La-Di, Ob-La-Da" "While My Guitar Gently Weeps" Not released in the UK	1968	— —	1	5 —	— —	15 —	1 —	3 —	— —	1 —	— —	— —	BPI: Gold (both sides); RMNZ: Platinum ("While My Guitar Gently Weeps"); RMNZ: Platinum ("Ob-La-Di, Ob-La-Da")	The Beatles; Apple	
"Back in the U.S.S.R." "Don't Pass Me By" Scandinavian single	1969	— —	— —	— —	— —	31 —	— —	— —	— —	— —	7 —	— —	BPI: Silver	The Beatles; Apple	
"Get Back" "Don't Let Me Down" (with Billy Preston)	1969	1 —	1	1 —	1 —	4 —	1 —	1 —	1 —	1 —	1 —	1; 35	BPI: Gold; RIAA: 2× Platinum; RMNZ: Gold	1967–1970; Apple (different version of A-side on Let It Be)	A-side on 1967–1970; Apple (different version on Let It Be) B-side on Hey Jude; Apple
"The Ballad of John and Yoko" "Old Brown Shoe"	1969	1 —	1 —	1 —	7 —	8 —	1 —	1 —	1 —	2 —	2 —	8 —	RIAA: Gold	1967–1970; Apple	Hey Jude; Apple
"Something" "Come Together" Double A-side	1969	4	1	— 2	1 —	12	1; 3	— 2	2 —	1; 1	6; 41 (Note: Peak in 2016.)	1 (Note: Billboard "Chart Beat" writer Fred Bronson affirms that "Come Together" and "Something" combined to hold the number-one position on the Hot 100, while another recognised author, Joel Whitburn, shows "Something" at number three, its highest position prior to the titles being combined halfway through the record's chart run.)	BPI: Platinum ("Something") / 2× Platinum ("Come Together"); RIAA: 2× Platinum; RMNZ: Platinum ("Something") / 2× Platinum ("Come Together")	Abbey Road; Apple	
"Let It Be" "You Know My Name (Look Up the Number)"	1970	2 —	1 —	3 —	1 —	6 —	2 —	1 —	1 —	1 —	3 —	1 —	BPI: 2× Platinum; BVMI: Gold; RIAA: 2× Platinum; RMNZ: 3× Platinum	A-side on 1967–1970; Apple (different version on Let It Be) B-side on Rarities	
"The Long and Winding Road" "For You Blue" Not released in the UK	1970	— —	7 —	8 —	1; 4	— —	26 —	11 —	— —	3 —	— —	1 —	BPI: Silver; RIAA: Platinum; RMNZ: Gold ("The Long and Winding Road")	Let It Be; Apple	
"All Together Now" "Hey Bulldog" European and South African single	1972	— —	— —	— —	— —	— —	— —	16 —	— —	— —	— —	— —		Yellow Submarine; Apple	
"Yesterday" "I Should Have Known Better"	1976	8 —	86 —	— —	— —	— —	— —	26 —	— —	— —	— —	— —		A-side on Help! B-side on A Hard Day's Night	A-side on Yesterday and Today B-side on A Hard Day's Night'; United Artists
"Got to Get You into My Life" "Helter Skelter" Not released in the UK	1976	— —	93 —	— —	1 —	— —	— —	— —	— —	— —	— —	7 —	RIAA: Gold	A-side on Revolver B-side on The Beatles; Apple	
"Back in the U.S.S.R." "Twist and Shout"	1976	19 — (Note: In 2010, it made it to #48 in the UK)	— —	— —	— —	— —	— —	— —	— —	44 (Note: Peak in 1980.) —	19 —	— —		A-side on The Beatles; Apple B-side on Please Please Me	A-side on The Beatles; Apple B-side on Introducing The Beatles
"Ob-La-Di, Ob-La-Da" "Julia" US and Canadian single	1976	— —	— —	— —	19 —	— —	— —	— —	— —	— —	— —	49 —		The Beatles; Apple	
"Sgt. Pepper's Lonely Hearts Club Band" / "With a Little Help from My Friends" "A Day in the Life" (Note: "Sgt. Pepper's Lonely Hearts Club Band" and "With a Little Help from My Friends" were released as a medley on side A with "A Day in the Life" on the B-side. In some European countries, the B-side was "Within You Without You".)	1978	63 —	78 —	— —	— —	— —	— —	— —	— —	— —	— —	71 —	BPI: Silver (all three songs); RMNZ: Gold ("With a Little Help from My Friends" and "A Day in the Life")	Sgt. Pepper's Lonely Hearts Club Band	
"The Beatles' Movie Medley" "I'm Happy Just to Dance with You"	1982	10 —	33 —	35 —	— —	— —	— —	24 —	— —	— —	— —	12 —		A-side non-album track B-side on A Hard Day's Night	A-side non-album track B-side on A Hard Day's Night; United Artists
"Baby It's You" (Note: "Baby It's You" was released on Apple as a CD maxi single with the tracks "I'll Follow the Sun", "Devil in Her Heart" and "Boys". These live versions of "I'll Follow the Sun" and "Boys" were later released on On Air – Live at the BBC Volume 2.)	1995	7	33	43	67	—	94	44	—	30	—	67		Live at the BBC; Apple	
"Free as a Bird" (Note: "Free as a Bird" was released on Apple as a CD maxi single with the additional tracks "I Saw Her Standing There" and "This Boy".) "Christmas Time (Is Here Again)"	1995	2 —	6 —	11 —	6 —	7 —	37 —	9 —	14 —	26 —	3 —	6 —	BPI: Silver; RIAA: Gold	A-side on Anthology 1 Apple B-side non-album track	
"Real Love" (Note: "Real Love" was released on Apple as a CD maxi single with the additional tracks "Yellow Submarine" and "Here, There and Everywhere".) "Baby's in Black"	1996	4 —	6 —	50 —	12 —	4 —	45 —	21 —	— —	— —	2 —	11 —	RIAA: Gold	A-side on Anthology 2 Apple B-side non-album track (Note: This live version of "Baby's in Black" was later released on Live at the Hollywood Bowl.)	
"Now and Then" "Love Me Do"	2023	1 —	6 —	8 —	10 —	47 —	1 —	5 —	15 —	17 — (Note: "Love Me Do" (2023 mix) did not enter the NZ Top 40 Singles Chart, but peaked at number 10 on the NZ Hot Singles Chart.)	8 —	7 —	BPI: Silver	A-side on 1967–1970 (2023 edition) B-side on 1962–1966 (2023 edition)	
"—" denotes that the recording did not chart or was not released in that territory.

=== Billboard Year-End performances ===
Year	Song	Year-End position
1964	"I Want to Hold Your Hand"	1
1964	"She Loves You"	2
1964	"A Hard Day's Night"	13
1964	"Love Me Do"	14
1964	"Please Please Me"	16
1964	"Twist and Shout"	40
1964	"Can't Buy Me Love"	52
1964	"Do You Want to Know a Secret"	55
1964	"I Saw Her Standing There"	95
1965	"Help!"	7
1965	"Ticket to Ride"	31
1965	"Eight Days a Week"	55
1966	"We Can Work It Out"	49
1966	"Paperback Writer"	57
1966	"Nowhere Man"	84
1966	"Yellow Submarine"	90
1967	"All You Need Is Love"	30
1967	"Penny Lane"	55
1968	"Hey Jude"	1
1968	"Lady Madonna"	60
1968	"Revolution"	78
1969	"Get Back"	25
1969	"Something"	83
1969	"Come Together"	85
1970	"Let It Be"	9
1970	"The Long and Winding Road"	41
1976	"Got to Get You into My Life"	78

== Other charted or certified songs ==
List of other charted songs, with selected chart positions and certifications
Title	Year	Peak chart positions						Certifications	Album
Title	Year	UK	BEL (WA)	NLD	NOR	SWE	US	Certifications	Album
"You've Got To Hide Your Love Away"	1965	—	—	—	—	—	—	BPI: Silver	Help
"Drive My Car"	1965	—	1	—	—	—	—	BPI: Silver	Rubber Soul
"Norwegian Wood (This Bird Has Flown)"	1965	—	—	—	—	—	—	BPI: Gold; RMNZ: Gold	Rubber Soul
"In My Life"	1965	78	—	—	—	—	— (Note: "In My Life" did not enter the Billboard Hot 100, but peaked at number nine on the Hot 100 Recurrents Singles chart.)	BPI: Platinum; RMNZ: Platinum	Rubber Soul
"Bad Boy"	1965	—	—	—	—	7	—		Beatles VI
"Here, There and Everywhere"	1966	—	—	—	—	—	—	BPI: Silver	Revolver
"Lucy in the Sky with Diamonds"	1967	—	—	—	—	—	—	BPI: Silver; RMNZ: Gold	Sgt. Pepper's Lonely Hearts Club Band
"When I'm Sixty-Four"	1967	—	—	—	—	—	—	BPI: Silver	Sgt. Pepper's Lonely Hearts Club Band
"Magical Mystery Tour"	1967	2	—	2	5	—	—		Magical Mystery Tour
"Blackbird"	1968	— (Note: "Blackbird" did not enter the UK Singles Chart, but peaked at number 31 on the UK Streaming Songs chart.)	—	91	—	—	— (Note: "Blackbird" did not enter the Billboard Hot 100, but peaked at number 20 on the Hot 100 Recurrents Singles chart.)	BPI: Platinum; RMNZ: 2× Platinum	The Beatles
"Octopus's Garden"	1969	—	—	—	—	—	—	BPI: Silver	Abbey Road
"Here Comes the Sun"	1969	58	—	52	—	49	—	BPI: 4× Platinum; BVMI: Gold; RMNZ: 6× Platinum	Abbey Road
"Oh! Darling"	1969	—	—	—	—	—	—	BPI: Silver	Abbey Road
"Golden Slumbers"	1969	—	—	—	—	—	—	BPI: Silver	Abbey Road
"Across the Universe"	1969	—	—	—	—	—	—	BPI: Silver	Let It Be
"—" denotes that the recording did not chart.

== Other appearances ==
The Beatles notably very rarely appear on compilation albums with other artists.

List of Beatles tracks on multiple artist compilations
Album	Year	Track
No One's Gonna Change Our World	1969	"Across the Universe" (original version)
The Best of George Harrison	1976	"Something"
The Best of George Harrison	1976	"If I Needed Someone"
The Best of George Harrison	1976	"Here Comes the Sun"
The Best of George Harrison	1976	"Taxman"
The Best of George Harrison	1976	"Think for Yourself"
The Best of George Harrison	1976	"For You Blue"
The Best of George Harrison	1976	"While My Guitar Gently Weeps"
Now That's What I Call Music – The Summer Album	1986	"All You Need Is Love"
Now That's What I Call Music – The Summer Album	1986	"Here Comes the Sun"
Imagine: John Lennon (soundtrack)	1988	"Twist and Shout"
Imagine: John Lennon (soundtrack)	1988	"Help!"
Imagine: John Lennon (soundtrack)	1988	"In My Life"
Imagine: John Lennon (soundtrack)	1988	"Strawberry Fields Forever"
Imagine: John Lennon (soundtrack)	1988	"A Day in the Life"
Imagine: John Lennon (soundtrack)	1988	"Revolution"
Imagine: John Lennon (soundtrack)	1988	"The Ballad of John and Yoko"
Imagine: John Lennon (soundtrack)	1988	"Julia"
Imagine: John Lennon (soundtrack)	1988	"Don't Let Me Down" (with Billy Preston)
Produced by George Martin	2001	"Please Please Me"
Produced by George Martin	2001	"I Want to Hold Your Hand"
Produced by George Martin	2001	"Yesterday"
Produced by George Martin	2001	"In My Life"
Jojo Rabbit	2019	"Komm, gib mir deine Hand"

== See also ==
- List of songs recorded by the Beatles
- The Beatles albums discography
- The Beatles videography
- Outline of the Beatles
- The Beatles timeline
- Apple Records discography, the albums and singles of the Beatles' record label, many of which had involvement by members of the Beatles
- The Beatles bootleg recordings
- The Beatles' recording sessions
