= Very Together =

Compilation album by the Beatles with Tony Sheridan
- Released: 4 November 1969
- Recorded: March–September 1961, Hamburg, West Germany
- Genre: Rock and roll
- Length: 36:35
- Language: English
- Label: Polydor
- Producer: Bert Kaempfert

Professional ratings
Review scores
Source	Rating
AllMusic	2/5 stars

Very Together is an album by the English rock band the Beatles and the first compilation of the band's early recordings supporting Tony Sheridan to be released in Canada. It was issued in November 1969 by Polydor Records, with the catalogue number 242.008. The cover photograph features four candles, one of which has been extinguished – a reference to the "Paul is dead" urban legend.

One of four Beatles albums to be released only in Canada, its scarcity in any condition is considerable. The content of the album is identical to that of the previously released European album The Beatles' First! and the American album In the Beginning (Circa 1960) issued the following year. Four songs credited to Tony Sheridan and The Beat Brothers, performed by other musicians, were added to the tracklist.

== Track listing ==
All vocals by Tony Sheridan unless otherwise indicated.

Side one

1. "Ain't She Sweet" (Milton Ager, Jack Yellen) – 2:10 (John Lennon vocal)
2. "Cry for a Shadow" (George Harrison, John Lennon) – 2:22 (instrumental)
3. "Let's Dance" (Lee) – 2:32 (by Tony Sheridan & The Beat Brothers)
4. "My Bonnie" (traditional) – 2:06
5. "Take Out Some Insurance on Me, Baby" (Hall, Charles Singleton) – 2:52
6. "What'd I Say" (Ray Charles) – 2:37 (by Tony Sheridan & the Beat Brothers)

Side two

7. "Sweet Georgia Brown" (Bernie, Casey, Pinkard) – 2:03
8. "When the Saints Go Marching In" (traditional) – 3:19
9. "Ruby Baby" (Jerry Leiber, Mike Stoller) – 2:48 (by Tony Sheridan & the Beat Brothers)
10. "Why" (Compton, Sheridan) – 2:55
11. "Nobody's Child" (Cy Coben, Mel Foree) – 3:52
12. "Ya Ya" (Lee Dorsey, Robinson) – 2:48 (by Tony Sheridan & the Beat Brothers)
