= The Early Tapes of the Beatles =

The Early Tapes of The Beatles

Compilation album by the Beatles featuring Tony Sheridan
- Released: 10 December 1984
- Recorded: March–September 1961, Hamburg, Germany
- Genre: Rock and roll
- Length: 40:17
- Language: English
- Label: Polydor
- Producer: Bert Kaempfert

The Beatles and Tony Sheridan chronology
| In the Beginning (Circa 1960) (1970) | The Early Tapes of The Beatles (1984) | Beatles Bop – Hamburg Days (2001) |

Alternative cover
- Cover of 2004 reissue on the Spectrum label

Professional ratings
Review scores
| Source | Rating |
|---|---|
| Allmusic | 2.5/5 stars |

The Early Tapes of The Beatles is the first digital repackaging of The Beatles' First !, the 1964 German compilation album of Tony Sheridan and The Beatles recordings. The songs were recorded in Hamburg between 1961 and 1963. Most of the tracks feature vocals by Sheridan. Only tracks 1–5, 7, 10, and 11 actually feature the Beatles, with John Lennon singing lead on "Ain't She Sweet" and featuring "Cry for a Shadow", an instrumental written and performed by the British group alone. The other songs are performed by Sheridan and other musicians, identified as "The Beat Brothers". This CD, which was released in 1984, includes two additional tracks and an extended version of "Ya Ya" and was reissued in 2004 with a different design on Universal Music's Spectrum label.

The song "Take Out Some Insurance on Me, Baby" was originally mistitled "If You Love Me, Baby" on all versions until 1970, when in the US, its proper title was used. This CD reverted to the unofficial title.

== Track listing ==
All vocals by Tony Sheridan unless otherwise indicated.

1. "Ain't She Sweet" (Milton Ager, Jack Yellen) (vocal: John Lennon) – 2:15
2. "Cry for a Shadow" (George Harrison, John Lennon) (instrumental) – 2:25
3. "When the Saints Go Marching In" (traditional) – 3:21
4. "Why" (Bill Crompton, Tony Sheridan) – 3:00
5. "If You Love Me, Baby" (Charles Singleton, Waldenese Hall) – 2:56
6. "What'd I Say" (Ray Charles) (performed by Tony Sheridan & The Beat Brothers) – 2:40
7. "Sweet Georgia Brown" (Maceo Pinkard, Kenneth Casey, Ben Bernie) – 2:07
8. "Let's Dance" (Jim Lee) (performed by Tony Sheridan & The Beat Brothers) – 2:35
9. "Ruby Baby" (Jerry Leiber, Mike Stoller) (performed by Tony Sheridan & The Beat Brothers) – 2:53
10. "My Bonnie" (traditional) – 2:43
11. "Nobody's Child" (Mel Foree, Cy Coben) – 3:57
12. "Ready Teddy" (Robert Blackwell, John Marascalco) (performed by Tony Sheridan & The Beat Brothers) – 2:02
13. "Ya Ya" (Parts 1 & 2) (Lee Dorsey, Morgan Robinson) (performed by Tony Sheridan & The Beat Brothers) – 5:10
14. "Kansas City" (Jerry Leiber and Mike Stoller) (performed by Tony Sheridan & The Beat Brothers) – 2:38
