= In the Beginning (Circa 1960) =

Compilation album by the Beatles featuring Tony Sheridan
- Released: 4 May 1970
- Recorded: June 1961 – April 1962, Hamburg, Germany
- Genre: Rock and roll
- Length: 36:35
- Language: English
- Label: Polydor
- Producer: Bert Kaempfert

The Beatles and Tony Sheridan chronology
Ain't She Sweet (1964)	In the Beginning (Circa 1960) (1970)	The Early Tapes of The Beatles (1984)

Professional ratings
Review scores
Source	Rating
AllMusic	2/5 stars

In the Beginning (Circa 1960) is the first American packaging of the 1964 German album by Tony Sheridan and the Beatles, called The Beatles' First!.

== History ==
In the Beginning (Circa 1960) was released by Polydor Records in 1970 (catalogue number 24-4504). It was recorded in Hamburg with The Beatles in 1961 (except for "Sweet Georgia Brown" in 1962) and features Pete Best on the drums. This album, expanded with four more tracks without the Beatles' participation, was originally released as "The Beatles' First !" in Germany in 1964. It was reissued in the United Kingdom in 1967 with the same title – without the exclamation point – then in Canada under the title Very Together in 1969. Previous American releases of this material in 45 rpm form was split in 1964 between MGM Records and Atco Records. Polydor (which eventually absorbed MGM) established its United States branch in 1969 which explains why this package was released much later in The Beatles' history. All of the tracks feature vocals by Sheridan except for "Ain't She Sweet", sung by John Lennon, and the instrumental "Cry for a Shadow". The album was released only four days before Let It Be, The Beatles' final studio album. This is therefore the last Beatles compilation album released whilst the band were still releasing studio albums although the group was already unofficially split.

All subsequent releases of Sheridan/Beatles/Beat Brothers material are simply repackages of the same tracks. In the Beginning (Circa 1960) was also the only Beatles album not owned by EMI though Universal's purchase of Polydor and the Beatles' main catalogue put them under the same ownership. In 1984, this album was released on CD by Polydor under the title "The Early Tapes of the Beatles" with two additional tracks by Sheridan and with both parts of "Ya Ya". Only part one of that track was released on the original LP.

For a time, In the Beginning (Circa 1960) was the only Beatles album available on the iTunes Store until the full catalogue of the Beatles was made available in 2011, although it is not available for purchase any longer.

== Track listing ==
All vocals by Tony Sheridan unless otherwise indicated.

Side one

1. "Ain't She Sweet" (Ager/Yellen) (vocal: John Lennon) – 2:10
2. "Cry for a Shadow" (Harrison/Lennon) (instrumental) – 2:22
3. "Let's Dance" (Lee) (by Tony Sheridan & The Beat Brothers) – 2:32
4. "My Bonnie" (traditional) – 2:06
5. "Take Out Some Insurance on Me, Baby" (Hall/Charles Singleton) – 2:52
6. "What'd I Say" (Charles) (by Tony Sheridan & The Beat Brothers) – 2:37

Side two

7. "Sweet Georgia Brown" (Bernie/Casey/Pinkard) – 2:03
8. "When the Saints Go Marching In" (traditional) – 3:19
9. "Ruby Baby" (Leiber/Stoller) (by Tony Sheridan & The Beat Brothers) – 2:48
10. "Why" (Crompton/Sheridan) – 2:55
11. "Nobody's Child" (Cy Coben/Foree) – 3:52
12. "Ya Ya" (Dorsey/Lewis/Robinson) (by Tony Sheridan & The Beat Brothers) – 2:48

== Charts ==
Chart (1970)	Peak position
US Billboard 200	117
