= Roy Young (musician) =

British rock musician (1934–2018)

- Born: Roy Frederick Young; 20 October 1934; Poplar, London, England
- Died: 27 April 2018 (aged 83) Oxford, England
- Genres: Rock and roll; boogie-woogie; rock
- Instruments: Vocals; piano; keyboards
- Years active: 1958–2018
- Labels: Fontana; Ember; Philips Records; RCA Victor; MCA
- Formerly of: Tony Sheridan; The Beatles; Cliff Bennett and the Rebel Rousers; The Roy Young Band
- Website: royyoung.com

Roy Frederick Young (20 October 1934 – 27 April 2018) was a British rock and roll singer, pianist and keyboard player. He first recorded in the late 1950s before performing in Hamburg with the Beatles. After a stint with Cliff Bennett and the Rebel Rousers, he released several albums with his own band as well as recording with Chuck Berry and David Bowie, among others.

== Biography ==
Young was born in Poplar, East London, and moved with his family to Oxford at the age of seven. He learned to play boogie-woogie piano at home and in snooker clubs, left school at age 14, and joined the Merchant Navy. While in Australia, he saw the film Blackboard Jungle, and, after returning to England, began a career as a professional singer and musician.

In 1958 he auditioned successfully for Jack Good's TV show Oh Boy!, singing and playing piano in the style of Little Richard, and performed regularly on other British TV pop music shows including Drumbeat, where he was backed by the John Barry Seven, and Boy Meets Girls. Billed as Roy "Rock 'em" Young, he recorded his first single, "Just Keep It Up"/"Big Fat Mama" in 1959 for Fontana Records. He released several more singles on the Fontana and Ember labels over the next two years, but they were not commercial successes. Young performed at the 2i's Coffee Bar in Soho, and toured the UK and Ireland with Cliff Richard and the Shadows, among others.

In 1961, he began working at the Top Ten Club in Hamburg, where he played with Tony Sheridan and the Beat Brothers, who briefly included Ringo Starr, and recorded with Sheridan. He then won a contract to play at the rival Star-Club, where he met the Beatles, and began performing with them in spring 1962. According to Young, Brian Epstein offered him a place in the group once they had returned to England and signed a record contract, but Young turned down the offer because he had a contract with the Star-Club.

Young returned to England in 1964 and joined Cliff Bennett and the Rebel Rousers – also managed by Epstein – as their keyboard player and second vocalist, regularly duetting with Bennett on covers of Sam and Dave songs, including "I Take What I Want" and "Hold On, I'm Comin'". The group toured with the Beatles in 1966, and Young featured on their hit version of the Beatles' "Got To Get You Into My Life", produced by Paul McCartney. He continued with the Rebel Rousers until they split up in 1969, and then formed the Roy Young Band, who released two albums, The Roy Young Band (1971) and Mr. Funky (1972); band members included Dennis Elliott, later of Foreigner and Onnie McIntyre, later of the Average White Band and original bassist Paul Simmons (known as Jet) who went to join Mick Underwood in Sammy. The band backed Chuck Berry on tour. in 1971, under his own name, Young recorded the song "Baby, You're Good For Me," written by Andrew Lloyd Webber and Tim Rice, for the Albert Finney film, Gumshoe.

In 1976, Young recorded with David Bowie for the album Low, which was released the following year. He continued to perform with the Roy Young Band in Canada and the US, and also worked with, and managed, Long John Baldry in the 1970s. He toured the US in the 1980s with Ian Hunter and Mick Ronson, and also performed at Star-Club reunion concerts with Tony Sheridan, Howie Casey, Johnny Gustafson and Jimi Magnole

He released an album, Still Young, in 2006, featuring songs written by Dennis Morgan.

Young died at the age of 83 in Oxford on 27 April 2018.

== Discography ==
- 1962: My Bonnie, LP by Tony Sheridan with The Beat Brothers. Young plays prominently throughout this album but does not play on the two Beatle tracks.
- 1963: Twist at the Star Club Hamburg, a live album of "The Star Combo", Young sings and plays on three songs ("Rip It Up", "Keep A-Knocking", and "Margie" and plays on the instrumental "C-Jam Twist"). He also plays on Tony Sheridan's two tracks, "Skinny Minny" and "What'd I Say" (Sheridan is listed under the pseudonym "Dan Sherry"). The Star Combo consisted of Tony Sheridan, Roy Young, Colin "Melander" Crawley, Ricky Barnes and Johnny Watson. There are songs by four other groups on this LP.
- 1964: Ain't She Sweet, LP (side 1) "Sweet Georgia Brown" recorded with the Beatles in 1962. This song appears also, that same year, on the German album The Beatles' First and reissued worldwide in the following years.
- 1966: Meet the Beat (two versions, on 10" and 12" & CD, but with different tracks, sharing only two songs. The 12" features 1966 recordings (with "The Big Six") of "Jailhouse Rock", "Fever", and "Shake, Rattle and Roll")
- 1971: The Roy Young Band, includes Howie Casey.
- 1972: Mr. Funky
- 1996: Tony Sheridan & The Beat Brothers Live and Dangerous (also released as Rock Masters: Feel It). Recordings of "Good Golly Miss Molly" and others. On some of these 1995 live recordings the lead vocal was by Roy Young
- 1996 & 2001: Sheridan in Control (also released as Fab Four Collection) "with The Beat Brothers- Roy Young, Howie Casey" – 1995 recordings of "Johnny B. Goode", "Money", "My Bonnie", "Skinny Minnie"
- 2006: Still Young
- 2012: Roy Rock'Em Young
