= Ain't She Sweet (album) =

Compilation album by the Beatles featuring Tony Sheridan and the Swallows
- Released: 5 October 1964
- Recorded: March–September 1961, Friedrich Ebert Halle, Studio Rahlstedt, Hamburg, West Germany (The Beatles featuring Tony Sheridan); unknown (The Swallows)
- Genre: Rock and roll
- Language: English
- Label: Atco
- Producer: Bert Kaempfert (The Beatles featuring Tony Sheridan tracks)/Unknown (The Swallows tracks)

The Beatles and Tony Sheridan chronology
The Beatles' First! (1964)	Ain't She Sweet (1964)	In the Beginning (Circa 1960) (1970)

Singles from Ain't She Sweet
- 1. "Sweet Georgia Brown / Take Out Some Insurance On Me, Baby" Released: 1 July 1964; 2. "Ain't She Sweet / Nobody's Child" Released: 6 July 1964

Professional ratings
Review scores
Source	Rating
AllMusic	1.5/5 stars

Ain't She Sweet was an American compilation album featuring four tracks recorded in Hamburg by the Beatles in 1961 and 1962. Cover versions of Beatles and British Invasion-era songs recorded by the Swallows complete the tracklist.

== History ==
This compilation album, credited to "The Beatles & other great group sounds from England", was issued by Atco Records in order to cash in on Beatlemania. Produced by Bert Kaempfert, seven songs were recorded by the Beatles in Hamburg in 1961 and 1962, with drummer Pete Best, as a backup band for singer and guitarist Tony Sheridan, although the recording of "Swanee River" was lost. This album's title track, sung by John Lennon, is one of two more songs that were recorded solely by the fledgling British band during these sessions. As Atlantic Records only had rights to four Sheridan/Beatle recordings by Polydor Records, they filled the rest of the album with Beatle and British Invasion cover songs by an obscure band called The Swallows. This material was released in mono (catalogue number 33-169) and stereo (SD 33–169) editions. The label added additional drum overdubs to three of the four Hamburg cuts on top of the original drum tracks with some guitar and harmonica also added; "Nobody's Child" was edited down but the trio instrumentation was not modified.

American drummer Bernard Purdie has long claimed, the first time in a 1978 interview, to have overdubbed or fully re-recorded drum parts on no less than 21 Beatles tracks. He occasionally repeated this claim in the following decades, though there is no mention of it on the musician's official website or in his autobiography, Let the Drums Speak!, and there is no known documentary evidence to support it. Rather, it is likely that Purdie was the studio drummer hired by Atco Records in 1964 to add a punchier sound for the US market, to the songs "Ain't She Sweet", "Take Out Some Insurance On Me, Baby" and "Sweet Georgia Brown". It is also probable that he played on covers of Fab Four songs performed by groups of imitators with names like the Buggs, the Liverpools or the Beetles, created by unscrupulous record companies in order to capitalize on the Beatles' success.

The other four songs featuring the Beatles that were recorded in Hamburg were licensed to MGM Records and had already been released, unadulterated, on an album called The Beatles with Tony Sheridan and Their Guests in February, similarly augmented by other musician's songs. All eight songs, with four others by Tony Sheridan and The Beat Brothers, were compiled that same year by Polydor in West Germany under the title The Beatles' First!, reissued in the UK in 1967 and released in the United States in 1970 under the title In the Beginning (Circa 1960).

== Track listing ==
Songs are written by John Lennon and Paul McCartney unless otherwise indicated. Tracks 2, 3 and 4 performed by Tony Sheridan with the Beatles as a backing band. Tracks 5 to 12 performed by The Swallows.

Side one

1. "Ain't She Sweet" (Milton Ager, Jack Yellen) (performed by The Beatles)
2. "Sweet Georgia Brown" (Ben Bernie, Kenneth Casey, Maceo Pinkard)
3. "Take Out Some Insurance On Me, Baby" (Charles Singleton, Waldenese Hall)
4. "Nobody's Child" (Cy Coben, Mel Foree)
5. "I Wanna Be Your Man"
6. "She Loves You"

Side two

1. "How Do You Do It?" (Mitch Murray)
2. "Please Please Me"
3. "I'll Keep You Satisfied"
4. "I'm Telling You Now" (Freddie Garrity, Mitch Murray)
5. "I Want to Hold Your Hand"
6. "From Me to You"
