= Take Out Some Insurance =

1959 single by Jimmy Reed

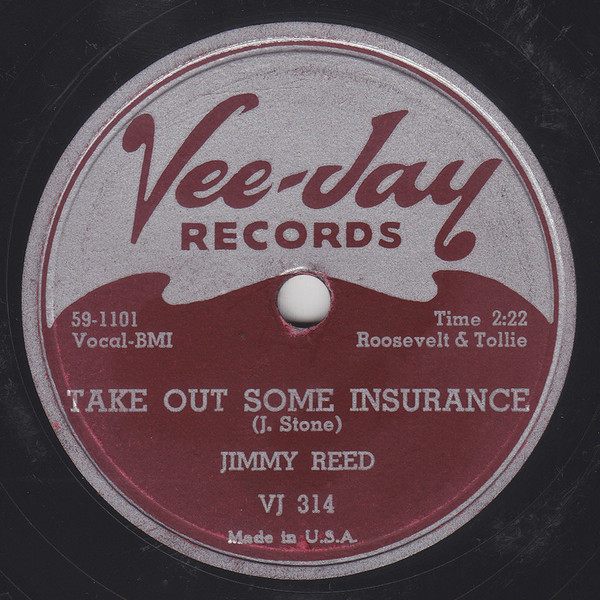
- "Take Out Some Insurance" single

Single by Jimmy Reed

from the album Rockin' with Reed
- B-side: "You Know I Love You"
- Released: April 1959
- Genre: Chicago blues
- Length: 2:22
- Label: Vee-Jay (Cat. no.314)
- Songwriters: Charles Singleton, Waldense Hall (credited to Jesse Stone)

Jimmy Reed singles chronology
"I Told You Baby" (1959)	"Take Out Some Insurance" (1959)	"Going to New York" (1959)

"Take Out Some Insurance" is a blues song released in 1959 by Jimmy Reed written by Charles Singleton and Waldenese Hall but originally credited to Jesse Stone. The copyright registration for the song lists its title as "Take Out Some Insurance on Me, Baby".. Tony Sheridan recorded it with different lyrics in 1961 with The Beatles as his backing band. Misidentified, it was released in Germany in 1964 as "If You Love Me, Baby (Take Out Some Insurance on Me, Baby)" but subsequently as "Take Out Some Insurance on Me, Baby (If You Love Me, Baby)", "Take Out Some Insurance on Me, Baby" or erroneously as "If eou Love Me, Baby" .

== Original recording by Jimmy Reed ==
Riding a string of popular releases, Jimmy Reed recorded this song in early 1959 and it was released as a single in April with the title "Take Out Some Insurance" (Vee Jay 314). It was Billboard's R & B "Best Buy" for the week of May 11. According to this magazine, the song sold well in Louisiana but never made the national charts.

== The Beatles with Tony Sheridan ==
"If You Love Me, Baby"
- B-side label of UK single

Single by The Beatles with Tony Sheridan
- A-side: "Ain't She Sweet"
- Released: 29 May 1964
- Recorded: 24 June 1961
- Studio: Studio Rahlstedt, Hamburg, Germany
- Genre: Rock
- Length: 2:52
- Label: Polydor Records NH 52-317 (UK)
- Songwriters: Charles Singleton, Waldenese Hall
- Producer: Bert Kaempfert

The song was covered by Tony Sheridan and The Beatles in Hamburg while they were playing at the Top Ten Club. On June 22, 1961, they recorded a version of the song. Bert Kaempfert produced the session for Polydor, of which a single with the songs "My Bonnie" and "The Saints" was issued in 1961. The other recordings were not immediately released (Note: Although "Why" and "Cry for a Shadow" were released in France in January 1962 on Sheridan's EP intitled Mister Twist.). After the Beatles became popular, Polydor prepared three more singles of unreleased material, one of which contained their recording of this song (German Polydor NH 52-317, released in mid-April 1964). These songs were also compiled in the album The Beatles' First! that same month. Due to the song's relative obscurity and the fact that the lyrics that Sheridan sang are almost entirely different from Reed's version, the song was mistitled at first as "If You Love Me, Baby" (even being credited as traditional without authorship on early German and British pressings). When the singles were sent to Atlantic Records in the United States for release in that country, apparently someone recognized the song (and copyrighted it to Singleton and Hall). Corrected labels of the June album, The Beatles' First! (German Polydor LPHM 46-432), show the proper title; this album was released in England in 1967, in Canada in 1969 and in the US in 1970.

The American release of the single came slightly later due to Atlantic/Atco's decision to overdub drum (possibly by Bernard Purdie) and guitar (possibly by Cornell Dupree). Due to one brief use of language that was inappropriate for radio in 1964, Atco also edited the song.

=== Release details ===
==== Singles ====
- "Ain't She Sweet" / "If You Love Me, Baby (Take Out Some Insurance on Me, Baby)"

Released 15 April 1964 on Polydor NH 52-317 (Germany).
Released 29 May 1964 on Polydor NH 52-317 (UK).

- "Sweet Georgia Brown" / "Take Out Some Insurance on Me, Baby"

Released 1 June 1964 on Atco 45-6302 (US).

==== Albums ====
These four Polydor albums have the same tracklist.

- The Beatles' First!, released April 1964 in Germany.
- The Beatles' First, released 4 August 1967 in the UK.
- Very Together, released 12 November 1969 in Canada.
- In the Beginning (Circa 1960), released 4 May 1970 in the US.

1964 US album by Atco Records.

- Ain't She Sweet, released 5 October 1964.

1984 CD reissue by Polydor.

- The Early Tapes of the Beatles — The song reverts to its erroneous title "If You Love Me, Baby".

=== Personnel ===
- Tony Sheridan – lead vocals
- George Harrison – lead guitar
- John Lennon – rhythm guitar
- Paul McCartney – bass guitar
- Pete Best – drums
- Karl Hinze – engineer
- Bert Kaempfert – producer

American release:

- Cornell Dupree – guitar overdub
- Bernard Purdie – drum overdub

== Sources ==
Liner notes by Tony Sheridan for "The Beatles' First" (Polydor Records Ltd., UK 236.201)
