= My Bonnie =

Studio album by Tony Sheridan and the Beat Brothers
- Released: June 1962
- Recorded: 22 June & 21 December 1961
- Venue: Friedrich-Ebert-Halle & Musikhalle, Hamburg, West Germany
- Genre: Rock and roll
- Length: 32:08
- Label: Polydor
- Producer: Bert Kaempfert

Tony Sheridan and the Beat Brothers chronology
My Bonnie (1962)	Just a Little Bit (1964)

The Beatles (a.k.a. The Beat Brothers) chronology
My Bonnie (1962)	Please Please Me (1963)

Singles from My Bonnie
- 1. "My Bonnie" Released: 23 October 1961; 2. "You Are My Sunshine" Released: August 1962

My Bonnie is a 1962 album by English rock and roll singer-songwriter and musician Tony Sheridan. Sheridan, then playing in clubs in Hamburg with the Beatles, was discovered by producer Bert Kaempfert and subsequently signed with him to record for Polydor. Sheridan recorded several songs with the Beatles, of which only a single was released in 1961, the titular "My Bonnie" and B-side "The Saints", credited to Tony Sheridan and the Beat Brothers. While both songs are included here, the remaining tracks on this album were credited again to the Beat Brothers but recorded without the Beatles.

Because of the later fame of the Beatles, the eight songs recorded in Hamburg with the then-fledgling group were issued in 1964 as The Beatles' First! and repackaged several times through the years.

== Background and recording ==
In June 1961, Sheridan and the Beatles (then consisting of guitarists John Lennon, George Harrison, Paul McCartney, bassist Stuart Sutcliffe, and drummer Pete Best) were both playing in Hamburg's Top Ten Club, the two frequently performing together. German producer Bert Kaempfert visited the Top Ten on the recommendation of music publisher Alfred Schacht and singer Tommy Kent, and subsequently signed Sheridan and the Beatles to his company Bert Kaempfert Productions.

Kaempfert set a recording date for 22 June at Hamburg's Friedrich-Ebert-Halle. Engineered by Karl Hinze, the session featured Sheridan and the Beatles playing "My Bonnie", "The Saints", "Why", "Nobody's Child", and "Take Out Some Insurance". The Beatles performed "Ain't She Sweet" and an original song, "Beatle Bop" (later titled "Cry for a Shadow"). Sutcliffe attended the session, but did not play, leaving McCartney to play bass. From these sessions, "My Bonnie" was released as a single (with "The Saints" as the B-side) through Polydor Records (who had an exclusive deal with Kaempfert's company) credited to "Tony Sheridan and the Beat Brothers", as the Beatles' contract enabled the record company to use a pseudonym.

A single with "My Bonnie" backed by "The Saints" was released in Germany in October 1961 and was a moderate success, peaking at number 32 in the national chart published in Der Musikmarkt, number 11 in the national jukebox charts, and number four in a local Hamburg chart. Kaempfert and Sheridan conducted another session on 21 December 1961 at Musikhalle Hamburg, without the Beatles. Ten songs were recorded at this session which, along with "My Bonnie" and "The Saints", formed the My Bonnie LP, released 5 January 1962.

== Track listing ==
Side one

1. "My Bonnie" (Traditional, arr. by Tony Sheridan) – 2:43
2. "Skinny Minnie" (Bill Haley, Rusty Keefer, Milt Gabler, Catherine Cafra) – 3:09
3. "Whole Lotta Shakin' Goin On" (Dave Williams, Sunny David) – 2:10
4. "I Know Baby" (Sheridan) – 2:58
5. "You Are My Sunshine" (Jimmie Davis, Charles Mitchell) – 2:29
6. "Ready Teddy" (Robert Blackwell, John Marascalco) – 2:00

Side two

7. "The Saints" (Traditional, arr. by Tony Sheridan) – 3:19
8. "Hallelujah, I Love Her So" (Ray Charles) – 2:11
9. "Let's Twist Again" (Kal Mann, Dave Appell, Peter Buchenkamp) – 2:42
10. "Sweet Georgia Brown" (Ben Bernie, Maceo Pinkard, Kenneth Casey) – 2:30
11. "Swanee River" (Stephen Foster) – 2:56
12. "Top Ten Twist" (Joe Homsen, Mark Bones, Tobby Lüth, Sheridan) – 2:53

2001 Polydor CD bonus tracks

13. "My Bonnie (German intro)" (Traditional, arr. by Sheridan)
14. "Ich Lieb' Dich So" (Doc Pomus, Phil Spector, Lüth)
15. "Der Kiss-Me Song" (Guy Warren, Kurt Schwabach, Erik Wallnau)
16. "Madison Kid" (Charlie Thomas)
17. "Let's Dance" (Jim Lee, Sheridan)
18. "Ruby Baby" (Jerry Leiber, Mike Stoller)
19. "What'd I Say" (Charles)
20. "Veedeboom Slop Slop" (Johnny Sivo)
21. "Let's Slop" (Walter Gleissner, Sivo)
22. "My Bonnie (No intro)" (Traditional, arr. by Sheridan)

== Personnel ==
- Tony Sheridan lead vocals on all tracks, guitar

On "My Bonnie" and "The Saints" :

- John Lennon – rhythm guitar, backing vocals
- Paul McCartney – bass guitar, backing vocals
- George Harrison – lead guitar, backing vocals
- Pete Best – drums

== Bibliography ==
- Lewisohn, Mark (2013). The Beatles: All These Years, Vol. 1: Tune In. Crown Archetype. ISBN 978-1-4000-8305-3.
