= Karen Young (British singer) =

English-born singer

Karen Young (born 13 April 1946 in Sheffield, Yorkshire) is an English-born singer who had a 1969 hit on the UK Singles Chart with "Nobody's Child" (originally by Canadian country singer Hank Snow).

She had other singles released between 1965 and 1971, such as her cover of Cher's #9 hit "You Better Sit Down Kids" (1968), "Allentown Jail" (1969), and "Que Sera Sera"/"One Tin Soldier" (1970), before retiring from the music business in 1974.

== Discography ==
List of singles, with selected chart positions
Year	Title	Peak chart positions	
Year	Title	UK	AUS
1966	"I'm Yours, You're Mine"	–	–
1967	"The Hurt Won't Go Away"	–	–
1968	"You Better Sit Down, Kids"	–	–
1969	"Nobody's Child"	6	23
1970	"One Tin Soldier"	—	72
