= Ya Ya (Lee Dorsey song) =

1961 single by Lee Dorsey

Single by Lee Dorsey

from the album Ya Ya
- B-side: "Give Me You"
- Released: July 29, 1961
- Genre: Soul, rock and roll
- Length: 2:27
- Label: Fury
- Songwriters: Lee Dorsey, Clarence Lewis, Morgan Robinson, and Morris Levy

Lee Dorsey singles chronology
"Lover of Love" (1961)	"Ya Ya" (1961)	"Rock" (1961)

"Ya Ya" is a song by Lee Dorsey. The song was written by Dorsey, C. L. Blast, Bobby Robinson, and Morris Levy. Levy's participation in the writing has been called into question; the Flashback release of the single lists only Dorsey and Blast as writers, as do the liner notes to the American Graffiti soundtrack.

== Background ==
The song was inspired by a children's nursery rhyme, and includes session guitar player Wild Jimmy Spruill on it. The song first appeared on Dorsey's titular album when it was released on February 7, 1961. It was released as a single five months later on July 29, 1961.

== Chart performance ==
The song reached number seven on the Billboard Hot 100 and number one on the R&B singles chart in 1961.

== Album appearances ==
In addition to the 1973 American Graffiti soundtrack album (MCA2-8001), the song appears on the 1962 compilation Alan Freed's Top 15 (End LP 315).

== Cover versions ==
=== Beatles connection ===
According to author Mark Lewisohn in The Complete Beatles Chronicles (p. 365), the Beatles regularly performed "Ya Ya", live from 1961 to 1962 in Hamburg, Liverpool and elsewhere. John Lennon was always the lead vocalist on this number but no recorded version is known to exist.

Ya Ya

EP by Tony Sheridan & The Beat Brothers
- Released: October 1962
- Recorded: 1962, Hamburg
- Genre: Rock and roll
- Label: Polydor
- Producer: Bert Kaempfert

However, Tony Sheridan, the Beatles' close associate, recorded a live version of the song for Polydor Records which was released in October 1962 on the A-side of a German extended play. (Note: According to Bill Harry in his liner notes for 1984's The Early Tapes of the Beatles, the musicians involved are Tony Sheridan (guitar and vocals), Rikki Barnes (saxophone), Roy Young (piano), Peter Wharton (bass) and Johnny Watson (drums).) This 45 rpm is credited to Tony Sheridan & "The Beat Brothers" who are often wrongly believed to be the Beatles. But the fledgling British group had no involvement in recording this track although "Sweet Georgia Brown", included on this disc, is indeed recorded by them.

==== Track listing for Ya Ya by Tony Sheridan & The Beat Brothers ====
7-inch EP Polydor – 21 485 (1962, Germany.)

A1. / A2. "Ya Ya Part 1 & 2"
B1. "Sweet Georgia Brown"
B2. "Skinny Minny" (sic)

In 1964, "Ya Ya" (Part 1) was included as filler on the German compilation album "The Beatles' First!" and the complete recording can be heard on The Early Tapes of the Beatles, the 1984 CD reissue of this album.

In 1974, John Lennon included a snippet of the song on the album Walls and Bridges with himself on vocals and piano, credited as "Dad", and his 11 year old son Julian on the snare drum. Lennon covered the song fully on his 1975 album Rock 'n' Roll.

=== Other covers ===
- In 1966, Tommy James and the Shondells released a version as the B-side to their song "It's Only Love"
- Mouse and the Traps recorded "Ya Ya" as the B-side of their 1967 single "Cryin' Inside".
- The Hombres included a cover on their only album Let It Out (Let It All Hang Out), in 1968.
- George Faith included a medley of Midnight Hour/Ya Ya on his first album Super 8 / To Be A Lover, in 1978.
- Trio recorded and released it on their 1981 eponymous first album and their live album Live im Frühjahr 82.
- Lee Michaels covered the song on his 1971 album 5th.
- Ike & Tina Turner covered the song in the early 1970s but their version was not released until 2004 on the album His Woman, Her Man: The Ike Turner Diaries.
- Steve Miller covered the song on his 1988 album Born 2 B Blue.

=== Johnny Hallyday (French version) ===
"Ya ya twist"

Single by Johnny Hallyday

from the album Retiens la nuit
- Released: February 2, 1962
- Recorded: November 1961
- Genre: Rock and roll
- Length: 2:27
- Label: Philips
- Songwriters: French adaptation: Lucien Morisse, Georges Aber

Johnny Hallyday singles chronology
"Viens danser le twist" (1961)	"Retiens la nuit" / "Ya ya twist" (1962)	"Serre la main d'un fou" (1962)

French singer Johnny Hallyday covered the song in French. His version, titled "Ya ya twist", reached No. 1 in Wallonia (the French speaking part of Belgium) in 1962.

==== Track listing ====
7-inch EP Philips 432.739 BE (1962, France etc.)

A1. "Retiens la nuit" (2:54)
A2. "Sam'di soir" (3:00)
B1. "Ya ya twist" (2:27)
B2. "La faute au twist" (1:50)

==== Charts ====
Chart (1962)	Peak position
Belgium (Ultratop 50 Wallonia)	1

=== Other French language covers ===
- Petula Clark recorded the song (released in February 1962, #1) almost simultaneously to Hallyday's version.
- Malika et les Golden Stars released it on a Philips record in January 1963.
- Sylvie Vartan (Hallyday's ex-wife) recorded a cover for her album Nouvelle Vague in 2007
- In 1964, Joel Denis covered the song in Québec as "Yaya", which was rerecorded in 1994 by Mitsou.

=== Covers in other languages ===
- In 1962, Dalida covered the song in German under the title "Ya Ya Twist".
- In 1980 a Norwegian retrorock band Vazelina Bilopphøggers released the song as "Gi meg fri i kveld".
- Toni Montano covered it on his first album "Tonny Montano" as "Svi se sada njišu i ubrzano dišu" in 1985
- Goran Bregović covered the song as "Ringe ringe raja" in his soundtrack for the 1995 film Underground.
