= Retiens la nuit =

1961 single by Johnny Hallyday

Single by Johnny Hallyday

from the album Salut les copains
- Language: French
- English title: Hold back the night
- Released: 16 December 1961
- Recorded: November 1961
- Length: 2:57
- Label: Philips
- Composer: Georges Garvarentz
- Lyricist: Charles Aznavour
- Producer: Lee Hallyday

Johnny Hallyday singles chronology
"Viens danser le twist" (1961)	"Retiens la nuit" / "Ya ya twist" (1961)	"I Got a Woman" (1962)

EP

Music video
- "Retiens la nuit" (French TV, 1961) on YouTube

"Retiens la nuit" ("Hold back the night") is a song by French singer Johnny Hallyday from his 1961 studio album Salut les copains. It was also released as an EP in February 1962 and as a single two months prior. The song was also featured in the 1962 French comedy-drama anthology film "Les parisiennes", which starred Hallyday.

== Composition and writing ==
The song was written by Charles Aznavour and composed by Georges Garvarentz.

== Commercial performance ==
In France the single spent nine weeks at No. 1 on the singles sales chart (in March–May 1962).

== Track listing ==
7-inch single Philips 372 946 PF (1961, France etc.)

A. "Retiens la nuit"
B. "Sam'di soir"

7-inch EP Philips 432.739 BE (1962, France etc.)

A1. "Retiens la nuit" (2:54)
A2. "Sam'di soir" (3:00)
B1. "Ya ya twist" (2:27)
B2. "La faute au twist" (1:50)

== Cover versions ==
The song has been covered by Charles Aznavour.
