= Brother Bones =

American musician and percussionist (1902-1974)

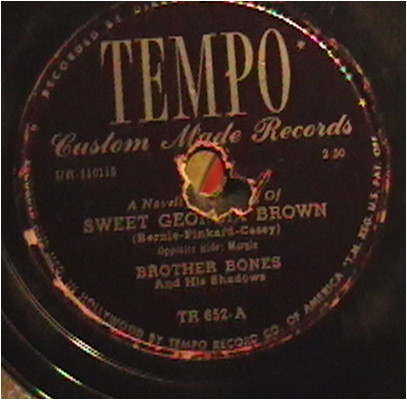
"Sweet Georgia Brown" on the Tempo (US) label, recorded by Brother Bones and His Shadows

Freeman Davis (October 4, 1902 – June 14, 1974) was an American whistling and bone playing recording artist best known by his stage names "Brother Bones" and "Whistling Sam".

== Early life ==
Freeman Davis was born in Montgomery, Alabama.

== Career ==
Davis is best remembered for his 1949 recording (as Brother Bones and His Shadows) of the 1925 standard "Sweet Georgia Brown". The recording became nationally famous after its adoption as the theme song of the Harlem Globetrotters basketball team in 1952. Notably, the bass line for this track uses the Novachord, a very early electronic synthesizer more prominently featured on the B side of the record. Despite the success of this record, Davis himself remained relatively unknown.

== Death ==
Davis died in June 1974, in Long Beach, California, at the age of 71. Davis was buried in Woodlawn Memorial Park, Compton, Los Angeles County, California.

== Popular culture ==
His song, "Black Eyed Susan Brown", was sampled in the De La Soul song, "Pease Porridge", on their 1991 album, De La Soul Is Dead.

"Sweet Georgia Brown" was used in the Vauxhall Meriva television advertisement in the UK.
