= The Buggs =

The Buggs was the name of two short-lived soundalike bands of the mid-1960s inspired by The Beatles craze. One group (whose actual name was the Coachmen V) had a full album on Coronet Records, and the other group had a single on Soma Records.

== The band with the album ==
The album credited to the Buggs, The Beetle Beat, was released in February 1964. It consisted of covers of Beatles songs ("I Want To Hold Your Hand", "She Loves You") with some originals, many written by Lor Crane & Joan Kingsbury ("Big Ben Hop (Sassy Sue)", "Liverpool Drag (Why Won't You Leave That Man?)", "Teddy Boy Stomp ("I'll Never Never Never Leave You)", "Mersey Mercy (You Got Me Bugged)", "Swingin' Thames (That's For Sure)", "London Town Swing (Why Can't You Love the Boy Who Loves You)", "East End (Since You Broke My Heart)", and a cover version of "Just One Look" (as "Soho Mash").

Fraudulent assertions of English origins featured prominently on the album cover, while the harsh unidirectional lighting on a black-and-white image mimicked the cover of With the Beatles. Models shown are not the band members.

Despite the cover displaying "The original Liverpool sound" and claiming to have been "Recorded in England", The Buggs hailed from New Jersey and the album was actually recorded in the New York/New Jersey area.

The Buggs were never a real band; rather, the album was recorded by a group named the Coachmen V from Bergen County, New Jersey, under the impression that it would be released under that name. The album was produced by Goldie Goldman, who hired a songwriter to write the original tracks. Some rehearsing of the material was done in Nyack, New York at Scotty's Bar, after which the album was recorded. Band personnel included Bill Omolski on bass, Gary Wright (later to have a successful solo career with hits such as "Dream Weaver") on organ and vocals, Frank Zillitto (1942 – December 2017) on guitar, Steve Bogue on drums, and either Eddie Brick or Jimmy Carrol on lead vocals. Brick and Carrol both worked as lead vocalist for the Coachman V at different times, and it is not known which one sang on the Buggs album. Studio musician Trade Martin also played on album.

Band members were surprised (and unhappy) when they discovered that album had been released under a different band name, under false pretenses, and with models representing the band members. No royalties were ever paid, and The Buggs ceased to exist. In 1966, Coronet released Boots a Go-Go (Coronet, CX-212-A: 1966) repackaging the same Beetle Beat album from two years earlier, now with a go-go music storyline on the back cover and a picture of a go-go dancer on the front and back covers. According to the back cover, the Buggs' "go go sound" was "grown up rock 'n' roll" played at discotheques and on Hullaballoo. Cleverly, no song titles were featured on the album's front or back cover so that unaware buyers would not know that this was exactly the same Buggs' music from their previous and, technically, only release. As a result, the record's label did not reference the "Boots a Go-Go" title as the original unsold Beetle Beat vinyl was simply repurposed inside.

Their influence may have been limited, but Devo's Mark Mothersbaugh said that Beetle Beat was his first album purchase, thinking it was a Beatles album. Mothersbaugh said, "One track pissed me off so much it eventually inspired the nasty Devo song, 'U Got Me Bugged'." In 2009, reissue label Master Classics brought Beetle Beat to iTunes Store and other online music services, including Spotify.

=== Discography ===
- The Beetle Beat (1964, Coronet Records (UK/US), CX-212 (LP)
- Coral 62398 45 rpm single, "You Got Me Bugged"/"Sassy Sue", The Pacers, 1964. Also featured on The Beetle Beat album.

=== Compilations ===
- At The Hop (Coronet LP, CX-244: 1964) and Starring Frankie Valli (on Coronet's Premier label PS-9052: 1964) contain a few Buggs songs from Beetle Beat;
- Discotheque (Coronet LP, CX-252: 1964) featured five songs from Beetle Beat. Also released in a stereophonic version, with label number CXS-252, as well as in Germany, with a band name of The Crossbrakers (Vogue Schallplatten, ZS 10030 PR: Year unknown).
- Starring the Young Rascals (Coronet LP, CX-283: 1966) featured two existing Buggs' songs from Beetle Beat under new titles.
- Boots a Go-Go (Coronet LP, CX-212-A: 1966) repackaged the same Beetle Beat album as a go-go album.
- The English Sound (Premier LP, PS-9016: 1967) featured five Buggs songs for all of Side B, this time crediting them as The Submarine Spitfires.

== The band with the single ==
In 1964, a single credited to The Buggs was released on Soma Records. This was a one-off by a band led by Omaha musician Andy Anderson (either Andy and the Manhattans, Andy and the Live Wires, or perhaps another (Anderson frequently changed the names of his bands)), based on a comedy routine that Anderson's band worked into their concerts. The Buggs were not an actual band. The single was recorded at Kay Bank Studios in Minneapolis and released by local record company Soma Records. The drummer may have been Bobby Jones, later of Aorta.

The single, "Buggs Vs. Beetles (I Want To Hold Your Hand)", is not a straight cover, but is instead a parody mocking the Beatles. The cover sleeve features Anderson and bandmates wielding various insect-eradication devices. The B-Side, "She Loves Me", is a straight cover of "She Loves You" despite the title change.

=== Discography ===
- Soma 1413 45 rpm single, with picture sleeve. A side: Buggs Vs. Beetles (I Want To Hold Your Hand); B side: She Loves Me (1964).

=== Compilations ===
- Better Than The Beatles: 26 Tunes That Failed to Oust the Fab Four From The Charts (Knight (LP)) includes "Buggs vs. Beetles (I Want to Hold Your Hand)"

== Other Buggs ==
A different American band named the Buggs released a single in 1966. There is a 21st century German band named the Buggs.
