= My Bonnie Lies over the Ocean =

Traditional Scottish folk song

My Bonnie Lies Over the Ocean
- Genre: Scottish folk music
- MIDI rendition 1901 recording By the Haydn Quartet

"My Bonnie Lies Over the Ocean", or simply "My Bonnie", is a traditional folk song and children’s song that is popular in Western culture. It is listed in Roud Folk Song Index as No. 1422. The song has been recorded by numerous artists since the beginning of the 20th century, and many parody versions also exist.

The best known recording of the song may be a rock and roll version titled "My Bonnie" by Tony Sheridan and the Beatles, recorded in the first-ever commercial recording session that featured the Beatles. The resulting single is generally regarded as the Beatles' first single.

== History ==
The song's origin is uncertain, but one hypothesis holds that it was originally written about Charles Edward Stuart, known as "Bonnie Prince Charlie". After Charles's defeat at the Battle of Culloden in 1746 and his subsequent exile, his Jacobite supporters could have sung the song or one like it in support of him, with the gender-neutral term "Bonnie" allowing it to be disguised as a song of lost love.

In 1881, under the duo of pseudonyms H. J. Fuller and J. T. Wood, Charles E. Pratt published sheet music for "Bring Back My Bonnie to Me". Theodore Raph, in his 1964 book American Song Treasury: 100 Favorites, writes people were requesting the song at sheet music stores in the 1870, and Pratt was convinced to publish a version of it under the pseudonyms. The song became a big hit, especially popular with college singing groups, but also for any group singing.

Another song from the English tradition titled "My Barney Lies over the Ocean" has a slightly different melody, and it is said to be an antecedent of "My Bonnie". In the liner notes for the 1975 album "For Pence and Spicy Ale" for which the English traditional singing group the Watersons recorded a version, the musicologist A. L. Lloyd says about "My Barney": "A stage song favoured by Irish comedians from the 1860s on. During the 1880s, apparently on American university campuses, close harmony groups remade it into the better-known—and even more preposterous—'My Bonny Lies over the Ocean'. Watersons had this from Bob Davenport who learnt it from a Frank Quinn 78."

== Early recordings ==
Many early recordings were recorded under the title "Bring Back My Bonnie to Me", such as the recording released by the vocal group Haydn Quartet in 1901. Others with the same title include an instrumental version by the Taylor Trio (1916), and a vocal version by Alma Gluck and Orpheus Quartet (1918). The song was recorded in many different musical styles; for example, the country group the Leake County Revelers recorded a country version in 1927 with the title "My Bonnie Lies over the Ocean", a big band version was recorded by Glen Gray and the Casa Loma Orchestra in 1938, and a calypso-style version by Ella Fitzgerald with Bobby Orton's Teen-Aces in 1952, released as the flip side of "Trying".

In 1919, Billy Murray released a different song titled "My Barney Lies Over the Ocean (Just the Way He Lied to Me)", where a few modified lines of "My Bonnie" was used as the chorus. It was sung from a female perspective where she suspected her significant other (the "Barney" of the title) of cheating and lying.

There have been a handful of field recordings of traditional versions. Birmingham resident Cecilia Costello was recorded singing a version by Peter Kennedy in 1951, whilst the "East Grinstead Old People's Club" of East Grinstead, Sussex, England, sang a version to Ken Stubbs in 1960, which can be heard online via the Vaughan Williams Memorial Library website. Traditional versions of the song have also been recorded in the United States and Canada.

== Text and melody ==
Being a folk song, there are many variants, but one common version goes:

My Bonnie lies over the ocean.
My Bonnie lies over the sea.
My Bonnie lies over the ocean.
Oh, bring back my Bonnie to me.

[Chorus]
Bring back, bring back,
Oh, bring back my Bonnie to me, to me.
Bring back, bring back,
Oh, bring back my Bonnie to me.

Oh, blow ye winds over the ocean.
Oh, blow ye winds over the sea.
Oh, blow ye winds over the ocean,
And bring back my Bonnie to me.

[Repeat chorus]

Last night as I lay on my pillow,
Last night as I lay on my bed,
Last night as I lay on my pillow,
I dreamt that my Bonnie was dead.

[Repeat chorus]

The winds have blown over the ocean.
The winds have blown over the sea.
The winds have blown over the ocean,
And brought back my Bonnie to me.

[Repeat chorus]

== Variations and parodies ==
The structure and tune of the song made it a suitable vehicle for parody, and numerous variations and parodies of the song have been created over the years. Some of these may be sung as children songs, and many have become common campfire song for organizations such as the Boy Scouts. These campfire versions are occasionally accompanied by interactive movements, such as sitting down or standing up every time a word that begins with the letter "b" is sung. Two examples are given below, the first may be sung as additional verses or variations for the song, the second a song titled "Oh God, How the Money Rolls In" sung to the tune of "My Bonnie":

My Bonnie (variations)
Last night as I lay on my pillow,
Last night as I lay on my bed,
I stuck my feet out of the window,
In the morning the neighbors were dead.

[Chorus]
Bring back, bring back, oh bring back my neighbor to me, to me
Bring back, bring back, oh bring back my neighbor to me

My Bonnie leaned over the gas tank,
The height of its contents to see,
I lighted a match to assist her,
O Bring back my Bonnie to me.

[Chorus]

My breakfast lies over the ocean,
My luncheon lies over the rail.
My supper lies in a commotion.
Won't somebody bring me a pail?

[Chorus]

My God, How the Money Rolls In
My mother makes beer in the bathtub,
My father makes synthetic gin,
My sister makes fudge for a quarter,
My God, how the money rolls in.

[Chorus]
Rolls in, rolls in, my God, how the money rolls in, rolls in,
Rolls in, rolls in, my God, how the money rolls in.

My mother, she drowned in the bathtub,
My father, he died from his gin,
My sister, she choked on her chocolate,
My God, what a jam I am in.

[Repeat chorus]

I tried making beer in the bathtub,
I tried making synthetic gin,
I tried making fudge for a living,
Now look at the shape that I'm in.

[Repeat chorus]

Another variant popular in the Scouting movement goes under titles such as "My Father's a Lavatory Cleaner", "Shine Your Buttons with Brasso", and "Sweet Violets". The exact history is unknown, but the references to the cleaning material Brasso, its price of three ha'pence (three halfpennies), and its availability from Woolworths, suggest a possible origin in English music hall, or among British or ANZAC troops, in the early 20th century. It is Roud folk song index no. 10232.

== Tony Sheridan and the Beatles ==
"My Bonnie"
- Side A of the UK single

Single by Tony Sheridan and the Beat Brothers

from the album My Bonnie
- B-side: "The Saints (When the Saints Go Marching In)"
- Released: 23 October 1961 (Germany); 5 January 1962 (UK); 11 April 1962 (US)
- Recorded: 22 June 1961
- Venue: Friedrich-Ebert-Halle, Hamburg, Germany
- Genre: Rock and roll
- Length: 2:42
- Label: Polydor (Germany, UK); Decca (USA)
- Songwriters: Traditional, arranged by Tony Sheridan
- Producer: Bert Kaempfert

Tony Sheridan and the Beat Brothers singles chronology
"My Bonnie" (1961)	"You Are My Sunshine" (8/1962)

The Beatles UK singles chronology
"My Bonnie" (1/1962)	"Love Me Do" (10/1962)

The Beatles US singles chronology
"I Want to Hold Your Hand" (1963)	"My Bonnie" (1964)	"Twist and Shout" (1964)

Audio video
- "My Bonnie" on YouTube

A rock n' roll arrangement of the song was recorded by Tony Sheridan and the Beatles. It was titled "My Bonnie", and subtitled "Mein Herz ist bei dir nur" ("My Heart is with You Only") in its German language version. It was recorded with a German and an English intro. The band was credited as the Beat Brothers in its original release; their name was changed because the German producer wanted to avoid association with the similar sounding German slang "pidels" (pronounced "peedles" meaning "little willies"), and the "Beat Brothers" was thought more understandable to the German audience.

=== Recording ===
Tony Sheridan and the Beatles (with Pete Best on drums) were signed by bandleader Bert Kaempfert to Polydor, and they recorded a number of songs including "My Bonnie" in their first recording session on 22 June 1961 at the Friedrich-Ebert-Halle in Hamburg, West Germany. These songs were the Beatles' first commercial recordings. Kaempfert produced the song, assisted by sound engineer Karl Hinze. "My Bonnie" was said to have been chosen because it was a song known to the Germans.

Tony Sheridan sang lead on the song, starting with a slow Elvis Presley-style introduction. The Beatles were the backing band; Paul McCartney provided vocal harmony and shouts, Best on drums provided a constant "2-and, 4" beat on the faster part of the song, and George Harrison on guitar notably on the bridge. Sheridan himself played the guitar solo. This is how Sheridan describes his arrangement of the song: "The [slow] introduction was in A, now we did a very innovative thing, we went in to C to Rock and roll." He described their preparation for their recording session of My Bonnie, in these words:

Paul, I knew he was a natural bass player, so I said to Paul, "Can you do the second part of my solo? Can you play just C and nothing else? The low C? You just need to stay on the same note." And he did. If you listen to My Bonnie, in the second part of the solo, you will hear Paul doing exactly that, which shows he was a great bass player. He still is.

=== Personnel ===
- Tony Sheridan – lead vocals, guitar solo
- John Lennon – rhythm guitar, backing vocals
- Paul McCartney – bass, backing vocals
- George Harrison – lead guitar, backing vocals
- Pete Best – drums

=== Release and response ===
"My Bonnie" was first released as a single in October 1961 in West Germany, with "The Saints (When the Saints Go Marching In)" its B-side. According to McCartney in 1962, it reached top 5 on the German hit parade.

The single is said to have been instrumental in bringing the Beatles to the attention of Brian Epstein (even though Epstein was likely to have been aware of the group's existence before then), when a customer requested the record at his music store NEMS in Liverpool. Epstein subsequently went to see the Beatles at The Cavern Club and became their manager. Brian Epstein placed a large order of the single for NEMS, which persuaded the German label to release the single on 5 January 1962 in the UK, this time credited to Tony Sheridan and the Beatles. However, it did not chart in the UK in 1962, but charted in 1963 at No. 48 after the Beatles became popular. In July 1963, Polydor released "My Bonnie" as an EP in the UK in order to capitalise on the success of the Beatles. The single was also released in the United States and again reissued at the height of Beatlemania, this time with the Beatles credited as the lead artist, peaking at No. 26 spot on the BillboardHot 100.

John Lennon later expressed his dislike for the Beatles' recording with Sheridan, as he said: "It's just Tony Sheridan singing, with us banging in the background. It's terrible. It could be anybody." George Harrison, however, was enthusiastic about the initial release of their recording, and said that he "didn't stop playing it for days". For a brief period, the Beatles incorporated the song into their live sets, with Lennon performing the lead vocal.

Both "My Bonnie" and "The Saints" were included on Sheridan's My Bonnie album. Sheridan's first version of "Sweet Georgia Brown" was also recorded with the Beatles and issued on an E.P. in 1962. This was the third and last song with the Beatles to be credited to the Beat Brothers. When the Beatles gained fame, all eight recordings made by the Beatles in Hamburg in 1961 and 1962 were compiled on the German album The Beatles' First! in 1964 and issued elsewhere in subsequent years. "My Bonnie", along with "Ain't She Sweet" and "Cry for a Shadow", appears on the 1995 compilation album Anthology 1. On Anthology 1, the opening of the song is partially obscured by an audio clip of Paul McCartney speaking about the song's recording.

=== Weekly charts ===
Chart (1961–1964)	Peak position
Australia (Kent Music Report)	29
Denmark (Salgshitlisterne Top 20)	8
Finland (The Official Finnish Charts)	17
Sweden (Kvällstoppen)	19
UK Singles (Official Charts)	48
US Billboard Hot 100	26
West Germany (GfK)	32

== Other versions ==
- Duane Eddy and the Rebels recorded an instrumental version titled "Bonnie Come Back", which reached No. 26 on the Billboard Hot 100, No. 15 on the CHUM Chart in Canada, and No. 12 on the UK chart in 1960.
- Ray Charles released a R&B version titled "My Bonnie" in 1958. It was included in his 1959 album What’d I Say.
- Pete Seeger sang a song titled "My Children Are Seven in Number" based on the tune of "My Bonnie" to promote the labour movement and show solidarity with striking workers. The song was included in his 1956 album American Industrial Ballads as well as other compilations.

== In modern culture ==
- The Fleischer brothers filmed this song in DeForest Phonofilm, part of their Song Car-Tunes series, released 15 September 1925, and notable as the first film to use the "follow the bouncing ball" technique.
- My Bunny Lies over the Sea, a short Bugs Bunny cartoon film whose title parodies the song, was released by Warner Brothers in 1948.
- On December 20, 2011, JibJab released a video about the year 2011 in review with a song called "2011, Buh-Bye", to the tune of the title song.
- In 1940, refugees aboard the Dunera ship "learned from their British warders" this song's tune and, in response to maltreatment, including to their luggage, they composed and sang "regularly on board the ship": "My luggage went into the ocean, My luggage went into the sea, My luggage was thrown in the ocean, Oh, bring back my luggage to me!"
