= The Beatles' First =

The Beatles' First!
- 1967 British cover

Compilation album by the Beatles featuring Tony Sheridan
- Released: April 1964
- Recorded: June 1961 and May 1962, Hamburg, West Germany
- Genre: Rock and roll
- Language: English, German ("My Bonnie")
- Label: Polydor
- Producer: Bert Kaempfert

The Beatles featuring Tony Sheridan chronology
The Beatles with Tony Sheridan and Their Guests (1964)	The Beatles' First (1964)	Ain't She Sweet (1964)

Deluxe Edition
- 2004 Compact Disc re-released from Universal using a graphic design similar to the original German sleeve.

Professional ratings
Review scores
Source	Rating
Allmusic	3.5/5 stars

The Beatles' First! (subtitled Recorded in Hamburg 1961 - Featuring Tony Sheridan and Guests) is a German compilation album of songs recorded in Hamburg in 1961 and 1962 by Tony Sheridan with the Beatles as his backing group. It was originally released in 1964 in West Germany, then issued in 1967 in England, 1969 in Canada, as Very Together and finally in the United States in 1970, titled In the Beginning (Circa 1960).

== Recording history ==
On 22 June 1961, composer and musical director Bert Kaempfert produced the Beatles' first professional recording session backing English singer and guitarist Tony Sheridan for the German label Polydor. Performed in the auditorium of Friedrich-Ebert-Hall, a high school in the borough of Hamburg-Harburg often used as a studio, Paul McCartney is on bass, John Lennon on rhythm guitar, Pete Best on drums (which only includes snare, hi-hats and cymbal) with George Harrison and Sheridan sharing lead guitar parts. McCartney, Lennon and Harrison also perform backing vocals. The session, which possibly ended the next day, saw the recording of "My Bonnie" and "The Saints" (released as a single that same year and on an LP called My Bonnie in January 1962, all credited to Tony Sheridan and the Beat Brothers), "Why", an original song by Sheridan, and the covers "Nobody's Child" by Hank Snow and "If You Love Me, Baby (Take Out Some Insurance On Me, Baby)" by Jimmy Reed but the latter with different lyrics. Two other tracks on which Sheridan does not appear, the instrumental "Beatle Bop" (later renamed "Cry for a Shadow"), credited to Harrison - Lennon, and the standard "Ain't She Sweet", sung by Lennon, are also recorded. These five songs will remain unreleased for nearly three years. (Note: Although "Why" and "Cry for a Shadow" were released in France in January 1962 on Sheridan's EP intitled Mister Twist.)

"Sweet Georgia Brown" and "Swanee River" were recorded at Rahlstedt studio in Hamburg on 24 May 1962, during a second session designed to end the Beatles recording contract with Polydor in order to give free rein to their new manager, Brian Epstein. "Sweet Georgia Brown" was released in October 1962 on a German E.P. entitled "Ya Ya" and credited again to Tony Sheridan and the Beat Brothers but the recording of the second song was lost.

== Release history ==
The Beatles' First! was released in April 1964 by German Polydor (Polydor 20328) and was available in the UK as an import. Four songs by Sheridan with other musicians were added to the eight recorded by the Beatles. The track "Take Out Some Insurance on Me, Baby" was mistitled "If You Love Me, Baby". The following month, Polydor France issued a 10 inch LP, simply entitled Les Beatles, that compiled exclusively the Beatles' Hamburg recordings. On 4 August 1967, Polydor officially released The Beatles' First in the UK (catalogue number 236-201), but with a sleeve designed by Barry Zaid which omits the exclamation mark.

In New Zealand, the album was released three times: firstly in 1966 (cat. no. 237632, as above), secondly in the early 1970s, titled The Beatles in Hamburg (cat. no. NZ SP 125) and in 1977 as a double LP (cat. no. 118). In Canada, the album was released in 1969 with the title Very Together (Polydor 242.008), while the US issued the album the following year under the title In the Beginning (Circa 1960) (Polydor 24-4504) with "Take Out Some Insurance on Me, Baby" correctly named.

All subsequent releases of the Tony Sheridan/Beatles/Beat Brothers recordings are repackages of the same tracks.

The album was released on CD in 1984 under the title The Early Tapes of The Beatles which included two more bonus tracks by Sheridan and the complete recordings of the songs "Ya Ya" and "My Bonnie", the latter with its slow intro sung in English. It was expanded to a double-CD set subtitled Deluxe Edition, with two tracks replacing the previous edition's bonus tracks, issued by Universal Music on 12 June 2004. The main tracks are in stereo on the first CD and in mono on the second CD. This release used similar artwork from the original German sleeve.

The eight tracks recorded by the Beatles were compiled, in all their published variations, in the double album "Beatles Bop – Hamburg Days" in 2001 by Bear Family Records and ten years later by Time Life with the title The Beatles With Tony Sheridan – F1rst Recordings: 50th Anniversary Edition.

== Track listing ==
=== Original LP ===
All vocals by Tony Sheridan unless otherwise indicated. All songs recorded with the Beatles unless noted The Beat Brothers and marked by an asterisk.

Side one

1. "Ain't She Sweet" (Ager/Yellen) (vocal: John Lennon) – 2:10
2. "Cry for a Shadow" (George Harrison/John Lennon) (instrumental) – 2:22
3. * "Let's Dance" (Lee) (The Beat Brothers) – 2:32
4. "My Bonnie" (traditional) – 2:06
5. "If You Love Me, Baby (Take Out Some Insurance On Me, Baby)" (Hall/Charles Singleton) – 2:52
6. * "What'd I Say" (Ray Charles) (The Beat Brothers) – 2:37

Side two

7. "Sweet Georgia Brown" (Bernie, Casey, Pinkard) – 2:03
8. "The Saints" (traditional) – 3:19
9. * "Ruby Baby" (Jerry Leiber and Mike Stoller) (The Beat Brothers) – 2:48
10. "Why" (Bill Crompton & Tony Sheridan) – 2:55
11. "Nobody's Child" (Cy Coben, Mel Foree) – 3:52
12. * "Ya Ya" (Dorsey/Robinson) (The Beat Brothers) – 2:48

=== The Early Tapes of the Beatles ===
1. Ain't She Sweet – 2:12
2. Cry for a Shadow – 2:23
3. When the Saints Go Marching In – 3:18
4. Why – 2:58
5. If You Love Me, Baby – 2:53
6. * What'd I Say – 2:39
7. Sweet Georgia Brown – 2:05
8. * Let's Dance – 2:33
9. * Ruby Baby – 2:52
10. My Bonnie – 2:42
11. Nobody's Child – 3:55
12. * Ready Teddy (John Marascalco and Robert Blackwell) – 2:01 (added track by The Beat Brothers)
13. * Ya Ya – 5:08 (complete recording)
14. * Kansas City (Jerry Leiber and Mike Stoller) – 2:38 (added track by The Beat Brothers)

=== Deluxe Edition ===
Disc one – Stereo

1. "Ain't She Sweet"
2. "Cry for a Shadow"
3. * "Let's Dance"
4. "My Bonnie"
5. "Take Some Insurance On Me, Baby"
6. * "What'd I Say"
7. "Sweet Georgia Brown"
8. "The Saints"
9. * "Ruby Baby"
10. "Why"
11. "Nobody's Child"
12. * "Ya Ya"
13. "My Bonnie" (English intro)
14. "My Bonnie" (German intro)

Disc two – Mono

1. "Ain't She Sweet"
2. "Cry for a Shadow"
3. *"Let's Dance"
4. "My Bonnie"
5. "Take Some Insurance On Me, Baby"
6. * "What'd I Say"
7. "Sweet Georgia Brown"
8. "The Saints"
9. * "Ruby Baby"
10. "Why"
11. "Nobody's Child"
12. * "Ya Ya"
13. "My Bonnie" (English intro)
14. "My Bonnie" (German intro)
15. * "Let's Twist Again" (added track by The Beat Brothers)
16. * "Top Ten Twist" (added track by The Beat Brothers)
