= Nobody's Child (Hank Snow song) =

1949 single by Hank Snow

Single by Hank Snow (The Singing Ranger) and his Rainbow Ranch Boys
- B-side: "The Only Rose"
- Released: 1949
- Genre: Country
- Label: RCA Victor
- Songwriters: Cy Coben, Mel Foree

"Nobody's Child" is a song written by Cy Coben and Mel Foree and first recorded by Hank Snow in 1949. Many other versions of this song exist.

== History ==
It was first recorded by Hank Snow in 1949 and it became one of his standards, although it did not chart for him. The song has been covered several times in the UK. It was on Lonnie Donegan's first album in 1956 (which went to No. 2 on the UK Albums Chart), and in 1969 Karen Young took the song to No. 6 on the UK Singles Chart and used it as the title track on her album. In 1969, a recording by Hank Williams Jr. peaked at No. 46 on the US Country chart. The Traveling Wilburys' 1990 version made it to No. 44 on the UK chart.

The song lyrics are about an orphan whom no one wants to adopt because he is blind:

I'm nobody's child, I'm nobody's child
Just like a flower I'm growing wild
No mommy's kisses and no daddy's smile
Nobody wants me, I'm nobody's child.

== The Beatles with Tony Sheridan version ==
"Nobody's Child"

Single by the Beatles with Tony Sheridan
- A-side: "Ain't She Sweet" (US); "Sweet Georgia Brown" (GER)
- B-side: "Nobody's Child" (US); "Nobody's Child" (solo) (GER)
- Released: June 4, 1964 (US) / January 31, 1965 (GER)
- Recorded: June 22–23, 1961
- Genre: Rock
- Length: 2:58
- Label: Atco Records 6308 (US) / Polydor 52 906 (GER)
- Songwriters: Cy Coben, Mel Foree
- Producer: Bert Kaempfert

the Beatles US singles chronology
"Please Please Me" / "From Me to You" (1964)	"Sweet Georgia Brown" / "Nobody's Child" (1964)	"All My Loving" / "This Boy" (1964)

It was also covered by Tony Sheridan when he was recording in Hamburg, Germany, in June 1961 with the Beatles as his backing group. On this song, only Paul McCartney and Pete Best accompany Sheridan on bass and drums. This recording was released by Polydor in 1964 when the British group's popularity was at its height. Sheridan sings "Mammy's" (not "Mommy's"). He returned to studio later that year to re-record the vocal to "Sweet Georgia Brown", another Beatles track from these early sessions, and to tape a solo acoustic version of "Nobody's Child". The latter recording was only issued in Germany.

Nobody's Child became a classic favorite in Tony Sheridan's repertoire throughout his career. The source of his intense and deeply felt vocal performance of this song can be understood as flowing from his personal loss of his own mother when he was a toddler, when she abandoned him in an orphanage without a word, with no explanation, an event of which he gave an account in a 2010 radio interview broadcast: "My father disappeared by the time I came to my senses... My mother went to London to check on her relatives because of the [German] Blitz, and she came back pregnant. The effect it had on my life was that my father and mother broke up. He obviously said, "How can you be pregnant? It wasn't me!" The end result was that I finished up in this children's home, and I remember standing in this kid's bed, holding onto the railings and shaking them, and seeing my mother disappear down the ward. I was screaming! In those five minutes, I lost my mother forever, definitely, definitely, definitely. Not just my mum, she was taking the love with her as well. So now I'm this horrible piece of nothing with these other horrible pieces of nothing."

=== Release details ===
==== Singles ====
- "Ain't She Sweet" / "Nobody's Child" – released on 6 July 1964 by Atco in the US. It featured new drums overdubbed by session drummer Bernard Purdie.
- "Sweet Georgia Brown" / "Nobody's Child" (acoustic version) – released in 1964 in Germany by Polydor

==== Albums ====
- The Beatles' First! – original German release, April 1964
- The Beatles' First – released on August 4, 1967, in the UK
- Very Together – released in October 1969 in Canada
- In the Beginning (Circa 1960) – released on May 4, 1970, in the US
- The Early Tapes of the Beatles – worldwide CD release in 1984, with two new Sheridan songs not featuring the Beatles

=== Personnel ===
- Tony Sheridan – lead guitar & lead vocals
- Paul McCartney – bass guitar
- Pete Best – drums
- Bert Kaempfert – producer
- Peter Klemt – engineer

== Traveling Wilburys version ==
"Nobody's Child"

Single by Traveling Wilburys

from the album Nobody's Child: Romanian Angel Appeal
- B-side: "Lumiere" (Dave Stewart); "With a Little Help from My Friends" (Ringo Starr) (12-inch and CD only)
- Released: June 18, 1990
- Length: 3:27
- Label: Wilbury
- Songwriters: Cy Coben, Mel Foree
- Producer: Traveling Wilburys

Traveling Wilburys singles chronology
"Heading for the Light" (1989)	"Nobody's Child" (1990)	"She's My Baby" (1990)

Former Beatle George Harrison recorded "Nobody's Child" with his band the Traveling Wilburys at the start of the sessions for their 1990 album Traveling Wilburys Vol. 3. This was in response to an urgent request from his wife, Olivia Harrison, for assistance for the thousands of Romanian orphans abandoned in state-run orphanages following the fall of Communism in Eastern Europe. Harrison's bandmate Bob Dylan suggested the song for its relevant message. Unable to remember all the lyrics, Harrison phoned his friend Joe Brown, who gave him the first verse. He wrote a new second verse to address the plight of the children and babies in Romania, which ends with the lines "They've long since stopped their crying, as no one ever hears / And no one's there to notice them or take away their fears".

Lead vocals on the recording were shared between Dylan, Harrison, Tom Petty and Jeff Lynne. According to Harrison, the group completed the track within 48 hours of Olivia's phone call.

The Wilburys' "Nobody's Child" was released as a charity single on June 18, 1990, backed by Dave Stewart's "Lumiere". The 12-inch and CD formats also included a live version of "With a Little Help from My Friends" by Ringo Starr. Proceeds from the single went to the Romanian Angel Appeal Foundation, launched by Olivia with support from the other former Beatles' wives. Derek Hayes directed a music video for "Nobody's Child", using animation and news footage of the Romanian children. On July 23, the song was issued as the opening track of the charity album Nobody's Child: Romanian Angel Appeal, which Harrison compiled from further recordings donated by artists such as Eric Clapton, Elton John, Van Morrison, Paul Simon and Stevie Wonder.

Weekly charts

Weekly chart performance for "Nobody's Child" by Traveling Wilburys
Chart (1990)	Peak position
Australia (ARIA)	66
New Zealand (Recorded Music NZ)	9
UK Singles (OCC)	44

Year-end charts

Year-end chart performance for "Nobody's Child" by Traveling Wilburys
Chart (1990)	Position
New Zealand (Recorded Music NZ)	43

== Other cover versions ==
- Karen Young hit UK #6 with the song in 1969.
- Agnes Chan on her 1971 album Will The Circle Game Be UnBroken with the local Life Records.
- Billy Fury covered the song in 1972.
- Irene Ryder on her 1971 album Irene Ryder with EMI Regal Records
- Max Romeo and Techniques All Stars, both versions on a 1974 split 7-inch single released by Techniques Records.
- Majda Sepe (Slovenija). Her version was titled "Sirota", translated by G. Strniša (1969).
- The Alexander Brothers' biggest selling single was "Nobody's Child" in 1964.
