= Tony Sheridan =

British musician (1940–2013)

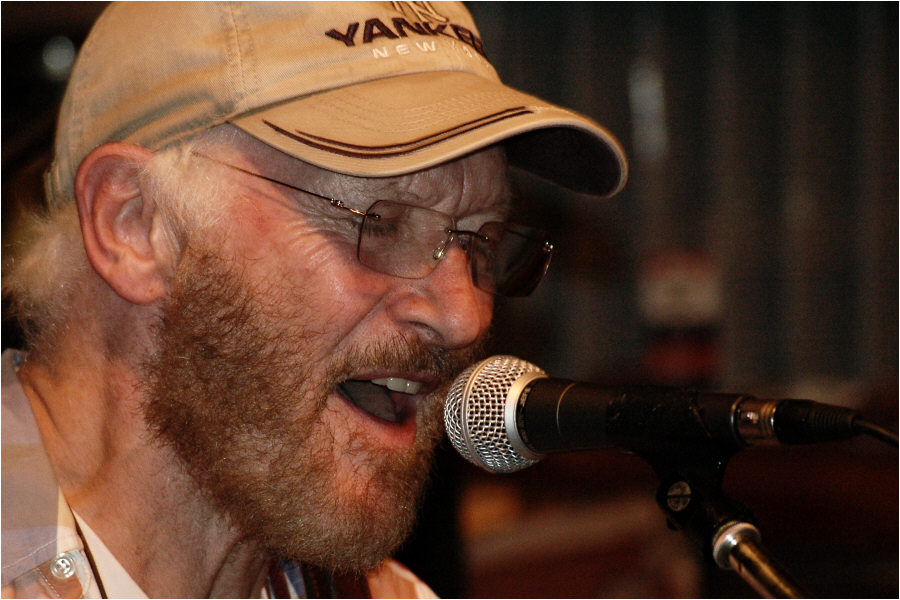
- Tony Sheridan performing live, November 2004

Background information
- Born: Anthony Esmond Sheridan McGinnity; 21 May 1940; Norwich, Norfolk, England
- Died: 16 February 2013 (aged 72) Hamburg, Germany
- Genres: Rock and roll; Merseybeat
- Occupations: Guitarist; singer; songwriter
- Instruments: Vocals; guitar; violin
- Years active: 1958–2013
- Label: Polydor
- Website: Official website

Anthony Esmond Sheridan McGinnity (21 May 1940 – 16 February 2013), known professionally as Tony Sheridan, was an English rock and roll guitarist who spent much of his adult life in Germany. He was best known as an early collaborator of the Beatles (though the record was labelled as being with "The Beat Brothers"), one of two non-Beatles (the other being Billy Preston) to receive label performance credit on a record with the group, and the only non-Beatle to appear as lead singer on a Beatles recording which charted as a single.

== Childhood and early career ==
Sheridan was born on 21 May 1940 in Norwich, Norfolk, where he grew up at 2 Hansell Road in Thorpe St Andrew and attended the City of Norwich School. His parents were Alphonsus McGinnity and Audrey Mann.

In his early life, Sheridan was influenced by his parents' interest in classical music, and by age seven, he had learned to play the violin. He attended the City of Norwich School. He had a leading role in the school production of The Mikado in 1951 and played the violin in the orchestra.

== Early career ==
He eventually came to play guitar, and in 1956, formed his first skiffle band and played at the Red Lion pub in Norwich. During the 1950s he played with the Cygnets and the Saints. He later went to play six months at The 2i's Coffee Bar in London's Soho, In 1958, only two years after starting to play in the skiffle band which he formed, Sheridan and Kenny Packwood began appearing live on the Oh Boy! television show made by ABC.

He was employed backing a number of singers, including Gene Vincent and Conway Twitty, while they were in England. Johnny Foster sought to recruit Sheridan as a guitar player in Cliff Richard's backing band (soon renamed the Shadows), but after failing to find him at the 2i's Coffee Bar opted for another guitarist present – Hank Marvin.

In 1959 he played the guitar solo on Cherry Wainer's studio recording of "The Happy Organ". The following year, he toured the UK with Gene Vincent and Eddie Cochran. On 16 April, Vincent and Cochran rejected Sheridan's request to ride with them; their car later crashed, killing Cochran.

== Disrepute in England and recovery in Hamburg ==
Despite these successes, Sheridan had a reputation for being late and showing up without his guitar and his professional standing in England suffered. An offer for a gig came from Bruno Koschmider's Kaiserkeller club in Hamburg, West Germany, for an English group to play there. Sheridan joined an ad hoc group dubbed the Jets and headed to Hamburg. While performing in Hamburg between 1960 and 1963, Sheridan employed various backup bands, most of which were "pickup bands" – an amalgam of various musicians, rather than a proper group. The Beatles had met Sheridan during their first visit to Hamburg in 1960 and worked with him during their second visit. In 1961, the Beatles (with their line-up at the time of John Lennon, Paul McCartney, George Harrison, Stuart Sutcliffe, and Pete Best) became even closer to Sheridan. They sometimes backed Sheridan, who in turn often joined them during their own sets backing them on guitar. They visited Sheridan's home while playing in Norwich (17th May 1963) and had jam sessions in the back garden.

Ringo Starr briefly played in Sheridan's backing band during early 1962, before returning to Rory Storm and the Hurricanes. Starr was reportedly unhappy with Sheridan performing songs he had not rehearsed with his band (other musicians made the same complaint, as well as about Sheridan's penchant for fist-fights).

== Polydor recordings with the Beatles ==
When a colleague of German Polydor producer/A&R man Bert Kaempfert saw the pairing on stage, he suggested that Sheridan and the Beatles make some recordings together. Kaempfert viewed Sheridan as the one with star potential, and though Kaempfert's production company signed the Beatles to play on Sheridan's records, the contract stipulated that the four Beatles (Lennon, McCartney, Harrison and Best) were guaranteed to play on a minimum of two songs. Of the seven songs recorded during Sheridan's two-day-long sessions for Polydor in June 1961, at times the band behind Sheridan would be down to only two Beatles (Paul McCartney and Pete Best). Conversely some say that only on their two songs do all four Beatles play (minus Sheridan), while Sheridan plays on all of his tracks. Lennon's rhythm guitar is heard only on the two Beatles tracks (though his voice is heard in background vocals as well as his handclaps on Sheridan's tracks).

During these sessions at Polydor nine songs were produced, seven of them for Sheridan: "My Bonnie", "The Saints", "Why", "Nobody's Child", "If You Love Me, Baby (Take Out Some Insurance on Me Baby)", "Sweet Georgia Brown" and "Swanee River" (this last recording is now lost, but it was recorded later on by Sheridan with another backup group). Two more songs without Sheridan were recorded by the Beatles: "Ain't She Sweet" and "Cry for a Shadow" (formerly titled "Beatle Bop").

It was said that "Sheridan didn't have a lot of originality, his performances mostly channeling Elvis".

Polydor's beliefs in Sheridan's coming stardom were so strong that they buried the two Beatles tracks until much later. Additionally, Lennon, Best and Sheridan all swore that there were several other Beatles tracks that were recorded during the two-day session, but they have not surfaced. In the spring of 1962 in order to fulfil contractual obligations, the four surviving Beatles (plus Roy Young but without Sheridan) recorded an instrumental version of "Sweet Georgia Brown"; later, Sheridan cut his vocal overdub for the song while solo in the studio. Reportedly "Swanee River" was also recorded by the Beatles and Young, though Polydor released a version in 1962 on Sheridan's album My Bonnie; however, Polydor states they have never found this last recording. A contemporary newspaper story also mentioned that Sheridan had recorded "You Are My Sunshine" with the Beatles as well for single release.

In 1962, after a series of singles (the first of which, "My Bonnie"/"The Saints" made it to number 5 in the German chart), the record was released in America on Decca with a black label and also in a pink label for demo play. The record has the distinction of being one of the most expensive collectible 45 rpm with the black label in mint condition selling for $15,000 in 2007 and the pink label selling for $3000.

Also in 1962, Polydor released the album My Bonnie across West Germany. The word "Beatles" was judged to sound too similar to the Hamburgisch dialect word "Pidels" (pronounced "peedles"), the plural of a slang term for penis, hence the album was credited to "Tony Sheridan and the Beat Brothers". After the Beatles had gained fame, the album was re-released in the United Kingdom, with the credit altered to "Tony Sheridan and the Beatles". The Beatles' Hamburg studio recordings, as well as some live recordings from the same period, have been reissued many times.

== Later career ==
In the mid-1960s, Sheridan's musical style underwent a drastic transformation, away from his rock and roll roots and towards a more blues- and jazz-oriented sound. Though those recordings were praised by some, many fans of his earlier work felt disappointed. The change was presaged by liner notes from his 1964 album, Just a Little Bit of Tony Sheridan, in which his musical preferences are listed as "jazz and classical" rather than rock. The liner notes also mention his wanting to visit the southern US "to hear at first hand the original negro music and experience the atmosphere that has been instrumental in creating negro jazz and the spiritual, for which he has a great liking." During 1967, Polydor continued releasing Tony Sheridan singles recorded with German producer Jimmy Bowien, though they only ever released two albums by him.

By 1967, Sheridan had become disillusioned with his Beatle-brought fame. Because he was more concerned by the Vietnam War and the thought of further Communist aggression, Sheridan agreed to perform for the Allied troops. While in Vietnam, the band that he had assembled was fired upon and one of the members was killed. For his work entertaining the troops, Sheridan was made an honorary Captain of the United States Army. Due to the repeated shellings he experienced in Vietnam, Sheridan subsequently suffered from great sensitivity to the sound of explosions.

With his Polydor contract gone, Sheridan did what he could to survive. In the early 1970s, he recorded a single as a pop duo, teamed with Carole Bell, and they toured Europe together with fair success. Following that phase he returned to playing in West Germany (usually Hamburg) or London. The mid-1970s saw him deejaying a West German radio programme of blues music, which was well received. He then managed to record a live album of early rock classics, a number of which had been part of his and the early Beatles live act but had never been released.

In 1978, a record producer in the United States heard Sheridan's early Polydor recordings (with and without The Beatles), and was impressed by Sheridan's singing and playing. Sheridan immediately accepted an offer to record a whole studio album in Los Angeles. Elvis Presley's TCB Band was hired to play on the album along with bassist (and former Hamburg friend) Klaus Voormann. An album of rock classics plus a few country tunes resulted but, with no major label release, it was restricted to direct TV sales. Thus, the prospect of a career in Las Vegas evaporated.

In 1978, the Star Club was reopened, and Sheridan performed there along with Elvis Presley's TCB Band.

In 1991, Joe Sunseri, Sheridan's biographer and then-manager, completed Nobody's Child: The Tony Sheridan Story. However, due to a falling-out, the biography remained unpublished.

On 13 August 2002, after a long hiatus away from the record industry, Bear Family Records released Sheridan's album Vagabond, a collection of his own material, except for a new cover version of "Skinny Minnie", a Bill Haley song he had recorded years earlier for his first album My Bonnie. Vagabond was different from his previous repertoire, consisting mainly of reflective ballads. "His development as an artist and on a personal and spiritual level makes Vagabond an interesting departure that bona fide r’n’r that made his reputation on the Hamburg scene way back in the 60's. Those who know his story know that he gradually departed from that said scene after his experiences in Viet Nam and his search for spiritual awareness.".

In 2002, the Argentinian rock musician Charly Garcia recorded his album Influencia, on which Tony Sheridan contributed as a singer/guitarist on the song "I'm Not in Love".

On 29 February 2004, the German classical music group "CHANTAL Instrumental Ensemble" produced a tribute concert for The Beatles, where they performed 15 instrumental Beatles songs along with an additional 11 played with Tony Sheridan as their guest star.

One of the highlights of the night, was the live performance of Sheridan's song "Tell Me If You Can", which he co-wrote with Paul McCartney during their time in Hamburg more than 40 years prior. The full set of the songs played on that night are found on the DVD of the event, entitled "CHANTAL meets Tony Sheridan - A Beatles Story". An abridged set of these songs was issued on CD (including all the tracks sung by Sheridan).

In 2005 the Ensemble CHANTAL and Sheridan produced the first studio version of the song "Tell Me If You Can" recorded at Abbey Road Studios, which was issued as a CD-Single including an instrumental version.

In 2007 Sheridan went to the Opus 3 Studio in Sweden to record some songs, three of which he sang: "Tell Me If You Can", "Indochina" (a song relating his experience when he performed for the US soldiers in Vietnam in the 1970s) and "The Puzzle". They were issued as part of the album: Tony Sheridan and Opus 3 Artists, which was released posthumously in 2018. The remaining nine tracks were original songs recorded by Sheridan in his home by himself with only his guitar, to which additional post-production arrangements were added to the basic tracks by the "Opus 3 Artists".

A biography of Sheridan, titled The Teacher (ISBN 0957528507), was published in 2013 by Norfolk author Alan Mann, a childhood-friend of Sheridan. The book was an email question and answer interview.

In 2015, Colin "Melander" Crawley, Sheridan's former bassist, published another biography, Tony Sheridan – The One The Beatles Called "The Teacher" (ISBN 9781515092612).

== Personal life ==
Although Sheridan was secretive about his personal life, in a 2010 radio documentary he shared his painful childhood experience of his mother "dumping" him in an orphanage without a word, with no explanation.

"My father disappeared by the time I came to my senses... My mother went to London to check on her relatives because of the [German] Blitz, and she came back pregnant. The effect it had on my life was that my father and mother broke up. He obviously said, 'How can you be pregnant? It wasn't me!' The end result was that I finished up in this children's home, and I remember standing in this kid's bed, holding onto the railings and shaking them, and seeing my mother disappear down the ward. I was screaming! In those five minutes, I lost my mother forever, definitely, definitely, definitely. Not just my mum, she was taking the love with her as well. So now I'm this horrible piece of nothing with these other horrible pieces of nothing."

Even though she came back to pick him up many months later, Sheridan explained that no matter how joyful it felt, "the damage has been done. The damage, it's there. The story of my life, basically, apart from the music (...), it's been [about] the sort of relationships which haven't worked, one way or another.

His friend and former bassist Crawley stated that in 1960 Sheridan confided that despite his mixed Irish-Catholic and Jewish background, he was at that point viewing himself as a Buddhist. Later, Sheridan became a devotee of the guru Bhagwan Sri Rajneesh and lived in the 1980s at the guru's Rajneeshpuram commune in Oregon, United States.

In the later part of his life, Sheridan lived in Seestermühe, a village north of Hamburg, and in addition to music, he was interested in heraldry and designed coats of arms.

== Death ==
Tony Sheridan died on 16 February 2013 in Hamburg, after undergoing heart surgery.

== Discography ==
=== Studio albums ===
List of Studio Albums
Title	Album Details	Peak Chart Position	Certifications
Title	Album Details	US	Certifications
My Bonnie with the Beat Brothers (includes two tracks with all Beatles members)	Released: June 1962; Label: Polydor	28	
Just a Little Bit of Tony Sheridan with the Beat Brothers	Released: 1964	—	
Novus	Released: 1984 (Denmark)	—	
Ich lieb Dich so	Released: 1986	—	
Dawn Colours	Released: 1987 (Italy)	—	
Here & Now!	Released: 1989	—	
Vagabond	Released : 2002	—	
Tony Sheridan and Opus 3 Artists	Released: 2018	—	

=== Live albums ===
List of Live Albums
Title	Album Details	Peak Chart Position	Cartifications
Title	Album Details	US	Cartifications
Twist at the Star Club Hamburg	Released: 1963	—	
Tony Sheridan Rocks on aka Live in Berlin '73	Released: 1974	—	
On My Mind (private release)	Released: 1976	—	
Tony Sheridan & The Beat Brothers Live And Dangerous (also released as "Rock Masters: Feel It"	Released: 1996	—	
Chantal Meets Tony Sheridan	Released: 2004	—	
Tony Sheridan Live 2007	Released: 2007	—	

=== EPs ===
List of EPs
Title	EP Details	Peak Chart Position	Certifications
Title	EP Details	US	Certifications
Mister Twist	Released: 1962 (France)	—	
Ya Ya EP	Released: 1962 (West Germany)	—	
Historical Moments: Tony Sheridan & Rod Davis	Released: 2001	—	
Tell Me If You Can (EP) Chantal feat. Geff Harrison	Released: 2005	—	

=== Compilations ===
List of Compilation Albums
Title	Album Details	Peak Chart Position	Certifications
Title	Album Details	US	Certifications
The Beatles' First feat. Tony Sheridan	Released: April 1964; Label: Polydor	—	
Ain't She Sweet	Released: 1964; Label: Atco	—	
Meet the Beat	Released: 1966	—	

=== Singles ===
List of Singles
Title	Single Details	Peak Chart Position	Certifications
Title	Single Details	US	Certifications
"Ich lieb' dich so (Ecstasy) / Der Kiss-Me Song"	Released: 1962	—	
"My Babe" (with the Big Six)	Released: 1965	—	
"Vive l'amour" (Tony Sheridan & the Big Six, producer: Jimmy Bowien)	Released: 1965	—	
"Ich lass dich nie wieder geh'n" (producer: Jimmy Bowien)	Released: 1967	—	

=== Other recordings ===
Title	Other Recording Details	Peak Chart Positions	Certifications
Title	Other Recording Details	US	Certifications
Sheridan in Control	Released: 1996 & 2001	—	
...And So It Goes	Released: 2008	—	

Sheridan played and sang backing vocal on one track of the Charly García 2002 album Influencia
