= Ain't She Sweet =

1927 song written by Milton Ager and Jack Yellen

"Ain't She Sweet?"

Song by Gene Austin
- B-side: "What Do I Care What Somebody Said"
- Published: January 17, 1927 by Ager, Yellen & Bornstein, Inc.
- Released: 1927
- Recorded: March 1927
- Studio: Victor Studios, New York City
- Genre: Jazz, Pop Vocal
- Label: Victor 20568
- Composer: Milton Ager
- Lyricist: Jack Yellen

Gene Austin singles chronology
"Tonight You Belong to Me" (1926)	"Ain't She Sweet?" (1927)	"My Blue Heaven" (1927)

Lillian Roth (1933)

"Ain't She Sweet" is a song composed by Milton Ager, with lyrics by Jack Yellen. It was published in 1927 by Ager, Yellen & Bornstein, Inc. It became popular in the first half of the 20th century and typified the Roaring Twenties. Like "Happy Days Are Here Again" (1929), it became a Tin Pan Alley standard. Both Ager and Yellen were elected to the Songwriters Hall of Fame.

Milton Ager wrote "Ain't She Sweet" for his daughter Shana Ager, who in her adult life was known as the political commentator Shana Alexander.

== Versions by the Beatles ==
"Ain't She Sweet"
- US picture sleeve

Single by the Beatles
- B-side: "If You Love Me, Baby" (UK); "Nobody's Child" (US)
- Released: 29 May 1964 (UK): 6 July 1964 (US)
- Recorded: 22 or 24 June 1961 (Note: Walter Everett dates the session as June 22–24 and "Ain't She Sweet" in particular as the 24th. Ian MacDonald dates the session as "June 22–23(?)" and the song as the 22nd. Mark Lewisohn dates the entire session as the 22nd, but offers the possibility of the 23rd. He writes, "No document survives to detail the start/finish times, the order of work, number of required takes, and whether the session took place over one day or two—most likely it was one, and personal recollections refer to it that way, but some papers show it as two, June 22 and 23." He also writes, "The recording of seven titles was easily achievable in one session so perhaps the second date was solely for editing, without Sheridan and the Beatles present." Audio expert Richard Moore notes that some of the songs recorded have a different "stereo picture", suggesting an alternate set-up across sessions or replacement equipment being brought in to a session.)
- Studio: Friedrich-Ebert-Halle, Hamburg (Note: Mark Lewisohn and Ian MacDonald both cite Friedrich-Ebert-Halle as the recording location. Walter Everett writes the recordings were split between Friedrich-Ebert-Halle on June 22–23 and the adjoining orchestral hall Studio Ralstedt on June 24. He writes "Ain't She Sweet" was recorded on June 24.)
- Genre: Rock and roll
- Length: 2:10
- Label: Polydor (UK); ATCO (US)
- Composer: Milton Ager
- Lyricist: Jack Yellen
- Producer: Bert Kaempfert

The Beatles UK singles chronology
"Can't Buy Me Love" (1964)	"Ain't She Sweet" (1964)	"A Hard Day's Night" (1964)

The Beatles US singles chronology
"Sie liebt dich" (1964)	"Ain't She Sweet" (1964)	"A Hard Day's Night" (1964)

The Beatles regularly performed the song live from 1957 to 1962. (Note: In an early 1960 letter Paul McCartney wrote to get a booking, he mentions "Ain't She Sweet" as a staple of The Quarrymen's act, amongst other numbers. They possibly played the song in a July 1960 show. A setlist of songs written in one of Stuart Sutcliffe's 1960 art sketchbooks includes the song. A setlist from August 1962 includes the song with Lennon on lead vocal.) According to Beatles historian Mark Lewisohn, "John [Lennon] may have known the song through his mother; he certainly knew it from Gene Vincent's 1956 recording on the LP Bluejean Bop!" In The Beatles as Musicians, Walter Everett offers a similar assessment, writing simply that it was "based on Gene Vincent's record." Musicologist and writer Ian MacDonald also agrees with this view. Lewisohn further notes that, "John Lennon's vocal rendition was different from Vincent's, it would seem that he arranged his own unique version... He may have also been influenced by Duffy Power's 1959 version". In the Beatles' Anthology book, McCartney recalls that "Songs like 'Till There Was You' and 'Ain't She Sweet' would be the late-night cabaret material. They showed that we weren't just another rock'n'roll group." (Note: McCartney further recalled, "The gigs went up in stature and though the pay went up only a little bit, it did go up. We were now playing better places. We would still do our rock act, though we wouldn't get decent money for any gig apart from cabaret. I could pull out 'Till There Was You' or 'A Taste of Honey'—the more cabaret things—and John would sing 'Over the Rainbow' and 'Ain't She Sweet'. These did have cred for us because they were on a Gene Vincent album and we didn't realise 'Rainbow' was a Judy Garland number; we thought it was Gene Vincent, so we were happy to do it.")

=== Recording ===
On June 22 or 24, 1961, during their first professional recording session, the Beatles recorded a cover of "Ain't She Sweet". Recorded at the Friedrich-Ebert-Halle in Hamburg, Germany, produced by Bert Kaempfert and engineered by Karl Hinze, the session saw the Beatles backing Tony Sheridan. George Harrison later recalled that the group misunderstood the purpose of the recording session and only learned upon arrival that they would be backing Sheridan. Harrison further added, "It was a bit disappointing because we'd been hoping to get a record deal as ourselves." "Ain't She Sweet" was one of two songs recorded without Sheridan (Note: The other being the instrumental "Cry for a Shadow", originally titled "Beatle Bop".) with Lennon instead on lead vocal. In 1968, Lennon reflected, "We thought it would be easy: the Germans had such shitty records, ours was bound to be better." MacDonald surmised that the Beatles decided to record a cover to save their stronger originals, such as McCartney's "Like Dreamers Do" and Lennon's "Hello Little Girl".

In a 1975 radio interview, Lennon explained that Gene Vincent's cover was "very mellow and very high pitched, and I used to do it like that, but they said harder, harder—you know, Germans all want it a bit more like a march—so we ended up doing a harder version of it." Lewisohn remarks that Lennon "gives it a good and powerful go, but there's a strange timbre to his voice, as if he was suffering from 'Hamburg throat' while also straining to deliver Kaempfert's brittle sound on a song that didn't suit it." Everett describes Lennon's singing style as "very detached, slightly hiccuping" and notes his use of a mordent for emphasis. Lewisohn further evaluated that Pete Best's drumming "lacks imagination" and McCartney's "bass is accomplished." Harrison's guitar solo "judged even in its place and time... wasn't good." Everett comments that, "as a whole, these recordings are hardly representative of the future Beatles." MacDonald judges it similarly, writing, "...it ["Ain't She Sweet"] made little sense as a choice for the Beatles' first professional recording and fails to reward attention in hindsight." In The Cambridge Companion to the Beatles, Howard Kramer writes that the session was "musically unspectacular" and "the Beatles' instrumental backing shows competence, but little more."

=== Release ===
After the session, the Beatles expected that a single of "Ain't She Sweet" b/w "Beatle Bop" would be released in America, Germany and Britain in the weeks that followed. It was not until October 23, 1961 that a single was released in West Germany exclusively, except it was instead "My Bonnie" b/w "The Saints", credited as "Tony Sheridan & The Beat Brothers". (Note: McCartney later recalled: "They didn't like our name and said, 'Change to The Beat Brothers; this is more understandable for the German audience.'" In his memoir, Pete Best claims the name was changed because "Beatles" was too close to a Hamburg slang term for male genitalia.) The Liverpool music newspaper Mersey Beat reported that the Beatles were dissatisfied with "Ain't She Sweet" and "Cry for a Shadow" and so sold their rights back to Kaempfert's company, Bert Kaempfert Produktion (BKP). Polydor's first worldwide release of "Ain't She Sweet" was on the February 1964 French EP, Les Beatles. Polydor released it in the U.K. as a single on May 29, 1964 b/w "If You Love Me, Baby", a mistitling of the Jimmy Reed song "Take Out Some Insurance". On July 6, 1964 ATCO Records released the track as a single in America b/w the Hank Snow song "Nobody's Child". In August 1964, the song peaked at number 19 on the US Billboard Hot 100. In Sweden, it reached number 4 on Sweden's Kvällstoppen Chart and also reached the top spot on the Tio i Topp chart. It was the highest-charting Beatles single with original drummer Pete Best. The Beatles were neither paid nor owed royalty payments for the release. The track has been included on several releases, including Ain't She Sweet (1964), The Beatles' First (1964) and In the Beginning (Circa 1960) (1970). The Beatles included the recording on the 1995 compilation album Anthology 1.

On 24 July 1969 during a recording session for "Sun King"/"Mean Mr. Mustard", Lennon began an impromptu jam of "Ain't She Sweet" along with the other Gene Vincent songs, "Who Slapped John?" and "Be-Bop-a-Lula". Lewisohn remarked that this version was more in the style of Gene Vincent than the Beatles' original 1961 version. The Beatles included this version of "Ain't She Sweet" on the 1996 compilation album Anthology 3.

=== Personnel ===
According to Ian MacDonald:

The Beatles

- John Lennon – lead vocal, rhythm guitar
- Paul McCartney – bass guitar
- George Harrison – lead guitar
- Pete Best – drums

=== Charts and certifications ===
==== Weekly charts ====
Chart (1964)	Peak position
Australia (Kent)	16
Canada Top Singles (RPM)	20
Denmark (Salgshitlisterne Top 20)	7
Sweden (Kvällstoppen)	4
Sweden (Tio i Topp)	1
UK Singles (Official Charts)	29
US Billboard Hot 100	19

== Film appearances ==
- Hazel Green & Company, a Warner Bros./Vitaphone musical short (1927)
- In January 1928, a short film of Ain't She Sweet sung by Chili Bouchier was filmed in the DeForest Phonofilm sound-on-film process
- Duck Soup (Paramount Pictures, 1933)
- Margie (Twentieth Century Fox, 1946)
- You Were Meant for Me (Twentieth Century Fox, 1948)
- You're My Everything (Twentieth Century Fox, 1949)
- Force of Arms (Warner Brothers, 1951)
- Strangers on a Train (Warner Brothers, 1951)
- Feed the Kitty (1952) Merrie Melodies cartoon
- East of Eden (Warner Brothers, 1955)
- The Eddy Duchin Story (Columbia Pictures, 1955)
- Picnic (MGM, 1955)
- Miss Mary (1986)
- Midnight in Paris (Sony Pictures Classics, 2011)

=== TV appearances ===
- The Beverly Hillbillies Season 1, Episode 8: "Jethro Goes to School" (sung by Phil Gordon; 1962)
- Coronation Street, sung by Sylvia Goodwin and others
- All in the Family, Season 5, Episode 1: "The Bunkers and Inflation", Part 1 (1974)
- House M.D. Season 2, Episode 9: "Deception"
- You Rang, M'Lord? Season 2, Episode 5: "The Wounds of War"
- Heartbeat (British TV series) Series 16, Episode 12: "Vendetta" (2007)
- Bunheads Season 1, Episode 1: "Pilot" (2012)
- Being Human Season 4, Episode 5: "The Honeymooners"

== Sources ==
- The Beatles (2000). The Beatles Anthology. San Francisco: Chronicle Books. ISBN 978-0-8118-2684-6.
- Best, Pete; Doncaster, Patrick (1985). BEATLE! The Pete Best Story. Plexus Publishing. ISBN 978-0-85965-077-9.
- Davies, Hunter (1968). The Beatles (Revised 2009 ed.). New York & London: W. W. Norton. ISBN 978-0-393-33874-4.
- Everett, Walter (2001). The Beatles as Musicians: The Quarry Men Through Rubber Soul. Oxford and New York: Oxford University Press. ISBN 978-0-19-514105-4.
- Gottfridsson, Hans Olof (1997). The Beatles from Cavern to Star-Club: The Illustrated Chronicle, Discography & Price Guide 1957–1962. Stockholm: Premium Publishing. ISBN 978-9-197-18947-7.
- Ingham, Peter; Mitsui, Toru (1987). "The Search for Sweet Georgia Brown: A Case for Discographical Detection". Popular Music. 6 (3): 273–290. doi:10.1017/S0261143000002324. hdl:2297/3432. ISSN 0261-1430. JSTOR 853188. S2CID 162876017. Accessed 24 February 2021.
- Kramer, Howard (2009). "Rock and Roll Music". In Womack, Kenneth (ed.). The Cambridge Companion to the Beatles. Cambridge: Cambridge University Press. pp. 65–74. ISBN 978-0-521-68976-2.
- Lewisohn, Mark (1988). The Complete Beatles Recording Sessions. New York: Harmony. ISBN 978-0-517-57066-1.
- Lewisohn, Mark (1992). The Complete Beatles Chronicle:The Definitive Day-By-Day Guide To the Beatles' Entire Career (2010 ed.). Chicago: Chicago Review Press. ISBN 978-1-56976-534-0.
- Lewisohn, Mark (2013a). The Beatles – All These Years, Volume One: Tune In. Crown Archetype. ISBN 978-1-4000-8305-3.
- Lewisohn, Mark (2013b). The Beatles – All These Years, Volume One: Tune In (Extended Special ed.). Crown Archetype. ISBN 978-1-4087-0478-3.
- MacDonald, Ian (2005). Revolution in the Head: The Beatles' Records and the Sixties (2nd revised ed.). London: Pimlico. ISBN 978-1-84413-828-9.
