= Why (Tony Sheridan song) =

- US picture sleeve

Single by The Beatles with Tony Sheridan
- A-side: "Cry for a Shadow"
- Released: 27 March 1964
- Recorded: 22 June 1961
- Genre: Rock
- Length: 2:55
- Label: Polydor (UK); MGM 13227 (US)
- Songwriters: Bill Crompton, Tony Sheridan
- Producer: Bert Kaempfert

"Why" is one of the early songs performed by the Beatles when they were backing Tony Sheridan. It was first issued on Sheridan's French extended play called "Mister Twist" in 1962. In the UK, it is the B-side of the instrumental rock tune "Cry for a Shadow". Although it was originally intended to be the A-side, the record label Polydor chose not to release it (at that time). When the Beatles were gaining popularity by 1964, the record label decided to release it with "Cry for a Shadow" as the A-side and "Why" as its B-side. In the US and Canada, it was released as originally intended, by the North American record label MGM with "Why" as the A-side and "Cry for a Shadow" as the B-side, due to it being an instrumental. Both were included on the German compilation album The Beatles' First! in 1964 and on all its other reissues worldwide in subsequent years.

"Why" reached number 88 on the US Billboard Hot 100 the week ending April 18, 1964. It spent only one week on the chart.

== Personnel ==
- Tony Sheridan – lead vocals
- John Lennon – rhythm guitar
- Paul McCartney – bass guitar
- George Harrison – lead guitar
- Pete Best – drums
- Karl Hinze – engineer

== Charts ==
Chart performance for "Why"
Chart (1964)	Peak position
US Billboard Hot 100	88
