= Cry for a Shadow =

- US picture sleeve

Single by the Beatles
- A-side: "Why (US)"
- B-side: "Why (Europe)"
- Released: January 1962 (French EP) 27 March 1964 (single); 20 November 1995 (Anthology 1)
- Recorded: 22 June 1961
- Studio: Friedrich-Ebert-Halle
- Genre: Instrumental rock
- Length: 2:20
- Label: Polydor (UK); MGM 13227 (US)
- Songwriter: Harrison/Lennon
- Producer: Bert Kaempfert

"Cry for a Shadow" is an instrumental rock piece recorded by the Beatles on 22 June 1961. They recorded the song at Friedrich-Ebert-Halle within the gymnasium, Hamburg, West Germany while they were performing as Tony Sheridan's backing band for a few tracks, under the moniker the Beat Brothers. It was written by George Harrison with John Lennon, as a pastiche of the Shadows' style (the Shadows, who backed Cliff Richard, were the biggest British instrumental rock & roll group at the time of the recording). It is the only Beatles track to be credited to Lennon and Harrison alone, and a rare Beatles non-vocal instrumental track.

"Cry for a Shadow"'s original title was "Beatle Bop". It was intended to be released as the B-side of "Why", another Sheridan song with the Beatles, but the record company Polydor chose to release another song instead. This instrumental is the Beatles' first recording of an original song commercially released when, in January 1962, it was included on Tony Sheridan's French EP entitled "Mister Twist". In mid-1963, as the Beatles were gaining popularity, Polydor decided to rerelease this EP in Germany as "Tony Sheridan With The Beatles", and in early 1964, "Cry for a Shadow" was released in Britain, Germany and Australia (where it reached number 32) as a single with "Why" changed to the B-side, while in North America, Sheridan's song was designated as the A-side.

This song is one of only two officially released Beatles singles to feature Pete Best on drums. The other is "Ain't She Sweet".

It is also featured on The Beatles' First and as part of the Anthology 1 compilation in 1995.

== Cover versions ==
"Cry for a Shadow" is one of the songs included on the Smithereens' collection of Beatles covers, B-Sides The Beatles (2008).

San Francisco new wave group Translator released a cover version of this song as a B-side to their song "Break Down Barriers" in 1983. The little-known recording was included as a bonus track on the 2008 CD re-release of their album No Time Like Now on Wounded Bird Records.

== Personnel ==
- George Harrison – lead guitar
- John Lennon – rhythm guitar
- Paul McCartney – bass, yell
- Pete Best – drums
