= Sweet Georgia Brown =

1925 song by Ben Bernie, Maceo Pinkard, and Kenneth Casey

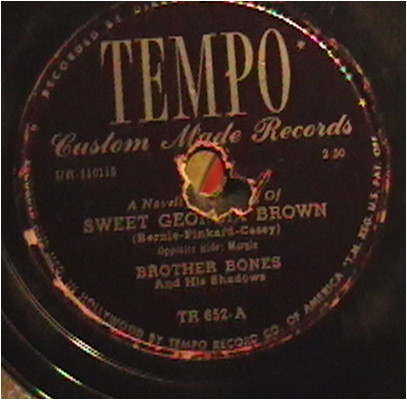
- 1949 version record label Brother Bones and His Shadows

Single by Ben Bernie and His Hotel Roosevelt Orchestra
- B-side: "Yearning Just For You"
- Published: March 20, 1925 Jerome H. Remick & co., New York
- Released: June 1925
- Recorded: March 19, 1925, take 575W
- Studio: 799 Seventh Avenue, Room no. 2, New York, New York City
- Genre: Jazz
- Length: 2:57
- Label: Vocalion 15002
- Songwriters: Ben Bernie, Maceo Pinkard, Kenneth Casey
- Producer: Arthur Lange (arranger)
- Performed by the Ben Bernie Orchestra (1925): file; help

"Sweet Georgia Brown" is a jazz standard composed in 1925 by Ben Bernie and Maceo Pinkard, with lyrics by Kenneth Casey.

== History ==
Reportedly, Bernie came up with the concept for the song's lyrics – although he is not the credited lyricist – after meeting Dr. George Thaddeus Brown in New York City. Dr. Brown, a longtime member of the Georgia House of Representatives, told Bernie about his daughter, Georgia Brown, and how subsequent to her birth on August 11, 1911, the Georgia General Assembly had issued a declaration that she was to be named Georgia after the state. This anecdote would be directly referenced by the song's lyric: "Georgia claimed her – Georgia named her".

The song uses a harmonic progression very similar to that of Harry Warren's 1922 hit Rose of the Rio Grande. Both songs use a descending circle of fifths pattern (VI7 - II7 - V7 - I) for their 16-bar "A" sections, and then have a second 16-bar "B" section that largely repeats the same pattern, though each song differs in the harmonic progressions of the final eight bars of their respective B sections. One of the lyric lines in "Sweet Georgia Brown" ("Georgia claimed her, Georgia named her") also echoes the rhyme scheme of a line in "Rose of the Rio Grande" ("You claim it, I'll name it").

The tune was first recorded on March 19, 1925, by bandleader Bernie, resulting in five weeks at number one for Ben Bernie and his Hotel Roosevelt Orchestra.

One of the most popular versions of "Sweet Georgia Brown" was recorded in 1949 by Brother Bones and His Shadows. Three years later, it was adopted as the theme song of the Harlem Globetrotters basketball team.

== Renditions ==
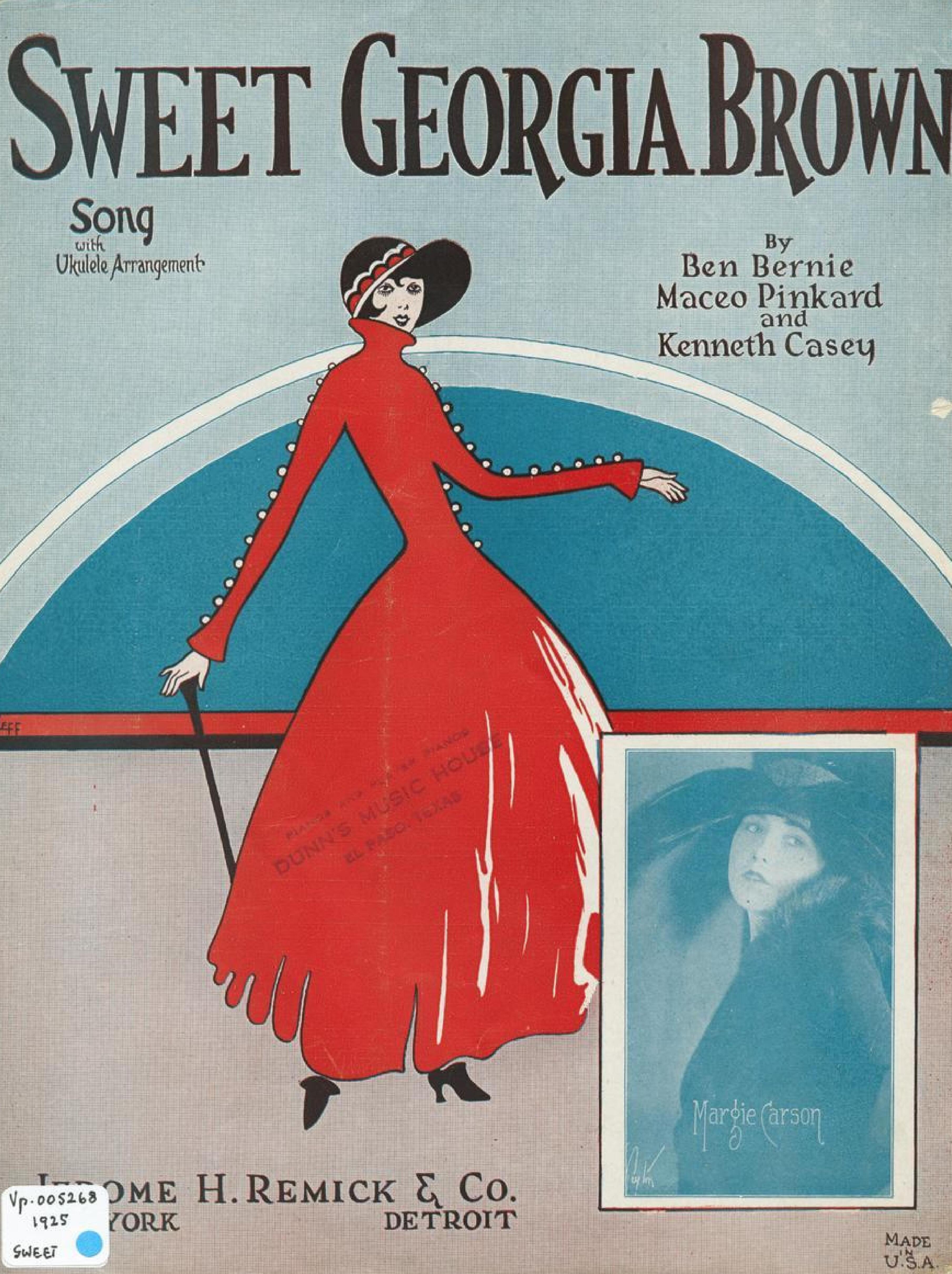
Sheet music cover, 1925

Bing Crosby recorded the song on April 23, 1932, with Isham Jones and His Orchestra and it is assessed as reaching number two in the charts of the day.

The version used by the Harlem Globetrotters is a 1949 instrumental by Brother Bones and His Shadows with whistling and bones by Brother Bones. It was adopted as the Globetrotters' theme in 1952. In 2025, the Brother Bones recording of "Sweet Georgia Brown" was selected by the Library of Congress for preservation in the National Recording Registry.

"Sweet Georgia Brown"
Performance by the Dixieland Band of the United States Army Field Band's Jazz Ambassadors (2017)

Tony Sheridan recorded it in December 1961 with his studio backing group, the Beat Brothers, and it was issued on his 1962 album My Bonnie. He rerecorded the song in 1964 for his next album, A Little Bit of Tony Sheridan, this time backed by the Bobby Patrick Big Six, but still credited to the Beat Brothers. The Beatles, with Roy Young on the piano, as a backup band recorded it again for Tony Sheridan on May 24, 1962, in Hamburg, Germany, using the original lyrics. This was released in Germany, on Sheridan's EP Ya Ya in 1962 and in Greece as the b-side of the single Skinny Minny. This recording was rereleased as a single in 1964 during the wave of Beatlemania with Sheridan having rerecorded the vocals with tamer lyrics and the additional verse: "In Liverpool she even dares/to criticize the Beatles' hair/With their whole fan-club standing there/oh Sweet Georgia Brown". This version can be heard on the German compilation album The Beatles' First! and its numerous reissues. The song was edited as a single for the American market with added guitar and drum parts.

Roberta Flack recorded "Sweet Georgia Brown" for her 1994 album Roberta. As Flack feared the song might be perceived as demeaning to women, her version featured newly added lyrics – written by Flack with her producers Jerry Barnes and Katreese Barnes – meant to establish Georgia Brown as (according to Flack) "a strong woman who is gorgeous, sexy, strong, and intelligent" rather than a pass-around girl. "Sweet Georgia Brown" has become a staple of Flack's live shows, the singer having stated that the lyric changes "cost me $25,000 so I sing [the song] whenever I have the chance."

=== Other recordings ===
- Ben Bernie and His Hotel Roosevelt Orchestra, 1925
- California Ramblers, 1925
- Ethel Waters, 1925
- Lillie Delk Christian with Johnny St. Cyr, 1926
- Cab Calloway, 1931
- Coleman Hawkins with Benny Carter and Django Reinhardt, 1937
- Django Reinhardt, 1938
- Art Tatum, 1941
- Charlie Parker and Dizzy Gillespie, 1943
- Bud Powell, 1950
- Red Norvo with Charles Mingus and Tal Farlow, 1950
- Gale Storm, album Gale Storm Sings, 1956
- Matthew Gee, album Jazz by Gee (1956
- The Coasters, 1957
- Anita O'Day, Jazz on a Summer's Day, 1958
- Edmond Hall, 1958
- Carol Burnett, 1960
- Nancy Sinatra, for the 1966 album Sugar
- Ella Fitzgerald, 1966 album Whisper Not (Verve) with Marty Paich and His Orchestra
- Ella Fitzgerald, 1966 live with the Duke Ellington Orchestra and the Jimmy Jones trio
- Ella Fitzgerald, 1966 (July 29) live at the Côte d'Azur, France - A Night with Duke Ellington and his Orchestra and Jimmy Jones Trio
- Ella Fitzgerald, 1968 (May 19) live with Fraser MacPherson Big Band, from The Cave Supper Club – Vancouver BC, Canada
- Ella Fitzgerald, 1968 live in Berlin with Ben Bernie, Kenneth Casey and Maceo Pinkard
- Jerry Lee Lewis, for the 1970 album There Must Be More To Love Than This
- Ella Fitzgerald, 1974 (April 11) live album at Ronnie Scott’s, London, accompanied by a quartet led by pianist Tommy Flanagan
- Rahsaan Roland Kirk, for the 1976 album The Return of the 5000 Lb. Man.
- Gentle Giant, for the 1977 live album Playing The Fool.
- Oscar Peterson, Niels-Henning Ørsted Pedersen, and Ray Brown performed the song live at the Montreux Jazz Festival, 1977
- Ella Fitzgerald, 1979 (July 12) live album A Perfect Match with the Count Basie Orchestra at Jazz in Montreux ‘79
- Ella Fitzgerald, 1981 live at the Dutch TV show « Music All In » with the Metropole Orchestra conducted by Rogier van Otterloo
- Oscar Peterson, Live at the Blue Note, 1990
- The hip hop group A Tribe Called Quest sampled a 1976 cover by The Singers Unlimited for their penultimate album The Love Movement on the track "Start It Up".
- Denny Zeitlin, Slickrock, 2003
- Mel Brooks used a Polish version of the song in his 1983 movie To Be or Not to Be. It is performed by his wife Anne Bancroft and himself.
- Take 6's version on the 2008 album The Standard features both whistling and vocals.
- Danny Gatton- Redneck Jazz Explosion Live in 1977 CD- The Humbler Stakes His Claim
- Bugs Bunny sings the song to himself in the cartoon Hare Trigger after luring Yosemite Sam into a vicious bar fight.

== See also ==
- List of 1920s jazz standards
