= Bill Smith (English musician) =

Musical artist (born 1940)

- Born: William Frederick Smith; 12 July 1940 (age 85); Liverpool, England, U.K.
- Genres: Skiffle
- Instrument: Tea chest bass
- Years active: 1956
- Formerly of: The Quarrymen

William Frederick Smith (born 12 July 1940) is an English former musician, who was a founding member of The Quarrymen. His tenure with the group was short, only performing with them for one month (November 1956).

== The Quarrymen ==
Smith attended Quarry Bank High School. In 1956, classmates John Lennon and Eric Griffiths decided to form a skiffle group in November 1956. This initial line-up consisted of Lennon and Griffiths on guitars, Pete Shotton on washboard, and school friend Smith on tea chest bass. Smith acquired a tea chest bass by stealing one from the woodwork shop at their school:

I remember that we decided to decorate the tea-chest bass. We painted it first, and then John painted cartoons on the side of it. I kept it at my house and took it with me whenever we were playing.

The group, initially called the Blackjacks, quickly changed its name to the Quarrymen. Smith's tenure in the band was extremely short, and he was replaced in quick succession by Nigel Walley, Ivan Vaughan, and Len Garry throughout late 1956 and early 1957. Smith's tea chest bass was stolen by John Lennon and Pete Shotton. The two managed to steal by leaving school early with a forged letter claiming they were going to John's aunt's funeral, who didn't even exist. Once Smith found out later on that his bass was stolen, he snuck into Shotton's house and retrieved it back. Bill hid the bass in his attic, before his father threw it out many years later. Smith last saw John Lennon on a bus in January 1962.

== Personal life ==
William Frederick Smith was born at Sefton general hospital. He attended Mosspits Lane Primary School, which many future Quarrymen members, including Len Garry, Pete Shotton and Nigel Walley, and briefly, John Lennon, attended. He trained at the National Sea Training School in Gloucestershire for six weeks.
