= Len Garry =

English musician (1942–2026)

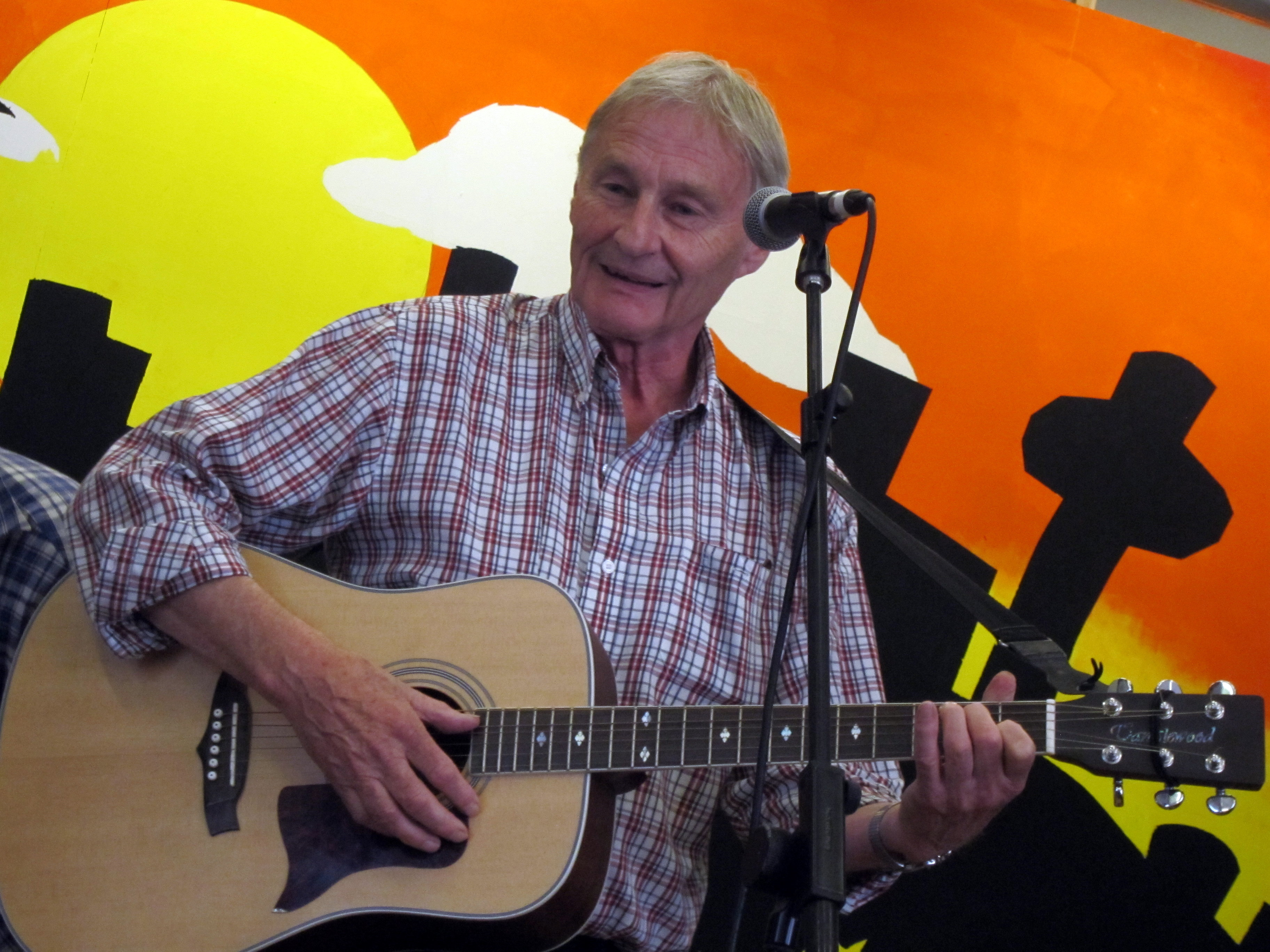
- Garry performing with the Quarrymen in 2011

Background information
- Born: 6 January 1942; Wavertree, Liverpool, England
- Died: 2 March 2026 (aged 84) Liverpool, England
- Genres: Skiffle; rock
- Occupation: Musician
- Instruments: Tea-chest bass; guitar; vocals
- Years active: 1957–2026
- Formerly of: The Quarrymen

Leonard Charles Garry (6 January 1942 – 2 March 2026) was an English musician, best known for being a member of The Quarrymen, a band which later evolved into The Beatles.

== Early life ==
Garry was born in Wavertree, Liverpool, on 6 January 1942. His father Henry worked as a compositor at the Liverpool Daily Post, and his mother Phyllis was a housewife. His older brother, Walter, was born three years earlier. Garry attended Mosspits Lane Primary School, which included future Quarrymen members Pete Shotton, Nigel Walley and, briefly, John Lennon. He learned how to play the piano as a child.

== The Quarrymen ==
=== 1957–1958 ===
In 1953, Garry was a pupil at Liverpool Institute High School for Boys, where he met Ivan Vaughan, who later introduced him to Paul McCartney. The two knew each other briefly as they were in the same German class. Two years later, Garry met John Lennon and in 1956 the Quarrymen were formed. The Quarrymen's original tea-chest bassist, Bill Smith, departed from the group after failing to continuously appear for practice sessions and Garry became the band's new tea-chest bassist. This group, consisting of John Lennon, Eric Griffiths, Pete Shotton, Garry, Colin Hanton, and Rod Davis, formed the first stable line-up.

Garry performed with the Quarrymen at two of their most historical performances, on Rosebery Street, on 22 June 1957, and at their first performance at The Cavern Club. Garry remained with the group for a few months but had to drop out after falling severely ill with tubercular meningitis. He did not return to the group. He recalled:

In 1955 I finally met John Lennon when Ivan Vaughan invited him to Woolton, where I bumped into Lennon, Shotton, Ivan and Nigel walking along Vale Road. I soon became "one of the gang" who would hang around Calderstones Park. In 1956 a lad called George Lee, a friend of Eric Griffiths and John Lennon at Quarry Bank School, suggested to John that he form his own group. This was at the height of the skiffle craze, and sure enough in the autumn of 1956 the band that was to become the Quarrymen took shape, with another Quarry Bank lad called Bill Smith on tea chest bass. Bill however, never turned up for practices and so I soon stepped into his shoes and became a permanent member of the band, staying with the group until August 1958 when I fell seriously ill with tubercular meningitis, spending some 7 months in hospital.

A few months after Garry's departure, the Quarrymen recorded their first singles: "That'll Be the Day" and "In Spite of All the Danger". Garry was one of two members of the Quarrymen who did not attend Quarry Bank High School, after which the band was named after, the other being Nigel Walley. Garry was in the same room as John Lennon, when he and McCartney first met on 6 July 1957:

I remember Paul coming along that night at St Peter's Church Hall, picking up a guitar – I didn't even know he was left-handed – and playing a couple of chords. I think he was trying to audition for us. John always wanted someone to support him, no matter what he did, and Paul came along at the right time. It wasn't just about playing guitar together or singing, it was about composing as well.

=== 1994–2026 ===
In 1997, Garry reunited with surviving members of the Quarrymen to perform a concert to commemorate 40 years since the group's formation. They embarked on a tour of the United Kingdom, United States, Germany, Japan, among others. Garry participated on all subsequent Quarrymen releases, including their three albums Get Back – Together (1997), Songs We Remember (2004), and Grey Album (2012). Their later material primarily consisted of rock and roll and skiffle songs from the 1950s. Garry was portrayed by actor Frazer Bird in the 2009 biopic Nowhere Boy. The Quarrymen performed in New York City, for what would have been Lennon's 70th birthday in 2010.

== Later life and death ==
As a young adult, Garry worked as an architect in Liverpool and married. In 1971, he and his wife moved to Chard, Somerset. During his time in Somerset, he fronted a rock gospel group called Come Together, and both of his daughters were born there. In 1987, he and his family migrated to New Zealand; after a few months they returned to England and they moved back to Liverpool.

Garry died at home on 2 March 2026, aged 84, from pneumonia following a chest infection.

== Discography ==
=== With The Quarrymen ===
==== Studio albums ====
Title	Year
Get Back – Together	1997
Songs We Remember	2004
Grey Album	2012

==== Live albums ====
Title	Year
Live At The Halfmoon Pub Putney	2005
The Quarrymen Live! In Penny Lane	2020
