= Open for Engagements =

Studio album by The Quarrymen
- Released: 1994
- Recorded: Coach House Studios, Bristol, 1994
- Genres: Skiffle; rock and roll
- Length: 50:08
- Label: Griffin Music
- Producer: The Quarrymen

The Quarrymen chronology
Open for Engagements (1994)	Get Back – Together (1997)

Open for Engagements is the first studio album released by the Quarrymen after their 1994 reformation. The Quarrymen, in its original conception, was the band that evolved into the Beatles. However the only official members of the Quarrymen to appear on the album were founding members Rod Davis and John Duff Lowe.

== Background ==
=== Early Attempts ===
In 1992, John Duff Lowe set out to release an album under the name of the Quarrymen, a band he had been in with John Lennon in the early 50s, before he left in 1958, and the band morphed into the Silver Beetles in 1960. Lowe was inspired to create the album after he played keyboards with The Four Pennies, who recently released an album together, and suggested to the man who created their album that he should try and get the Quarrymen back together. Lowe partnered with fellow former Quarrymen Rod Davis, the band’s banjo player in 1957, and Len Garry, a tea chest bassist for the band in 1956 to 1958, to record an album under the Quarrymen name.

The trio went to create a first attempt in 1992 at Amadeus Studios in Liverpool, with Len Garry on primary vocals, but the recordings from the first attempt remain unreleased.

A second attempt was made in 1992, once again at Amadeus Studios, but the studio went bankrupt and refused to give the band the recordings., leaving the second attempt unreleased as well.

=== Final attempt ===
Lowe would try again with Davis in 1994, with Garry absent due to losing interest recording the album. To flesh out the recordings, they got singer/guitarist John Ozoroff, singer/percussionist Charles Hart, and bassist Richie Gould to complete the recordings, with Ozoroff and Lowe writing a few original compositions for the album. The album was recorded at Coach House Studios in Bristol. Open for Engagements was subsequently released under the Quarrymen name, even though no other former Quarrymen members participated.

== Releases ==
The album was first released under a limited release by Kewbank Records in 1994, before a wider release in 1995 with a new cover artwork under Griffin Music. The 1995 reissue includes a booklet in the CD cover with information about the band and the songs within. The album appeared on streaming for a while, but is no longer on any streaming platforms.

== Track listing ==
All tracks are written by John Ozoroff and John Duff Lowe except where noted.

No.	Title	Length
1.	"Dizzy Miss Lizzy" (Larry Williams)	4:34
2.	"History"	4:02
3.	"Thumbin' a Ride" (Jerry Leiber and Mike Stoller)	2:56
4.	"Come Go with Me" (Clarence Quick)	2:51
5.	"In the Right Place"	3:32
6.	"Twenty Flight Rock" (Eddie Cochran, Ned Fairchild)	2:40
7.	"John Winston"	3:38
8.	"Shinto"	4:23
9.	"Misty Eyes"	3:47
10.	"Tryin' to Get to You" (Rose Marie McCoy, Charles Singleton)	2:32
11.	"Mean Woman Blues" (Claude Demetrius)	3:08
12.	"Tanya"	3:46
13.	"That'll Be the Day" (Jerry Allison, Buddy Holly, Norman Petty)	2:25
14.	"Cycle Song"	3:57
15.	"Life of Sleep"	1:52
Total length:		50:08

== Personnel ==
The Quarrymen

- John Duff Lowe – vocals, keyboards
- Rod Davis – vocals, acoustic guitar

Additional musicians

- Richie Gould – bass
- John Ozoroff – guitar
- Charles Hart – percussion

Production staff

- Graham Waddell – engineer
- Nick Webb – mastering
- Andy Allen – engineer
- Oliver Jones – assistant engineer
