= Get Back – Together =

Studio album by The Quarrymen
- Released: September 1997
- Recorded: Music House Studios, Liverpool, 1997
- Genre: Skiffle; rock and roll
- Length: 30:49
- Label: Quarrymen Records
- Producer: The Quarrymen

The Quarrymen chronology
Open for Engagements (1994)	Get Back – Together (1997)	Songs We Remember (2004)

Get Back – Together is the second album by the reformed Liverpool band the Quarrymen, which was the band that, in its original conception, evolved into the Beatles. It is also the first of two albums by the band that feature all surviving founding members together, as while the name the Quarrymen name was used in the 1994 album Open for Engagements seen as the first album since the reformation, it only featured Rod Davis and part-time member John Duff Lowe. Eric Griffiths and Len Garry make their first appearances on a studio recording, with drummer Colin Hanton also returning to the band for the first time since 1959, having previously appeared on the "In Spite of All The Danger" recording in 1958 as a b-side to a cover of Buddy Holly's "That'll Be the Day". It is also the only full-length album featuring Pete Shotton, who also returned to the band in 1997 but later retired due to ill health. Shotton subsequently died in 2017. The album was recorded and mixed at Liverpool Music House by record producer and engineer Lance Thomas.

== Background and content ==
The album was recorded in Liverpool in 1997 (produced, engineered and mixed by Lance Thomas) and released the same year. The content of the album is drawn from the early repertoire of the original Quarrymen (which included John Lennon, Paul McCartney and George Harrison) and features fifteen songs that were regularly performed live by The Quarrymen in the late 1950s. The album's title refers to the Beatles' 1969 song "Get Back".

Professional ratings
Review scores
Source	Rating
AllMusic	link
Robert Christgau	link

== Track listing ==
1. "Mean Woman Blues" (2:17) (Claude Demetrius)
  - Covered by Paul McCartney during the Unplugged sessions (and released on a promo single)
2. "Midnight Special" (2:17) (Traditional)
  - Covered by the Beatles in 1969 during their Get Back Sessions. Also covered by McCartney on his live Unplugged album as well as a regular part of McCartney's sound check set.
3. "Blue Moon of Kentucky" (2:06) (Bill Monroe)
  - Covered by the Beatles in 1994 during the reunion sessions for The Beatles Anthology project. Also covered by McCartney on his live Unplugged album.
4. "I Forgot to Remember to Forget" (2:26) (Stan Kesler, Charlie Feathers)
  - Covered live by the Beatles on BBC radio and released on disc in 1994.
5. "Whole Lotta Shakin' Goin' On" (1:40) (Dave "Curlee" Williams)
  - Covered by the Beatles during the Get Back Sessions
6. "Pick a Bale of Cotton" (1:38) (Traditional)
7. "That's All Right Mama" (1:58) (Arthur Crudup)
  - Covered live by the Beatles on BBC radio and released on disc in 1994.
8. "Blue Suede Shoes" (1:35) (Carl Perkins)
  - The Beatles recorded an impromptu version of this song during their Get Back Sessions in January 1969. An edited version of that performance was released on Anthology 3 in 1995.
9. "When the Sun Goes Down" (2:19) (Leroy Carr)
10. "Don't Be Cruel" (1:53) (Otis Blackwell)
  - Covered by Ringo Starr, never a member of The Quarrymen, as an early 1990s B side, and released on a Japanese edition of "Time Takes Time"
11. "You're Right, I'm Left, She's Gone" (2:18) (Stan Kesler, William Taylor)
12. "Bebop-A-Lula" (1:40) (Gene Vincent, Tex Davis)
  - Covered by John Lennon on his 1975 Rock 'n' Roll album.
13. "Have I Told You Lately that I Love You?" (2:23) (Scotty Wiseman)
  - Covered by Starr on his first solo album, Sentimental Journey
14. "Twenty Flight Rock" (1:57) (Eddie Cochran)
  - Lennon was impressed with McCartney when he showed him how to play this song in 1957.
15. "Lost John" (2:12) (Traditional)
  - The Beatles recorded this during the Get Back sessions, and Lennon recorded it again in 1970, later releasing it in 1998 on his Anthology

== Personnel ==
The Quarrymen

- Len Garry – vocals, guitar
- Eric Griffiths – guitar
- Rod Davis – vocals, guitar
- Colin Hanton – drums
- Pete Shotton – washboard, tea-chest bass

Production staff

- Lance Thomas – recording and mix engineer

== Reception ==
Professional ratings
Review scores
Source	Rating
AllMusic	3/5 stars
Rate Your Music	2.73/5 stars

Bruce Eder of AllMusic stated that the musicians were "spirited and enthusiastic".
