= Ken Brown (musician) =

Musical artist (1940-2010)

Background information
- Born: 20 August 1940; Enfield, Middlesex, England
- Origin: Middlesex
- Died: c. 9 June 2010 (aged 69) Essex, England
- Genres: Skiffle, Rock and roll
- Occupation: Musician
- Instrument: Guitar
- Years active: 1959–1960

Kenneth Brown (20 August 1940 – c. 9 June 2010) was a British guitarist with The Quarrymen, a precursor to The Beatles.

== Early life ==
Brown was born in Enfield, Middlesex in August 1940, but moved with his family to Liverpool the following year.

== Career ==
Ken Brown was a member of the Les Stewart Quartet with Les Stewart, George Harrison, and Geoff Skinner. Mona Best opened The Casbah Coffee Club on 29 August 1959, and Brown arranged for the quartet to be its resident band. When Brown missed rehearsals to help decorate The Casbah, Stewart refused to play. Brown and Harrison recruited John Lennon and Paul McCartney at short notice to help them fulfil the residency, and used the name of The Quarrymen. They played a series of seven Saturday night engagements in The Casbah for 15 shillings each per night, starting on 29 August to October 1959, featuring Brown, Lennon, McCartney and Harrison, but without a drummer, and only one microphone connected to the club's small PA system. The opening night performance was attended by about 300 local teenagers, but as the cellar had no air-conditioning and people were dancing, the temperature rose to a level where it became hard to breathe.

Brown injured his leg on 10 October and it was agreed that he could not play, so he rested upstairs while the three future Beatles, Lennon, Harrison, and McCartney played the gig. Mona Best still divided the group's £3 fee (equivalent to £100 in 2025) equally between the four of them. An argument ensued that meant Brown lost his place in the group.

Ken Brown formed the Blackjacks with Pete Best (the son of Mona Best) on drums and 'Chas' Newby. The group played at the Casbah until Pete Best was invited to join the Beatles just before their first 1960 trip to Hamburg in Germany. On 6 August 1960, the Beatles watched the Blackjacks perform at the Casbah Coffee Club. The Blackjacks disbanded and Brown moved to London. Brown never established himself as a professional musician.

== Autobiography ==
Brown wrote an autobiography of his experiences initially called My Life and subsequently retitled Some Other Guy! The approximately 38,000-word manuscript never found a market and remains unpublished.

== Death ==
Brown suffered from emphysema and died at his home in Essex aged 69. His body was discovered on 14 June 2010; police determined that he had died about five days earlier.

== Bibliography ==
- Cynthia Lennon (2006). John. Hodder & Stoughton. ISBN 978-0-340-89828-4.}
- Barry Miles (1997). Many Years From Now. Vintage-Random House. ISBN 978-0-7493-8658-0.
- Bob Spitz (2006). The Beatles: The Biography. Little, Brown and Company (New York). ISBN 978-1-84513-160-9.
