= Phillips' Sound Recording Services =

Recording studio in Liverpool, England

Coordinates: 53°24′39.6″N 2°57′36.2″W

- Phillips in his studio, 1977
- Born: Percy Francis Phillips; March 1896; Warrington, Lancashire, England
- Died: 1984 (aged 88); Liverpool, Lancashire, England
- Occupations: Shop owner and studio engineer
- Known for: recording The Quarrymen, who later became The Beatles
- Spouse(s): Edwina Phillips (1st wife); Hilda Phillips (2nd wife)
- Children: 3

Phillips' Sound Recording Services was a studio in the house of Percy Francis Phillips (1896–1984) and his family at 38 Kensington, Kensington, Liverpool, England. Between 1955 and 1969, Phillips recorded numerous tapes and acetate discs for Liverpool acts, people and businesses in a small room behind the shop his family owned.

Phillips first sold bicycles and motorbikes, but later started selling and recharging batteries in a shop in the front room of his house in 1925. After a decline in demand for batteries in the early 1950s, he started selling electrical goods and popular records. In 1955, Phillips set up a recording studio called Phillips' Sound Recording Services.

In 1958, The Quarrymen (John Lennon, Paul McCartney, George Harrison, John 'Duff' Lowe and Colin Hanton) recorded "That'll Be The Day" and "In Spite of All the Danger" in the studio. Other clients included Billy Fury, Ken Dodd, and Marty Wilde. Phillips died in 1984. The Quarrymen recording and the site of the studio were commemorated in 2005, when a Blue Plaque was unveiled by two of The Quarrymen (Lowe and Hanton) on the front of the house.

== Early years ==
Percy Phillips was born in March 1896, in Warrington, Lancashire. He was a veteran of the First World War, and left the British Army (Royal North Lancashire Regiment) at the rank of Corporal in 1918, since he was wounded before the war ended.

After the war, he started selling bicycles and motorbikes in a small shop in Brunswick Street, in the Kensington Fields area of Liverpool. He began selling and recharging batteries in 1925, opening a shop in the front room of his family's three-storey Georgian terraced house, called Phillips’ Battery Charging Depot, and had to install large accumulators in the cellar. Phillips ran the business for 30 years, even during WWII, but due to a decline in demand for batteries in the early 1950s (most people having electricity by then) he started selling household electrical goods. By late 1954, the shop was only selling records and record players; customers would buy recordings of American Country and Western, and Big Band music. As Phillips had supplied batteries to the Burtonwood air base during the war, he could buy and sell the latest records from America via his contacts there.

== Studio ==
Percy Phillips' shop, studio, and home at 38 Kensington, Liverpool

In 1955, several customers asked if Phillips could make demo discs. While on a trip to London to visit his son Frank, who was attending a sound recording course at EMI Electronics, Percy bought a 1/4 inch tape recorder (replaced in 1963 with a Vortexion portable), an MSS (Marguerite Sound Studios - after the owner's wife) disc cutting machine, an amplifier, a 4-track mixer, three microphones (a Reslo, a His Master's Voice ribbon microphone, and an AKG), and three pairs of headphones for £400.

Phillips set up the equipment behind his shop in the (12 square feet) middle living room, with a piano and an overturned tin bath in the cellar as a reverb chamber, with a speaker and microphone linked to the studio above. The recordings would normally be on tape, and then transferred to disc, although the tape was recorded over again for each session. Because of trams, trucks, and horses passing the premises, Phillips hung heavy blankets over the studio door and a rear window to minimise noise intrusion. Phillips' first recording was of himself singing "Bonnie Marie of Argyle", (unaccompanied) and a few days later he recorded "Unchained Melody", with local dance band singer Betty Roy. The first disc he cut in the studio was on 7 August 1955, with his eight-year-old daughter, Carol, singing, "Mr Sandman". All the discs had "Play with a light-weight pick-up" on the label, as this would increase the life of the disc, which would eventually wear out.

Phillips advertised the studio as Phillips' Sound Recording Services (also advertised as P. F. Phillips' Professional Tape & Disc Recording Service), with his business cards reading: "PF Phillips, 38 Kensington, Liverpool, 7. Television and Battery Service. Gramophone Record Dealer. Professional Tape and Disc Recording Studio." He cut discs for members of the public, and actors from the Liverpool Playhouse, who often stayed in the first-floor boarding rooms above the studio. Many of the actors would be asked by Phillips to record monologues and poems. These included the actors John Thaw, Richard Briers, and the ventriloquist Ray Alan.

For the first couple of years, Phillips made music compilation discs for local businesses such as the local ice rink or cinema, men singing songs for loved ones, children playing an instrument, or even a neighbour's dog howling along to piano accompaniment. As the record shop and studio took over the business, he had a brass plate made which he put on the wall just outside the front door, and had labels made for the discs, but changed the design of the disc label every year. By 1957, Phillips was recording more and more groups of young men with guitars, basses, washboards and drums, who played skiffle.

Ron Wycherly (a.k.a. Billy Fury) recorded several songs onto disc in the studio, including, "I'm Left You're Right She's Gone", "Playin' For Keeps", "Paralyzed" and "Come Go With Me" (all previously released by Elvis Presley) as well as, "Have I Told You Lately That I Love You" (Lulu Belle and Scotty) and his own composition, "Yodelling Song". Fury's mother sent the songs to impresario Larry Parnes, which started her son's singing career. The songs were released on DVD/CD in 2008.

== The Quarrymen recording ==
Side two of The Quarrymen's record: "In Spite of All the Danger" (running time 3.25)

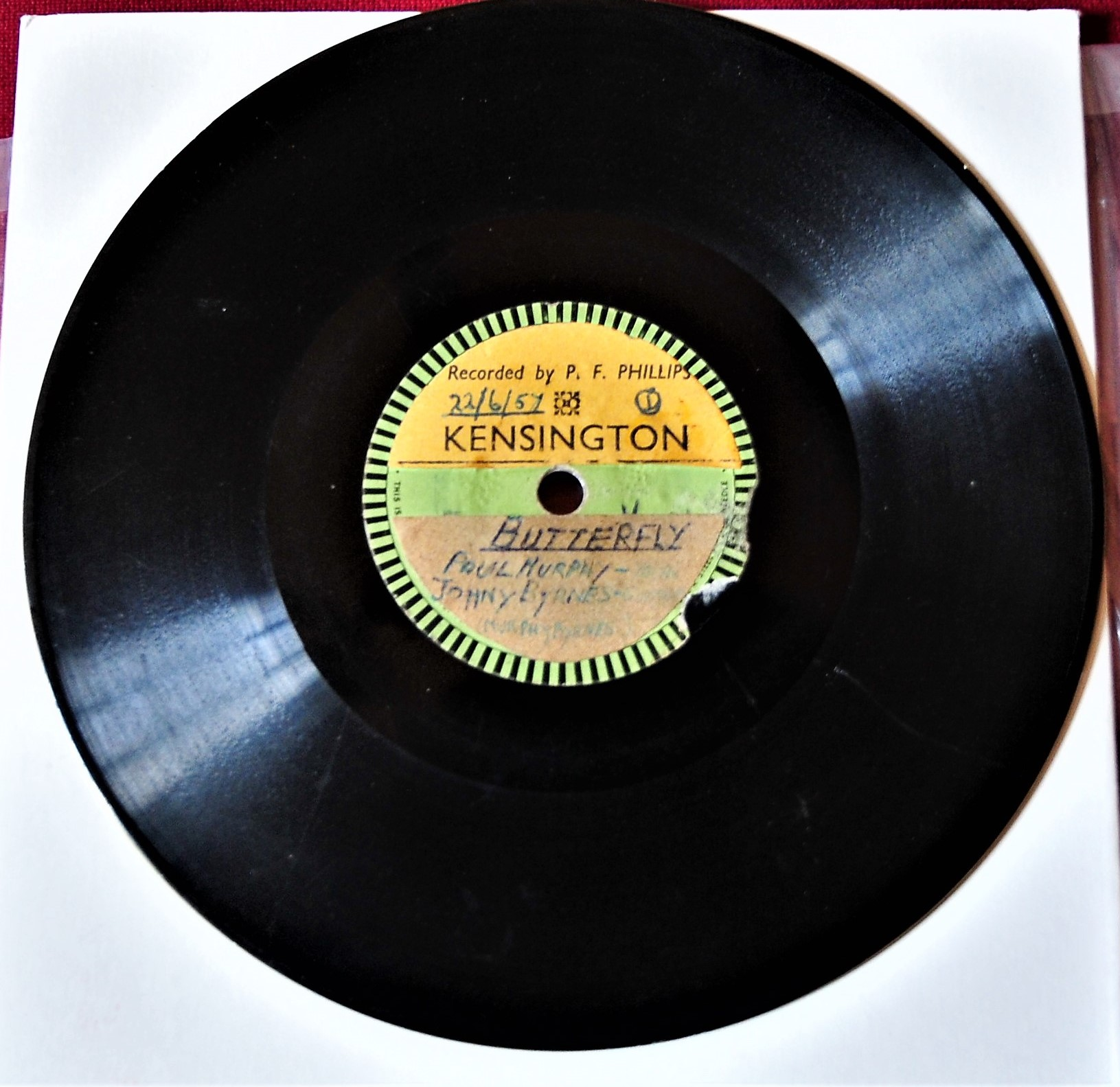
"Butterfly", recorded June 22, 1957 by Johnny "Guitar" Byrne and Paul Murphy

Johnny 'Guitar' Byrne (from Rory Storm and The Hurricanes) and singer Paul Murphy recorded a version of "Butterfly" and "She's Got it" in the studio on 22 June 1957. Byrne later played the recording to George Harrison. On 12 July 1958, a local skiffle group, The Quarrymen (Lennon, McCartney, Harrison, Lowe and Hanton) visited Phillips' studio to record two songs, although the date has been disputed, as Lowe remembered that the recording was during cold weather (October or November, 1957) with the band wearing scarves. Hanton also mentioned the cold weather in interviews, and before recording, Lennon suggested that Hanton put his scarf over the snare drum to lower the volume.

The group were surprised to see how small and technically basic the studio was, with only one microphone in the centre of the room. Phillips demanded that they pay for the recording before they set up the equipment, so each member paid 3 shillings and 6 pence, but he then asked for an extra surcharge (£1) to cover the cost of transferring the tape recording to acetate disc. As this was too expensive, Phillips said that for a cut-rate price they would not be taped first, but record directly to vinyl.

The first song they recorded was "That'll Be The Day" (sung by Lennon with harmonies by McCartney). Phillips wanted them to immediately record the next song, but Lennon and McCartney could not decide on a song for the B-side of the disc. McCartney suggested the doo-wop ballad, "In Spite of All the Danger" (by McCartney and Harrison, but sung by Lennon) even though Lowe and Hanton had never heard it before. They asked for some time to rehearse, but Phillips refused, saying, "For seventeen and six 17/6d you're not here all day".

Lowe and Hanton busked through the song, which was cut short by Phillips waving his hands to indicate that the cutting needle was getting close to the centre of the acetate. He then handed the band a fragile 78rpm 10-inch acetate record. It was later lost until Lowe rediscovered it in 1981, and planned to put it up for auction at Sotheby's, but sold it to McCartney for an undisclosed amount. McCartney later had the two songs digitally re-mastered and pressed 50 copies, giving them to friends as a Christmas present, although the two songs were released on 21 November 1995, as part of The Beatles Anthology (Anthology 1). McCartney later said, "The strangest thing for me, listening to it, is that it's like drowning, it's like your life flashing by in front of you. From the earliest things by me and John when we used to sag off school and the earliest demo tape we ever made, to the first little record we made which was a version of John singing "That'll Be The Day", and a little song of mine [and Harrison] on the other side that's never been released before."

== Later years ==
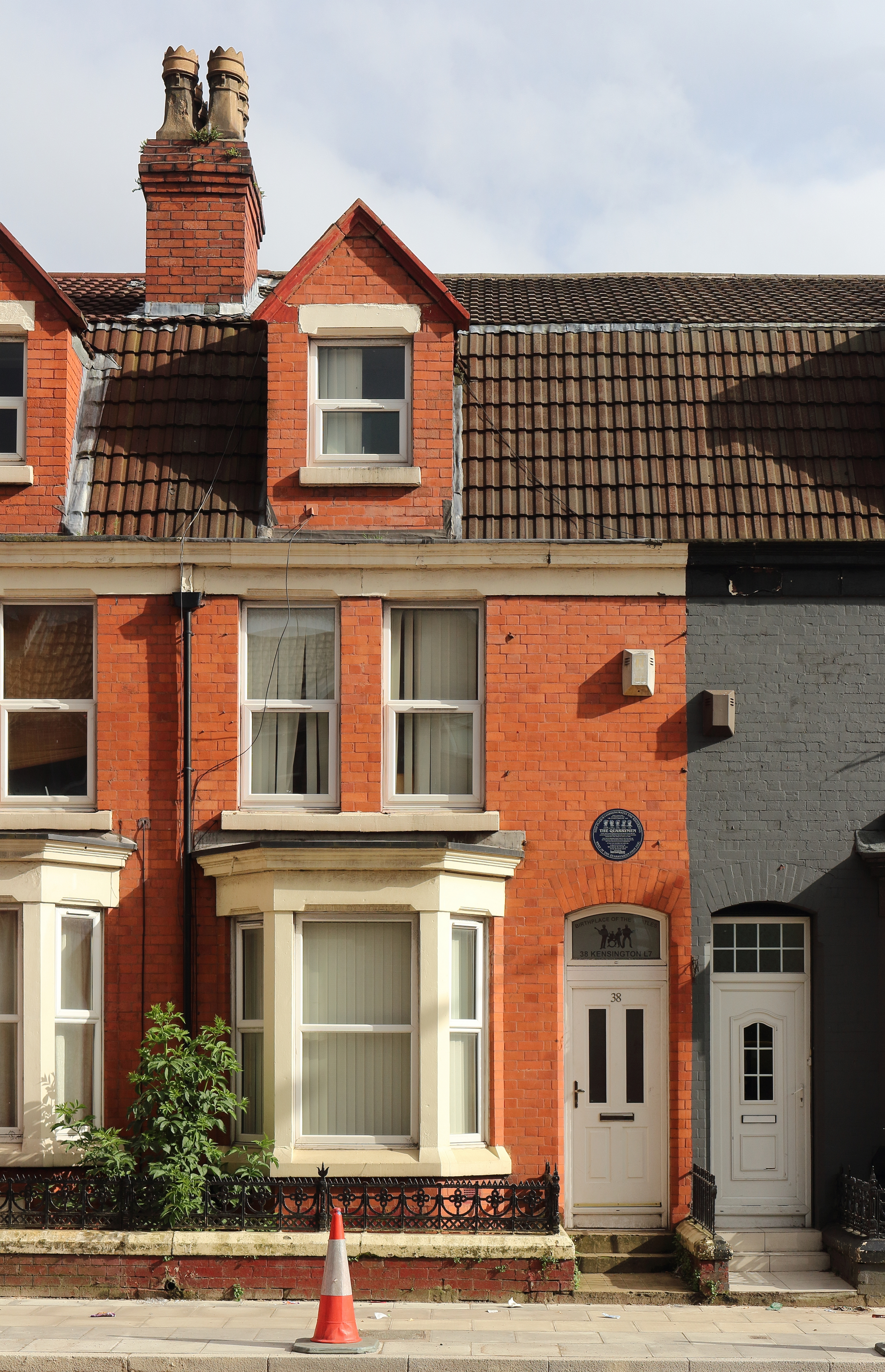
38 Kensington in 2019

Other customers of Phillips' studio included The Swinging Blue Jeans, Brian Epstein, Freddie Starr, Willy Russell, Liverpool F.C. supporters club, and players from Everton F.C. Denny Seyton and The Sabres recorded "Little Latin Lupe Lu" (Bill Medley) in the studio in 1963. Phillips closed the studio in 1969, the record shop in 1974, and died in 1984, at the Royal Liverpool Hospital. The recording of The Quarrymen acetate and the site of Phillips' Sound Recording Services was commemorated on 26 August 2005, when a Blue Plaque was unveiled by two of The Quarrymen (Lowe and Hanton) on the front of the house. Record Collector magazine valued the Beatles related disc (still owned by McCartney) at a value of £200,000 STG in their 2016 "Rare Record Price Guide." (A similar one off acetate recording by a pre famous Elvis Presley by Sam Phillips sold at auction for a similar amount previously).
