= John Lowe (musician) =

English pianist (1942–2024)

John "Duff" Lowe
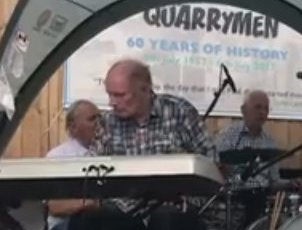
- Lowe performing with the Quarrymen in 2017

Background information
- Born: 13 April 1942; West Derby, Liverpool, Lancashire, England
- Died: 22 February 2024 (aged 81) Liverpool, Lancashire, England
- Genres: Skiffle; rock and roll
- Occupation: Musician
- Instruments: Piano; keyboards
- Years active: 1958–1960; 1994–2017
- Formerly of: The Quarrymen

John Charles "Duff" Lowe (13 April 1942 – 22 February 2024) was an English pianist. In the late 1950s, he played piano for the Quarrymen, the group who would evolve into the Beatles.

== Early career ==
Known to his friends as "Duff", Lowe had known Paul McCartney since 1953, and was invited to play piano with The Quarrymen by McCartney in February 1958. He was in The Quarrymen for two years, and was there when the band recorded a couple of songs for a vanity disc at Percy Phillips' home studio in Liverpool. The two tracks cut that day were "That'll Be the Day" and "In Spite of All the Danger". Lowe maintained possession of the tracks and, in 1981, sold the recordings to Paul McCartney. Their estimated value was around £12,000. McCartney had the record remastered and the songs appear on the Beatles' Anthology 1 album.

== Later career ==
In 1994, John Lowe played again with the Quarrymen for the album Open for Engagements. Of the 1994 lineup, only Rod Davis (guitar) and Lowe (piano) had played for the Quarrymen in the 1950s. Lowe, despite not being classified as an official member, toured with Rod Davis, Len Garry and Colin Hanton as John Lennon's Original Quarrymen at Beatles events around the world until 2017.

On 28 August 2006, the 10-inch shellac 3-track EP (33 rpm) "50 years later" was released with live versions of "Down by the riverside" by the Quarrymen's Rod Davis, Len Garry, Colin Hanton and John Duff Lowe and guest bassist Lothar Becker and guest washboard player Ednund Thielow in an edition of 10 individual pieces.

On 22 December 2014, Lowe appeared on the BBC One programme, Would I Lie to You?, in which Ricky Tomlinson revealed that Lowe had left the Quarrymen to join the young Tomlinson's band.

== Death ==
Lowe died on 22 February 2024, in Liverpool, Lancashire, England, at the age of 81.
