= Songs We Remember =

Studio album by The Quarrymen
- Released: 29 August 2004
- Recorded: Parr Street Studios, Liverpool, April 2004
- Genres: Skiffle; rock and roll
- Length: 35:13
- Label: Sony BMG
- Producer: The Quarrymen

The Quarrymen chronology
Get Back – Together (1997)	Songs We Remember (2004)	Grey Album (2012)

Songs We Remember is the third album by the reincarnated version of the Quarrymen, which was the band that eventually evolved into the Beatles. It is also the final album to feature co-founding member Eric Griffiths before his death in 2005.

== Background and content ==
The album was recorded at Liverpool's Parr Street Studios in April 2004 and was released on 29 August 2004 at the Liverpool Beatles Convention. The album is filled with covers of songs that were a regular part of the Quarrymen's early repertoire (hence the album's title). The album also includes a re-recorded version of "In Spite of All the Danger", a song that the Quarrymen (including John Lennon, Paul McCartney and George Harrison) recorded on an acetate disc in 1958 (released on the Beatles' Anthology 1 album in 1995), as well as covers of songs that were also covered or written by the Beatles.

== Track listing ==
1. "Maggie May" (2:24) (Traditional)
  - Covered by the Beatles on their 1970 album Let It Be.
2. "I'm Left, You're Right, She's Gone" (2:27) (Kesler/Taylor)
3. "Twenty Flight Rock" (1:57) (Eddie Cochran)
  - John Lennon was impressed with Paul McCartney when he showed him how to play this song in 1957.
4. "Down by the Riverside" (2:35) (Traditional)
5. "Come Go with Me" (2:49) (Clarence Quick)
  - John Lennon was singing this song when Paul McCartney first saw him on stage in 1957.
6. "Mean Woman Blues" (2:09)
7. "Puttin' On the Style" (2:17) (Lonnie Donegan)
  - A very crude recording exists of The Quarrymen performing this song live in 1957 with John Lennon on lead vocals and guitar.
8. "That'll Be the Day" (1:50) (Buddy Holly)
  - This song was recorded on a 78 RPM acetate disc in studio by The Quarrymen in 1958 with John Lennon providing lead vocals and guitar.
9. "Baby, Let's Play House" (2:23) (Arthur Gunter)
  - A very crude recording exists of The Quarrymen performing this song live in 1957 with John Lennon on lead vocals and guitar.
10. "Memphis, Tennessee" (2:22) (Chuck Berry)
  - The Beatles played this song live on BBC radio as well as on their Decca audition tape. The BBC performance was released on disc in 1994.
11. "In Spite of All the Danger" (2:10) (Paul McCartney / George Harrison)
  - This song, a McCartney / Harrison original, was recorded on a 78 RPM acetate disc in studio by The Quarrymen in 1958 with John Lennon providing lead vocals and guitar. It was the B-side to the aforementioned recording of "That'll Be The Day".
12. "All Shook Up" (2:04) (Otis Blackwell, Elvis Presley)
  - Covered by McCartney on the Run Devil Run album.
13. "Rock Island Line" (2:51)
14. "Blue Suede Shoes" (1:54) (Carl Perkins)
  - The Beatles recorded an impromptu version of this song during their Get Back Sessions in January 1969. An edited version of that performance was released on The Beatles Anthology 3 album in 1995.
15. "In My Life" (3:00) (John Lennon / Paul McCartney)
  - Cover of a Lennon / McCartney original, recorded by The Beatles in 1965, long after the dissolution of The Quarrymen.

== Personnel ==
The Quarrymen

- Len Garry – vocals, guitar
- Eric Griffiths – guitar
- Rod Davis – vocals, guitar
- Colin Hanton – drums

Additional musicians

- Sakito Shirabe – bass
- Mike Neary – piano
