= Mona Best =

English club owner (1924–1988)

- Born: 3 January 1924; Delhi, British Raj
- Died: 9 September 1988 (aged 64); Liverpool, England
- Occupation: Club owner
- Spouse(s): Donald Scanland, John Best
- Children: 3, including Pete Best

Alice Mona Best (née Shaw; 3 January 1924 – 9 September 1988) was a British music club proprietor, best known as the owner of The Casbah Coffee Club, a club in Liverpool which served as a venue for rock and roll music during the late 1950s and 1960s. Among the bands to play at The Casbah was the Beatles, for whom her son Pete Best (b. 24 November 1941) was a drummer at the time. Mona Best also had two other sons, John Rory (b. 29 January 1945), and Vincent "Roag" Best (b. 21 July 1962). It was later confirmed that Roag's father was Beatles' associate, music executive Neil Aspinall, although he was not registered as the father on Roag's birth certificate.

After moving to Liverpool from India, where she was born, Best used gambling winnings to buy a house in 1957. She later opened The Casbah Coffee Club in the cellar of the house. It was planned as a members-only club for her sons and their friends. The club was often referred to as The Casbah Club, or The Casbah. In 2006, the property was accorded a Grade II heritage listing.

Best died in 1988 after a heart attack coupled with an unspecified "long illness".

== Early life in India ==
Best was born on 3 January 1924, in Delhi, British India, to an Irish father Thomas (a major in an Irish regiment) and English mother Mary Shaw. She was the youngest of four children after Brian, Patrick and Aileen. When she was 17, her first son, Randolph Peter Scanland (later surnamed Best), was born on 24 November 1941 in Madras. Pete's biological father was marine engineer Donald Peter Scanland, who subsequently died during World War II.

Mona was training with the Red Cross when she met Johnny Best, who came from a family of sports promoters in Liverpool that once owned and ran the Liverpool Stadium. At the time of their meeting, Best was a commissioned officer serving as a Physical Training Instructor in India, and was the British Army's middleweight boxing champion. After their marriage on 7 March 1944, at St. Thomas's Cathedral, Bombay, the Bests had one child: John Rory Best (b. 29 January 1945). Less than a year later, the family sailed for four weeks to Liverpool on the Georgic, which was carrying single and married ranks who had previously been a part of General Sir William Slim's forces in southeast Asia. The ship docked in Liverpool on 25 December.

== Move to Liverpool ==
Being a part of Best's family meant Mona was accorded respect on Merseyside, which included meeting well-known sports personalities of the time and receiving preferential treatment when booking a table in a restaurant, or a seat in the theatre. The Bests lived for a short time at the Best family's large home in West Derby, which was called Ellerslie, but Mona fell out with Johnny's sister Edna, who resented her brother's choice of wife. The family then moved to a small flat on Cases Street, Liverpool (above Ma Edgerton's public house), but Mona was always looking for a large house – as she had been used to in India – instead of a smaller semi-detached house, which were prevalent in the area. After moving to a three-bedroom house in Princess Drive, Mona persuaded her parents to leave India and live with them in Liverpool.

After moving to 17 Queenscourt Road in 1948 – where the Bests lived for nine years – Rory saw a large Victorian house for sale at 8 Hayman's Green in 1954, and told his mother about it. This house was built around 1860 and had previously been owned by the West Derby Conservative Club. Unlike many other family houses in Liverpool, it was set back from the road, had 15 bedrooms and an acre of land. All the rooms were painted dark green or brown, and the garden was totally overgrown. In a widely repeated story (which Beatles historian Mark Lewisohn believes to be false), Mona managed to afford this mansion by pawning all her jewellery and allegedly putting the proceeds on a rank outsider running in the 1954 Epsom Derby horse race. The horse, Never Say Die ridden by Lester Piggott in his first Derby victory, came home at 33-1.

Mona decorated the living room in an Oriental style, which reflected her own upbringing in India. She had previously tried to interest her husband in other houses, including a Formby lighthouse, a windmill in St. Helens and a circular house in Southport, which John disliked and rejected.

From 1961–62, Neil Aspinall became good friends with Pete and subsequently rented a room in the Bests' home. Aspinall became romantically involved with Mona, and during this period, he fathered a child by Mona: Vincent "Roag" Best. Roag was born on 21 July 1962, and just three weeks later, on 16 August 1962, Pete was dismissed from the Beatles. Roag's birth certificate was registered on 31 August 1962, stating his name as "Vincent Rogue [sic] Best" and naming John Best as his father, even though Mona and Johnny had separated in the late 1950s or early 1960s.

== The Casbah Coffee Club ==
The music area of The Casbah Coffee Club as it looks today

Mona came up with the idea of the club after watching a television report about The 2i's Coffee Bar in London's Soho, where several singers had been discovered. She decided to open The Casbah Coffee Club – which was located in her cellar – on 29 August 1959, for young people to meet and listen to the popular music of the day. Mona charged half a crown annually for membership – to "keep out the rough elements" – and served soft drinks, snacks, cakes, and coffee from an espresso machine, which no other club had at that time. The current pop records were played on a small Dansette record player, which amplified them through a speaker of 3 inches (76 mm).

Mona had booked the Les Stewart Quartet to play the opening night with George Harrison on guitar, but they cancelled the booking after Stewart and Ken Brown had a quarrel. Stewart was angry that Brown had missed a rehearsal, because Brown was helping Mona to decorate the club. As 300 membership cards had already been sold, Harrison said that he had two friends in a band called the Quarrymen, who would play instead.

John Lennon, Paul McCartney, Stuart Sutcliffe, and Harrison went to the club to arrange the booking, to which Mona agreed, but she said she needed to finish painting the club first. All four took up brushes and helped Mona to finish painting the walls with spiders, dragons, rainbows, stars, and a beetle, which still survive. Lennon was short-sighted, mistaking gloss for emulsion paint, which took a long time to dry in the dark, damp cellar. Cynthia Powell, later Lennon's wife, painted a silhouette of Lennon on the wall, which is also still intact.

The Quarrymen played a series of seven Saturday night concerts in The Casbah for 15 shillings each, from 29 August to October 1959, featuring Brown, Lennon, McCartney and Harrison, but without a drummer, or a PA system. The opening night concert was attended by about 300 local teenagers, but as the cellar had no air-conditioning, and people were dancing, the temperature rose until it became hard to breathe. As there was no amplification, Lennon later persuaded Mona to hire a young amateur guitar player called Harry to play a short set before the Quarrymen, but this was only so they could use his 40-watt amplifier. After the success of the first night, Mona gave the Quarrymen a residency, and paid the whole group £3 a night (equivalent to £100 in 2025). Every Saturday thereafter, queues lengthened onto the street, which was financially good for Mona, as she charged one shilling admission on top of the annual membership fee.

Pete was studying at the Collegiate Grammar School when he decided he wanted to be in a music group, so Mona bought him a drum kit from Blackler's music store and Best formed his own band, the Black Jacks. Chas Newby joined the group, as did Brown, but only after he had left the Quarrymen.

The reason for Brown's exit from the group was that he turned up on the seventh Saturday night of the Quarrymen residency at The Casbah with the flu, so Mona ordered him upstairs to the Bests' living room to rest. This caused a massive quarrel with the rest of the group when Mona came to pay them, as they wanted Brown's money to be shared amongst the three of them, since Brown had not played. Mona refused, and so the Quarrymen angrily cancelled their residency and stormed out. Colin Manley, from the Remo Four, was also given a booking to play in the club, which was the only venue that young amateur bands could play at the time. Other groups like the Searchers and Gerry and the Pacemakers later played in the club. The Black Jacks became the resident group at The Casbah, although the Quarrymen occasionally played there again and often visited. It was in The Casbah Club that Lennon and McCartney convinced Sutcliffe to buy a Höfner president bass guitar and join the Quarrymen.

Although the membership list later spiralled to over a thousand, Mona closed the club on 24 June 1962, with the Beatles as the last group to perform.

In 2006, the Bests' ex-coal cellar was awarded Grade II listed building status by English Heritage. It has now been opened as a tourist attraction in Liverpool, along with Lennon's and McCartney's previous homes.

=== The Beatles ===
When Pete became a member of the Beatles, Mona repeatedly tried to get the group a lunchtime residency at The Cavern Club by talking to the owner, Ray McFall, but they were turned down, as The Cavern had a jazz-only policy at the time. This was soon to change, as rock became more profitable than jazz. Brian Epstein later wanted to manage the group, and Mona was asked for her advice, and although she had her own plans for the group, she concluded that Epstein would be good for them over time.

After the Beatles signed a management contract with Epstein, Mona did not relinquish her control over them, as they had been using her telephone to call agents, and frequently slept over in her living room between concerts. She reportedly harassed Epstein about the quality of their bookings, and his management of them, which led to Epstein never referring to her by name, but always calling her "that woman". One musician commented that if Mona said it was a Sunday when it was Tuesday, one would be forced to agree with her.

After Best, McCartney and Harrison were deported from Hamburg in November 1960, Mona made numerous phone calls to Hamburg to recover the group's equipment, which she eventually managed to do. Mona wrote to Granada Television in 1961, in an attempt to gain the group a booking on the television programme People And Places, but was sent a letter telling her that they would contact her in the future. After Pete had been dismissed from the Beatles on 16 August 1962, Mona was later quoted by biographer Hunter Davies as saying:

He'd [Pete] been their manager before Brian [Epstein] arrived, did the bookings and collected the money. I'd looked upon them as friends. I'd helped them so much, got them bookings, lending them money. I fed them when they were hungry. I was far more interested in them than their own parents.

== Later years ==
In 1967, when the Beatles had to pose for the photograph for the cover of Sgt. Pepper's Lonely Hearts Club Band, Lennon asked Mona if he could borrow the war medals her father had been given in India to wear for the photo session. Although still upset at the way Pete had been dismissed from the Beatles, Mona reluctantly agreed, and the medals were later returned, along with a Cash Box trophy that is in the letter 'L' of THE BEATLES flower-sign on the cover. Mona never opened another club or engaged in another business venture, although she did have paying guests at her house, which she shared with her bed-ridden mother and her sons after she and her husband Johnny had parted. Mona died in a Liverpool hospital after a heart attack coupled with an unspecified "long illness" on 9 September 1988 aged 64.

== Notes ==
Roag Best, Jr., (Mona's grandson) during an August, 2024 visit to the Casbah Coffee Club, confirmed the horse racing story.
