= Casbah Coffee Club =

Music venue in Liverpool, England

Coordinates: 53.4324°N 2.9120°W

Casbah Club
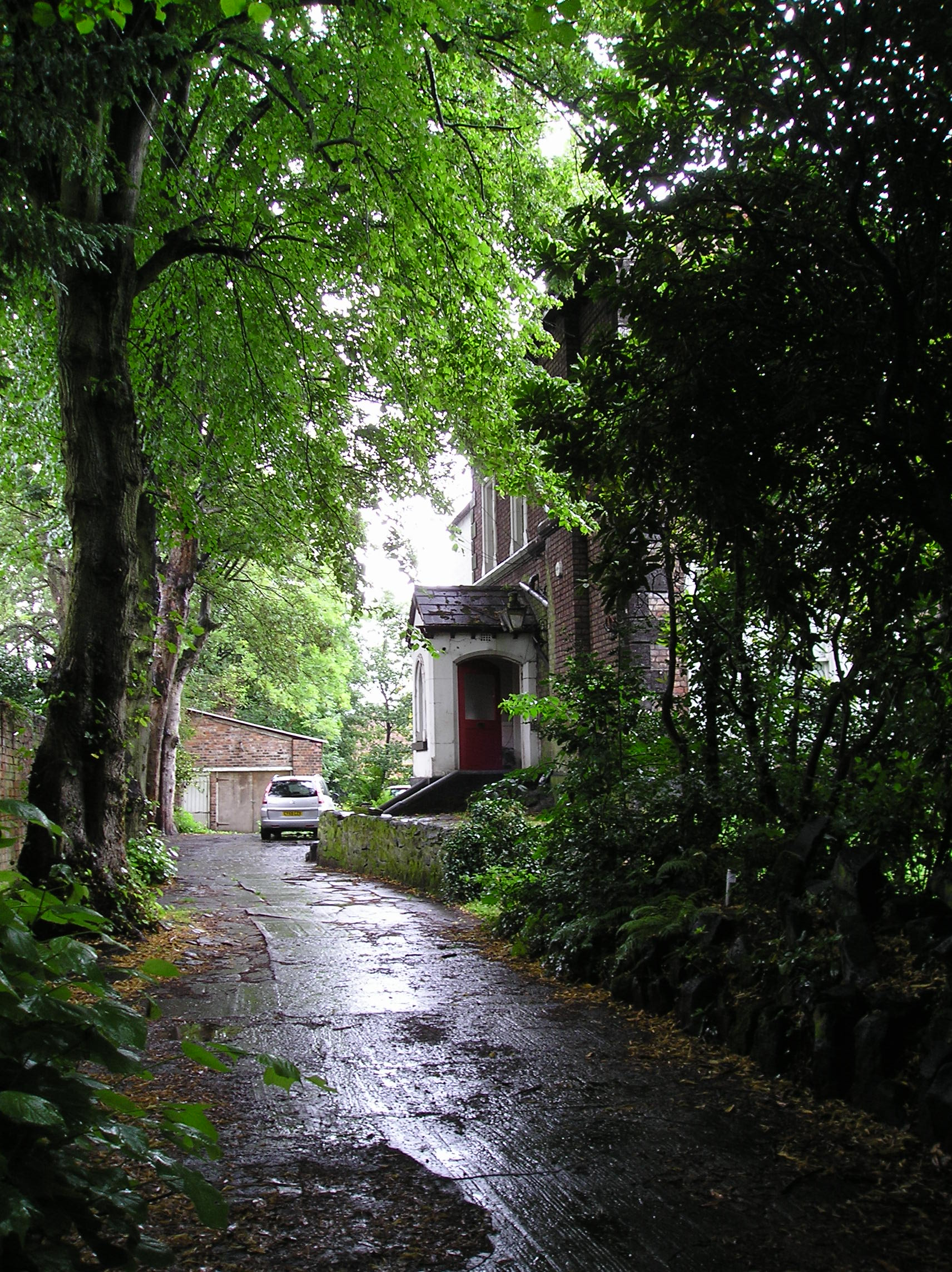
- Interactive map of Casbah Club
- Location: 8 Haymans Green, Liverpool, L12 7JG
- Owner: Mona Best
- Capacity: 300

Construction
- Opened: 29 August 1959
- Closed: 24 June 1962

Website

Listed Building – Grade II
- Official name: Casbah Club
- Designated: 15 September 2006
- Reference no.: 1391759

The Casbah Coffee Club, officially Casbah Club, was a rock and roll music venue in the West Derby area of Liverpool, England, that operated from 1959 to 1962. Started by Mona Best, mother of early Beatles drummer Pete Best, in the cellar of the family home, the Casbah was planned as a members-only club for her sons Pete and Rory and their friends, to meet and listen to the popular music of the day. Mona came up with the idea of the club after watching a TV report about the 2i's Coffee Bar in London's Soho where several singers had been discovered.

The Quarrymen—John Lennon, Paul McCartney, George Harrison, and Ken Brown—went to the club to arrange their first booking, to which Mona agreed, but said she needed to finish painting the club first. All four took up brushes and helped Mona to finish painting the walls with spiders, dragons, rainbows and stars. In addition to the four boys' artistic contributions, Cynthia Powell, later to become Cynthia Lennon, painted a silhouette of John on the wall, which can still be seen today. The group often played at the Casbah as other venues, like the Cavern Club, had a jazz-only policy at that time. The cellar—with its original decoration—still exists.

In 2006, Culture Minister David Lammy announced that the Bests' ex-coal cellar was to be given Grade II listed building status and a blue plaque, after being recommended by English Heritage. It was opened as a tourist attraction in Liverpool, along with McCartney and Lennon's previous homes at 20 Forthlin Road and 251 Menlove Avenue respectively.

In 2024, the Casbah was turned into holiday flats, available to rent on Airbnb.

== History ==
Mona Shaw was born on 3 January 1924, in Delhi, and married John Best in India before moving with him and their two children, Pete Best (b. 1941) and Rory Best (b. 1944) back to Liverpool in 1945, where they lived in various houses. After moving to Queenscourt Road in 1948—where the Bests lived for nine years—Mona was told by Rory about a large Victorian house for sale at 8 Hayman's Green, in 1954. The house (built around 1860 by an unknown architect), had previously been owned by the West Derby Conservative Club, and was unlike many other family dwellings in Liverpool, as it was set back from the road, had 15 bedrooms and 1 acre (4,000 m^{2}) of land. All the rooms were painted dark green or brown, the garden was totally overgrown, and the cellar was used for storing coal.

=== The Casbah ===
McCartney and Lennon playing on the opening night of the Casbah Coffee Club

Mona came up with the idea of the club after watching a TV report about the 2i's Coffee Bar in London's Soho, where several singers had been discovered. She decided to open the club, which was located in her cellar, on 29 August 1959, for her sons, their friends and young people to meet and listen to the popular music of the day, unlike the Cavern Club, which had a jazz-only policy at that time. Mona charged half a crown annually for membership—to "keep out the rough elements"—and served soft drinks, snacks, cakes, and coffee from an espresso machine, which no other club had at that time. Records were played on a small Dansette record player, which amplified them through a 3" speaker. Mona had booked the Les Stewart Quartet to play the opening night with Harrison on guitar, but they cancelled the booking after Stewart and Ken Brown had a quarrel. Stewart was angry that Brown had missed a rehearsal, because Brown was helping Mona to decorate the club. As 300 membership cards had already been sold, Harrison said that he had two friends in a band called the Quarrymen who would play instead. Lennon, McCartney and Harrison went to the club to arrange the booking, to which Mona agreed, but said she needed to finish painting the club first. All four took up brushes and helped Mona to finish painting the walls with spiders, dragons, rainbows and stars, but as Lennon was short-sighted, he mistook gloss for emulsion paint, which took a long time to dry in the dark, damp cellar. Cynthia Powell, later the wife of Lennon, painted a silhouette of him on the wall, which is also still there.

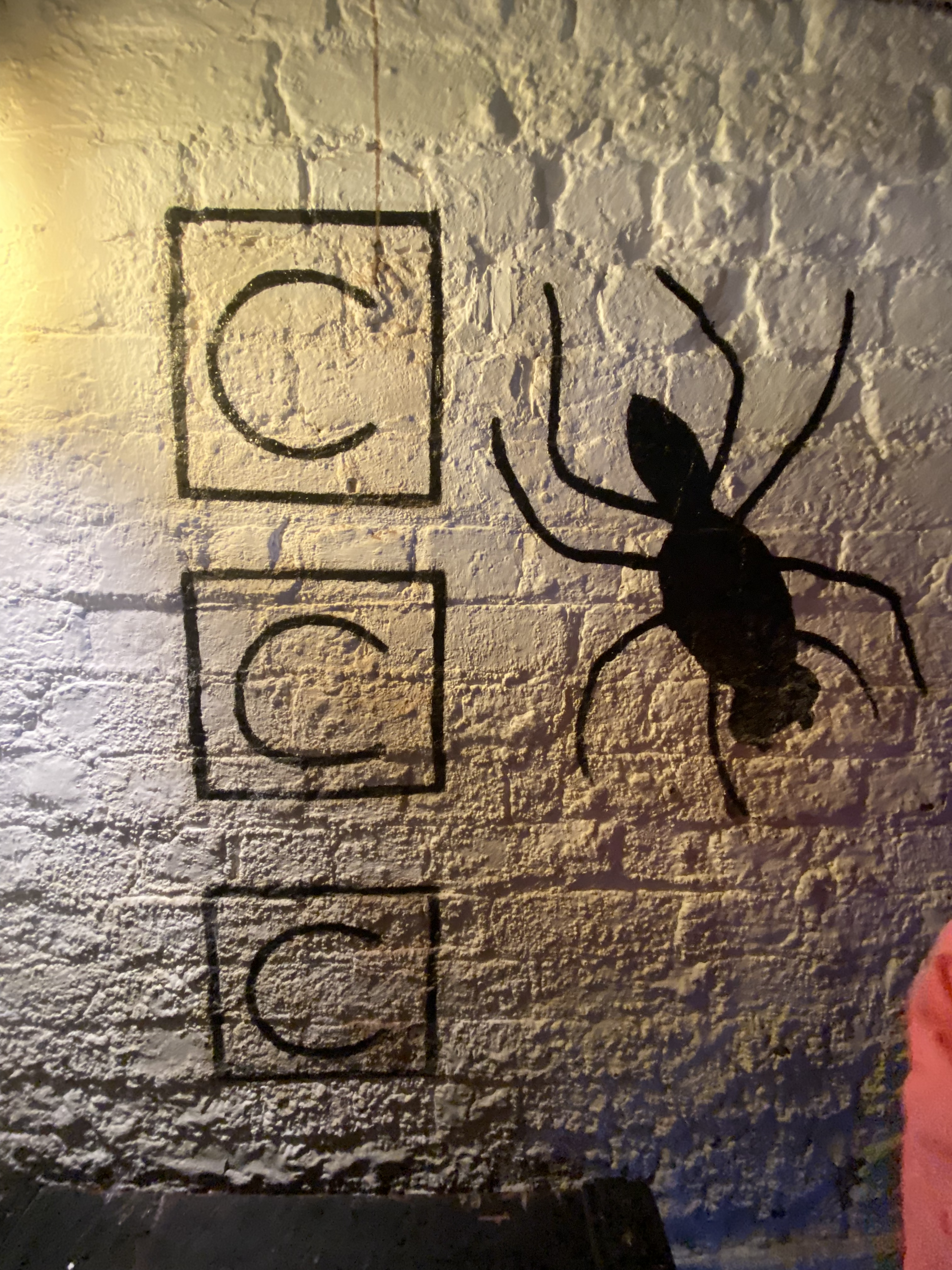
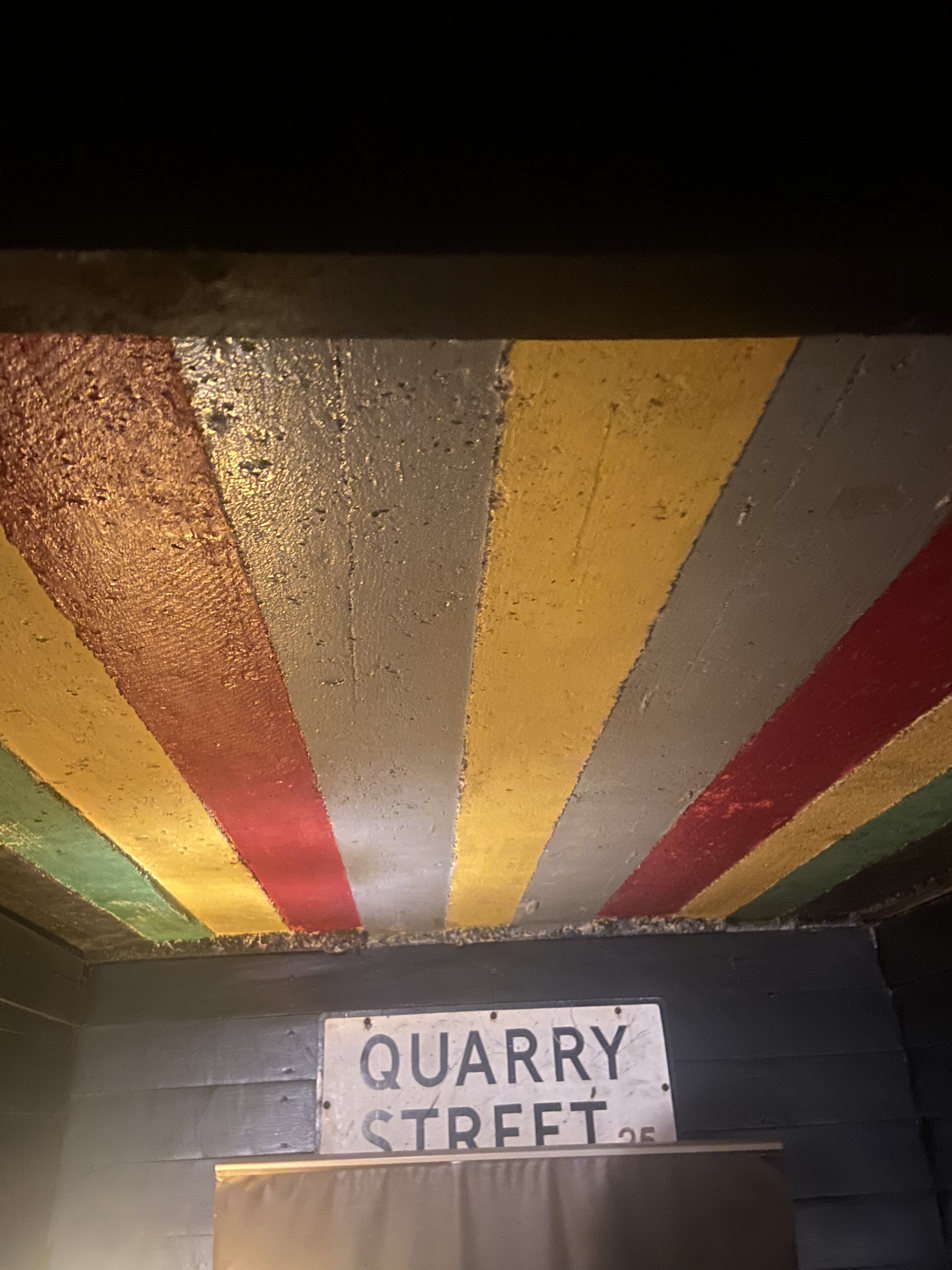
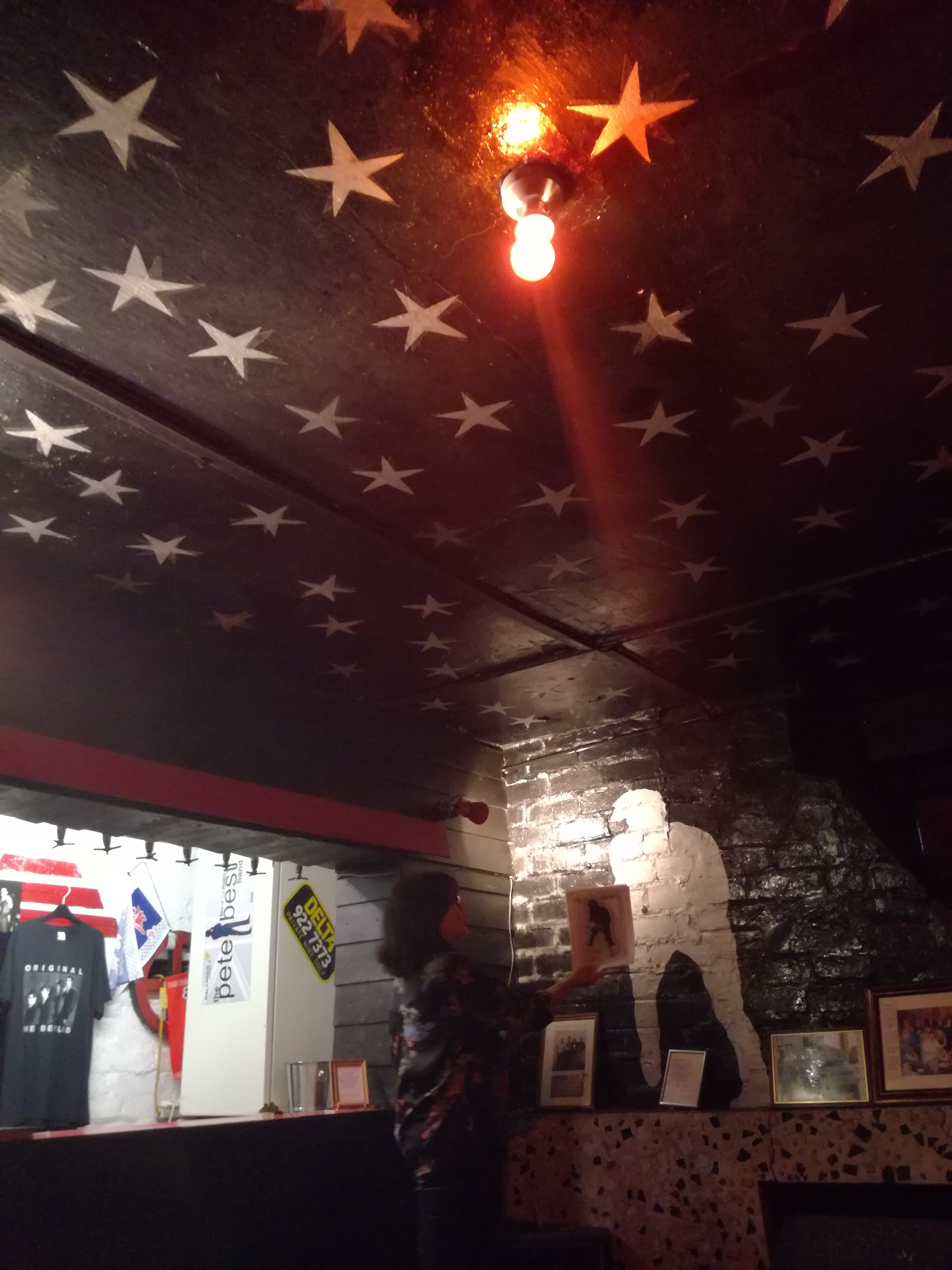
Spiders, rainbows, and stars painted by Mona Best, Lennon, McCartney, and Harrison. The silhouette of John Lennon was painted by Cynthia Powell, later Cynthia Lennon.

The Quarrymen played a series of seven Saturday night concerts in the Casbah for 15 shillings each, starting on 29 August to October 1959, featuring Lennon, McCartney, Harrison and Brown, but without a drummer, and only one microphone connected to the club's small PA system. The opening night concert was attended by about 300 local teenagers, but as the cellar had no air-conditioning, and people were dancing, the temperature rose until it became hard to breathe. After the success of the first night, Mona gave the Quarrymen a residency, and paid the whole group £3 a night. Every Saturday thereafter, queues lengthened onto the street, which was financially good for Mona, as she charged one shilling admission on top of the annual membership fee. As there was no amplification, Lennon later persuaded Mona to hire a young amateur guitar player called Harry to play a short set before the Quarrymen, but this was only so they could use his 40-Watt amplifier.

Pete Best was studying at the Collegiate Grammar School when he decided he wanted to be in a music group, so Mona bought him a drum kit from Blacklers' music department and Best formed his own band; the Black Jacks, who later played in the Casbah. Chas Newby joined the group, as did Ken Brown, but only after he had left the Quarrymen. The reason for Brown's exit from the group was that he turned up on the seventh Saturday night of the Quarrymen residency at the Casbah with the flu, so Mona ordered him upstairs to the Best's living room to rest. This caused a massive quarrel with the rest of the group when Mona came to pay them, as they wanted Brown's money to be shared amongst the three of them, as Brown had not played. Mona refused, so the Quarrymen angrily cancelled their residency and stormed out.

Colin Manley from the Remo Four was also given a booking to play in the club, which was the only venue that young amateur bands could play at the time. Other artists and groups like Cilla Black, Rory Storm and the Hurricanes, the Searchers and Gerry & the Pacemakers later played in the club. The Black Jacks became the resident group at the Casbah, although the Quarrymen occasionally played there again and often visited. It was in the Casbah Club that Lennon and McCartney persuaded Stuart Sutcliffe to buy a Höfner 500/5 model—known in Europe as a President bass—with the money he had won in the John Moores art exhibition. Even though the membership list later spiralled to over a thousand, Mona closed the club on 24 June 1962, with the Beatles as the last group to perform.

== Heritage status ==
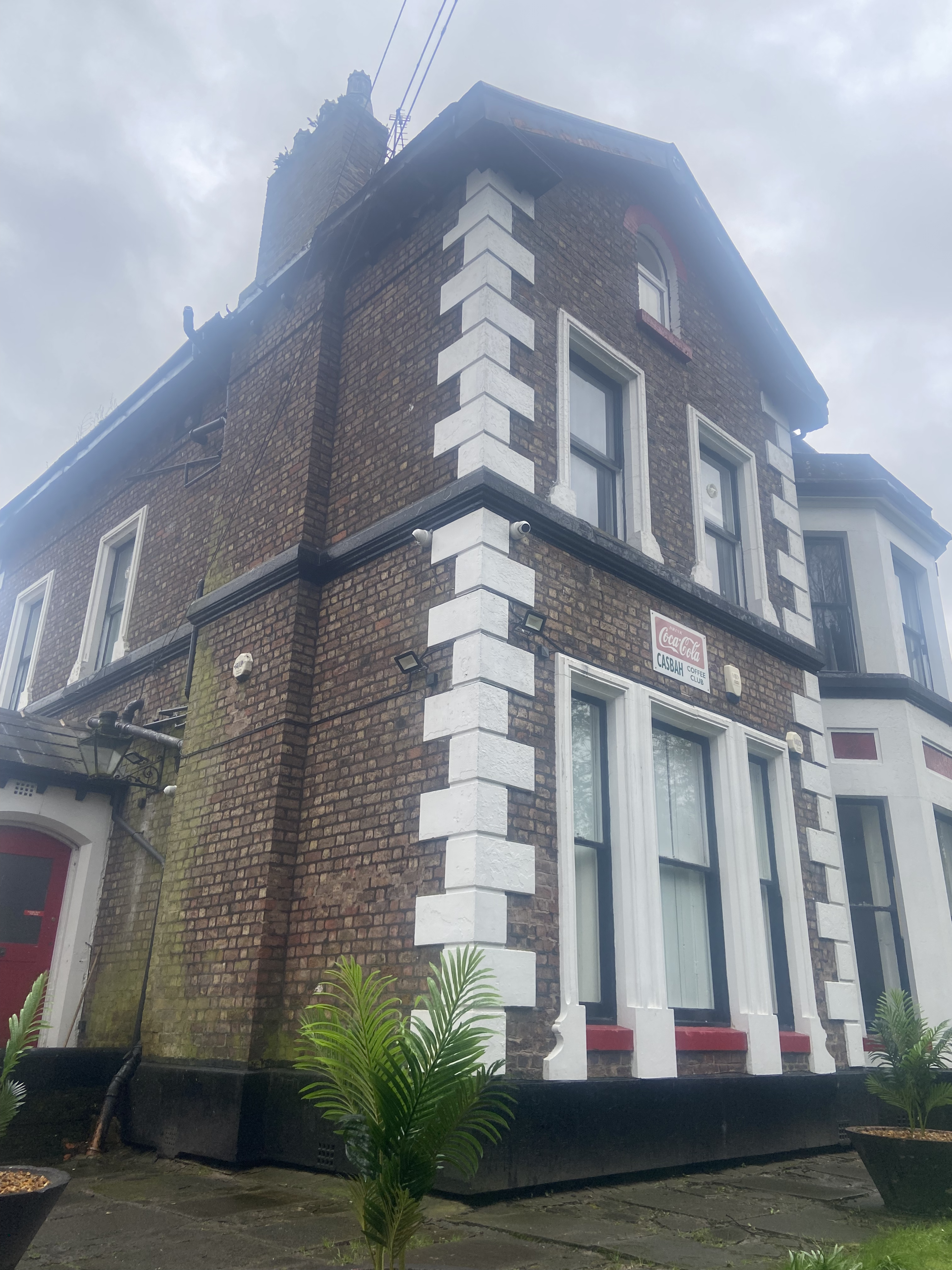
The Casbah Club pictured in 2024

In 2006, Culture Minister David Lammy announced that the Bests' ex-coal cellar was to be given Grade II listed building status and a blue plaque, after being recommended by English Heritage. It has now been opened as a tourist attraction in Liverpool, along with McCartney and Lennon's previous homes at 20 Forthlin Road, and 251 Menlove Avenue respectively. The club is 3.5 miles (5.6 km) from the Liverpool city centre, and only booked groups of visitors are accepted. McCartney was quoted as saying, "I think it's a good idea to let people know about the Casbah. They know about the Cavern, they know about some of those things, but the Casbah was the place where all that started. We helped paint it and stuff. We looked upon it as our personal club."

English Heritage's Head of Heritage Protection in the North of England, Bob Hawkins, stated: "The basement Casbah Club rooms are historically significant because they represent tangible evidence of The Beatles' formation, their growth in popularity and their enduring cultural influence throughout the world. The club survives in a remarkably well-preserved condition since its closure in 1962, with wall and ceiling paintings of spiders, dragons, rainbows and stars by original band members along with 1960s musical equipment, amplifiers and original chairs. We know of no other survival like it in Liverpool or indeed anywhere else."

== See also ==
- List of English Heritage properties
- Grade II listed buildings in Liverpool-L12
- Liverpool Beatles Museum, run by Mona's son Roag Best
