= Fatty Arbuckle's =

American-themed restaurant

- Industry: Restaurant
- Founded: 1983 (established); 1991 (first franchise opened)
- Founders: Pete Shotton, Bill Turner
- Defunct: 2006
- Headquarters: Manchester, England

Fatty Arbuckle's American Diners (now rebranded as simply Arbuckle's) was an American-themed restaurant chain in the United Kingdom. The Manchester-based business was co-founded in 1983 by Pete Shotton, an associate of the Beatles. It focused on large portions at cheap prices. The name refers to Hollywood director and star of silent movies Roscoe "Fatty" Arbuckle.

== History ==
The first Fatty Arbuckle's restaurant was opened in 1983 in Plymouth by friends Pete Shotton and Bill Turner. A second was opened in Bournemouth in 1985. Turner died in 1993, and Shotton acquired his stake in the business.

The first franchise restaurant was opened in 1991. The franchising model led to a rapid expansion of the chain. By 1995, there were 22 outlets and by 1996 there were over 30, including a flagship restaurant in London's West End. Around two-thirds of the restaurants were franchises. In 1997, it became the largest American-style restaurant chain in the UK, with 42 outlets.

As burgers accounted for 70 percent of the restaurants' sales, income was badly affected by the BSE outbreak in 1996. Shotton sold his majority stake to the private equity firm Alchemy Partners for £5 million. By focussing on more profitable leisure park sites rather than the high street, the chain expanded to its peak of 58 restaurants by 1999.

In 2000, in an attempt to appeal to more health-conscious diners, the chain dropped "Fatty" from the name and rebranded as simply "Arbuckle's".

With debts of £6.8 million, the chain entered receivership in July 2000. Most of the outlets closed, but the brand name and ten locations were purchased by investment company Noble House Group. They failed to turn the business around, and the remaining ten locations closed in 2006.

Two former managers purchased the rights to the name and opened a new Arbuckle's in Downham Market, Norfolk in 2008. In 2017, a second restaurant was opened at a leisure park in Ely, Cambridgeshire.

In 2018, the business was sold to an employee ownership trust.
