= Nigel Walley =

Musical artist (born 1941)

- Born: Christopher Nigel Walley; 30 June 1941 (age 84); Liverpool, England
- Genres: Skiffle
- Occupations: Musician; manager; golfer
- Instrument: Tea-chest bass
- Years active: 1956–1957

Christopher Nigel Walley (born 30 June 1941) is an English former golfer and tea-chest bass player and manager, best known for his association with band the Quarrymen, the precursor of the Beatles which included John Lennon. His surname has often been spelt incorrectly as 'Whalley' in numerous books and on web pages.

== Early life ==
Walley's father was Chief Superintendent Harry Walley, who was the head of Liverpool's Police 'A' Division. The Walley family lived in Vale Road, Liverpool, which was at the back of Lennon's home at 251 Menlove Avenue, belonging to his aunt and guardian, Mimi Smith. Walley was the eldest of three other siblings, Clive, Angela & Carol. Walley and Lennon became friends at the age of five, even though Walley and Pete Shotton (who also lived in Vale Road) went to Mosspits Lane Infant/Junior School, while Lennon and Ivan Vaughan attended Dovedale Infant School. (Lennon had originally attended Mosspits Lane School, but was expelled for bullying another infant, Polly Hipshaw.) Walley and Lennon both went on to sing in the Sunday school and church choir at St. Peter's Church, Woolton. Walley left Bluecoat Grammar School at the age of 15 years to become an apprentice golf professional at the Lee Park Golf Club, in Liverpool.

== The Quarrymen and management ==
Lennon formed The Quarrymen in the summer of 1956, with friends and school friends. Walley was one of four tea-chest bass players in the fledgling line-up of the group, the others being Vaughan, Bill Smith and Len Garry. Playing tea-chest bass with the group from 1956 to 1958, Walley lost the tea chest when he left it at a bus stop after being threatened by two aggressive local boys. He then decided to become the group's manager, at Lennon's request. On 2 July 1957, Walley and Lennon were turned down when they tried to sign on as ship's stewards (as Lennon's father had been), in the seamen's employment office at Pier Head, Liverpool. Lennon's aunt was telephoned, and the plan was dismissed out of hand.

Although Walley did not secure the group many paid engagements, he sent flyers to local theatres and ballrooms, put up posters designed by Lennon, paid for small advertisements in the Liverpool Echo and the Liverpool Daily Post, as well as business cards to be displayed in local shop windows: "COUNTRY. WESTERN. ROCK N' ROLL. SKIFFLE - THE QUARRY MEN - OPEN FOR ENGAGEMENTS - Please Call Nigel Walley, Tel.Gateacre 1715". He secured two intermission concerts at the Gaumont cinema (near Penny Lane) on Saturday afternoons, and for the group to perform at parties and skiffle contests in the Liverpool area. Whilst playing golf with Dr. Joseph Sytner, Walley asked him if his son, Alan Sytner, could book The Quarrymen at The Cavern Club, in Mathew Street, which was one of three jazz clubs he managed. After passing on the information to his son, Sytner suggested that the group should play at the golf club first, so as to assess their talent. After playing at the golf club audition, he phoned Walley a week later and offered the group an interlude spot on 7 August 1957, playing skiffle between the performances of three jazz groups at The Cavern Club.

Paul McCartney made his debut with the group on Friday, 18 October 1957, at a Conservative Club social—organised by Walley—which was held at the New Clubmoor Hall in the Norris Green section of Liverpool. Lennon and McCartney wore cream-coloured sports jackets, which were paid for by Walley, and he collected half a crown per week from each member until the bill was settled. McCartney later clashed with Walley about payment: "The funny thing was that whenever Paul [McCartney] was around he used to say, 'Don't pay anyone who's not playing' ... He didn't really rate managers". Walley stopped managing the group after his family moved from Vale Road to New Brighton on the opposite bank of the River Mersey to Liverpool, which was too far to be practical, and because he had contracted tuberculosis.

Walley kept in contact until Lennon's death in 1980: "John and I always stayed in touch after he was a Beatle – I would go round to his flat or house and we'd talk. ... He never forget any of the old gang … in fact towards the end of his life he was becoming more and more nostalgic". Walley's name has been often mistakenly written as "Whalley" in many books and on numerous web pages, but, as he has often stated, there is no 'H' in the spelling of it.

=== Death of Julia Lennon ===
On the evening of 15 July 1958, Walley went to visit Lennon at his aunt's house, finding Julia Lennon (Lennon's mother) and Lennon's aunt talking by the front gate of Menlove Avenue. Unfortunately, Lennon was not there, as he was at his mother's house at 1 Blomfield Road. Walley then accompanied Lennon's mother to a bus stop further north along Menlove Avenue, with her telling jokes along the way. At about 9:30, Walley left her to walk up Vale Road and she crossed Menlove Avenue to the central reservation between two traffic lanes, which was lined with hedges that covered disused tram tracks. Five seconds later, Walley heard "a loud thud", and turned to see her body "flying through the air"—which landed about 100 feet from where she had been hit. Lennon refused to talk to Walley for months afterwards, which left Walley with the feeling that Lennon held him responsible.

== Golf professional ==
Walley became one of the youngest golf professionals in the UK, working at the Wrotham Heath Golf Club in Borough Green, Kent, and then in Semmering, Austria, in 1961. Later he ran a golf club in Lima, Peru.
