= The Quarrymen =

British skiffle/rock and roll band

- The Quarrymen performing in Rosebery Street, Liverpool, on 22 June 1957. Left to right: Hanton, Griffiths, Lennon, Garry, Shotton and Davis.

Background information
- Also known as: Johnny and the Moondogs; Japage 3; Long John and the Silver Beatles
- Origin: Liverpool, England
- Genres: Skiffle; rock and roll
- Years active: 1956–1960; 1992-1994; 1997-Present
- Labels: Griffin; Quarrymen Records; Sony BMG
- Spinoffs: The Beatles
- Members: Colin Hanton; Rod Davis; David Bedford; Henry Duff Lowe
- Past members: John Lennon; Eric Griffiths; Pete Shotton; Bill Smith; Nigel Walley; Ivan Vaughan; Len Garry; Paul McCartney; George Harrison; John Duff Lowe; Ken Brown; Stuart Sutcliffe; Chas Newby
- Website: originalquarrymen.co.uk

The Quarrymen (also written as "The Quarry Men") are a British skiffle and rock and roll band, formed by John Lennon in Liverpool in 1956, which evolved into the Beatles in 1960. Originally consisting of Lennon and several school friends, the Quarrymen took their name from a line in the school song of their school, the Quarry Bank High School. Lennon's mother, Julia, taught her son to play the banjo, showed Lennon and Eric Griffiths how to tune their guitars in a similar way to the banjo, and taught them simple chords and songs.

Lennon founded a skiffle group with his close friend Pete Shotton and after a week of gaining new members, they named themselves the Quarrymen. The Quarrymen played at parties, school dances, cinemas and amateur skiffle contests before Paul McCartney joined in early July 1957. George Harrison joined in early 1958 at McCartney's recommendation, though Lennon initially resisted because he felt Harrison (14 when he was introduced to Lennon) was too young. McCartney and Harrison attended the Liverpool Institute.

The group made an amateur recording in 1958, performing Buddy Holly's "That'll Be the Day" and "In Spite of All the Danger", a song written by McCartney and Harrison. The group moved towards rock and roll, causing several of the original members to leave. This left Lennon, McCartney, and Harrison, who performed under several other names, including Johnny and the Moondogs, Japage 3, and Long John and the Silver Beatles before returning to the Quarrymen name in 1959. In 1960, the group changed their name to "the Beatles".

In 1997, the four surviving original (non-Beatles) members of the Quarrymen reunited to perform at the 40th anniversary celebrations of the garden fête performance at which Lennon had first met McCartney. Since 1998, they have performed in countries outside the UK and released four albums. Two original members still perform as the Quarrymen.

== History ==
=== Formation and early performances ===
In the mid-1950s, there was a revival in the United Kingdom of the musical form "skiffle" that had originated in the United States and had been popular in the US in the 1920s, '30s and '40s. In addition to its popularity among British teenagers as music to listen to, it also spawned a craze of teenage boys starting their own groups to perform the music. One of the primary attractions was that it did not require great musical skills or expensive instruments to be played. Early British skiffle was played by traditional jazz musicians, with the most successful British proponent of the genre in the 1950s being Lonnie Donegan. The Quarrymen's initial repertoire included several songs that Donegan had recorded. When Lennon wanted to try making music himself, he and fellow Quarry Bank school friend, Griffiths, took guitar lessons in Hunt's Cross, Liverpool, although Lennon gave up the lessons soon after, as they were based on theory and not actual playing.

As Griffiths already knew how to play the banjo, Lennon's mother showed them how to tune the top four strings of their guitars to the same notes as a banjo, and taught them the chords of D, C, and D7, as well as the Fats Domino song, "Ain't That a Shame". They practised at Lennon's aunt's house (called Mendips) at 251 Menlove Avenue where Lennon lived, or at Griffiths' house in Halewood Drive. They learned how to play Lonnie Donegan's "Rock Island Line", "Jump Down Turn Around (Pick a Bale of Cotton)", "Alabamy Bound" and "Cumberland Gap", and later learned how to play two of Elvis Presley's first hits, "That's All Right" and "Mean Woman Blues".

Lennon and Griffiths decided to form a skiffle group in November 1956. This initial line-up consisted of Lennon and Griffiths on guitars, Pete Shotton on washboard, and school friend Bill Smith on tea-chest bass. Both Lennon and Shotton have been credited with coining the name Quarrymen after a line in their school's song: 'Quarrymen, old before our birth. Straining each muscle and sinew.' The choice of name was tongue-in-cheek as Lennon regarded the reference in the school song to "straining each muscle and sinew" as risible. Smith's tenure in the band was extremely short, and he was replaced in quick succession by Nigel Walley, Ivan Vaughan, and Len Garry throughout late 1956 and early 1957. Also during this period, drummer Colin Hanton and banjo player Rod Davis joined the group. This group of Lennon, Griffiths, Shotton, Garry, Hanton, and Davis formed the first stable line-up of the group.

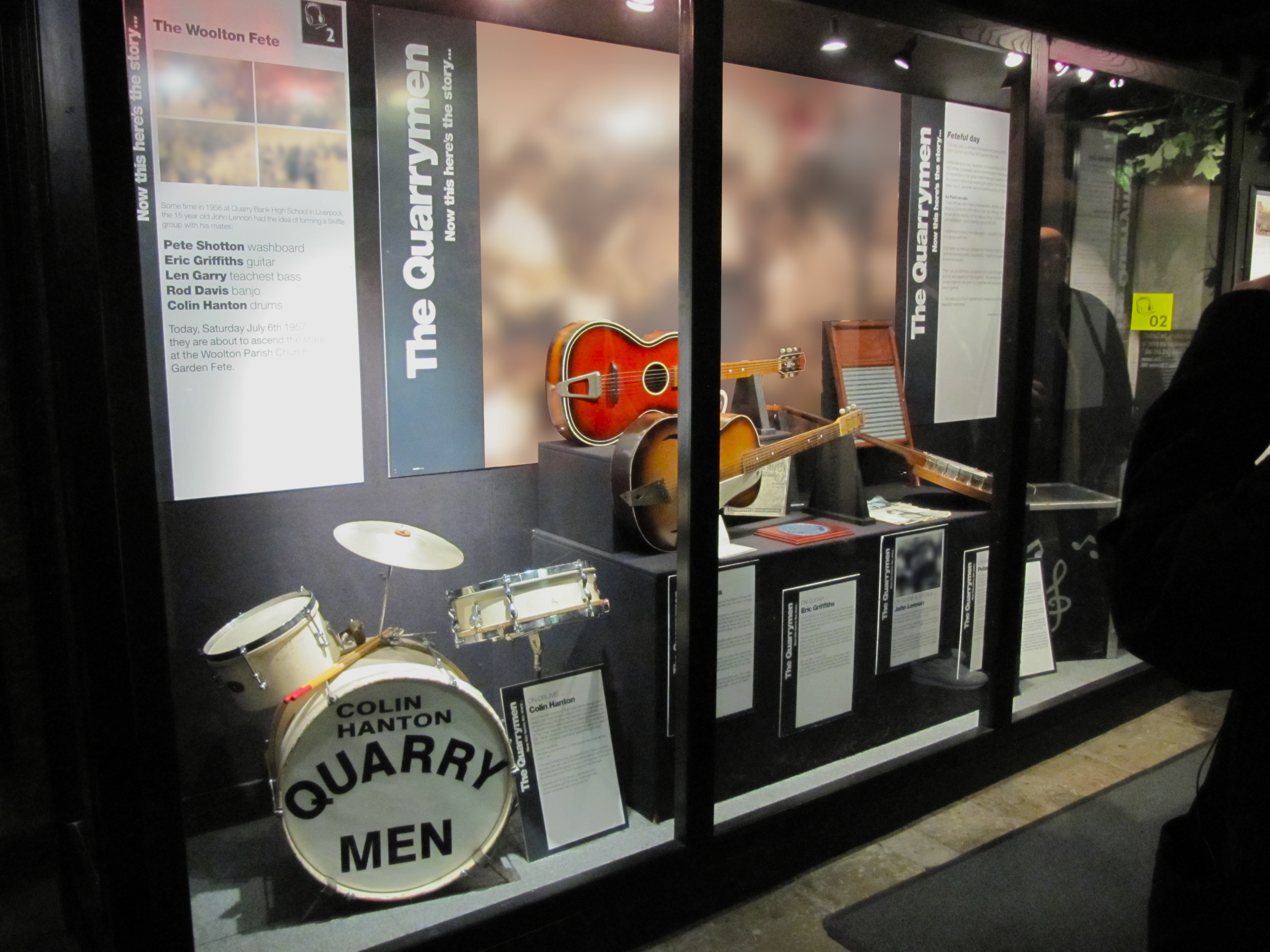
The Quarrymen's instruments

The group first rehearsed in Shotton's house on Vale Road, but because of the noise, his mother told them to use the corrugated air-raid shelter in the back garden. Rehearsals were moved from the cold air-raid shelter to Hanton's or Griffiths' house — as Griffiths' father had died in WWII, and his mother worked all day. The band also often visited Lennon's mother at 1 Blomfield Road, listening to her collection of rock and roll records by Elvis, Shirley and Lee's "Let the Good Times Roll", and Gene Vincent's "Be-Bop-A-Lula" which they added to their repertoire. After his tenure on tea-chest bass, Walley became the group's manager. He sent flyers to local theatres and ballrooms, and put up posters designed by Lennon: "Country-and-western, rock n' roll, skiffle band — The Quarrymen — Open for Engagements — Please Call Nigel Walley, Tel. Gateacre 1715".

Walley managed to secure the group several paid engagements throughout the spring of 1957, including one at The Cavern Club. A jazz club at the time, the Cavern tolerated skiffle as it was considered an offshoot of jazz. Lennon, however, began leading the band in several rock and roll numbers, prompting the club's manager to send up a note ordering the group to "cut out the bloody rock".

In July 1957, Canadian impresario Carroll Levis held a talent contest in Liverpool, the winners of which would appear on the television series Star Search. The Quarrymen played Lonnie Donegan's "Worried Man Blues", and were loudly applauded, but a group from Wales (called the Sunnyside Skiffle Group) "jumped all over the stage" and outshone the static Quarrymen, and were asked by Levis to fill in the last few minutes of the contest with a second song. Lennon argued heatedly with Levis backstage, saying the Sunnyside Skiffle Group had brought a bus full of supporters with them, and were given "the upper hand" advantage by Levis. After the competition, Levis used a clap-o-meter (a machine to measure the decibels of the audience's reaction to the groups) as they were asked to walk back out onto the stage. The Quarrymen and the Sunnyside Skiffle Group tied by both reaching ninety on the meter, but after a second test, the Quarrymen lost by a small margin.

=== Paul McCartney joins the group ===
The photograph of the Quarrymen playing at St. Peter's Church garden fête, where Lennon and McCartney first met. From left to right: Griffiths, Hanton, Davis, Lennon, Shotton, Garry

On 6 July 1957, The Quarrymen played at the St. Peter's Church Rose Queen garden fête in Woolton. They first played on the back of a moving flatbed lorry, in a procession of floats that carried the Rose Queen and retiring Rose Queen, Morris dancers, Boy Scouts, Brownies, Girl Guides and Cubs, led by the Band of the Cheshire Yeomanry. At 4:15, they played on a permanent stage in the field behind the church, before a display by the City of Liverpool Police Dogs. They were playing "Come Go with Me" when Paul McCartney arrived, and in the Scout hut after the set, Ivan Vaughan introduced McCartney to Lennon, who chatted for a few minutes before the band set up in the church hall for their performance at that evening's "Grand Dance". McCartney demonstrated how he tuned his guitar and then sang Eddie Cochran's "Twenty Flight Rock", Gene Vincent's "Be-Bop-a-Lula", and a medley of Little Richard songs.

Vaughan and McCartney left before the evening show which started at 8 o'clock. During the performance, there was an unexpected thunderstorm, which made the lights go out. Bob Molyneux, a young schoolmate from Quarry Bank, recorded part of the performance on his Grundig TK8 portable reel-to-reel tape recorder. The tape included versions of Lonnie Donegan's "Puttin' On the Style" and Elvis' "Baby Let's Play House". In 1963, Molyneux offered the tape to Lennon via Ringo Starr, but Lennon never responded, so Molyneux put the tape in a vault.

As they were walking home after the evening performance, Lennon and Shotton discussed the afternoon encounter with McCartney, and Lennon said that perhaps they should invite McCartney to join the band. Two weeks later, Shotton encountered McCartney cycling through Woolton, and conveyed Lennon's casual invitation for him to join the Quarrymen, and Vaughan also invited McCartney to join. McCartney said he would join after Scout camp in Hathersage, Derbyshire, and a holiday with his family at the Butlin's holiday camp in Filey, North Yorkshire. Shotton and Davis both left the Quarrymen in August, feeling that the group was moving away from skiffle and towards rock, leaving their instruments superfluous. When McCartney returned from holiday, he began rehearsing with the Quarrymen, playing songs such as "Bye Bye Love" (The Everly Brothers) and "All Shook Up", which Lennon and the group had been trying to learn, without success.

McCartney made his debut with the band on 18 October 1957 at a Conservative Club social held at the New Clubmoor Hall in the Norris Green section of Liverpool. Lennon and McCartney wore cream-coloured sports jackets, which were paid for by the whole group—Walley collected half a crown per week from each member until they were paid for — and the others wore white shirts with tassels and black bootlace ties. To the irritation of the other group members, McCartney endlessly practised the lead guitar intro to "Raunchy". The Quarrymen continued to play sparse gigs throughout the autumn of 1957, mostly for local promoter Charlie McBain. During this period, the group almost entirely excised skiffle from their repertoire, focusing on covers of songs by rock and roll singers such as Elvis Presley, Carl Perkins, Little Richard, and Larry Williams, and the Quarrymen's sound increasingly relied on harmony singing between Lennon and McCartney. An extremely important influence for them at the time was Buddy Holly and his group the Crickets. Around this time, Lennon and McCartney both started writing songs influenced by Holly – Lennon's "Hello Little Girl" and McCartney's "I Lost My Little Girl" – and both were impressed with each other's efforts. The two young men began writing together.

=== George Harrison's entry and recording ===
After McCartney's poor performance on lead guitar at the Conservative Club, the group needed another guitarist to accommodate their new rock-focused repertoire; McCartney recommended his school friend George Harrison. Harrison first saw the group perform on 6 February 1958 at Wilson Hall, where McCartney introduced him to Lennon. Harrison subsequently auditioned for The Quarrymen in March at Rory Storm's Morgue Skiffle Club, playing "Guitar Boogie Shuffle". Lennon thought Harrison (having just turned 15) was too young to join the band, so McCartney engineered another meeting on the upper deck of a Liverpool bus, where Harrison played "Raunchy" for Lennon. After McCartney's constant advocacy, Lennon allowed Harrison to join the Quarrymen as lead guitarist. Harrison's entry into the Quarrymen shifted the group even more away from skiffle, in addition to ending Lennon's use of banjo chords. Around this time, John Duff Lowe, another school friend of McCartney, joined the group on piano.

With Harrison's entry, the Quarrymen now had four guitarists. Lennon and McCartney suggested to Griffiths that he instead buy a bass guitar, but Griffiths refused because of the expense. The two subsequently convinced Nigel Walley, still acting as the group's manager, to fire Griffiths. Walley regretted the incident, and as a result gradually severed his ties with the Quarrymen. Around this same time, Len Garry contracted tubercular meningitis, and spent seven months in the hospital, never playing with the group again. This left Colin Hanton as the last of the group of Lennon's Quarry Bank classmates that originally comprised the group. In March, McCartney bought an Elpico amplifier with two inputs, and he and Harrison added pickups to their guitars, giving the Quarrymen an electric sound for the first time.

"In Spite of All the Danger", the only copy of the shellac acetate containing the only two songs professionally recorded by the Quarrymen

Percy Phillips operated a studio called Phillips' Sound Recording Services at 38 Kensington, Liverpool, between the kitchen and a front room that served as an electrical goods shop. Actors from the Liverpool Playhouse often stayed in the room above the studio, and were asked by Phillips to record monologues and poems. Phillips had just turned 60 years old when Harrison heard about the studio from guitarist Johnny Byrne of the Raving Texans, who had recorded a version of "Butterfly" there on 22 June 1957. The Quarrymen booked a recording session on 12 July 1958. They recorded straight to disc, as tape would have been an extra expense. The sound was recorded live by a single microphone in the centre of the room, and Lennon suggested that Hanton put a scarf over the snare drum to lower the volume. They first recorded "In Spite of All the Danger" a McCartney original (credited as McCartney/Harrison) followed by Buddy Holly's "That'll Be the Day". Both feature Lennon on lead vocals. When the recording was finished, Phillips handed the group a fragile 78rpm record, which was passed around the band for one week each, or lent out to friends. The disc bore the "Kensington" label and instructions to "Play with a lightweight pickup". It was later lost until Lowe rediscovered it in 1981, and sold it to McCartney for an undisclosed amount. The recordings would later be issued on the Beatles' album Anthology 1.

=== "The rhythm's in the guitars" ===
Soon after the recording session, Hanton had a fight with the rest of the group and quit. Lowe too lost contact with the group after leaving Liverpool Institute, leaving the Quarrymen as just a trio of guitarists: Lennon, McCartney, and Harrison. Lennon's mother was killed in a road accident on 15 July 1958, dealing him a devastating emotional blow. The group remained mostly inactive throughout the summer, as Lennon took up a job in a restaurant at the Liverpool Airport. McCartney and Harrison, meanwhile, went on holiday hitchhiking in Wales, playing with a local skiffle group called The Vikings. Although Lennon, McCartney, and Harrison remained extremely close, the trio only performed a handful of times in the last months of 1958. When asked why they had neither a drummer or a bass player, they would respond "The rhythm's in the guitars."

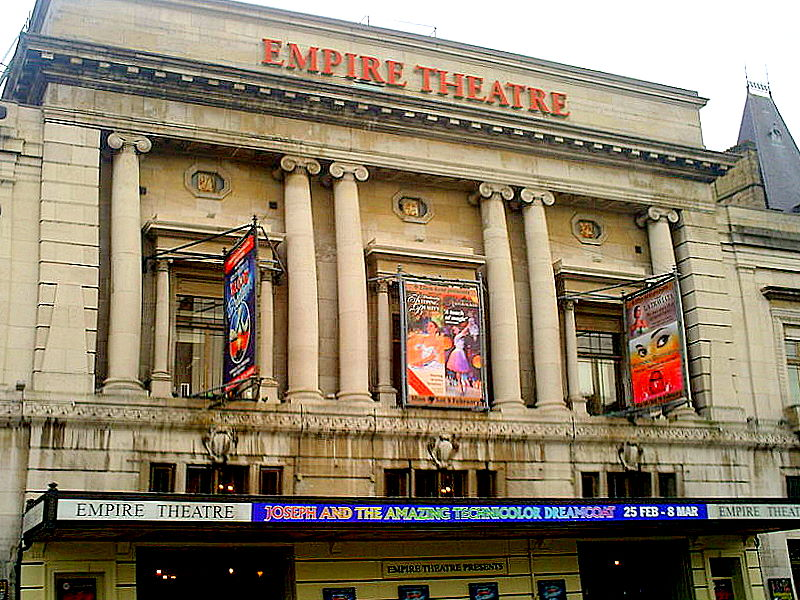
The Liverpool Empire Theatre, where Johnny and the Moondogs auditioned for Carrol Levis

In the fall of 1958, the group had another chance to audition for Carroll Levis, nearly a year and a half after the Quarrymen's first Star Search. For the audition, the group changed their name to Johnny and the Moondogs. Lennon was without a guitar, his having broken recently. Johnny and the Moondogs passed the first heat of the competition in Liverpool, and were invited to appear in the finals in Manchester. The group performed Buddy Holly's "Think It Over" to positive reception, but were unable to stay until the end of the competition to receive the results. As they were leaving, Lennon saw a cutaway electric guitar by the stage door, picked it up and walked off with it, later saying that the trip "wasn't a total loss."

Following their Star Search audition, Johnny and the Moondogs changed their name to Japage 3 (pronounced "Jaypage") (combining letters from each of the member's names: John, Paul, and George). Lennon had a friend from art school, named Derek Hodkin, who owned a tape recorder, and Lennon convinced him to record the group (along with McCartney's brother Mike on drums). The group then asked Hodkin to act as their manager, and he agreed. Despite Hodkin's management, bookings for the group dried up. Harrison began a stint as rhythm guitarist in the Les Stewart Quartet, who had a weekly club engagement. By May, Japage 3 was defunct, although the three continued to see each other socially, and Lennon and McCartney continued to write songs together.

=== The Casbah Club and name change to the Beatles ===
McCartney and Lennon playing on the opening night of The Casbah Coffee Club.

In the summer of 1959, Mona Best decided to open a club in her cellar, and offered the Les Stewart Quartet a residency if they would help convert the cellar. Harrison and fellow Quartet guitarist Ken Brown, however, missed a show, causing Les Stewart to fire the two and drop the residency. This caused distress to Best, but Harrison offered a solution: he recruited Lennon and McCartney to play, and they returned to calling themselves the Quarrymen. After helping Best finish converting the cellar, the new four guitarist line-up of the Quarrymen (Lennon, McCartney, Harrison, and Brown) opened the Casbah Coffee Club on 29 August 1959. The opening night performance was attended by about 300 local teenagers, but as the cellar had no air conditioning and people were dancing, the temperature rose until it became hard to breathe. The Quarrymen were afforded the use of Brown's three input amplifier (which, along with McCartney's Elpico, meant that all four guitarists were electric), and sang through one microphone connected to the club's small PA system.

The group continued their Casbah residency for the next 4 months into the new year 1960, occasionally securing other gigs. In January, Brown grew ill and was unable to play the show. Best, however, insisted that the Quarrymen still pay Brown, but Lennon, McCartney, and Harrison refused; the incident resulted in the loss of their residency at the Casbah and Brown's departure from the group. Shortly after, however, Lennon convinced fellow art school student Stuart Sutcliffe to purchase a bass guitar and join the group. The group had no bookings, but began rehearsing vigorously to allow the musical novice Sutcliffe practice on his new instrument.

In early 1960, the Quarrymen returned to Phillips' Sound Recording Services to record Lennon's new original song "One After 909", although this recording does not survive. Around the same time, the three made a rehearsal tape at McCartney's home. Harrison was absent (as he had an apprenticeship), and the tape features several jams and original songs, including the McCartney instrumental "Cayenne". With few gigs during this period the group often wrote letters to secure bookings, several of which survive. The four disliked the Quarrymen name, and went through several others during this period, including Los Paranoias. By March 1960, Lennon and Sutcliffe came up with a new name: the Beatles. The Beatles (after several line-up changes, including adding Mona's son Pete Best on drums) continued to perform around Liverpool and in Hamburg, Germany, before being signed to Parlophone Records in 1962.

=== First reformation and Open for Engagements: 1992–1995 ===
Since the break-up of the Beatles in 1970 and the murder of John Lennon in 1980, members of the Quarrymen have reunited several times. In 1992, Len Garry, Rod Davis and John Lowe recorded 2 albums' worth of songs under Lowe’s leadership, with Garry serving as lead vocalist. The group recorded a first attempt at Amadeus Studios, but this first attempt remains unreleased. Later in 1992, the group tried again, but Amadeus Studios went bankrupt, and they refused to give the band the recordings. From 1994 to 1995, Rod Davis and John Lowe recorded a third album with studio musicians, as Garry was uninterested in joining the third attempt. The session musicians included John Ozoroff on guitar, Richie Gould on bass, and Charles hart on percussion, with Lowe and Ozoroff writing original compositions for the album. This album, Open for Engagements, was released in 1995 under the Quarrymen name.

=== Second reformation and Get Back-Together: 1997–2000 ===
The surviving members of the 1957 line-up of the Quarrymen reunited in 1997 for the 40th anniversary party for the Cavern Club, where the band had played in the past. The members present for the day were Rod Davis, Pete Shotton, Len Garry, Eric Griffiths, and Colin Hanton. The band was convinced to play an impromptu show together after hearing that a local radio station had shown up at the Club, hearing that the band was going to play together.

This led them to be invited to play a show of the 40th anniversary of their show at the 1957 Woolton village fete, which was the location of the first meeting of Lennon and McCartney. The band initially wasn’t going to perform at the show, but was convinced to go after hearing that it would benefit the St. Peter’s Church Hall. All five surviving members from that day, Pete Shotton, Rod Davis, Len Garry, Eric Griffiths and Colin Hanton, performed to an audience of 3,000 people.

With the newfound interest in the band, Griffiths suggested they made an album together as the Quarrymen, leading to Get Back-Together, the first Quarrymen album made up of mostly Quarrymen members. They debuted the album at the Derby Convention in November, playing a few songs live at the Convention. Following this, the group continued to perform, undertaking tours of the United Kingdom, the United States, Germany, Japan, Russia, Cuba and other countries. The group's repertoire focuses on the skiffle and early rock and roll they played in their original incarnation with the added roots rock historical perspective of illustrating how American roots music inspired the nascent Beatles.

In 2000, producer and the Beatles' historian Martin Lewis produced the group performing the Del-Vikings song "Come Go with Me" (the first song McCartney recalled hearing Lennon sing on the first day they met) for use on the soundtrack of the Michael Lindsay-Hogg film Two of Us, a film about the last day that Lennon and McCartney saw each other in April 1976.

Also in 2000, Pete Shotton would retire from the band due to heart scares, and would pass away in 2017.

=== Songs We Remember and Eric Griffiths' death: 2001–2005 ===
The Quarrymen would continue to play shows across the world in the United Kingdom, Germany, Sweden, Italy, Denmark, and Japan between 2001 and 2005. In 2003, the Japanese band The High Lows would invite the band to play two shows with them in Tokyo and Osaka. These shows gained the band attention from Sony BMG, who asked the band if they would record an album for the Japanese market.

The album was recorded in 2004 at Parr Street Studios in Liverpool, with guest appearances from High Lows bassist Sakito Shirabe and pianist Mike Neary, and released the same year under the name Songs We Remember. The album did not feature any contributions from Pete Shotton, who retired from the band in 2000, and the final album appearance of Eric Griffiths, who would pass away the next year in 2005.

=== US Tours and Star Club TV documentary: 2005–2010 ===
Rod Davis, Len Garry and Colin Hanton continued to perform around the world. John Lowe, the Quarrymen pianist behind Open for Engagements in 1994 from the first reformation, joined the second reformed Quarrymen and occasionally performed with the band after Griffith died, between 2005 and 2018.

In June 2006, the band would have a performance at Hinterglauchau Castle recorded and released as the vinyl EP 50 Years Later from the German Beat Archive, which included Edmund Thielow on washboard and Lothar Becker on bass. In October 2008, the band would go on their first tour of the United States, called "From B.B. King's to Burger King", which lasted for two weeks.

In 2009, Garrlet Danker Medienproduktion and Star Club TV would release the documentary film, The Quarrymen- The Band That Started The Beatles, which coincided with the release of "Never Stop Rockin' 'n' Rollin'", the first single from the band since the 1958 recording of "In Spite of All the Danger". The same year, Rod Davis would release two albums, a studio album titled Under the Influence, and the live album Live at the Dream Cafe, under Scorpion Publications.

In September and October 2010, the band undertook a US tour celebrating the 70th birthday of their founder, Lennon, titled the "Happy Birthday John" tour, culminating in a charity concert for Amnesty International honoring Lennon in New York City on Lennon's birthday, Saturday 9 October 2010.

=== Grey Album, Chas Newby joins, departure of John Lowe: 2011–2019 ===
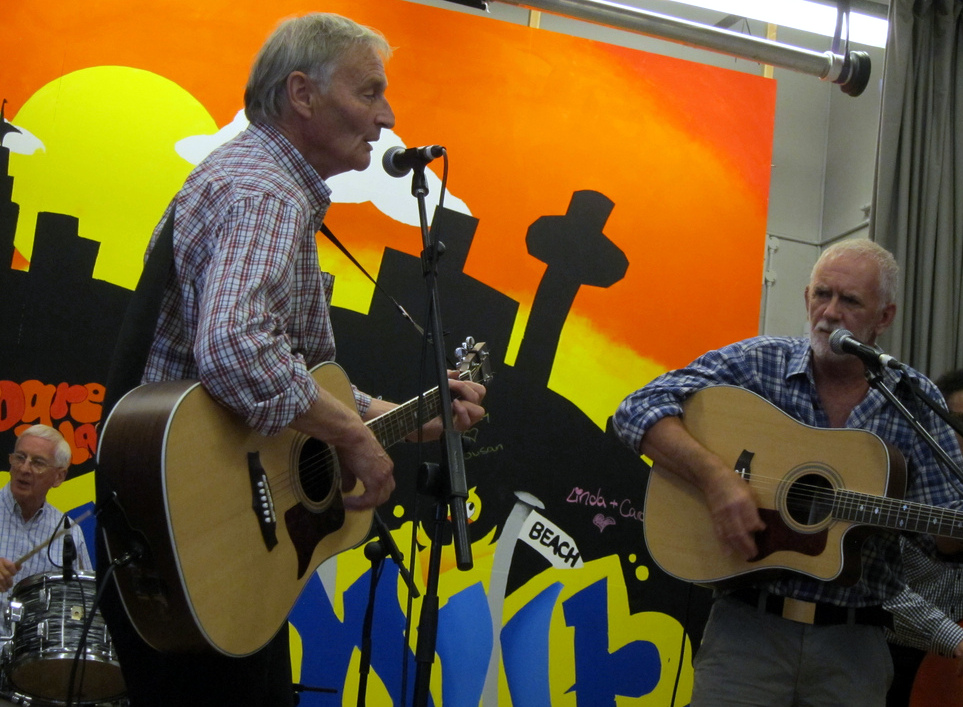
The Quarrymen performing in Liverpool, 2011 (Colin Hanton, Len Garry, Rod Davis)

The Quarrymen would once again work with Garrlet Danker Medienproduktion, who complied the bands fourth studio album, Grey Album in 2012, featuring John Lowe, Rod Davis, Len Garry, and Colin Hanton, alongside collaborations from May Pang and Charles Glenn. The album also included 4 interview tracks from the Garrlet Danker Medienproduktion documentary The Quarrymen- The Band That Started The Beatles, which released three years prior in 2009.

In 2015, the band would once again have a performance recorded by the German Beat Archive, a 3-track EP released by the archive for the 35th anniversary of John Lennon's death in December of 1980. The band provided the protest song "Down by the Riverside" for the EP.

In 2016, Chas Newby, who played with the Beatles in 1960, would join the band, and play with them up until 2022. Pete Shotton, the washboard player for the original Quarrymen and the tea chest bassist for the reformed lineup between 1997 and 2000, would pass away in 2017. John Lowe would retire from the band in 2018, and pass away in 2024.

In 2018, in collaboration with Colin Hall, Colin Hanton would write the autobiography Pre Fab, with a release party held at the Penny Lane Development Centre. The next year, the band would play at the Development Centre with former tea chest bassist Bill Smith, who played with the Quarrymen in 1956.

=== The Quarrymen Live! At Penny Lane, deaths of Newby, Lowe, and Garry: 2020–present ===
In 2020, the band would record their first live album, The Quarrymen Live! At Penny Lane. The album was recorded with an audience of family and friends at the Penny Lane Development Centre, where the band had performed in 2019, and where Colin Hanton and Colin Hall debuted the autobiography Pre Fab in 2018. The album featured the only official performance with Chas Newby with the Quarrymen, as he joined in 2016.

In 2022, once again partnering with the German Beat Archive, Rod Davis and Chas Newby, alongside Edmund Thielow and Karsten Becker, would release a live recording of "Lost John" recorded at the Glauchau Municipal Theater in 2020. The same year, a documentary film called Pre Fab, based on Colin Hanton's book of the same name, would premiere at the Florida Film Festival.

Chas Newby would play his final show with the band in 2022, and pass away in 2023. John Lowe, the band's pianist from 2005 to 2018, and the main Quarrymen member behind the 1992 reformation, would pass away in 2024, six years after leaving the band in 2018.

In 2024, Beatles author David Bedford joined the band on bass after guest performing with the band since 2022, and Henry Lowe, son of John Lowe, joined on keyboards after guest performing since 2023.The band also includes Chrisse Usenius as a guest guitarist, who has occasionally performed with the band since 2016.

Rod Davis would once again release a single with Edmund Thielow for the German Beat Archive, featuring the two performing "Midnight Special" in 2009, and releasing in 2025. In 2022, Len Garry performed his last show with the band, and would pass away in 2026.

== Members ==
=== Current members ===
The current members:

- Colin Hanton – drums (1956–1958, 1997–present)
- Rod Davis – banjo (1957); guitar, vocals (1992, 1994–1995, 1997–present)
- David Bedford – bass guitar (2024–present) [Guest: 2022-2023]
- Henry Duff Lowe – keyboards (2024–present) [Guest: 2023]

=== Former members ===
The former members:

- John Lennon – vocals, guitar (1956–1960; died 1980)
- Eric Griffiths – guitar (1956–1958, 1997–2005; his death)
- Pete Shotton – washboard (1956–1957, 1997–2000; died 2017); tea-chest bass (1997–2000)
- Bill Smith – tea-chest bass (1956) [Guest 2002, 2015 & 2019]
- Nigel Walley – tea-chest bass (1956; Subsequently, became "manager" 1956–1958) [Guest on Washboard 2015 & 2017]
- Ivan Vaughan — tea-chest bass (1956)
- Len Garry – tea-chest bass (1956–1958); vocals, guitar (1992, 1997–2026; his death)
- Paul McCartney – vocals, guitar (1957–1960)
- George Harrison – lead guitar, vocals (1958–1960; died 2001)
- John Duff Lowe – piano, keyboards (1958, 1992, 1994–1995; [Guest: 1997], (as regular guest member) 2005–2017; died 2024); vocals (1994–1995)
- Ken Brown – guitar (1959; died 2010)
- Stuart Sutcliffe – bass guitar (1960; died 1962) [played with Beatles 1960-61]
- Chas Newby – bass guitar (2016–2023; his death. Newby also played bass with the Beatles briefly in 1960)

Open For Engagements 1994 Additional Musicians:

- Richie Gould – bass
- John Ozoroff – guitar, Vocals
- Charles Hart – percussion, Vocals

Guest Members:

(Since 1997, The Quarrymen have had Many Guest Players, usually on the Bass or the Washboard, this is an Incomplete list) [all info sourced from The Quarrymen website]

- Gary Gibson (1997)
- Lawrence Gilmour (1997)
- Pete Seeger (1998)
- Chas McDevitt (2002 & 2017)
- Ulf Krueger (2002)
- Ulli Salm (2002 & 2010) — Bass
- Dave Rowinski (2002)
- Lars Mellquist (2002)
- Christoph Eckel (2003)
- Joe Willenpart (2003)
- Sakito [unknown] (2003)
- Dave Ravenscroft (2004)
- Frank Cairns (Occasionally 2005-2012) — Bass
- Carlos Chardi (2006)
- Steve Howard (2007)
- Huw Williams (2008)
- Owen Clayton (Occasionally 2008-2015) — Bass
- Mike Wilsh (of The Four Pennies) (2009, 2012, 2019 & 2023) — Bass
- Nancy Lowe (John Duff’s Daughter) (2010) — Washboard
- Gavin Fox (2011) — Bass
- Caspar Cronk (2012)
- Neil Kadirov (2013) — Bass
- Den Kagorlitskiy (2013) — Bass
- Andrey Makarevich (2013) — Washboard
- Antonio [unknown] (2014-2015) — Bass (on Spanish Gigs)
- Marco Fedeigolli (2014) — Bass
- Fabrizio Poggi (2014) — Harmonica
- Rolando Giambelli (2014 & 2017) — Harmonica, Washboard
- Chrissis Usenius (occasionally 2014 - present) — Bass, Guitar
- Nikoli Goni (2015) — Drums
- Patril Kollar (2015) — Bass
- Pete Douglas (2015)
- Mark Hudson (2015)
- Maudie Lowe (John Duff’s Daughter) (2015) — Washboard
- Carol (née Walley) (Nigel’s Sister) (2015)
- Jane Eneko (2015 & 2017)
- Bob Francis (2017) — Washboard
- Andrea [unknown] (2017) — Washboard
- Mark Curran (2018) — Washboard
- Mike Byrne (2018 & 2025) — Piano, Keyboards
- Paco [unknown] (2019) — lead guitar (fill in for Len who was unwell)
- Jimmy [unknown] (2019) — Drums (fill in for Colin who was unwell)
- Edmund Thielow — Occasionally
- Steve Rotherham — Washboard & Tea-Chest Bass (2019)
- Karsten Becker (2020) — Drums
- Alex Wenn (2024) — Drums (Cover for Colin, who had COVID)
- Wolfgang Bernreuther (2025) — Guitar
- Julian Gramano (2025) — Drums (Colin had Flu)
- (Guest Audience Members have also played Washboard on a few occasions)

== Original band discography ==
=== Recordings ===
- "That'll Be the Day" and "In Spite of All the Danger" (both recorded in 1958) are available on the Beatles album Anthology 1 (1995).
- A number of home rehearsals featuring Lennon, McCartney, Harrison, and Sutcliffe were recorded in early 1960. Three of these were released on Anthology 1, while others have appeared on various bootlegs.
- An unreleased recording of "Maggie May" was featured in the 2018 film Looking for Lennon.

== Reformed band discography ==
Since the Quarrymen reformed in 1992 and 1997, they’ve released multiple albums and other recordings under the Quarrymen name.

=== Studio albums ===
- Open for Engagements (1994)
- Get Back – Together (1997)
- Songs We Remember (2004)
- Grey Album (2012)

=== Live albums ===
- The Quarrymen Live! In Penny Lane (2020)

=== DVD ===
The Quarrymen have also had a DVD documentary made about them by Garrlet Danker Medienproduktion.

- The Band That Started the Beatles (2009)

=== German Beat Archive recordings ===
Since 2006, the Quarrymen have released recordings in collaboration with the German Beat Archive, made exclusively for supporters of the archive.

- On 28 August 2006, the 10-inch vinyl EP (33 rpm) "50 Years Later" was released, featuring the song "Down by the Riverside" with the Quarrymen Rod Davis, Len Garry, Colin Hanton, and John Duff Lowe. The recording was made on 3 June 2006, at Hinterglauchau Castle.
- On 8 December 2015, a 3-track, one-sided color vinyl EP was released, featuring, among other artists, the song "Down by the Riverside" recorded by the Quarrymen Rod Davis, Len Garry, Colin Hanton, and John Duff Lowe. Recorded at St. Peter's Church Hall in Liverpool.
- On 1 January 2022, the single "Lost John" with the Quarrymen Rod Davis and Chas Newby was released. The recording was made on 3 October 2020, at the Glauchau Municipal Theater.
- The single "Midnight Special" featuring Quarryman Rod Davis was released on 1 June 2025. Recorded on 6 February 2009, in Berlin.

=== Other Recordings ===
- A 2000 recording of "Come Go with Me" was featured in the film Two of Us.

== See also ==
- Outline of the Beatles
- The Beatles timeline
