= Dovedale Primary School =

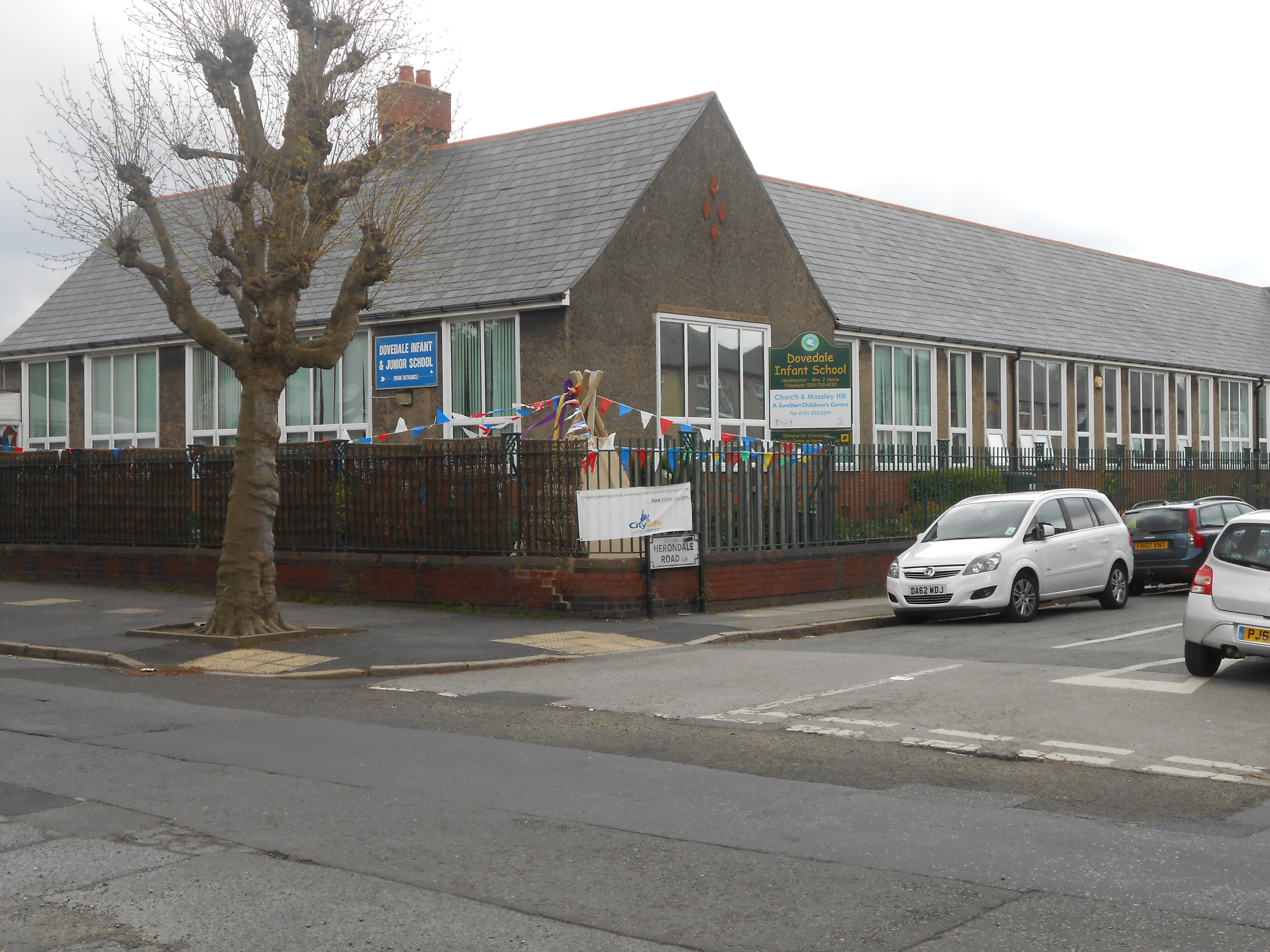
- Dovedale Infant School in 2013

Location
- Herondale Road; Liverpool, Merseyside, L18 1JX; England; 53.3860°N 2.9159°W

Information
- Type: Community school
- Established: 1908; 118 years ago
- Local authority: Liverpool City Council
- Department for Education URN: 141960 Tables
- Ofsted: Reports
- Head Teacher: Nik Smith
- Age: 4 to 11
- Website: dovedaleprimary.co.uk

Dovedale Primary School is a primary school situated on Herondale Road in the Mossley Hill district of Liverpool, England. It is a mixed community school founded in 1908.

The school was previously known as two separate schools, Dovedale Junior School and Dovedale Infant School, but has since merged. It is Dovedale Primary which is probably best known as the school which George Harrison and John Lennon of The Beatles, and Lennon's lifelong friend Pete Shotton attended. Some others who attended the school were comedian Jimmy Tarbuck and the newsreader Peter Sissons. In the 1950s, it had a very good reputation as a 'feeder' school for Liverpool grammar schools such as Quarry Bank High School, the Liverpool Institute for Boys, and the Liverpool Blue Coat School.

In 2001, John Lennon's widow, Yoko Ono, donated £25,000 for school refurbishments.

In September 2015, the two schools formally merged management, and are now recognised as a single school by the Department for Education, known as Dovedale Primary School.
