= Ivan Vaughan =

Friend of John Lennon (1942–1993)

- Born: 18 June 1942; Liverpool, England
- Died: 16 August 1993 (aged 51) Liverpool, England
- Genres: Skiffle
- Occupations: Musician; teacher
- Instrument: Tea-chest bass
- Formerly of: The Quarrymen
- Spouse: Jan Vaughan (m. 1966)

Ivan Vaughan (18 June 1942 – 16 August 1993) was an English musician and teacher best known for introducing two of his childhood friends to each other, John Lennon and Paul McCartney, in 1957.

== Biography ==
Vaughan was born in Liverpool on the same day as McCartney and they both commenced school at the Liverpool Institute in September 1953. Vaughan studied classics at University College London, married in 1966 and settled down to family life with a son and daughter. From 1973 to 1983, Vaughan taught psychology at Homerton College, Cambridge. On grounds of ill health, he had to take early retirement.

Vaughan died in Liverpool on 16 August 1993 of pneumonia, at the age of 51. He is commemorated by a memorial bench in Cambridge University Botanic Gardens.

=== Lennon and McCartney ===
At age 4, Vaughan became friends with a 6-year-old John Lennon. Lennon led a crew of friends with Vaughan, Nigel Walley, and Pete Shotton, who hung out around Liverpool at places like Strawberry Field. Vaughan met McCartney upon their entry to the Liverpool Institute High School for Boys in 1953. (Vaughan attended Liverpool Institute because his mother sought to separate him from Lennon, who was attending Quarry Bank High School.)

He played tea-chest bass part-time in Lennon's first band, the Quarrymen. He was responsible for introducing 16-year-old Lennon to McCartney at a community event, the Woolton village fête, on 6 July 1957, where the Quarrymen were performing. McCartney, having just turned 15, impressed Lennon by knowing all the lyrics to Eddie Cochran's song "Twenty Flight Rock", and with his guitar playing, Lennon invited McCartney to join the band. The next day, McCartney conveyed through Vaughan that he accepted the offer. This decision led to the formation of the Lennon–McCartney partnership, which formed the nucleus of the Beatles.

Lennon and McCartney kept in contact with Vaughan during the 1960s. Vaughan's wife Jan, a language teacher, helped McCartney with the French lyrics to the Beatles' 1965 song "Michelle". For a time, the Beatles put Vaughan on the payroll of their Apple company, in charge of a plan that never took off to set up a school.

Vaughan's death touched McCartney so deeply that he began to write poetry for the first time since he was a child. He wrote the poem "Ivan" about him after his death, which was published in McCartney's 2001 book Blackbird Singing.

== Autobiographic and documentary ==
In 1977, Vaughan was diagnosed with Parkinson's disease. His book, Ivan: Living with Parkinson’s Disease, was published in 1986. He was featured in a 1984 BBC documentary, produced by Patrick Uden and hosted by Jonathan Miller, about his search for a cure.
