= Colin Hanton =

British musician (born 1938)

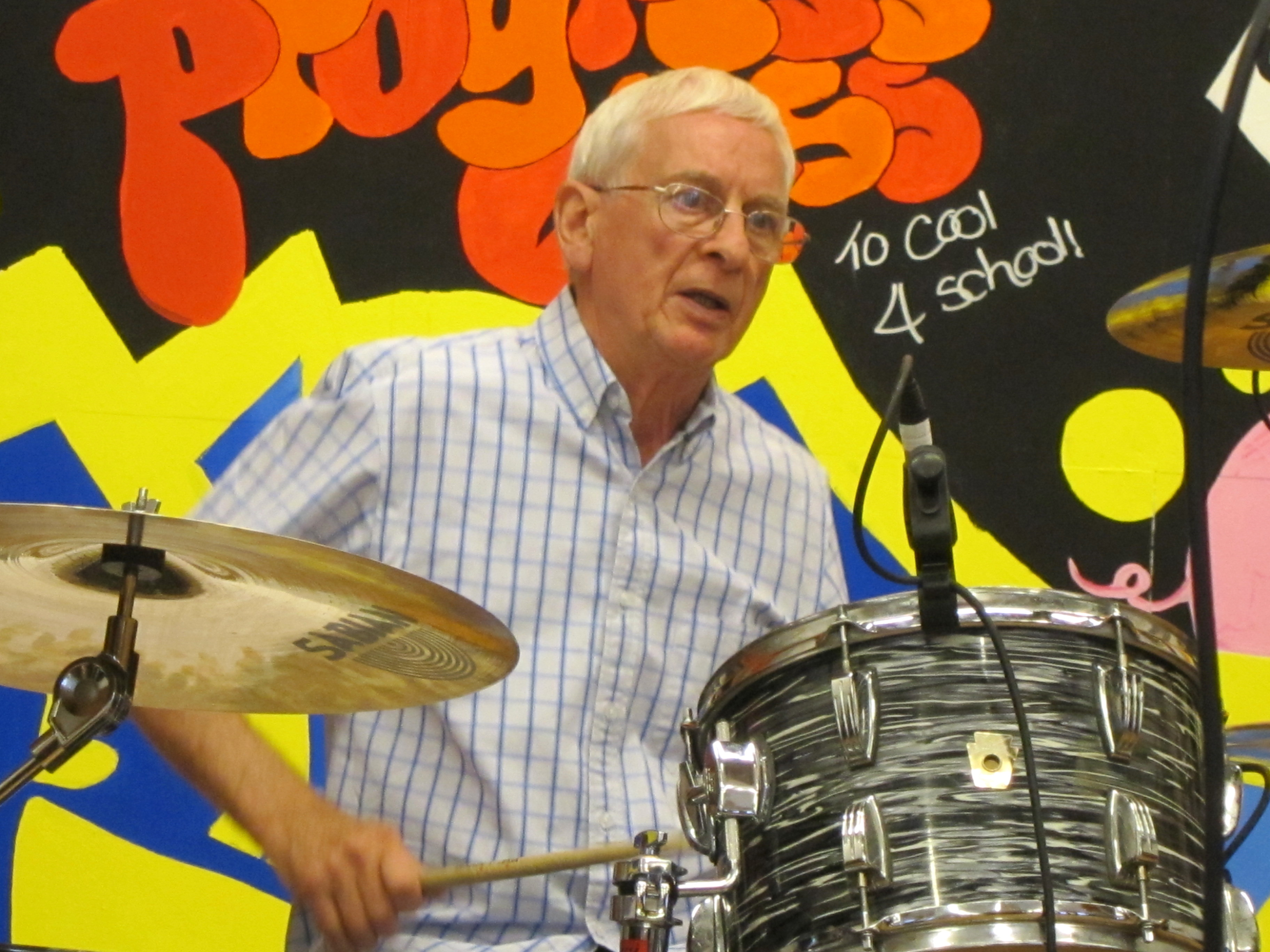
- Hanton in 2011

Background information
- Born: Colin Leo Hanton; 12 December 1938 (age 87); Bootle, Lancashire, England
- Genres: Rock and roll; skiffle
- Instrument: Drums
- Years active: 1956–1959, 1997–present
- Member of: The Quarrymen

Colin Leo Hanton (born 12 December 1938) is an English musician, best known as the drummer for the 1950s skiffle band The Quarrymen, led by a young John Lennon. He currently plays for the reformed version of The Quarrymen.

== Early life ==
Hanton was born in Bootle and moved to Woolton, Liverpool when he was eight in 1946. Hanton's mother (Ethel Jones b.1913) died of tuberculosis in 1950, when Colin was a child, and he and his siblings moved into their grandparents' house. Colin left school and worked trained as a carpenter, before moving to working as an upholsterer in Speke.

== The Quarrymen ==
=== 1956–1959 ===
In the summer of 1956, Hanton helped form the Quarrymen along with John Lennon, Eric Griffiths, Pete Shotton and Rod Davis. He was asked to join the nascent band, largely because he had recently purchased a new drum kit. Hanton played drums on the Quarrymen's first recordings, a cover of The Crickets' "That'll Be the Day" and an original song by Paul McCartney and George Harrison, "In Spite of All the Danger", in 1958.

Hanton left the Quarrymen after an argument with the rest of the band following a disastrous performance at the Speke Bus Depot Social Club in Wavertree on 1 January 1959. The band had gone through several line-up changes until January 1959 (by then, the group's members were Lennon, Hanton, Paul McCartney, George Harrison and John "Duff" Lowe):

We had drunk a few beers during the interval and an argument started on the way home on the bus. I got off to catch another bus to take me home to Woolton and somehow or other that was that, they never contacted me again to ask me to play. I saw John a few times and he told me that they had got a drummer called Pete, which must have been Pete Best. After that I lost touch completely.

=== 1994–present ===
In 1997, Hanton reunited with the then-surviving members of The Quarrymen to perform a concert, to commemorate 40 years since the group's formation. Shortly after, they embarked on a tour which took place in the United Kingdom, United States, Germany, and Japan, among many others. Hanton has participated on all Quarrymen releases since; including their three albums; Get Back – Together (1997), Songs We Remember (2004), and Grey Album (2012). Their recent material primarily consists of rock and roll and skiffle songs from the 1950s.

Hanton was portrayed by actor Sam Wilmott in the 2009 biopic Nowhere Boy.

The Quarrymen performed in New York City, for what would have been Lennon's 70th birthday, in 2010.

As of 2025, Hanton still tours with Rod Davis.

== Later life ==
Hanton married his wife, Joan, in 1965. Together, they had two children. Hanton continued to work for the Guy Rogers carpentry company until it shut down in 1979. Afterwards, he opened his own upholstery business, which he still runs today. Colin still lives in Liverpool.

== Discography ==
=== With the Quarrymen ===
==== Studio albums ====
| Title | Year |
|---|---|
| Get Back – Together | 1997 |
| Songs We Remember | 2004 |
| Grey Album | 2012 |

==== Live albums ====
| Title | Year |
|---|---|
| Live at the Halfmoon Pub Putney | 2005 |
| The Quarrymen Live! In Penny Lane | 2020 |

==== Singles ====
| Title | Year |
|---|---|
| "That'll Be the Day" | 1958 |
| "In Spite of All the Danger" | 1958 |
