= Rod Davis (musician) =

Musical artist (born 1941)

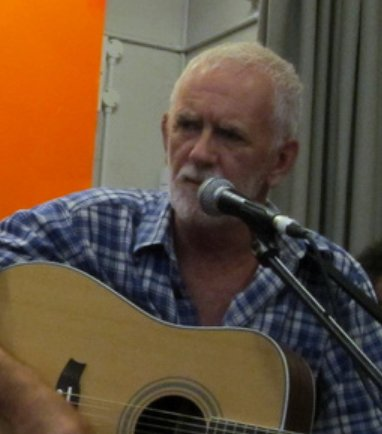
- Davis performing with The Quarrymen in 2011

Background information
- Born: 7 November 1941 (age 84); Sefton, Liverpool, England, U.K.
- Genres: Skiffle; rock; bluegrass; folk
- Occupations: Musician, lecturer
- Instruments: Banjo; guitar; vocals
- Years active: 1957–1960s; 1994-present
- Member of: The Quarrymen
- Spouse: William Davies (2009-2019) Pippa wood (2019-2021)

Rodney Verso Davis (born 7 November 1941) is an English musician, best known for being a member of The Quarrymen, a band who would later evolve into The Beatles.

== The Quarrymen ==
=== 1957–1961 ===
Davis was born in Smithdown Hospital, Sefton, Liverpool. Davis played in a jazz trio whilst at school with Gerald Greenwood (piano) and Les Brough (drums). Rod was attending Quarry Bank High School, when he was asked to join the Quarrymen in 1957, along with Colin Hanton, as their banjo string player:

I lived in Woolton and first met John Lennon, Pete Shotton, Nigel Walley, Ivan Vaughan and Geoff Rhind at St. Peter's Sunday School when we were very small boys. I lived near Colin Hanton and we used to play street football together. I met Eric Griffiths when we both started at Quarry Bank School, and Len Garry when he became the Quarrymen's tea-chest bass player. Eric invited me to join the Quarrymen in early 1956 just after I bought a banjo.

The group, consisting of John Lennon, Eric Griffiths, Pete Shotton, Len Garry, Colin Hanton, and Davis, formed the first stable line-up of the group. Davis' tenure with the group was short, and he and Pete Shotton, left in August 1957, feeling that the group was moving away from skiffle and towards rock, leaving their instruments superfluous.

Davis would make a record in 1961 as part of a band called the Trad Grads, by which time he played mandolin, fiddle, banjo, guitar, concertina, and melodeon. In a 1997 issue of Record Collector, he said that when he told Lennon about this in early 1962, Lennon "said, 'You don't play the drums, do you? We need a drummer to take back to Hamburg.'" Davis, who had gone on to attend Cambridge University, declined Lennon’s offer, allowing the Beatles to recruit Pete Best. The two men lost contact after this.

=== 1994–present ===
In 1997, Davis reunited with surviving members of the Quarrymen to perform a concert, to commemorate 40 years since the group's formation. They embarked on a tour which took place in the United Kingdom, United States, Germany, and Japan, among many others. Davis has participated on all Quarrymen releases since; including their three albums; Get Back – Together (1997), Songs We Remember (2004), and Grey Album (2012). Their recent material primarily consists of rock and roll and skiffle songs from the 1950s.

Davis was portrayed by actor James Jack Bentham in the 2009 biopic Nowhere Boy.

The Quarrymen performed in New York City, for what would have been Lennon's 70th birthday in 2010.

As of 2016, Davis still tours with founding member Colin Hanton.

== Later life ==
In the 1960s, Davis played the mandolin and fiddle in numerous Bluegrass bands. In 1964, he played with the Bluegrass Ramblers. They would later appear on an episode of Opportunity Knocks. Davis taught French and Spanish until 1968, when he took up a job as an expedition driver for a company called Minitrek Expeditions, taking trips to Russia, Turkey and across the Sahara desert.

Davis married in 1970. He and his wife settled in Hertfordshire, where both of their children were born. The couple divorced in 1982.

Davis worked for numerous different jobs in the travelling industry during his life, whilst also playing in a handful of different folk and bluegrass groups. Davis met his current partner, Janet, in the 1980s. Around that time, he started lecturing in Tourism at Uxbridge College. In 1996, he became a part-time lecturer at Brunel University. He retired in 2006.

== Discography ==
=== With the Quarrymen ===
==== Studio albums ====
Title	Year
Get Back – Together	1997
Songs We Remember	2004
Grey Album	2012

==== Live albums ====
Title	Year
Live At The Halfmoon Pub Putney	2005
The Quarrymen Live! In Penny Lane	2020
