= Chas Newby =

British musician (1941–2023)

- Newby in 2020

Background information
- Born: Charles Newby; 18 June 1941; Liverpool, England
- Died: 22 May 2023 (aged 81)
- Genres: Rock
- Occupations: Musician, teacher
- Instrument: Bass guitar
- Years active: 1959–1961; 2016–2023
- Formerly of: The Beatles; The Quarrymen

Charles Newby (18 June 1941 – 22 May 2023) was a British musician who was briefly the bassist for the Beatles for several gigs in December 1960, while Stuart Sutcliffe was still in Hamburg focusing on his art career.

== Career ==
When the Beatles returned from West Germany for the first time, they were in need of a bass guitarist. Pete Best suggested Chas Newby. Newby had been with The Black Jacks (Best's group), and was now attending university; however, he was on holiday, and so he agreed to play with the Beatles.

Newby appeared with the Beatles for four engagements in December 1960 (17 December, Casbah Club, Liverpool; 24 December, Grosvenor Ballroom, Liscard; 27 December, Litherland Town Hall; 31 December, Casbah Club). John Lennon asked him to go to West Germany for the Beatles' second trip, but Newby chose to return to university. After Lennon and George Harrison both declined to switch to bass guitar, Paul McCartney, who previously played guitar and piano, reluctantly became the band's bass player.

== Personal life and death ==
Newby taught mathematics at Droitwich Spa High School in Droitwich Spa and most recently lived in Alcester, where he played in a charity group, the Racketts. In 2016, Newby began performing as a member of the Quarrymen, the band that was the precursor to the Beatles.

Newby died on 22 May 2023, at the age of 81.
