= Eric Griffiths =

English musician (1940–2005)

- Born: Eric Ronald Griffiths; 31 October 1940; Denbigh, Wales, UK
- Died: 29 January 2005 (aged 64); Edinburgh, Scotland, UK
- Occupations: Dry Cleaner; musician
- Spouse: Relda Griffiths
- Musical career
- Genres: Rock, skiffle
- Instruments: Guitar; vocals

Eric Ronald Griffiths (31 October 1940 – 29 January 2005) was a British musician and dry cleaner. He was best known as the rhythm guitarist in the original line-up of the Quarrymen until he left the group in the summer of 1958.

== Early life ==
Born in Denbigh, North Wales, to Liverpudlian parents, Eric's mother returned to Liverpool in 1945 to live with her parents after her husband's death as an RAF pilot in World War II. In 1950, the family moved to Halewood Drive, Woolton, Liverpool and at the age of 11 Griffiths won a scholarship to Quarry Bank High School where he met John Lennon, Pete Shotton and Rod Davis.

== Biography and career ==
=== The Quarrymen ===
The four boys were in the same House at school and shared an interest in American music; particularly skiffle. Lennon and Griffiths attended some guitar lessons, but found it too slow to learn and dropped the lessons when Lennon's mother taught them to play easier banjo chords. The two boys would play truant to practise in the Griffiths home whilst his mother was at work. Griffiths also befriended a novice drummer, Colin Hanton, with whom he would also practice. When Lennon formed the Quarry Men with Shotton and Davis, Griffiths was invited to add his rudimentary skills because he had a new guitar.

Griffiths left school in the summer of 1957 with GCE passes in English, Mathematics and History and became an engineering apprentice whilst continuing to play as rhythm guitarist while Lennon played as lead guitarist in the band. When Paul McCartney joined the Quarrymen he aspired to be lead guitarist, but his ineptitude at his one public attempt stymied that. The other band members decided that neither McCartney nor Lennon were suitable lead guitarists, so when George Harrison joined the band they suggested that Griffiths buy an electric bass and an amplifier, but he could not afford this. Griffiths was not invited to McCartney's house for the next rehearsal and when he coincidentally phoned them during the practice session, drummer Colin Hanton had to let him know he was no longer in the band.

=== Non-musical career ===
Griffiths decided to abandon engineering too and he joined the Merchant Navy as a cadet navigating officer. He continued to meet his old friends from the band when he was on leave but he lost contact with Lennon and McCartney after they first recorded with EMI.

Griffiths left the navy in 1964 and married Relda at Woolton Parish Church. He spent the next thirty years working in the prison service modernising prisoners' working practices. In 1972, he left the English Prison Service to join the Scottish Prison Service and he moved to Edinburgh with his wife and three sons. In 1994, he left the Prison Service to concentrate on running the family business, a chain of dry cleaners.

=== Quarrymen reunion ===
In January 1997, Griffiths returned to Liverpool to meet some of his former band members at the Cavern Club's 40th anniversary. All the surviving original Quarrymen were present and during the evening they gave an impromptu performance with borrowed instruments on the stage. When the band were persuaded to reform for a charity gig in Woolton in July 1997, Griffiths had to buy a guitar and re-learn a few chords.

The reunion was a huge success and generated demand for a CD. Griffiths decided that the reformed band should record an album and John Lennon’s Original Quarrymen—Get back Together was released in September 1997. Griffiths then toured widely with the Quarrymen until his last performance at the SAS Royal Garden Hotel, Trondheim, Norway on 27 November 2004. He had been complaining of back pain and it became so acute that he had a hospital check-up and pancreatic cancer was diagnosed.

== Death ==
He died at his Edinburgh home from pancreatic cancer on 29 January 2005, aged 64.
