= Pete Shotton =

Businessman, friend of John Lennon (1941-2017)

- Shotton in 1984

Background information
- Born: 4 August 1941; Liverpool, England
- Died: 24 March 2017 (aged 75) Knutsford, Cheshire, England
- Genres: Skiffle; rock and roll
- Occupations: Businessman; musician
- Instruments: Vocals; percussion; tea-chest bass
- Years active: 1956–1957; 1997–2000

Peter Shotton (4 August 1941 – 24 March 2017) was an English businessman and musician. He was known for creating the Fatty Arbuckle's chain of restaurants and for his long friendship with John Lennon of The Beatles; he played the washboard in the Beatles' precursor The Quarrymen and remained close to the band, holding various positions related to their business ventures over the years.

== Biography ==
Shotton was born in Liverpool on 4 August 1941, the son of Bessie (née Wilson) and George Shotton. He was a close childhood friend of John Lennon, with whom he attended Dovedale Infants School and Quarry Bank Grammar School. The two had frequent run-ins with faculty, often being caned by the headmaster as punishment, and they came to be known at Quarry Bank as "Shennon and Lotton" or "Lotton and Shennon".

In 1957, Shotton was Lennon's bandmate in the Quarrymen, playing the washboard until Paul McCartney joined. Shotton left the band when he confided that he did not enjoy playing in the band, prompting Lennon to smash the washboard over his head at a party. However, he remained a friend and confidant of the group, becoming close with the members of the Beatles.

Shotton later pursued a career in business; after the Beatles achieved global superstardom, Lennon bought a supermarket on Hayling Island and gifted it to Shotton. Shotton later served as manager of the band's Apple Boutique, then as the first CEO of Apple Corps. After Lennon began a relationship with Yoko Ono and Apple started to flounder, Shotton parted ways with the Beatles.

Shotton resumed his ownership of the Hayling Island supermarket, which he continued to run until the late 1970s. He later created the Fatty Arbuckle's chain of restaurants with Bill Turner. The franchise was modelled after American style restaurants, and was highly successful in the 1980s. Shotton's majority share was later sold for £5 million. He later moved to Dublin to live as a tax exile. Upon hearing the news that Lennon had been murdered on 8 December 1980, he visited George Harrison at Friar Park. He co-authored, with Nicholas Schaffner, the book John Lennon: In My Life (1983). It was republished later as The Beatles, Lennon and Me, and told the story of their friendship from the age of six until Lennon's death.

On 24 March 2017, at the age of 75, Shotton died of a heart attack at his home in Knutsford.
