= Julia Dykins =

Julia Dykins may refer to:

- Julia Lennon, lived as the wife of John Dykins; mother of John Lennon
- Julia Baird (teacher), née Julia Dykins, teacher
