= Julia (Beatles song) =

1968 song by the Beatles

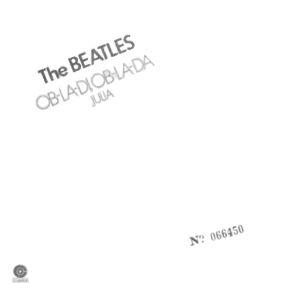
- Picture sleeve for the song's 1976 US single release

Single by the Beatles

from the album The Beatles
- A-side: "Ob-La-Di, Ob-La-Da"
- Released: 22 November 1968
- Recorded: 13 October 1968
- Studio: EMI, London
- Genre: Folk
- Length: 2:54
- Label: Apple
- Songwriter: Lennon–McCartney
- Producer: George Martin

"Julia" is a song by the English rock band the Beatles from their 1968 double album The Beatles (also known as "the White Album"). It is performed as a solo piece by John Lennon. The song was written by Lennon (though credited to Lennon–McCartney) about his mother Julia Lennon, who died in 1958 at age 44.

The track is the final song on side two (disc one on CD) of The Beatles and was the last song recorded for the album. In 1976, it was issued as the B-side of the Beatles single "Ob-La-Di, Ob-La-Da".

== Composition ==
"Julia" was written by John Lennon (credited to Lennon–McCartney) in the key of D major and features Lennon on vocals and acoustic guitar. It was written during the Beatles' 1968 visit to Rishikesh in northern India, where they were studying under the Maharishi Mahesh Yogi. It was here that Lennon learned the song's finger-picking guitar style (known as 'Travis-picking') from the Scottish musician Donovan. Donovan later explained:

He [Lennon] told me he wanted to write a song about his mother. He said, "Donovan, you're the king of children's songs. Can you help me? ... I want to write a song about the childhood that I never really had with my mother." He asked me to help him with the images that he could use in lyrics for a song about this subject. So I said, "Well, when you think of the song, where do you imagine yourself?" And John said, "I'm at a beach and I'm holding hands with my mother and we're walking together." And I helped him with a couple of lines, "Seashell eyes / windy smile" – for the Lewis Carroll, Alice in Wonderland feel that John loved so much.

No other Beatle sings or plays on the song. While Paul McCartney made several "solo" recordings attributed to the group, dating back to his famous song "Yesterday", this is the only time that Lennon played and sang unaccompanied on a Beatles track. The ballad itself was the final track to be composed during recording sessions for The Beatles.

== Lyrics ==
"Julia" was written for John's mother, Julia Lennon (1914–1958), who was killed by a car driven by an off-duty probationary police officer when John was 17 years old. Julia Lennon had encouraged her son's interest in music and bought him his first guitar. But after she split with John's father, John was taken in by his aunt, Mimi, and Julia started a new family with another man; though she lived just a few miles from John, Julia did not spend much time with him for a number of years. Their relationship began to improve as he neared adolescence, though, and in the words of his half-sister, Julia Baird:

As he grew older, John would stay with us more often. He and Daddy got along well enough, and in the evenings when our daddy, a head waiter, was at work, John and Mummy would sit together and listen to records. She was an avid Elvis Presley fan, and she and John would jive around the room to 'Heartbreak Hotel' and other early Elvis recordings. John inherited his love of music from her, and she encouraged him to start with piano and banjo, making him play a tune again and again until he got it right.

"I lost her twice," Lennon said. "Once as a five-year-old when I was moved in with my auntie. And once again when she actually physically died."

The song was also written for his future wife Yoko Ono, whose first name, which literally means "child of the sea" in Japanese, is echoed in the lyric "Oceanchild calls me." Towards the end of his life, he often called Yoko "Mother."

The line "Half of what I say is meaningless, but I say it just to reach you" was a slight variation of Kahlil Gibran's "Sand and Foam" (1926) in which the original verse reads, "Half of what I say is meaningless, but I say it so that the other half may reach you". Lennon also adapted the lines "When I cannot sing my heart, I can only speak my mind" from Gibran's "When life does not find a singer to sing her heart she produces a philosopher to speak her mind".

== Releases and legacy ==
"Julia" was originally released as the final song on side two of The Beatles on 22 November 1968. In 1976, it was released as the B-side of the "Ob-La-Di, Ob-La-Da" single. In 1988, "Julia" was one of the nine Beatles songs on the soundtrack album Imagine: John Lennon. In 2006, a portion was used for the Love album, mixed with "Eleanor Rigby".

Coinciding with the 50th anniversary of its release, Jacob Stolworthy of The Independent listed "Julia" at number 13 in his ranking of the White Album's 30 tracks. He commented: "The first disc ends on a sanguine note with Lennon's ode to his deceased mother, Julia. It remains the only Beatles song he wrote and performed by himself."

== Other recordings ==
The same year the song was released, jazz pianist Ramsey Lewis included it on his Mother Nature's Son album. This version went to #76 on the US Hot 100 and #37 on the Best Selling Soul Singles chart.

== Personnel ==
Personnel per Ian MacDonald:

- John Lennon – double-tracked vocal, double-tracked acoustic guitar
