= Mimi Smith =

Aunt and parental guardian of John Lennon (1906–1991)

- Smith in 1964
- Born: Mary Elizabeth Stanley; 24 April 1906; Liverpool, England
- Died: 6 December 1991 (aged 85); Poole, Dorset, England
- Occupations: Nurse, secretary, housewife
- Spouse: George Smith (m. 1939; died 1955)
- Relatives: Julia Lennon (sister); John Lennon (nephew); Julia Baird (niece); Julian Lennon (great-nephew); Sean Lennon (great-nephew)

Mary Elizabeth "Mimi" Smith (née Stanley; 24 April 1906 – 6 December 1991), informally known as Aunt Mimi, was a maternal aunt and the parental guardian of the English musician John Lennon. She was born in Toxteth, Liverpool, as the oldest of five daughters. She became a resident trainee nurse at the Woolton Convalescent Hospital and later worked as a private secretary. On 15 September 1939, she married George Toogood Smith, who ran his family's dairy farm and a shop in Woolton, a suburb of Liverpool.

After her younger sister Julia Lennon separated from her husband, Julia and her son, the young John Lennon, moved in with a new partner, but Smith contacted Liverpool's Social Services and complained about his sleeping in the same bed as the two adults. Julia was eventually persuaded to hand over the care of John to the Smiths. He lived with the Smiths for most of his childhood and remained close to his aunt, even though she was highly dismissive of his musical ambitions, his girlfriends and wives. She often told the teenage Lennon: "The guitar's all right, John, but you'll never make a living out of it".

In 1965, John bought her a bungalow in Poole, Dorset, where she lived until her death in 1991. Despite later losing touch with other family members, he kept in close contact with Mimi and telephoned her every week until his death in 1980. The Smiths' original Liverpool house was later bought and donated to The National Trust by John's widow Yoko Ono.

== The Stanley family ==
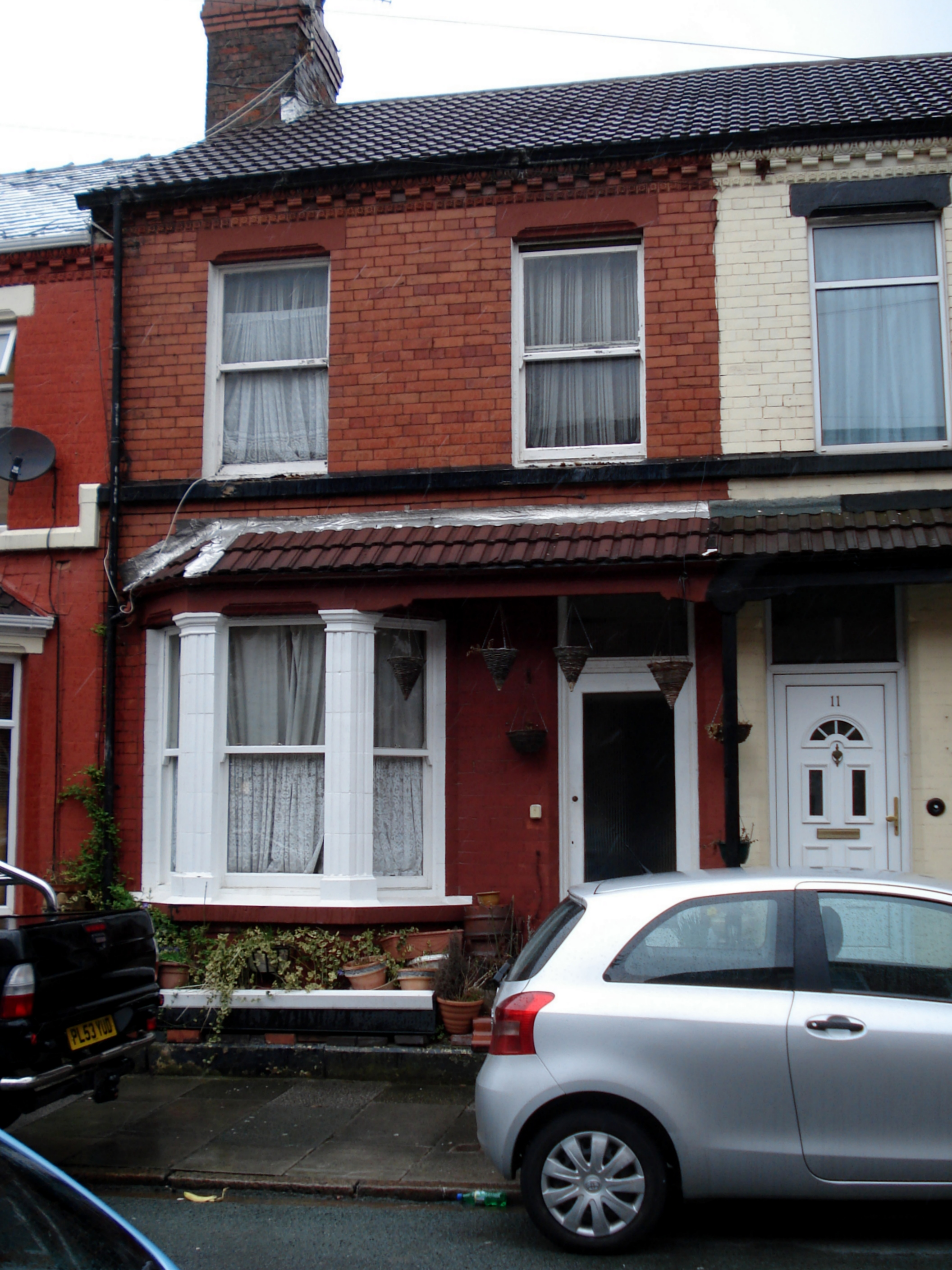
9 Newcastle Road, Liverpool; the former home of the Stanley family

According to Lennon, the Stanley family once owned the whole of Woolton village. William Stanley, 6th Earl of Derby, did once own the manorial rights to Woolton but Lennon's Stanley family were from humbler origins and came to Liverpool in the 1870s. Smith's grandfather was born in Birmingham and her great grandfather was born in London. Smith's father, George Ernest Stanley, was born in the Everton district of Liverpool in 1874 to William Henry Stanley and Eliza Jane Gildea; Eliza was born in Omagh, County Tyrone, Ulster, Ireland. By 1891 the Stanleys were living in Upper Frederick Street, south of the city centre, in the same inner city area of Liverpool as the family of George's future wife, Annie Jane Millward, who was born in Chester in 1873 to Welsh parents. George Ernest Stanley and Annie Millward were married at St Peter's Church, Liverpool (since demolished) on 19 November 1906. Stanley was a merchant seaman often away at sea so was absent from some census records.

Mimi was the couple's first daughter, born seven months before her parents married. Four more daughters followed: Elizabeth Jane ("Mater"; 1908–1976); Annie Georgina ("Nanny"; 1911–1988); Julia ("Judy"; 1914–1958); and Harriet ("Harrie"; 1916–1972). After the birth of his daughters, Stanley stopped going to sea and got a job with the Liverpool and Glasgow Tug Salvage Company as an insurance investigator. He moved his family to the Liverpool suburb of Allerton, where they lived in a small terraced house at 9 Newcastle Road. According to Beatles biographer Bob Spitz, Mimi assumed a matriarchal role in the Stanley house to help her mother, and dressed "as if she was on her way to a weekly garden club meeting". Friends of Lennon later stated that his aunt based everything on decorum, honesty, and a black-and-white attitude: "Either you were good enough or you were not." Annie Stanley died in 1941, and Mimi accepted the responsibility of caring for her father with help from Julia.

When other girls were thinking of marriage, Smith talked of challenges and adventures that arose from her attitude of "stubborn independence", and often said that she never wanted to get married because she hated the idea of being "tied to the kitchen sink". She became a resident trainee nurse at the Woolton Convalescent Hospital, and later worked as a private secretary for Ernest Vickers, who was an industrial magnate with businesses in Manchester and Liverpool. She had long-term plans to buy a house in a "respected suburb" of Liverpool one day so that she could entertain the "scholars and dignitaries of Liverpool society".

== Marriage and 'Mendips' ==
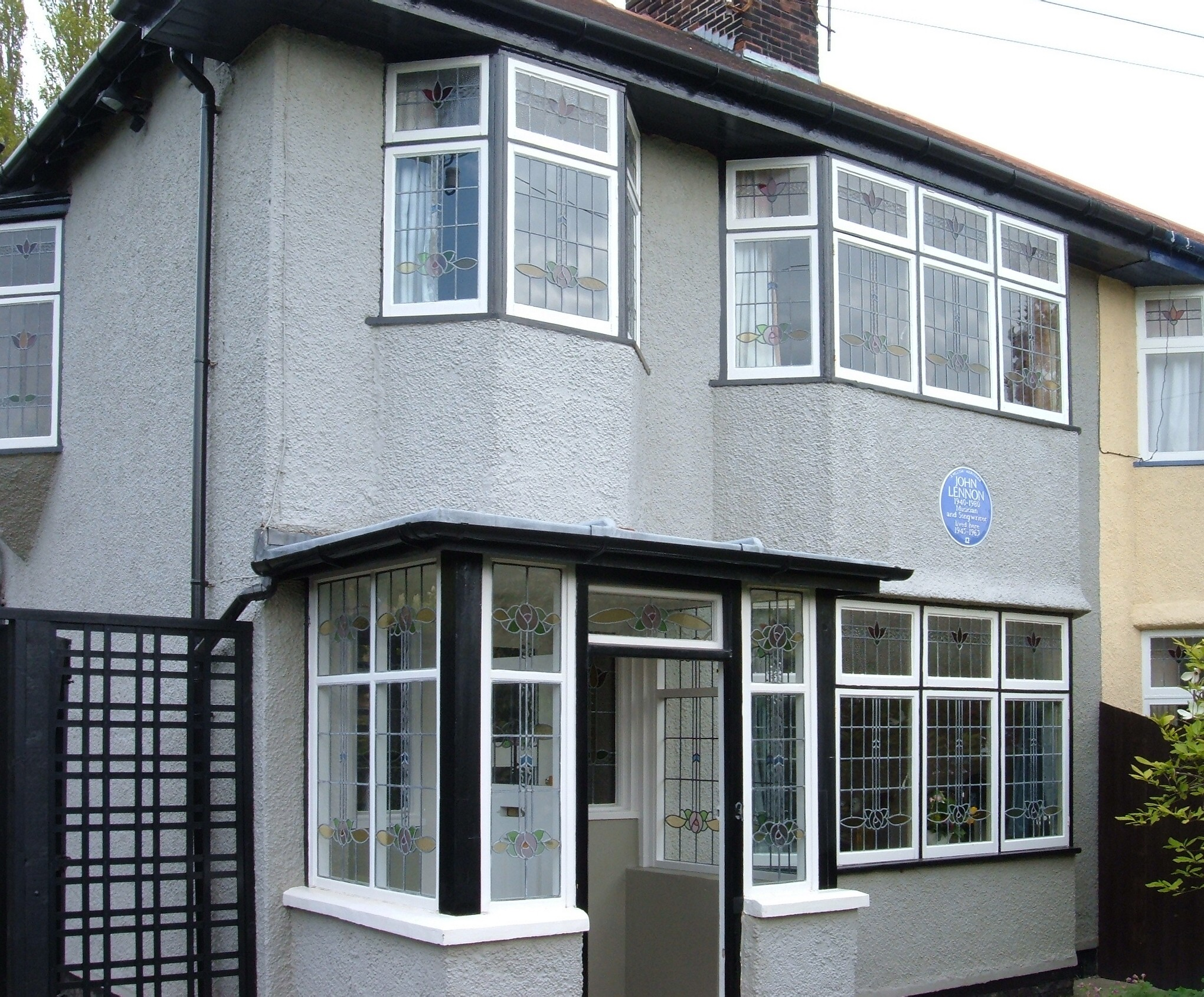
'Mendips', the Smiths' former home, which is now owned by the National Trust

In early 1932 she met George Smith, who lived across from the hospital where she worked, and to which he delivered milk every morning. Smith and his brother Frank operated a dairy farm and a shop in Woolton that had been in the Smith family for four generations. Smith started courting Mimi, but was constantly thwarted by her indifference and her father's interference. Stanley would allow the couple to sit in the back room at Newcastle Road only when he or his wife were in the front room, and before it grew too late he would burst into the back room and loudly order Smith home. The courtship lasted almost seven years, but Smith grew tired of waiting. After delivering milk to the hospital one morning he gave her an ultimatum that she must marry him, "or nothing at all!"

Mimi and Smith were finally married on 15 September 1939. They bought a semi-detached house called Mendips – named after the range of hills – at 251 Menlove Avenue, in a middle-class area of Liverpool. Menlove Avenue suffered extensive damage during World War II, and Mimi said that she often had to throw a wet blanket on incendiary bombs that fell in the garden. During the war, the government took over the Smiths' farmland for war work, and Smith was called up for service. However, he was discharged three years later and worked in an aircraft factory in Speke until the end of the war. Smith later left the milk trade and started a small bookmaker's business, which led Mimi to complain later that he was a compulsive gambler and had lost most of their money.

== John Lennon ==
Mimi's sister Julia married Alfred Lennon on 3 December 1938; on 9 October 1940, the couple's first and only child was born. Smith phoned the Oxford Street Maternity Hospital that evening and was told that Julia had given birth to a boy. According to Smith, she went straight to the hospital "as fast as [her] legs could carry me", during the middle of an air raid, and was forced to hide in doorways to avoid the shrapnel. Smith later recalled a story that began with a parachute-borne landmine landing outside the hospital: "My sister stayed in bed, and they put the baby under the bed. They wanted me to go into the basement, but I wouldn't. I ran all the way back to Newcastle Road to tell Father the news. 'Get under the shelter,' the wardens were shouting. 'Oh, be quiet,' I told them."

The story about the air raid has since been refuted, as there was no attack that night. The previous raid had been on 21–22 September, and the next was on 16 October, when the areas of Walton and Everton were badly hit.

After Julia separated from her husband, she and the infant Lennon moved in with her new partner, John Albert "Bobby" Dykins. However, Smith twice contacted Liverpool's Social Services and complained about John sleeping in the same bed as Julia and Dykins. Julia was eventually persuaded to hand over the care of John to the Smiths, who had no children of their own. Smith later confided to a relative that although she had never wanted children, she had "always wanted John". In July 1946, Alfred Lennon visited the Smiths and took Lennon to Blackpool, ostensibly for a long holiday, but with the secret intention of emigrating to New Zealand with him. Julia went to Blackpool and took John back to her house, but a few weeks later she handed him back to Smith. John then lived continuously at Mendips in the smallest bedroom, which was located above the front door. Although she was a caring guardian, Smith was also known for being very strict, compared to the more relaxing influence of her husband and John's mother. Family friends described Smith as stubborn, impatient and unforgiving, but also said that she had a strong sense of humour. On many occasions when she criticised John, he would respond with a joke and the two of them would be "rolling around, laughing together".

Smith bought volumes of short stories for John, and her husband taught him to read at the age of five by reading aloud the headlines of the Liverpool Echo. Every summer between 1949 and 1955, Smith sent John alone on a ten-hour bus journey to visit his Aunt Mater and her family at their home near Loch Meadie in Durness, on the north coast of Scotland. Smith also took her charge to a garden party in Calderstones Park every year, where a Salvation Army band played. Strawberry Field, in Beaconsfield Road, was the name of a Salvation Army house that Lennon would later immortalise in the Beatles' song, "Strawberry Fields Forever". She would later say: "John loved his uncle George. I felt quite left out of that. They'd go off together, just leaving me a bar of chocolate and a note saying 'Have a happy day'".

The Smiths had rented their two first-floor bedrooms to students for extra income since 1947, while the Smiths slept in the former dining room on the ground floor. One of the students who lodged there included John Cavill, who stayed from September 1949 until June 1950. Cavill played piano, but as the house had none he bought a guitar; admitting he knew almost nothing about chords: "My father had a violin and I had learned to play pizzicato on it, so when I got the guitar I played tunes on the strings, and John [Lennon] did the same".

George Smith died of a liver haemorrhage in June 1955, leaving £2,000 in his will (equivalent to £45,500 in 2025). Three years later, Julia was killed on Menlove Avenue when she was knocked down by a car driven by an off-duty police officer, PC Eric Clague. Smith did not witness the fatal collision, but cried hysterically over Julia's body until the ambulance arrived. Clague was acquitted of all charges, given a reprimand and a short suspension from duty; when Smith heard the verdict, she shouted "Murderer!" at Clague.

After John Lennon became famous, Smith berated him for speaking in a Liverpudlian accent, but Lennon replied: "That's show business. They want me to speak more Liverpool.” Despite the talk of Lennon being working class – as were Paul McCartney, George Harrison and Ringo Starr – he later rejected the idea, saying, "I was a nice clean-cut suburban boy." Later comparing his pre-fame living circumstances at Mendips with those of the other Beatles, he said, "In the class system it was about a half an inch in a higher class than Paul, George and Ringo, who lived in subsidised government houses. We owned our own house, had our own garden. They didn't have anything like that".

=== John Lennon and music ===
Although Smith later claimed that she had bought John's first guitar, it was actually his mother who did so, after Lennon had pestered her incessantly for weeks. Julia insisted that the £5 instrument (equivalent to £100 in 2025) had to be delivered to her house and not to her sister's. The two sisters first saw John perform with the Quarrymen at the St Peter's Church, Woolton fête on the afternoon of 6 July 1957. Julia, who knew that her son would be performing, heard music coming from the field behind the church (now the site of the Bishop Martin School), and pulled Smith along with her to listen. John saw his aunt coming through the crowd and comically changed the words of a song to feature her name: "Oh-oh, here comes Mimi down the aisle now...". Smith related two versions of what she thought that day after seeing him on stage: "I was horrified to behold John in front of a microphone", and "as pleased as Punch to see him up there".

With help from Smith and John's headmaster, Lennon was accepted into the Liverpool College of Art because his aunt insisted that he should have some sort of academic qualifications, even though he was beginning to show an interest in music. She opposed the idea of John forming a band and disapproved of Paul McCartney because he was "working class", calling him "John's little friend". When she later met George Harrison, she "hated him" because of his thick Scouse accent and Teddy Boy clothes. John and Paul often met at Mendips to write songs, and rehearsed in the glass-panelled porch at the front of the house, which was the only place where they were allowed to play. Mimi once asked Stanley Parkes, her nephew through her sister Mater, to take her to The Cavern to see John and the Beatles play. However, when she descended into the cellar full of screaming teenagers, she shouted to Parkes, "Get him [Lennon] out, get him out! Tell him to come off the stage! He can't stay here.... We'll have to stop this!" The band's first residency in Hamburg exasperated her because she wanted Lennon to continue his studies, but he placated her by greatly exaggerating the sum of money he would earn.

She hoped Lennon would become bored with music; often saying, "The guitar's all right, John, but you'll never make a living out of it". In later years, Lennon would jokingly remind her of the comment, and later had a silver plaque made engraved with her words. When later asked about the plaque, she would say that Lennon had it made for her husband, and not her.

== John Lennon's relationships ==
Smith's attitude to John's romantic partners was often frosty, disdainful or sarcastic.

She once referred to Cynthia as "a gangster's moll", and was particularly unpleasant toward her. In summer 1962, Cynthia discovered that she was pregnant with Lennon's child and he proposed marriage; Smith attempted to stop him going through with it by threatening never to speak to him again. According to Mimi herself, as quoted in 'Shout!' (Phillip Norman), she said to the couple, "I'll say one thing only, and then I'll hold my peace. You're too young! There now, I've said it." John and Cynthia married on 23 August at the Mount Pleasant Register office in Liverpool. Smith did not attend. Lennon had wanted his half-sisters, cousins and aunts to be there, but Smith had contacted them beforehand and advised them against attending. After the Lennons had been living at Brian Epstein's flat for a few months (and after hearing about Cynthia's near-miscarriage), Mimi offered to rent her downstairs back room to them.

Before Christmas 1972, Mimi and then-divorced Cynthia met again at the funeral of Smith's youngest sister Harriet. Smith sternly criticised Cynthia for both divorcing Lennon and letting him start a relationship with Yoko Ono, saying she should have stopped him from making "an idiot of himself". Even though Smith was described as domineering, Ono later compared herself to her when describing her own relationship with Lennon, and Smith later admitted that Ono was a good wife and mother. After Lennon's death, Ono and Sean Lennon visited Smith in Liverpool, where she was staying at her sister Annie's house because of a heart condition. She said, "Sean is like John in every way – looks and manner – and he has got John's sense of humour. As long as he keeps away from music, he will be all right".

Ono later bought Mendips and donated it to The National Trust. It was renovated to make it look as it was in the 1950s when Lennon lived there, and Ono paid a visit before it was opened to the public. Lennon's cousin, Michael Cadwallader, had advised the National Trust on how the house looked when the Smiths lived there.

== Later years ==
Smith had relatives in Eketāhuna, New Zealand, as her maternal aunt Harriet Millward had married and moved there. Smith had exchanged letters with her relatives there for years, so Lennon arranged for a tour of New Zealand in 1964. The success of the Beatles caused problems for her and she was constantly pestered by fans at 'Mendips', so she sold the house for £6,000 in 1965 (equivalent to £101,600 in 2025); Lennon bought her a £25,000 bungalow (equivalent to £423,300 in 2025) by the beach called Harbour's Edge in Sandbanks, at 126 Panorama Road, Poole, Dorset, which was her home for the rest of her life. The Lennons and their son visited her there in the summer of 1965, which was the last time all three of them visited the house together. Lennon gave his aunt his MBE medal, but later asked for it back so that he could return it in protest.

Lennon gave Smith an allowance of £30 per week (equivalent to £600 in 2025), but when she found out that Lennon's first wife's mother was being given the same amount, she phoned the Lennons' house and said, "What has she [Cynthia's mother] done to deserve anything? Tell John, when you speak to him, that I am very, very annoyed", before slamming down the phone. Lennon moved to New York in 1971, and never returned to England again. Despite losing touch with several family members, he kept in close contact with her and telephoned her every week. In a 1981 television interview with Southern Television reporter Christopher Peacock, Smith stated that she spoke with Lennon by phone the night before he was murdered. He called her to say he was homesick and was planning a trip back to England. After Lennon's death, Smith was furious to find out that he had never transferred the ownership of the house over to her, which meant that Ono owned the house and could sell it at any time.

=== Death ===
Smith died on 6 December 1991, at the age of 85, while being cared for at home by auxiliary nurse Lynne Varcoe. On the day of her death, Smith collapsed in the bathroom, so Varcoe helped her to her bed, where Smith started Cheyne-Stokes respiration. According to Varcoe, her last words were, "Hello, John".

Although the oldest of the Stanley sisters, Smith was the last to die. Cynthia, Sean and Ono attended her funeral on 12 December 1991: McCartney, Harrison and Starr all sent floral arrangements. Despite the animosity between Cynthia and Smith, Varcoe remembered Cynthia crying throughout the whole funeral, and said that Smith had always spoken positively about her. Smith was cremated at the Poole Crematorium and the reception was at the Harbour Heights Hotel. The whereabouts of her ashes is unknown. Ono put Smith's house up for sale on the same day as the cremation; it was demolished in 1994, so a four-bedroomed house could be built on the site. The new house on the site is now called 'Imagine'.

== Portrayals in film ==
Smith was portrayed on film by Eileen Kennally in Birth of the Beatles (1979), by Val McLane in John and Yoko: A Love Story (1985), by Blair Brown in In His Life: The John Lennon Story (2000), and by Kristin Scott Thomas in Nowhere Boy (2009).

== Bibliography ==
- Cavill, Guy (2011). The John Lennon Story (Kindle ed.). G2 Entertainment. ASIN: B0053H5PAU.
- Harry, Bill (2000). The John Lennon Encyclopedia. Virgin Books. ISBN 978-0-7535-0404-8.
- Lennon, Cynthia (2005). John. Hodder & Stoughton. ISBN 978-0-340-89512-2.
- Miles, Barry (1997). Many Years From Now. Vintage-Random House. ISBN 978-0-7493-8658-0.
- Miles, Barry (1998). Charlesworth, Chris (ed.). The Beatles: a diary. Omnibus Press. ISBN 978-0-7119-6315-3.
- Norman, Philip (1993). Shout!. Pan Books. ISBN 978-0-330-48768-9.
- Spitz, Bob (2005). The Beatles – The Biography. Little, Brown and Company. ISBN 978-0-316-80352-6.
- The Beatles (2003). The Beatles Anthology (DVD). Apple records. ASIN: B00008GKEG.
- Turner, Steve (2006). The Gospel According to The Beatles. US: Westminster/John Knox Press. ISBN 978-0664229832.
