= Woolton Picture House =

Privately owned cinema in Liverpool, England

Coordinates: 53°22′31.7″N 2°52′03.5″W

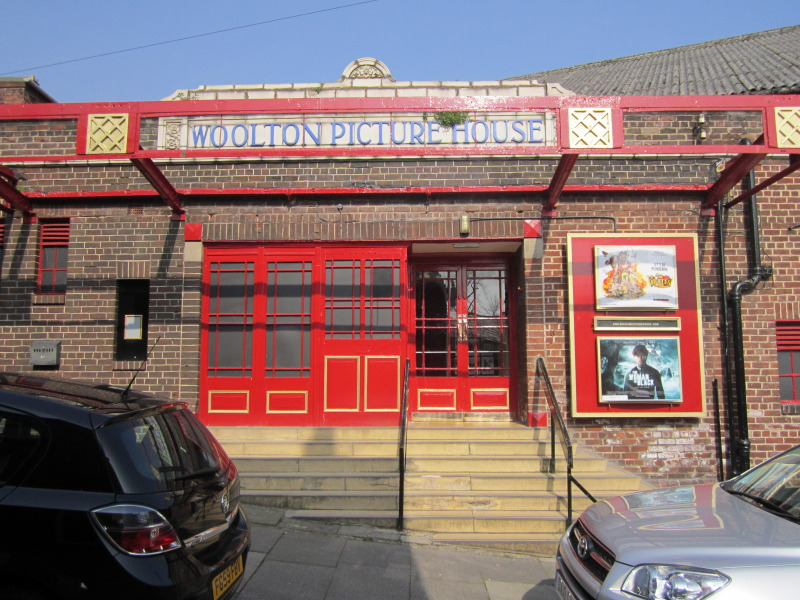
Entrance to Woolton Picture House

Woolton Picture House (also known as Woolton Cinema) is a privately owned cinema in the Woolton area of Liverpool, England. It is the only remaining single-screen cinema in the city, and is popular with cinema enthusiasts because of its old-fashioned atmosphere. The music of Mantovani plays before the main programme and in the traditional halfway interval, during which ice cream can be bought from usherettes.

It was purchased in 1992 by David Wood, the grandson of Liverpool cinema pioneer John Frederick Wood. Wood died on 12 June 2006 leading to the cinema's closure on 3 September. Pirates of the Caribbean: Dead Man's Chest was the last film to be shown. In 2007, a group of entrepreneurs purchased the cinema and re-opened it on 29 March 2007 with a screening of The Queen.

The 2020 coronavirus pandemic led to the closure of the establishment, but a crowd-funding effort on Go Fund Me has raised £20,000, and has since become a landmark for people in Liverpool and citizens of Woolton and the owners have suspended redundancies whilst they evaluate the availability of grants from the BFI and other sources.

== Timeline ==
1926 - The Woolton Picture House was designed by L.A.G Prichard, a well established architect and was built for Alfred Adams who formed the Woolton Picture House Co. Ltd. to operate the cinema.

1930 - The auditorium originally held a seating capacity of over 800, composing of several rows of wooden benches. Although during the 1930s the screen was brought forward to accommodate larger speakers for an enhanced cinematic experience.

1938 - 45 - Remaining open throughout the war years, surviving the bombing raids of WW2, the cinema provided the local community a vital window to the front line, courtesy of Pathé newsreel.

1954 - The cinema acquired a new owner and was handed to Robert Godfrey of Cheshire Country Cinemas.

1958 - The onset of a fire at the front of the screen drastically altered the cinema, almost destroying the public area of the Auditorium. The building survived but remained closed for 3 months during extensive repairs.

1992 - Woolton Picture House was re-owned by David Wood, grandson of the cinema pioneer John. F. Wood.

2006 - The sudden misfortune of the unexpected death of David Swindell the chief projectionist, followed shortly after by the death of the owner David Wood, lead to the second closure of the cinema.

2007 - Woolton Picture House was purchased by a local business man and reopened, with a full house.

2009 - Woolton Picture House become the set for the film Nowhere Boy, a biopic of John Lennon's adolescence and the creation of his first band The Quarrymen and its evolution into the Beatles.

2010 - The cinema celebrated the film Premier of the Blockbuster movie Madrasapattinam with film stars hosting the cinema's red carpet event.

2020 - Due to unforeseen financial hardships that the COVID-19 pandemic brought, Woolton Picture House closed.

2022 - Press reports suggest Woolton Picture House may reopen.

2025 - Woolton Picture House temporarily reopened in December for the first time in 5 years. 12 Christmas films were shown over 12 days. Woolton Cinema Community Interest Company (WCCIC) is trying to raise £700,000 to buy the building and carry out the repairs so that the cinema can reopen permanently.
