= Strawberry Field =

English orphanage built in 1870

Coordinates: 53°22′49″N 2°53′2″W

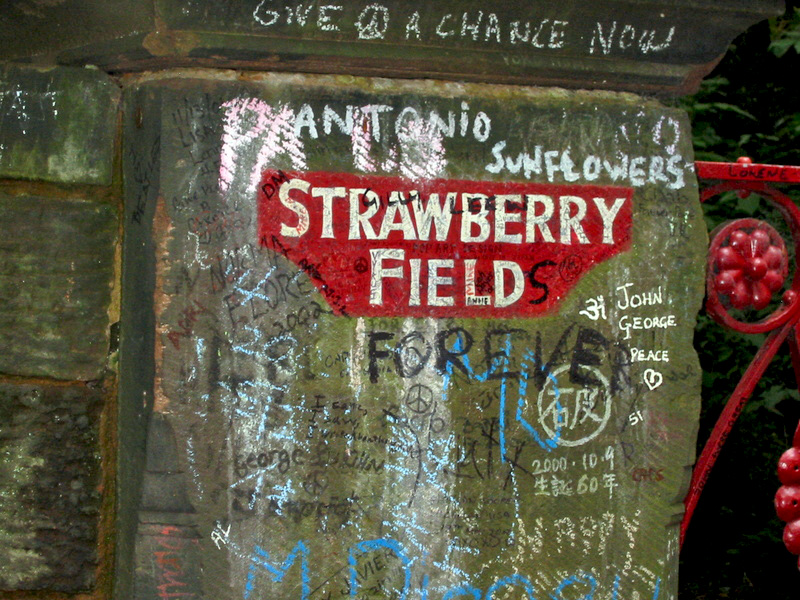
A 2002 image of the gatepost, with graffiti from Beatles fans

Strawberry Field is a former children's home in the Liverpool suburb of Woolton in England, which was in operation between 1936 and 2005. It is currently a tourist attraction and Christian centered owned and operated by the Salvation Army. The grounds originally contained a Gothic style mansion, built as a private residence in the Victorian era (c. 1870), which was later acquired by the Salvation Army in 1934. The original house was demolished in 1973 due to structural problems, and replaced with purpose-built units. After being closed as a children's home, the site has continued to be used by the Salvation Army for other purposes.

The location gained worldwide fame following the release of the Beatles' 1967 single "Strawberry Fields Forever". The song's writer, John Lennon, had grown up nearby and played in the grounds of the home as a child. In time, the old red-painted entrance gates on Beaconsfield Road became a place of pilgrimage for Beatles fans. In 2019, Strawberry Field was opened to the public for the first time, with an exhibition on its history, cafe, shop, and a prayer centere, alongside a training centre for young people with special educational needs.

== History ==
The earliest reference to the Gothic Revival mansion Strawberry Field dates from 1870, when it was owned by wealthy shipping magnate George Warren. On an 1891 Ordnance Survey map, the building and its grounds appear as the plural Strawberry Fields, although this had changed by the 1905 survey. In 1912, it was transferred to another wealthy merchant whose widow sold the estate to the Salvation Army in 1934. It was opened as a children's home on 7 July 1936 by Lady Bates in the presence of General Evangeline Booth, daughter of Salvation Army founders William Booth and Catherine Booth. It initially housed up to 40 girls; boys under the age of five were introduced in the 1950s. Later, older boys also became resident.

== The Beatles ==
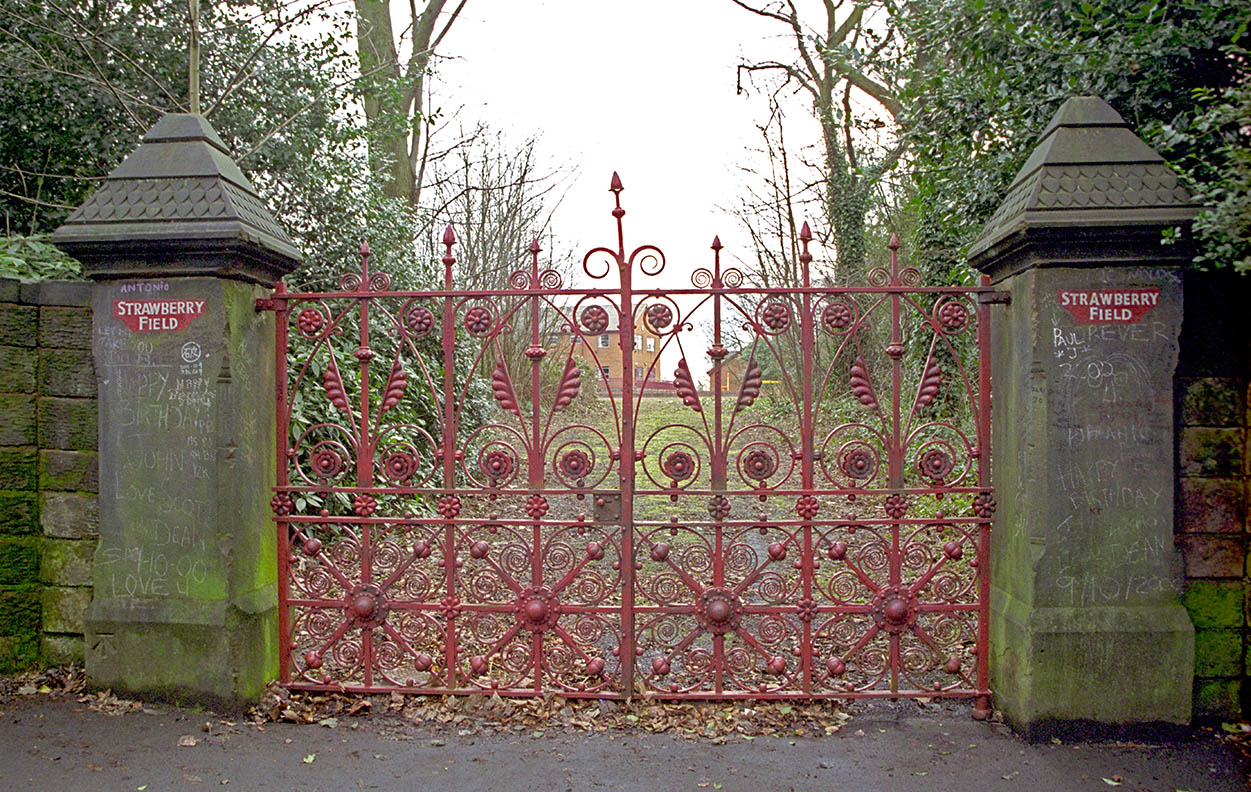
The gates of Strawberry Field

The name of the home became famous in 1967 with the release of the Beatles' single "Strawberry Fields Forever", written by John Lennon, who had grown up at nearby 251 Menlove Avenue. Beaconsfield Road, where Strawberry Field is located, is a side street from Menlove Avenue. One of Lennon's few childhood treats was the garden party that took place on the grounds of Strawberry Field each summer. Lennon's Aunt Mimi recalled, "As soon as we could hear the Salvation Army Band starting, John would jump up and down shouting, 'Mimi, come on. We're going to be late.'"

== Legacy ==
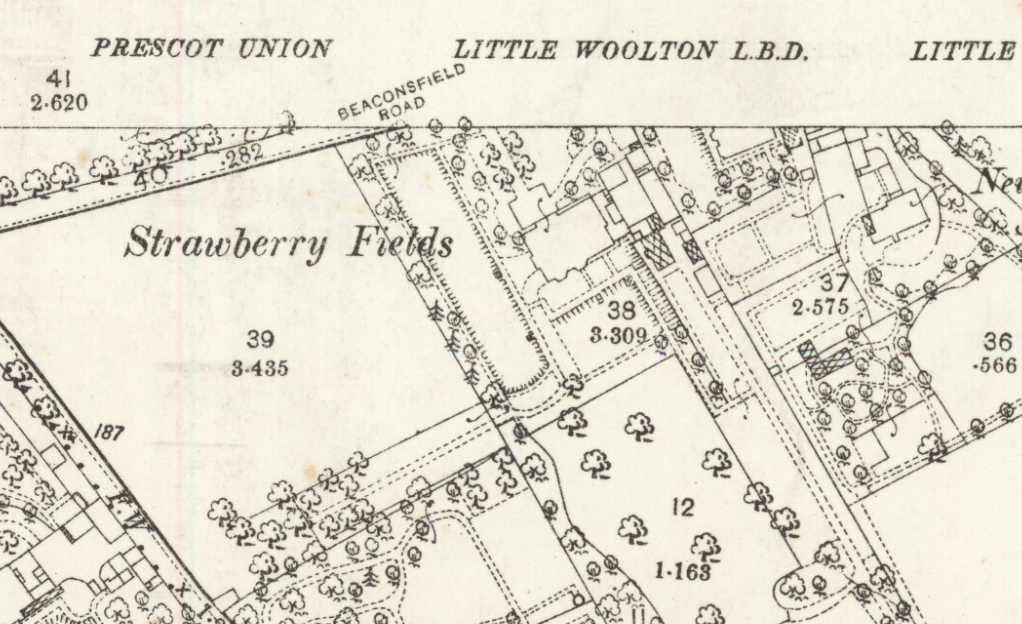
Strawberry Fields shown on the 25-inch Ordnance Survey of 1891

Strawberry Field was recognised by Nikolaus Pevsner in his 1969 survey of the buildings of South Lancashire. However, by then, the building was increasingly unfit for purpose. By 1973, structural problems such as dry rot meant that it was more cost-effective to demolish the building and replace it with a purpose-built children's home. This new home provided three family units, each accommodating 12 children. The driveway entrance to the building was moved further west along Beaconsfield Road so the gateposts bearing the name of Strawberry Field were no longer used. Throughout the 1970s and beyond, the disused entrance and its gates became a mecca for Beatles fans from around the world. As a result, the gates continued to be painted bright red; the painted nameplates were also maintained.

=== 21st century ===
The children's home closed in January 2005, and the building was used by the Salvation Army as a church and prayer centre. The gates marking its entrance were removed and replaced with replicas in May 2011.

The Salvation Army opened Strawberry Field to the public for the first time in September 2019, allowing visitors to explore the grounds. Incorporated in the grounds is a training centre for young people with special educational needs and a new exhibition space dedicated to the story of the place, John Lennon, the writing and recording of The Beatles “Strawberry Fields Forever” and The Salvation Army, together with a cafe and gift shop.

The visitor exhibition contains a tour which tells stories of the formation of The Salvation Army and its work at the original children’s home, John Lennon's childhood and early inspiration, and the song 'Strawberry Fields Forever' through multimedia and interviews including an introduction by Paul McCartney and memorabilia relating to Lennon's inspiration. The media guide has commentary by John Lennon’s half-sister Julia Baird, who is Honorary President of Strawberry Field.

In the exhibition is the Steinway piano on which Lennon composed and recorded "Imagine" which is on loan from the estate of George Michael. The gardens where John Lennon once found sanctuary now house the original red gates which were returned to Strawberry Field after being stolen in 2000.

In May 2023 the Strawberry Field Bandstand opened. Donated by Cliff Cooper, founder and CEO of Orange Amps, the bandstand features an "Imagine" mosaic floor which references the mosaic in the Central Park, New York Strawberry Fields memorial, and the back wall features a mural depicting the history of John Lennon and The Salvation Army at the Strawberry Field site.

The Ukrainian Peace Monument was unveiled at Strawberry Field in May 2023. It will remain in Liverpool until it is safe to move it to a permanent home in Ukraine.
