= In His Life: The John Lennon Story =

2000 television film directed by David Carson

- Cover of an NBC press kit about the film
- Written by: Michael O'Hara
- Directed by: David Carson
- Starring: Philip McQuillan, Blair Brown
- Music by: Dennis McCarthy
- Country of origin: United States
- Original language: English

Production
- Producer: Colin McKeown
- Cinematography: Lawrence Jones
- Editor: Lisa Bromwell
- Running time: 85 minutes
- Production companies: Michael O'Hara Productions; NBC Studios

Original release
- Release: December 3, 2000

In His Life: The John Lennon Story is a 2000 American made-for-television biographical film about John Lennon's teenage years, written by the film's executive producer, Michael O'Hara, and directed by David Carson.

== Plot ==
Beginning in Liverpool in the 1950s, the film concentrates on the early life of John Lennon (Philip McQuillen) as he struggles to become a successful musician in the embryonic stages of British rock and roll. Lennon goes on to form a number of bands, widening his local audience as he develops, before later joining with Stuart Sutcliffe (Lee Williams), George Harrison (Mark Rice-Oxley), Pete Best (Scot Williams) and Paul McCartney (Daniel McGowan) to form the Beatles. The group attract the attention of music promoter Brian Epstein (Jamie Glover) who engineers their success and fame. However, Sutcliffe leaves the band to pursue a career in painting, and Best is dropped from the band to be replaced by Ringo Starr (Kristian Ealey).

The film focuses on eight years of Lennon's youth, from age 16 to 23, from his teenage years living with his aunt Mimi Smith at 251 Menlove Avenue to the early successes of the Beatles. It deals with Lennon's abandonment by his father, the double loss of his mother (first to another family and then to an accident), his introduction to McCartney at St. Peter's Church Hall, his courting and marriage to his first wife, Cynthia (Gillian Kearney), being disowned by his family after his aunt Mimi learned he got Cynthia pregnant outside of marriage, the loss of his best friend Sutcliffe, the birth of his son Julian, and the early popularity of the Beatles in Germany.

Also shown are recreated scenes from the Quarrymen, the German era, and the Cavern Club performances. The film ends with the Beatles' first appearance on The Ed Sullivan Show.

== Main cast ==
- Philip McQuillan as John Lennon
- Blair Brown as Mimi Smith
- Christine Kavanagh as Julia Lennon
- Gillian Kearney as Cynthia Lennon
- Daniel McGowan as Paul McCartney
- Mark Rice-Oxley as George Harrison
- Lee Williams as Stuart Sutcliffe (the original Beatles bassist)
- Jamie Glover as Brian Epstein (the Beatles' manager)
- Kristian Ealey as Ringo Starr
- Scot Williams as Pete Best (the original film drummer of the Beatles)
- Palina Jonsdottir as Astrid Kirchherr (Stuart Sutcliffe's German girlfriend and photographer)
- Michael Ryan as Rory Quinn
- Alex Cox as Bruno Koschmider
- Anthony Borrows as young John Lennon
- Paul Usher as "Freddie" Lennon
- Neil Brannan as Pete Shotton

== Production ==
The film script is written by Michael O'Hara, a former NBC publicity agent who began writing screenplays in 1989 and went into film production in 1991, usually writing and producing TV films for his old employer, NBC.

The film was largely shot in Liverpool, and includes inside and outside scenes from the 251 Menlove Avenue house where Lennon grew up; St Peter's Church Hall, where he first met McCartney; Liverpool College of Art and Quarry Bank High School, where Lennon was a pupil; as well as numerous musical venues where the early Beatles performed. It was the first time the owner of the Menlove Avenue house allowed a film crew inside, and also allowed them to knock down a downstairs wall to make room for the cameras. This resulted in 150 bricks, which later were sold to Beatles' fans.

== Awards and nominations ==
The film was nominated for an award in 2001 for "Best Edited Motion Picture for Commercial Television", by the American Cinema Editors.
