= Julia Baird =

Julia Baird may refer to:

- Julia Baird (teacher) (born 1947), British teacher and half-sister of John Lennon
- Julia Baird (journalist) (born 1970), Australian journalist
