= George Toogood Smith =

John Lennon's uncle (1903–1955)

- Born: March 13, 1903; Woolton, Liverpool, England
- Died: 5 June 1955 (aged 52); Woolton, Liverpool, England
- Occupations: Milkman, Bookmaker
- Spouse: Mimi Stanley (m. 1939)

George Toogood Smith (13 March 1903 – 5 June 1955) was the maternal uncle, through marriage, of John Lennon. Smith operated his family's two dairy farms and a retail outlet with his brother, Frank Smith, in the village of Woolton, Liverpool. The farms had been in the Smith family for four generations, but after the start of the Second World War, they were taken over by the British Government for war work.

Smith started courting Mimi Stanley in the spring of 1932, but was thwarted by her indifference and her father's interference. After delivering milk to the hospital where she worked he gave her an ultimatum that she must marry him, "or nothing at all!" On 15 September 1939, she finally married him. They bought a semi-detached house called Mendips, named after the range of hills, at 251 Menlove Avenue, Liverpool.

Lennon lived with Smith and his wife for the majority of his childhood, and Smith taught the young Lennon to read, read him nursery rhymes at night, and later taught Lennon how to solve crossword puzzles. He also taught him to draw and paint and bought him his first mouth organ. Smith collapsed and died on 5 June 1955 aged 52 at his home of a liver haemorrhage. He was buried in St Peter's Church graveyard, Woolton.

== Early years ==
George Toogood Smith's parents, Francis and Alice Smith, had eight children in total; Mary, Eleanor, Francis, Robert, Alice, George, Alfred and one other who died. Robert was killed in action on 30 August 1918 in World War I. George's paternal grandmother's maiden name was Toogood which was given to George as a middle name. His mother died in 1949. George had a childhood friend who was a descent of William III of the Netherlands. Smith operated his family's two dairy farms and a shop with his brother Frank in the village of Woolton. The farms had been in the Smith family for four generations. Smith delivered milk by horse and cart in the Woolton area. The raw milk he provided was stored in a large churn and was ladled out into the bottles and receptacles of customers.

When other girls were thinking of marriage, Mimi Stanley talked of challenges and adventures. She once confided that she never wanted to get married, as she hated the idea of being "tied to the kitchen sink". She became a resident trainee nurse at the Woolton Convalescent Hospital, to which Smith delivered milk every morning. Smith started seriously courting Mimi in the spring of 1932, but was constantly thwarted by her indifference and her father's interference. George Stanley (Mimi's father) would only allow the couple to sit in the back room of the family home in Newcastle Road when he or his wife were in the front room, and before it grew too late he would burst into the back room and loudly order Smith home. The courtship lasted almost seven years, but Smith grew tired of waiting, so after delivering milk to the hospital one morning he gave her an ultimatum that she must marry him, "or nothing at all!" The second youngest sister of the Stanley family, Julia Stanley, had married Alfred Lennon nine months before, on 3 December 1938.

=== Marriage ===
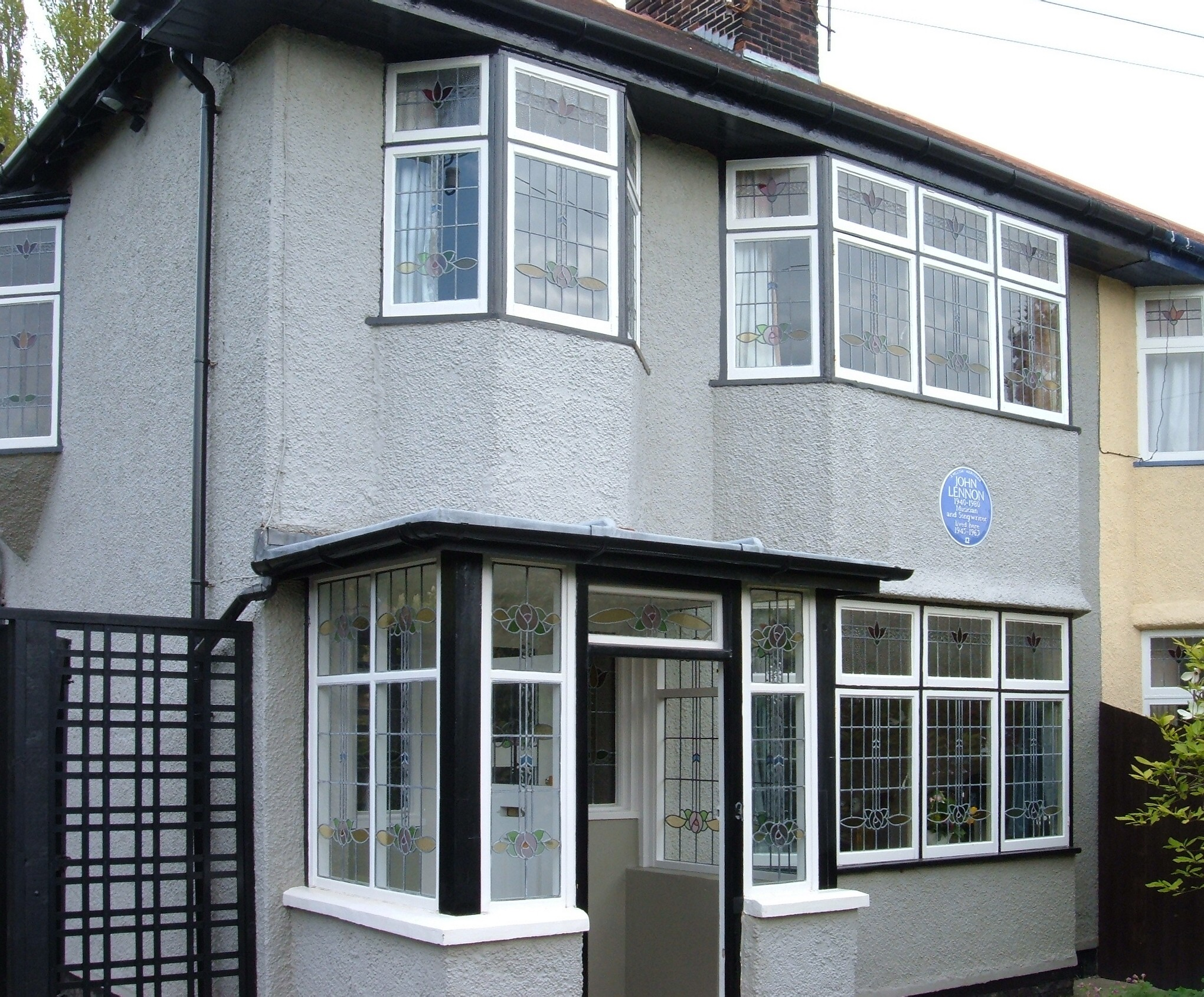
Mendips, Smith and Mimi's home

On 15 September 1939, Mimi finally married Smith. They bought a semi-detached house called Mendips (named after the range of hills) at 251 Menlove Avenue (across the road from the Allerton Park golf course) in a middle-class area of Liverpool. After World War II started the British Government took over the Smith family's farmland for war work, and they had to find other sources of income.

Menlove Avenue suffered extensive damage during the war, and Smith and his wife often had to throw a wet blanket on incendiary bombs that fell in their garden. Smith was called up for military service, but was discharged three years later, and subsequently worked in an aircraft factory in Speke until the end of the war. Smith later left the milk trade and started a small bookmaker's business, which led his wife to complain that Smith was a compulsive gambler, and had lost most of their money. During 1942–1943, Mimi's sister Julia lived with Lennon at The Dairy Cottage, 120a Allerton Road, Woolton, which was owned by the Smith family.

=== John Lennon ===
Lennon lived with Smith and his wife for the majority of his childhood when his mother Julia (under pressure from the local authorities, Mimi, and the Stanley family) was told that she was unable to care for her son. Julia was eventually forced to hand the care of Lennon over to Mimi and George, who had no children of their own. Lennon then lived continuously at Mendips in the smallest bedroom, which was located above the front door. Lennon later talked about Mendips and the area around it: "I lived in the suburbs in a nice semi-detached place with a small garden and doctors and lawyers and that ilk living around... not the poor slummy kind of image that was projected in all The Beatles' stories".

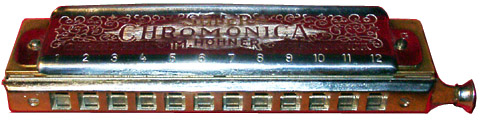
Hohner Super Chromonica, a typical 12-hole chromatic harmonica, sometimes called a mouth organ, which Smith gave to Lennon

Smith was very fond of Lennon, and his softer approach to parenting was in stark contrast to his stern wife, who based everything on decorum, honesty and a black-and-white attitude; either you were good enough or you were not. Pete Shotton—Lennon's school friend—later commented that "Mimi had a very strong sense of what was right or wrong". In contrast, Smith used to give the young Lennon "squeakers" (kisses) that his wife did not approve of.

Smith taught the four-year-old Lennon to read by reading aloud the headlines of the Liverpool Echo, read him nursery rhymes at night, and later taught Lennon how to solve crossword puzzles. Smith told Lennon that words did not have to be taken at face value, as they had many different meanings, something Lennon would later use in his writing. He also taught Lennon to draw and paint and bought him his first mouth organ. Mimi admitted that she never had the time to "go playing ducks in the bath with him" (Lennon) but that Smith would put Lennon to bed nearly every night. Mimi later said: "John [Lennon] loved his uncle George. I felt quite left out of that. They'd go off together, just leaving me a bar of chocolate and a note saying: 'Have a happy day.'"

Though he worked at night and early in the morning on the farm and his milkround, Smith often took Lennon and his cousins to the cinema or the park. When the cousins played outside Smith allowed them to eat meals with their hands in the garden shed. During the school holidays Lennon and his cousins were allowed to accompany Smith on his milk rounds, and every year he allowed Lennon to place a bet on the Grand National.

== Death ==
Smith collapsed and died on a Sunday in 1955 at home of a liver haemorrhage (aged 52) and was buried in the graveyard of St. Peter's Church, Woolton, in the Smith family grave.

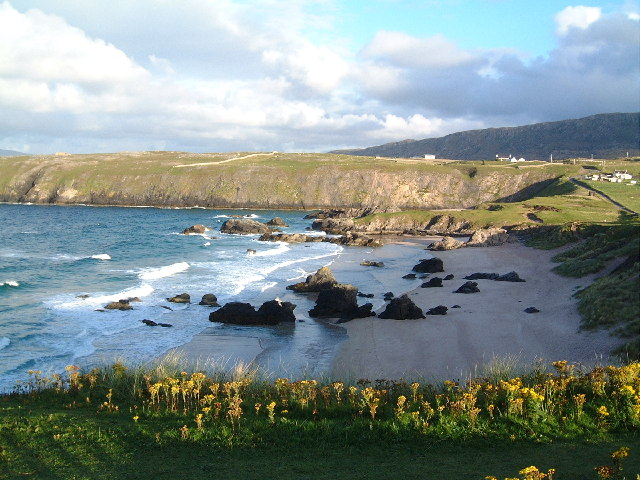
Sango Bay, Durness, which Lennon was visiting at the time of Smith's death

At the time of Smith's death, the fourteen-year-old Lennon was visiting members of the Stanley family in Sango Bay, Durness, Scotland, and was not informed until he returned home. Lennon's first reaction was to laugh hysterically, but then to privately grieve and cry. He would do the same after hearing about the death of his mother three years later, and the death of Stuart Sutcliffe (The Beatles' first bass player), which, along with Smith's death, were all major factors in Lennon's early life. In the same year as Smith's death, the McCartney family moved to 20 Forthlin Road, just three-quarters of a mile (1.2 km) from Mendips. Lennon would later meet Paul McCartney for the first time at St. Peter's Church, where Smith was buried.

After Smith's death, Lennon insisted on wearing a large overcoat that had belonged to Smith, and even though it became worn and threadbare, Lennon wore it throughout his art college years. Mimi never used the downstairs sitting room again after Smith's death, using only the breakfast room and the kitchen, and never replaced the furniture, which became old and faded. Lennon continued to live at Mendips (and also for a time with his first wife Cynthia Lennon) until his early 20s, before moving to London.

When Lennon was living in the United States, he asked his half-sister, Julia Dykins, to send the clock that was previously in the living room at Mendips, which had been passed down through Smith's family, and was inscribed with the words "George Smith, Woolton Tavern", on a metal plate on the back. In Lennon's last published interview, he said: "This image of me being an orphan is garbage, because I was well protected by my auntie and uncle [Smith and Mimi] and they looked after me very well, thanks".

== Portrayal on film ==
Smith, his wife, and Lennon were portrayed by David Threlfall, Kristin Scott Thomas, and Aaron Johnson in the film Nowhere Boy, which was released in the US on 8 October 2010.

== Sources ==
- Coleman, Ray (1987). Lennon. Mcgraw-Hill. ISBN 978-0-07-011786-0.
- Lennon, Cynthia (2005). John. Hodder & Stoughton. ISBN 978-0-340-89512-2.
- Miles, Barry (1997). Many Years From Now. Vintage-Random House. ISBN 978-0-7493-8658-0.
- Spitz, Bob (2005). The Beatles – The Biography. Little, Brown and Company. ISBN 978-0-316-80352-6.
