= Julia Lennon =

Mother of English musician John Lennon (1914–1958)

- Lennon in 1949
- Born: Julia Stanley; 12 March 1914; Toxteth, Liverpool, England
- Died: 15 July 1958 (aged 44); Woolton, Liverpool, England
- Occupations: Waitress; housewife
- Spouse: Alfred Lennon (m. 1938)
- Partner: John "Bobby" Dykins (1945–1958)
- Children: 4, including John Lennon and Julia Baird
- Relatives: Mimi Smith (sister); Julian Lennon (grandson); Sean Lennon (grandson)

Julia Lennon (née Stanley; 12 March 1914 – 15 July 1958) was the mother of English musician John Lennon, who was born during her marriage to Alfred Lennon. After complaints to Liverpool's Social Services by her eldest sister Mimi Smith (née Stanley), she surrendered the care of her son to Mimi. She later had one daughter after an affair with a Welsh soldier, but pressure from her family made her place the baby for adoption. Later she had two daughters, Julia and Jackie, with John "Bobby" Dykins. She never divorced her husband, preferring to live as Dykins' common-law wife for the rest of her life.

She was known as being high-spirited, impulsive, and musical, and for having a strong sense of humour. She taught her son John how to play the banjo and the ukulele. She kept in almost daily contact with him, and when he was in his teens he often stayed overnight at her and Dykins' house. On 15 July 1958, she was knocked down and killed by a car driven by an off-duty policeman, close to her sister's house at 251 Menlove Avenue. John was traumatised by her death and wrote several songs about her, including "Julia," "Mother," and "My Mummy's Dead." Biographer Ian MacDonald wrote that she was, "to a great extent ... her son's muse".

== Background ==
Julia Stanley, later known by her family as Judy, was born at 8 Head Street, Toxteth, South Liverpool in 1914, and was the fourth of five sisters. Her mother, Annie Jane (née Millward), gave birth to a boy and then a girl, both of whom died shortly after birth. She then had Mary, known as "Mimi" (1906–1991), Elizabeth "Mater" (1908–1976), Anne "Nanny" (1911–1988), Julia "Judy" (1914–1958), and Harriet "Harrie" (1916–1972). John Lennon would later comment that the Stanley girls were "five, fantastic, strong, beautiful, and intelligent women". Their father, George Ernest Stanley, retired from the Merchant Navy and found a job with the Liverpool & Glasgow Salvage Association as an insurance investigator. He moved his family to the suburb of Wavertree, where they lived in a small terraced house at 9 Newcastle Road near to Penny Lane. Julia's mother died in 1945, and Julia and her oldest sister Mimi had to take care of their father.

== Marriage to Alf Lennon ==
Alfred Lennon—always called "Alf" by his family—was always joking but never held a job for very long, preferring to visit Liverpool's many vaudeville theatres and cinemas, where he knew the usherettes by name. At the Trocadero club, a converted cinema on Camden Street, Liverpool, he first saw an "auburn-haired girl with a bright smile and high cheekbones": Julia Stanley. He saw her again in Sefton Park, where he had gone with a friend to meet girls. Lennon, who was dressed in a bowler hat and with a cigarette holder in hand, saw "this little waif" sitting on a wrought-iron bench. Julia, age 14, said that his hat looked "silly", to which 15-year-old Alf replied that she looked "lovely", and sat down next to her. She asked him to take off his hat, so he promptly threw it straight into the Sefton Park lake.

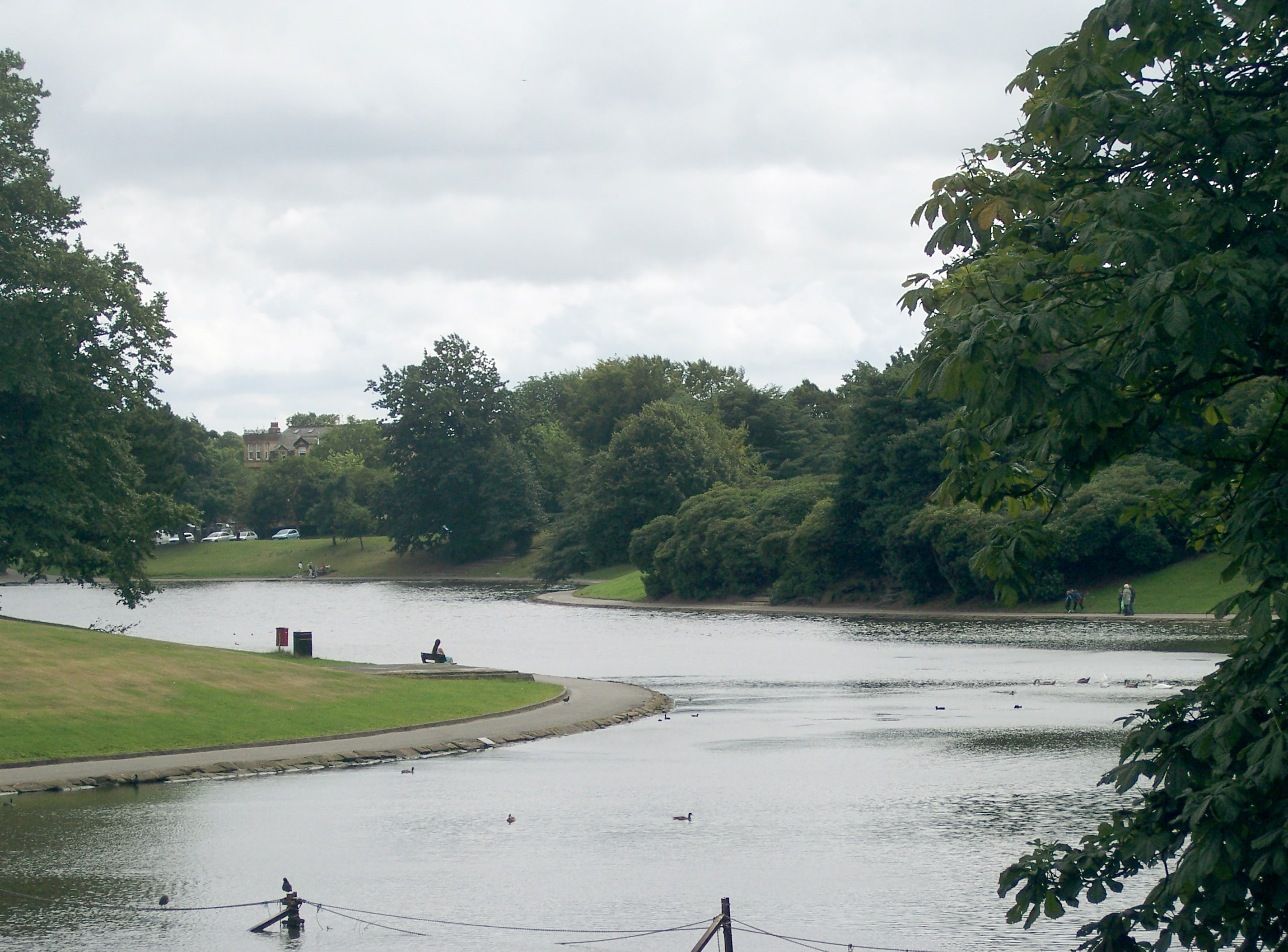
Sefton Park, where Julia Stanley first met Alf Lennon

She stood at five feet two inches (157 cm) in heels and often caught the gaze of men in the street. She was always well-dressed and even went to bed with make-up on to "look beautiful when she woke up". A nephew later said that she could "make a joke out of nothing", and could have "walked out of a burning house with a smile and a joke". She frequented Liverpool's dance halls and clubs, where she was often asked to dance in jitterbug competitions with dockers, soldiers, sailors, and waiters. It was remarked that she could be as humorous as any man and would sing the popular songs of the day at any time of day or night. Her voice sounded similar to Vera Lynn's, whilst Lennon specialised in impersonating Louis Armstrong and Al Jolson. She played the ukulele, the piano accordion, and the banjo (as did Lennon), although neither pursued music professionally. They spent their days together walking around Liverpool and talking of what they would do in the future: opening a shop, a pub, a café, or a club.

On 3 December 1938, 11 years after they first met, she married Alf Lennon after proposing to him. They were married in the Bolton Street registry office with none of her family present because she had not told them of the wedding. She wrote 'cinema usherette' as her occupation on the marriage certificate, although she had never been one. She walked into 9 Newcastle Road waving the marriage licence and said to her family, "There!—I've married him." It was an act of defiance against her father, who had threatened to disown her if she ever cohabitated with a lover. On their wedding night, she stayed at her parents' house and Lennon went back to his boarding house. The next day, he went back to sea for three months, on a ship bound for the West Indies.

The Stanley family completely ignored her husband at first, believing him to be of "no use to anyone—certainly not our Julia". Her father demanded that he present something concrete to show that he could financially support his daughter, but Alf signed on as a Merchant Navy steward on a ship bound for the Mediterranean. He returned after a few months at sea and moved into the Stanley home. He auditioned for local theatre managers as an entertainer but had no success. Julia found out that she was pregnant (with John) in January 1940, but as the war had started her husband continued to serve as a merchant seaman during World War II, sending money home regularly. The payments stopped after Alf deserted in 1943.

=== John ===
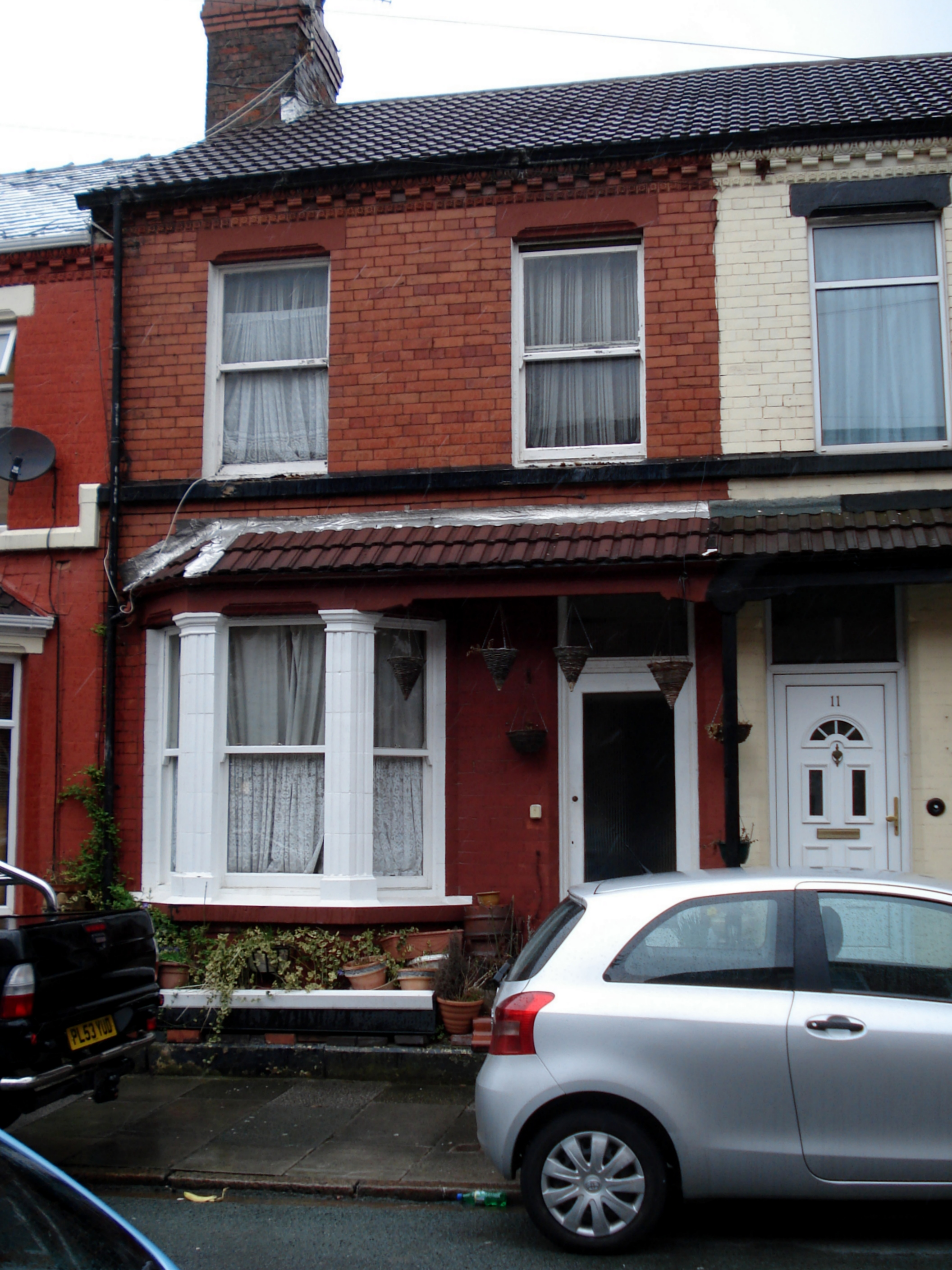
9 Newcastle Road, Liverpool; the former home of the Stanley family

Lennon gave birth to John Winston Lennon on 9 October 1940 in the second-floor ward of the Oxford Street Maternity Hospital in Liverpool, during the Second World War. Her eldest sister, Mimi Smith, phoned the hospital and was told that she had given birth to a boy. Smith would later claim that she went straight to the hospital during the middle of an air raid and was forced to hide in doorways to avoid the shrapnel from falling bombs, but in actuality, there was no attack on Liverpool that night. Alf was not present at their son's birth, as he was at sea.

John started at his first school in November 1945—Mosspits, on Mosspits Lane, Wavertree—so she found a part-time job at a café near the school. After numerous criticisms from the Stanley family about their (still-married) daughter "living in sin" with John Dykins, and considerable pressure from Smith–who twice contacted Liverpool's Social Services to complain about the infant John sleeping in the same bed as Julia and Dykins—she reluctantly handed the care of John over to Smith and her husband, George Smith. In July 1946, Alf visited the Smith house, Mendips, at 251 Menlove Avenue, and took John to Blackpool for a long holiday, but he was secretly intending to emigrate to New Zealand with him. Julia and Dykins found out and followed them to Blackpool. Alf asked Julia to go with them both to New Zealand, but she refused. After a heated argument, Alf said their five-year-old child had to choose between his mother or him. He chose Alf twice, so Julia walked away, but in the end her son, crying, followed her, although this story has been disputed. According to author Mark Lewisohn, Alf and Julia agreed that she should take John and give him a home as Alf left again. A witness who was there that day, Billy Hall, said the dramatic scene often portrayed with a young John Lennon having to make a decision between his parents never happened. Alf lost contact with the family until Beatlemania, when he and his son met again.

She took John back to her house and enrolled him in a local school, but after a few weeks she handed him back to Smith. Various reasons have been suggested for her decision, such as Dykins' unwillingness to raise the young boy, Julia's inability to cope with the responsibility, or a punishment forced on her by Smith and her father for living with a lover. John blamed himself, saying later, "My mother ... couldn't cope with me." He then lived continuously at Mendips, in the smallest bedroom above the front door, with Mimi determined to give him a "proper upbringing". Julia later bought John his first guitar for five pounds ten shillings after he had pestered her incessantly for weeks, but insisted it had to be delivered to her house, not her sister's. As John had difficulty learning chords, she taught him banjo and ukulele chords, which were simpler, and later taught John how to play the piano accordion. Julia's banjo was the first instrument that John learned to play 'sitting there with endless patience until I managed to work out all the chords.' After Julia's untimely death, the instrument was never seen again and its whereabouts remains a mystery.

As Smith refused to have a record player in her house, John learned how to play his favourite songs by going to Julia's house. She played him Elvis Presley records and would dance around her kitchen with him. In 1957, when The Quarrymen played at St. Barnabas Hall, Penny Lane, Julia turned up to watch. After each song she would clap and whistle louder than everyone else and was seen "swaying and dancing" throughout the whole concert. John frequently visited her house during that period, detailing his anxieties and problems, where she gave him encouragement to continue with music over Smith's objections.

=== Victoria ===
During 1942–1943, Lennon lived with her son at The Dairy Cottage, 120a Allerton Road, Woolton. The cottage was owned by George Smith, and Mimi wanted Lennon to live there because they would be closer to her house and also out of the Stanley house.

As Alf was often away at sea, Julia started going out to dance halls. In 1942, she met a Welsh soldier named 'Taffy' Williams, who was stationed in the barracks at Mossley Hill. Alf later blamed himself for this, as he had written letters telling her that because there was a war on, she should go out and enjoy herself. After an evening out, she would often give her young son a piece of chocolate or shortcrust pastry the next morning for breakfast. She became pregnant by Williams in late 1944, though first claiming that she had been raped by an unknown soldier. Williams refused to live with Julia—who was still married to Alf—until she gave up John, which she refused to do. When Alf eventually came home in 1944, he offered to look after his wife, their son, and the expected baby, but she rejected the idea.

Alf took John to his brother Sydney's house in the Liverpool suburb of Maghull a few months before Julia gave birth. Julia's daughter, Victoria Elizabeth, born in the Elmswood Nursing Home on 19 June 1945, was subsequently given up for adoption to a Norwegian Salvation Army captain and his wife (Peder and Margaret Pedersen) after intense pressure from the Stanley family. John Lennon was informed by his aunt Harriet Birch of her existence in 1964. John was so overcome by emotion, wanting to find his sister, that he placed an ad in the paper, and hired detectives to look for her. They searched Norway for Victoria, and came up empty-handed, and in 1980, John died never having found or met her. Her adoptive name is Ingrid Pedersen.

=== John 'Bobby' Albert Dykins ===
Lennon started seeing Dykins a year after Victoria's birth (although they had known each other before) when she was working in the café near John's primary school, Mosspits. Dykins was a good-looking, well-dressed man who worked at the Adelphi Hotel in Liverpool as a wine steward. She later moved into a small flat in Gateacre with Dykins. He enjoyed luxuries, and had access to rationed goods like alcohol, chocolate, silk stockings and cigarettes, which was what initially attracted her. The Stanley sisters called him "Spiv", because of his pencil-thin moustache, margarine-coated hair, and pork-pie hat, and John called him "Twitchy" because of a physical tic/nervous cough. Julia's family and friends remembered that he also had a fiery temperament, which could result in his being violent when drunk. John remembered seeing his mother during a visit to Smith's, when her face was bleeding after being hit by Dykins.

Paul McCartney later stated that Julia living with Dykins while she was still married was a point of social ostracization for John, as it was often used as a "cheap shot" against him. Although Julia never divorced Alf, she was considered to be the common-law wife of Dykins. She wanted John to live with them both, but he was passed between the Stanley sisters and often ran away to Mimi's, where she would open the door to find John standing there, "his face covered in tears". Julia was accused by the family of being frivolous and unreliable—she never enjoyed household chores—and was once seen sweeping the kitchen floor with a pair of knickers on her head. Her cooking methods were also haphazard, as she would mix things "like a mad scientist", and even put tea "or anything else that came to hand" in a stew. A favourite joke would be to wear a pair of spectacles that had no glass in them, and then to scratch her eye through the empty frame.

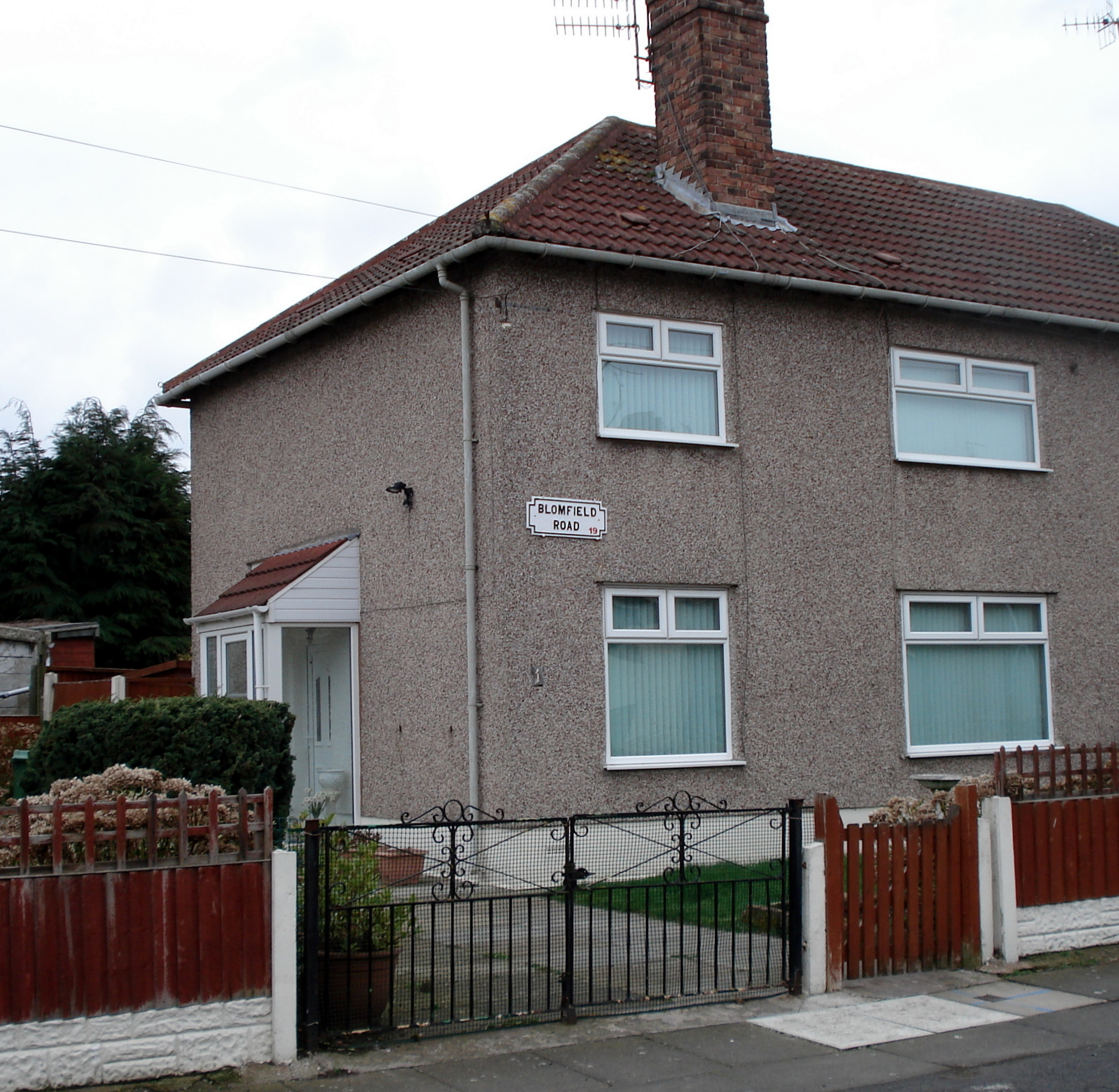
1 Blomfield Road, Liverpool, where Julia and Dykins lived

Dykins later managed several bars in Liverpool, which allowed Lennon to stay at home and look after their two daughters (Julia and Jackie) and John, who often visited and stayed overnight, at 1 Blomfield Road, Liverpool. John and McCartney would rehearse in the bathroom of the house where the acoustics "sounded like a recording studio". Dykins used to give John weekly pocket money (one shilling) for doing odd jobs, on top of the five shillings that Smith gave him. In December 1965, Dykins was killed in a car crash at the bottom of Penny Lane, but John was not told about his death for months afterwards, as it was "not [Stanley] family business".

=== Julia and Jackie ===
Julia had two daughters with Dykins: Julia (later Julia Baird, born 5 March 1947) and Jacqueline ("Jackie", born 26 October 1949). As Jackie was born prematurely, her mother visited the hospital every day to see her. When Lennon was 11 years old, he started to visit the Dykins' house, and often stayed overnight. Young Julia would give up her bed to him and share her sister's bed. Baird remembered that after Lennon had visited them, their mother would often play a record called "My Son John, To Me You Are So Wonderful," "by some old crooner, and sit and listen to it". (Baird probably meant "My Son John"—sung by David Whitfield—which was released in 1956.) After Julia's death, the two girls (aged eleven and eight) were sent to stay in Edinburgh at Aunt Mater's (Elizabeth) and were only told two months later, by their uncle Norman Birch, that their mother had died. The commercial success of the Beatles allowed John to buy a four-bedroom house in Gateacre Park Drive, Liverpool, for Julia and Jackie to live in with the Birches. They had previously been made legal guardians of the two girls; Dykins' parentage had been disregarded as he had never married Julia. After John's death, his widow, Yoko Ono, became the owner of the house and sought to sell it, later giving it to the Salvation Army on 2 November 1993, even though John had once written a letter, stating: "I always thought of the house he's in [Birch] as my contribution towards looking after Julia [Baird] and Jackie. I would prefer the girls to use it."

Julia and Jackie later met their half-sister, Ingrid Pedersen, when they were present at the ceremony to place a Blue Heritage plaque on Smith's house to commemorate that John had lived there. Their cousin Stanley Parkes was on the ladder fixing the plaque to the wall and said, "I think I can see Ingrid" [walking towards the house]. Baird and her sister were surprised, as it meant that Parkes had seen Pedersen before, even though Baird and Jackie never had. When all three finally met for the first time, Baird was shocked that Ingrid did not look anything like the Stanley family, as she had "pale blue eyes and fair hair".

== Death ==
Julia visited Mimi nearly every day, where they would chat over tea and cakes in the morning room or stand in the garden when it was warm. On the evening of 15 July 1958, Nigel Walley went to visit John and found Julia and Mimi talking by the front gate. John was not there, as he was at the Blomfield Road house. Walley accompanied Julia to the bus stop further north along Menlove Avenue with her, telling jokes along the way. At about 9:30, Walley left her to walk up Vale Road and she crossed Menlove Avenue to the central reservation between two traffic lines, which was lined with hedges that covered disused tram tracks. Moments later, Walley heard "a loud thud" and turned to see Julia's body "flying through the air" and landing 100 feet (30 m) away. He ran back to get Mimi, and together they waited for the ambulance to arrive.

Julia was struck and killed by a Standard Vanguard car driven by Eric Clague, an off-duty policeman still in the process of obtaining a regular driver's license. Clague was cleared of all charges and received a short suspension from his duties. Upon hearing the verdict, Mimi was furious and branded Clague a "murderer". Clague never extended condolences to Julia's family, believing that it would exacerbate the situation. He later left the police force and became a postman.

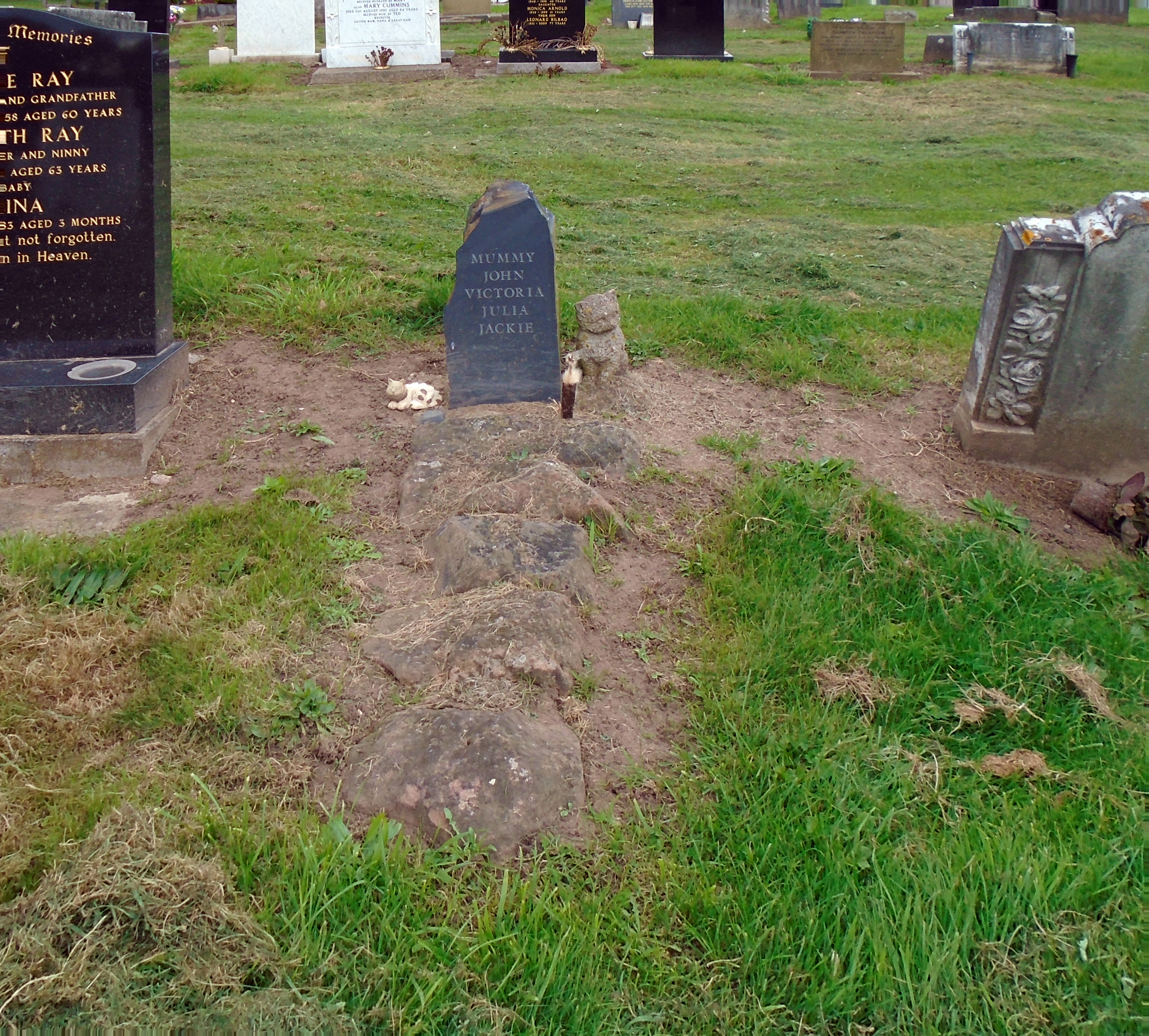
Julia Lennon's grave in Allerton Cemetery

John, devastated by the loss of his mother, was unable to bear the sight of her body at the hospital and rested his head on Mimi's lap throughout the funeral service. He avoided talking to Walley for months afterwards, leading Walley to believe that John held him accountable for the tragedy. Julia was buried in Allerton Cemetery in Liverpool. Her grave, initially unmarked, was later identified as "CE (Church of England) 38-805". A headstone was subsequently placed on Julia's grave, with the words "Mummy, John, Victoria, Julia, Jackie" inscribed.

== Effect on John ==
Julia's death traumatised John and, for the next two years, he drank heavily and frequently got into fights, consumed by a "blind rage". It contributed to the emotional difficulties that haunted him for much of his life, but also served to draw him closer to McCartney, who had also lost his mother at an early age. Her memory inspired songs such as the 1968 Beatles song "Julia", with its dreamlike imagery of "hair of floating sky glimmering", recalling John's boyhood memories of his mother. He remarked that the song "was sort of a combination of Yoko [Ono] and my mother blended into one". "Mother" and "My Mummy's Dead" were both written under the influence of Arthur Janov's "Primal Scream" therapy, and released on his solo album John Lennon/Plastic Ono Band in 1970. John's first son, Julian, was named after her.

When he inducted John Lennon into the Rock and Roll Hall of Fame as a solo artist, Paul McCartney described Julia in his speech as a very beautiful woman with long red hair who played the ukulele. He commented that he had to teach John the guitar chords since John would just play the ukulele chords that his mother had taught him on guitar.

== Portrayals on film ==
She was portrayed by Christine Kavanagh in In His Life: The John Lennon Story (2000), and by Anne-Marie Duff in Nowhere Boy (2009).
