= Nowhere Boy =

2009 film by Sam Taylor-Johnson

- British release poster
- Directed by: Sam Taylor-Johnson
- Screenplay by: Matt Greenhalgh
- Based on: Imagine This: Growing Up with My Brother John Lennon by Julia Baird
- Produced by: Robert Bernstein; Douglas Rae
- Starring: Aaron Taylor-Johnson; Anne-Marie Duff; Kristin Scott Thomas; David Threlfall; Thomas Brodie-Sangster; David Morrissey
- Cinematography: Seamus McGarvey
- Edited by: Lisa Gunning
- Music by: Goldfrapp
- Production companies: Icon Entertainment International; Film4; UK Film Council; Ecosse Films; HanWay Films
- Distributed by: Icon Film Distribution
- Release dates: 29 October 2009 (London); 26 December 2009 (United Kingdom)
- Running time: 97 minutes
- Country: United Kingdom
- Language: English
- Budget: £1.2 million
- Box office: $6.6 million

Nowhere Boy is a 2009 British biographical drama film, directed by Sam Taylor-Johnson in her directorial debut. Written by Matt Greenhalgh, it is based on Julia Baird's biography of her half-brother, the musician John Lennon. Nowhere Boy is about the teenage years of Lennon (Aaron Taylor-Johnson), his relationships with his aunt Mimi Smith (Kristin Scott Thomas) and his mother Julia Lennon (Anne-Marie Duff), the creation of his first band, the Quarrymen, and its evolution into the Beatles.

Following its premiere at the London Film Festival on 29 October 2009, Nowhere Boy opened in British cinemas on 26 December 2009. Nearly a year later, in October 2010, the film received its US release, coinciding with the 70th anniversary of Lennon's birth. Nowhere Boy received positive reviews from critics and was a moderate hit at the box office, earning £4.3 million on a £1.2 million budget.

== Plot ==
The drama tells the story of John Lennon's teenage years from 1955 to 1960. John was separated from his mother, Julia Lennon, when he was five. His aunt and uncle, Mimi and George Smith, raised him like a son. John is close to his Uncle George, who dies suddenly when John is 14. John becomes curious about his mother, who has since had three daughters, one of whom was placed for adoption. He becomes obsessed with rock and roll music during a visit to Blackpool with Julia. When John is suspended from school, Julia allows him to stay at her house during the day to keep Mimi from finding out. Julia teaches John how to play the banjo. Mimi discovers their arrangement, but John refuses to go home with her and stays at Julia's. A week later, John overhears Julia and her common-law husband arguing about him, so he returns to Mimi's.

When John wants to start a rock 'n' roll band, Mimi buys him a guitar. John forms a band named the Quarrymen. At their first gig at a village fête, John meets Paul McCartney. Paul auditions and joins the band. Paul and John soon begin composing songs together. As the Quarrymen gain popularity, John meets Paul's friend, George Harrison, who becomes the band's lead guitarist.

At a birthday party which Julia throws for John, he confronts her about his absent father, Alf Lennon. He wants to know why Julia gave him up. He also confronts Mimi, who says Julia cheated on Alf and did not want to stay with him. Alf had asked 5-year-old John to choose whom he wanted to live with. John initially chose his father, though he then wanted to stay with his mother. Without either parent having the time or money to legally determine custody, Mimi became John's custodian. John is upset by this revelation, and leaves in a drunken anger.

John moves out to live on his own. Over time, he, Julia, and Mimi become friendly. When Julia is fatally hit by a car, John is consumed by anger, and physically assaults Paul and fellow bandmate Pete during Julia's wake, though the two soon forgive him. Two years later, he goes to travel to Hamburg with his newly formed band, the Beatles. Mimi asks John to call her as soon as he arrives. The film ends with the caption, "John phoned Mimi as soon as he arrived in Hamburg...and every week thereafter for the rest of his life".

== Cast ==
- Aaron Taylor-Johnson as John Lennon
  - Alex Ambrose as young John Lennon
- Anne-Marie Duff as Julia Lennon
- Kristin Scott Thomas as Mimi Smith
- Thomas Brodie-Sangster as Paul McCartney
- Sam Bell as George Harrison
- David Threlfall as George Toogood Smith
- David Morrissey as Bobby Dykins
- Angelica Jopling as Julia Baird
- Abby Greenhalgh as Jacqueline "Jackie" Dykins
- Josh Bolt as Pete Shotton
- Frazer Bird as Len Garry
- James Jack Bentham as Rod Davis
- Jack McElhone as Eric Griffiths
- Sam Wilmott as Colin Hanton
- Daniel Ross as Nigel Walley
- John Collins as Ivan Vaughan
- Andrew Buchan as Michael Fishwick
- Paul Ritter as Popjoy
- Ophelia Lovibond as Marie Kennedy
- James Johnson as Stan Parkes
- Christian Bird as Jimmy Tarbuck
- Colin Tierney as Alfred Lennon
- Dan Armour as Percy Phillips

== Production ==
The film was the directorial debut of conceptual artist/photographer Sam Taylor-Johnson. The screenplay was written by Matt Greenhalgh, who also wrote the Joy Division film Control.

Casting for the film began in September 2008.

Principal photography began in March 2009. It was shot on location in Liverpool, the last house on the right at the end of Sussex Road in Ickenham, Middlesex and at Ealing Studios in West London. Some of the interior school scenes were filmed at Sacred Heart Catholic College in Crosby. Following the announcement of the film, initial media accounts indicated that it would be based on the book Imagine This: Growing Up with My Brother John Lennon by Lennon's half sister Julia Baird. However, the credits for the completed film do not reference either the book or Baird, with sole writing credit accorded to screenwriter Matt Greenhalgh. The director consulted both Paul McCartney and Yoko Ono about the script, with both firmly correcting the depiction of Mimi to be less strict and more loving of John.

Lead actor Aaron Taylor-Johnson was in the middle of filming Kick-Ass in autumn 2008 while he was preparing to audition for the role. He stated in an interview: "I remember [during] my lunch breaks when I was filming ‘Kick-Ass’ that I could quickly look up on YouTube footage of Lennon and look through the scenes that I could do at the casting, and I had a day off where I could do the casting, and it was insane."

Before landing on Johnson, Taylor-Johnson wanted singer Miles Kane to play the lead, after seeing him in an interview with bandmate Alex Turner, and being struck by their Beatlesque appearance. Taylor-Johnson went backstage to a Last Shadow Puppets show and brought Kane the script, with him ultimately passing on the role.

The film received a National Lottery funding of £1.2 million from the UK Film Council Premier Fund, with an additional £35,500 from its Development Fund to create the script. The film also received a grant from Film4 (the film division of Channel 4).

== Release ==
The film premiered in the UK on 26 December 2009. Its US release was on 8 October 2010, coinciding with that weekend's celebrations of the 70th anniversary of Lennon's birth.

HanWay Films represented worldwide sales. Distributor Icon Entertainment International took the rights for the United Kingdom and Australia. Mars Distribution acquired the rights for France. The Weinstein Company distributed the film in the United States, Germany and Latin America.

=== Festival screenings ===
The film had its world premiere on 29 October 2009 at the closing night of the London Film Festival. The film was screened at the 2010 Sundance Film Festival on 27 January. It screened again at the Maui Film Festival in Wailea, Hawaii, on 18 June 2010, the Traverse City Film Festival in Traverse City, Michigan on 27 July 2010, and at The Fest For Beatles Fans convention in Chicago on 14 August 2010.

== Reception ==
=== Critical reception ===
The film has received mostly positive reviews from film critics. Based on 145 reviews, it holds an 81% rating on review aggregation site Rotten Tomatoes. The site's critical consensus of the film is: "Don't expect any musical insights, but this look at John Lennon's early life benefits from its restrained, low-key approach and some fine acting from Aaron Johnson." In The New York Times, reviewer Manohla Dargis concluded, "It's a pleasant-enough creation story to revisit, one weighted down by melodrama and lifted up by some rocking tunes."

In his 2013 book Tune In, Beatles historian Mark Lewisohn criticised the historical accuracy of the scene in which Lennon is forced to choose between Alfred and Julia, writing "John's 'choice' was not between his mother and father, it was between his mostly absent dad's friend's parents—in whose lives he had no place—and home and school back in Liverpool. There was no choice at all."

=== Awards ===
Nowhere Boy was nominated for four British Academy Film Awards: Outstanding British Film, Best Supporting Actress (one each for Anne-Marie Duff and Kristin Scott Thomas), and Outstanding Debut by a British director (Sam Taylor-Johnson). The film also won the Audience Choice Award for Best Feature at the San Diego Film Festival in 2010.

== Soundtrack ==
The soundtrack was released digitally on 11 December 2009 and in stores as a two-disc album by Sony Music Entertainment on 29 December 2009. Disc 1 contains songs featured in the film, and Disc 2 is made up of rock and roll classics that inspired the film and Lennon himself.
