= St Peter's Church, Woolton, Liverpool =

Coordinates: 53.3760°N 2.8694°W

St Peter's Church, Woolton
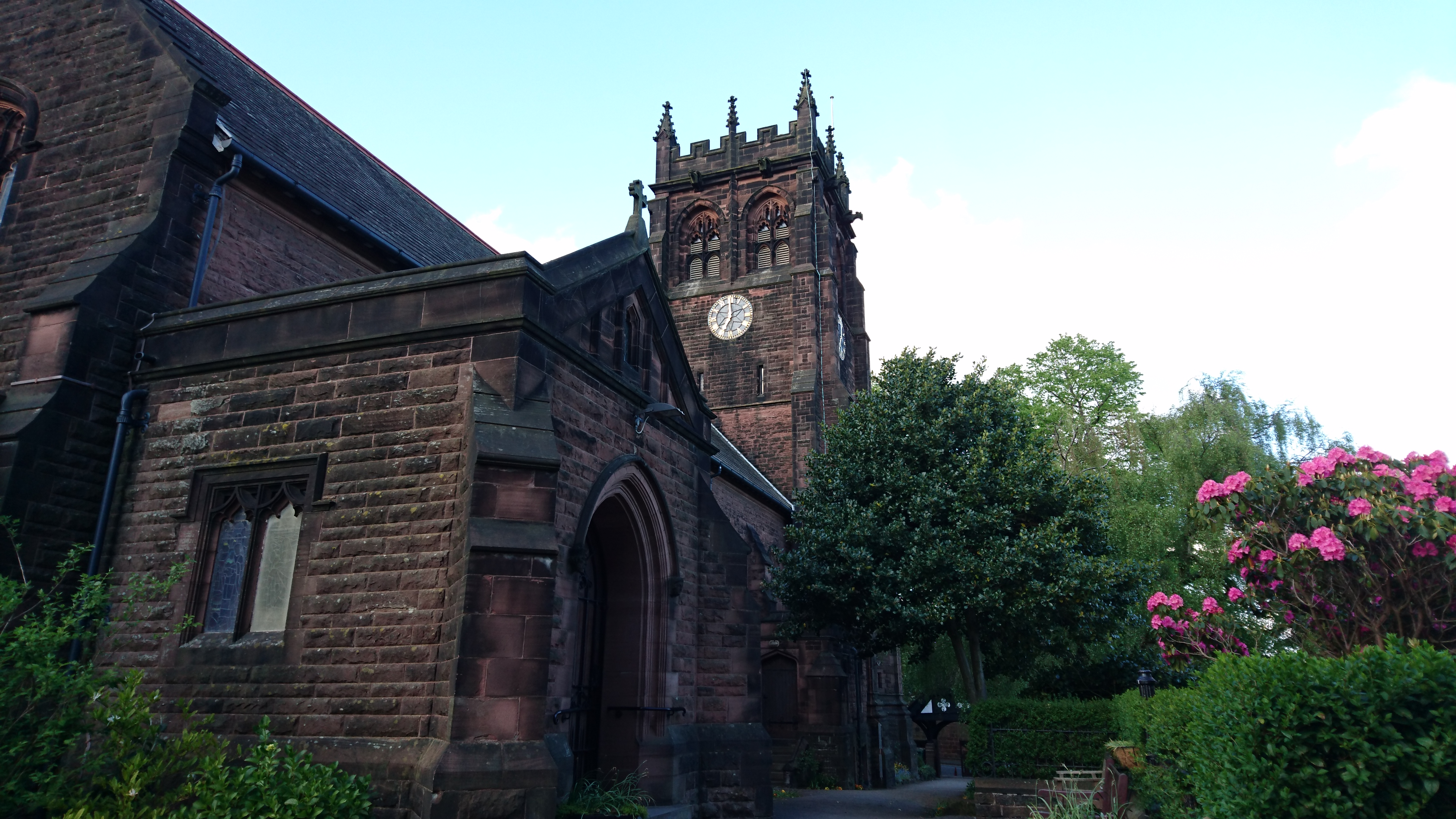
- St Peter's Church, Woolton, from its yard

- Location in Merseyside
- OS grid reference: SJ 423 869
- Location: Church Road, Woolton, Liverpool, Merseyside
- Country: England
- Denomination: Church of England
- Website: St Peter's, Woolton

History
- Status: Parish church

Architecture
- Functional status: Active
- Heritage designation: Grade II*
- Designated: 14 March 1975
- Architect: Grayson and Ould
- Architectural type: Church
- Style: Gothic Revival (Perpendicular)
- Groundbreaking: 1886
- Completed: 1887

Specifications
- Materials: Sandstone

Administration
- Province: York
- Diocese: Liverpool
- Archdeaconry: Liverpool
- Deanery: Liverpool South Childwall
- Parish: Much Woolton

Clergy
- Rector: Rev Lizzy Holland MA

St Peter's Church is in Church Road, Woolton, Liverpool, Merseyside, England. It is an active Anglican parish church in the deanery of Liverpool South Childwall, the archdeaconry of Liverpool, and the diocese of Liverpool. The church is recorded in the National Heritage List for England as a designated Grade II* listed building. It is one of the largest parish churches in Liverpool, and its bell tower was the highest point of the city. The church also has connections with The Beatles, being the location where founding members Paul McCartney and John Lennon first met.

== History ==
In 1826 a chapel was built near the side of the present church. It was built in sandstone and could hold about 200 people. The chapel was in Neoclassical style. The population of Woolton continued to grow, and the style of the church was disliked by the congregation. A number of wealthy merchants were living in the area, and it was decided to build a new church. The foundation stone for this was laid in 1886. The new church was designed by the local architects Grayson and Ould, and was completed in 1887. An extension was added to the west of the church in 1989, which includes an eight-sided hall.

== Architecture ==
=== Exterior ===
St Peter's is constructed in red sandstone. It is a large church in Perpendicular style. The church provides seating for nearly 500 people. Its plan consists of a nave, north and south four-bay aisles under separate gables, a south porch, a north transept, a chancel, a three-bay north chapel, a south vestry, and a southwest tower. The tower is 90 feet (27 m) high. It has angle buttresses, a canted turret in the southeast angle, paired two-light bell openings, a cornice. gargoyles, an embattled parapet, and pinnacles. The windows along the sides of the aisles have three lights, and the west window has five lights. There are four-light windows in the transept and the chapel, and a seven-light east window.

=== Interior ===
Inside the church are five-bay arcades carried on quatrefoil columns. The nave has a hammerbeam roof, and in the chapel is a canted, stencilled ceiling. The reredos contains five niches containing paintings dating from 1905 by Sigismund Goetze. The octagonal font is in alabaster, and has a traceried cover. The pulpit is also in alabaster, and is decorated with a frieze of angels. There are wrought iron screens to the chancel and the chapel. In the chancel is a sedilia with cusped arches and pinnacles. Most of the stained glass is by C. E. Kempe, and there are two windows by Morris & Co. Also in the church is a memorial to the First World War by Heaton, Butler and Bayne. The original pipe organ was designed by Foster and Andrews in 1895. This was rebuilt by Rushworth and Dreaper in 1945, and refurbished in 1994 by David Wells. The organ has three manuals, 38 stops, and 2,338 pipes. The tower contains a ring of ten bells.

== External features ==
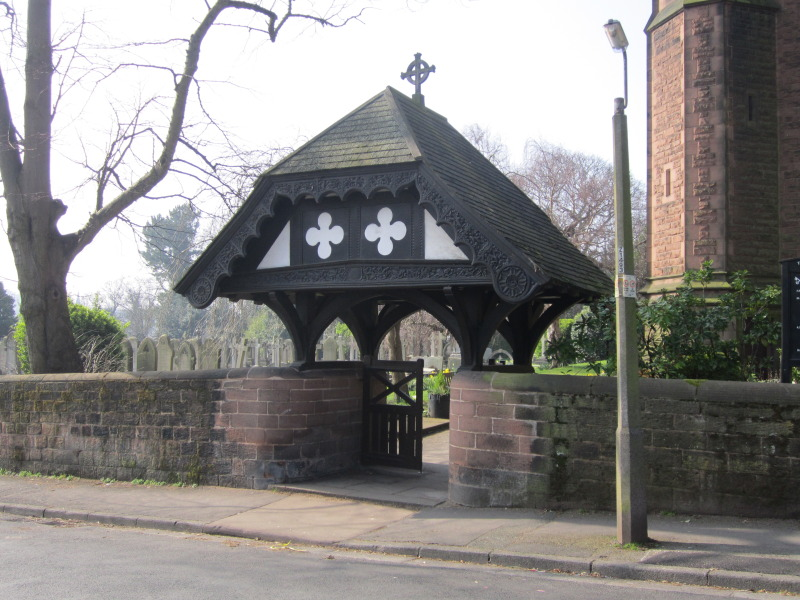
Lychgate

At the entry to the churchyard is a large, ornate lychgate, which was designed by Grayson and Ould, and is contemporary with the church. It consists of a timber canopy on a stone base. The roof is shingled, and the bressumers and bargeboards are finely carved. On top of the lychgate is a cross. It is designated by English Heritage as a Grade II listed building. In the churchyard is another memorial to the First World War. This is in Art Nouveau style and carries a Celtic cross, the word "PEACE", and the date of the completion of the war. Also in the churchyard is the grave of Bob Paisley (1919–1996), footballer and manager of Liverpool F.C.

== Connection with The Beatles ==
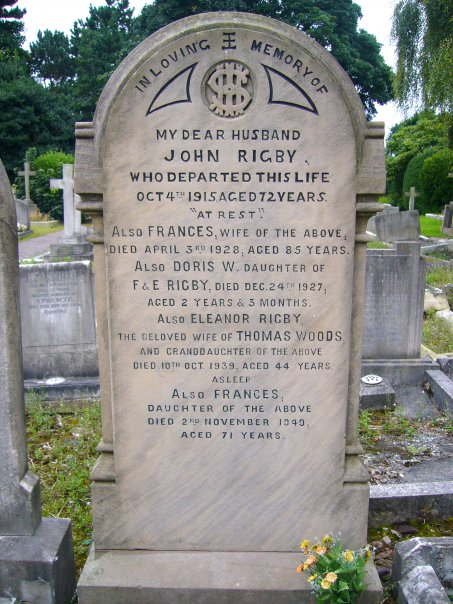
Grave stone with the name of Eleanor Rigby at St Peter's Church.

On 6 July 1957, John Lennon first met Paul McCartney in the church hall of St Peter's when Lennon was playing with his group, The Quarrymen. McCartney eventually joined the group, which later became The Beatles. In the churchyard of St Peter's is the grave of Eleanor Rigby whose name, coincidentally, is the same as that of a Beatles' song. Also in the churchyard is the grave of Lennon's uncle, George Toogood Smith, with whom he lived as a child.

== See also ==
- Grade II* listed buildings in Liverpool – Suburbs
