= Woolton =

Suburb of Liverpool, England

Coordinates: 53.374°N 2.865°W

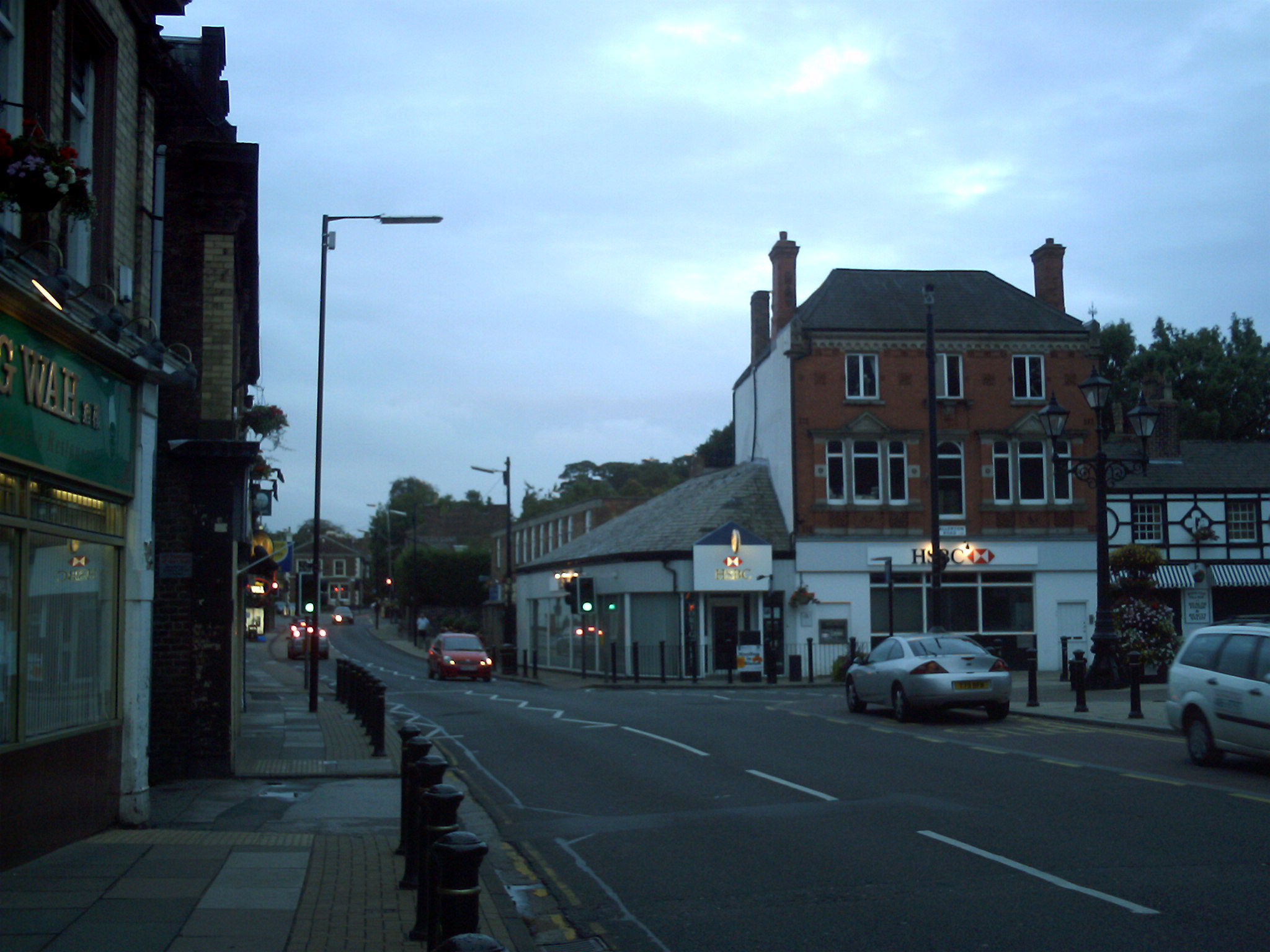
- Woolton Village in August 2006

- Location within Merseyside
- Population: 12,921 (2011 Census)
- OS grid reference: SJ425867
- Metropolitan borough: City of Liverpool
- Metropolitan county: Merseyside
- Region: North West
- Country: England
- Sovereign state: United Kingdom
- Post town: LIVERPOOL
- Postcode district: L25
- Dialling code: 0151
- Police: Merseyside
- Fire: Merseyside
- Ambulance: North West
- UK Parliament: Liverpool Garston

Woolton (locally /ˈwuːltən/; WUHL-ton) is a suburb of Liverpool, in Merseyside, England. It is an area located southeast of the city and bordered by Allerton, Gateacre, Halewood, and Hunt's Cross. At the 2011 Census, the population was 12,921.

== Overview ==
Originally a standalone village, Woolton was incorporated into Liverpool in 1913. The area was referred to as "Uluentune" in the Domesday Book, with the name translating as "farm of Wulfa". Shortly after the Domesday survey, which was completed in 1086, Woolton became part of the Barony of Halton and Widnes. In 1189, a charge was granted by John, Constable of Chester, to the order of Knights of St. John of Jerusalem, a religious order who protected the routes for Christians on a pilgrimage to the Holy Land. The Knights held land in Woolton for over 350 years, until it was confiscated from them in 1559 by Queen Elizabeth I. The manorial rights to Woolton passed from Queen Elizabeth to James I, who sold them to William Stanley, 6th Earl of Derby. Woolton then passed to Isaac Green, then his daughter, then her son Bamber Gascoyne of Childwall (MP for Liverpool 1780–1796 and an ancestor of longtime University Challenge host Bamber Gascoigne), and is now owned by the Marquess of Salisbury.

Housing is primarily detached and semi-detached, although some terraces survive in Woolton Village (the centre of the suburb). Pubs in the area include The Cobden, The Elephant, The Grapes, The Victoria, and The White Horse, with more within walking distance. Other notable buildings include the Victorian public swimming baths and the public library, which was converted from a Methodist chapel but closed in 2012 as part of Liverpool City Council's cost-cutting measures. Woolton has a number of churches, including St Mary's (Catholic), St Peter's (Anglican), and St James's (Methodist). The Catholic schools St Francis Xavier's and St Julie's are also located in Woolton.

Hunts Cross Station is the nearest railway station on the southern boundary of Woolton, with local services on the southern route of the Manchester to Liverpool line between Liverpool Lime Street and Manchester Oxford Road, and also Merseyrail's Northern Line to Liverpool Central and Southport. Liverpool South Parkway, one and a half miles to the west of Woolton, serves the same lines in addition to Crewe and Birmingham stopping services. Bus services provide connections with Liverpool John Lennon Airport, the city centre, neighbouring districts and the broader Liverpool area. Gateacre (for Woolton) also served passengers from 1879 until its closure in 1972.

All three elected councillors for the Woolton ward (Malcolm Kelly, Kris Brown, and Barbara Mace) are Liberal Democrats.

== Beatles landmarks ==
Numerous sites of interest associated with the Beatles can be found in Woolton, most notably John Lennon's childhood home at 251 Menlove Avenue and the children's care home Strawberry Field, both of which are just one street away from each other. It is also generally believed that Lennon first met Paul McCartney during a fête at St Peter's Church in Woolton on 6 July 1957. The churchyard additionally houses the graves of Eleanor Rigby and Lennon's uncle, George Toogood Smith, with whom he lived at 251 Menlove Avenue for much of his childhood.

== Notable areas ==
- Mendips (251 Menlove Avenue)
- Much Woolton Old School
- St Peter's Church
- Strawberry Field
- Woolton Hall
- Woolton Picture House
- Woolton Woods and Camphill

== Notable people ==
- Ernest Alexander, recipient of the Victoria Cross, born in Woolton
- Joe Baker, footballer, born in Woolton
- Malandra Burrows, actress and singer, born and raised in Woolton
- Jodie Comer, actress, raised in nearby Childwall and attended St Julie's in Woolton
- Philip A. Gale, scientist, raised in Woolton
- Amy Jackson, actress, raised in Woolton
- Katarina Johnson-Thompson, heptathlete, raised in Woolton and attended St Julie's
- Kenneth Kitchen, British biblical scholar, Ancient Near Eastern historian, and Personal and Brunner Professor Emeritus of Egyptology and honorary research fellow at the School of Archaeology, Classics and Egyptology, University of Liverpool, England.
- John Lennon, singer, musician, and songwriter, raised in Woolton
- Rex Makin, solicitor, lived in Woolton
- Matthew Murphy, singer, musician, and songwriter, born and raised in Woolton
- Simon O'Brien, presenter and actor, lives in Woolton
- Bob Paisley, former manager of Liverpool FC, buried in the churchyard of St Peter's
- Simon Rimmer, celebrity chef, owns the Elephant Pub & Bakehouse in Woolton
- Willy Russell, playwright, lives in Woolton
- Peter Serafinowicz, actor and comedian, raised in nearby Gateacre and attended St Francis Xavier's
- Benedictine nuns from Stanbrook Abbey lived in Woolton from 1795 to 1807
- Hannah Elizabeth, a Playboy Bunny and runner-up of the first series of Love Island

== In popular culture ==
The final two acts of Oscar Wilde's satirical 1895 play The Importance of Being Earnest are set in Woolton during the year 1894.
