= Paul McCartney: Many Years from Now =

Official biography of Paul McCartney

- Cover of the paperback edition
- Author: Barry Miles
- Language: English
- Subject: Paul McCartney; The Beatles
- Genre: Biography
- Publisher: Secker & Warburg (1997); Vintage (1998)
- Publication date: 2 October 1997 (hardcover); 24 September 1998 (paperback)
- Publication place: United Kingdom
- Pages: 680 (hardback); 654 (paperback)
- ISBN: 0-8050-5249-6
- OCLC: 40284619
- Dewey Decimal: 782.42166/092 B
- LC Class: ML410.M115 M55 1997

Paul McCartney: Many Years from Now is a 1997 biography of Paul McCartney by Barry Miles. It is the "official" biography of McCartney and was written "based on hundreds of hours of exclusive interviews undertaken over a period of five years", according to the back cover of the 1998 paperback edition. The title is a phrase from McCartney's song "When I'm Sixty-Four", from the Beatles' 1967 album Sgt. Pepper's Lonely Hearts Club Band. The book was first published in the United Kingdom in October 1997 by Secker & Warburg.

== Background and content ==
McCartney and Miles began working on the project shortly after McCartney's 1989–90 world tour. According to Miles, the "core" of the book resulted from 35 taped interviews held between 1991 and 1996.

So I'll give you it as I remember it, but I do admit, my thing does move around, jumps around a lot. But the nice thing is, we don't have to be too faithful, because that's not what we're talking about. We're talking about a sequence of things that did all happen within a period. So it's my recollection of then …

— Paul McCartney

Irked at the reverence afforded John Lennon following the latter's murder in 1980, McCartney sought to alter the perception that Lennon had been the true creative leader of the Beatles. In this way, the book was an extension of McCartney's campaign to establish his legacy, particularly with regard to the Beatles' forays into the avant-garde, and followed statements he had made on the subject in a 1986 interview with Rolling Stone magazine and in the programme for his 1989–90 world tour. The majority of Many Years from Now covers the Lennon–McCartney songwriting partnership, the rise and fall of the Beatles, and McCartney's immersion in the vibrant arts scene of 1960s London. Of the 600-plus pages, just twenty focus on his life after the Beatles' break-up in 1970.

According to author Howard Sounes, the idea to write the memoir had been Miles', yet he had "[agreed] to let Paul vet the manuscript and, perhaps surprisingly, retain 75 per cent of the royalties, meaning it was really going to be Paul's book". Their interviews coincided with McCartney reuniting with his former bandmates George Harrison and Ringo Starr to work on the Beatles Anthology project. The publication was further delayed due to his wife Linda McCartney's deteriorating condition after she was diagnosed with breast cancer in late 1995.

== Publication ==
Paul McCartney: Many Years from Now was first published in the United Kingdom on 2 October 1997 by Secker & Warburg. McCartney promoted it on 12 October during an interview with Michael Parkinson on the BBC Radio 2 show Parkinson's Sunday Supplement.

The book became a bestseller. Its popularity came at the end of a year of considerable professional success for McCartney, following his knighthood in January and the favourable response afforded his album Flaming Pie.

== Reception ==
=== Contemporary perspectives ===
Many Years from Now attracted criticism from some readers for its focus on songwriting credits and McCartney's attribution of percentages to determine the extent of his and Lennon's respective authorship of a Lennon–McCartney composition. Others objected to the apparent rewriting of history and McCartney's determination to be recognised as the Beatle who first embraced the avant-garde. In a January 1998 interview, Lennon's widow, Yoko Ono, responded to McCartney's claims, saying that while McCartney may have led the Beatles' late-career projects by "[making] the phone calls", Lennon's leadership was more inspirational and "very high level, on some kind of magical level". Ono also said that in the way that he had challenged her late husband's legacy, McCartney had placed himself in the role of the envious Antonio Salieri to Lennon's Mozart.

The book was the apotheosis of the theme that McCartney had introduced a full decade earlier: he was the original avant-garde Beatle. Here was all the evidence to prove the point, but presented in such a defensive way that it begged criticism from those who felt that he ought to let history run its course and the facts speak for themselves.

— Peter Doggett

Rob Blackhurst of The Independent saw the memoir as part of McCartney's "full-scale attempt at historical revisionism"; he identified "sanctimonious justifications and sideswipes at Lennon" throughout the text, which, he said, portrayed McCartney as "a man extremely sensitive to criticism". Blackhurst regretted that Miles "exacerbates this distasteful trait in his subject by inserting his own mindless jibes" and found the tone both contrary to the "warmth and great personal integrity" McCartney displayed when discussing family, and unnecessary, given that the former Beatle had already won a newfound respect from contemporary listeners in the 1990s.

According to author and music critic Tim Riley, the best reaction to Many Years from Now, and to McCartney's public efforts to persuade Ono to let him change the Lennon–McCartney songwriting credit for "Yesterday", came from Rolling Stone contributing editor Mim Udovitch, who wrote: "[He] makes you want to sit down and write him a letter saying, 'Dear Sir Paul: Anybody who really knows recognizes that without your superb musicianship, the Beatles could not have been. You are fully a co-genius with the late John Lennon. Now please relax.'"

Conversely, Beatles biographer Ian MacDonald welcomed the book – particularly McCartney's claim that he and Lennon had retained an element of collaboration throughout the Beatles' career – saying that it offered "a necessary corrective" to the history established by Lennon. Having obtained details from Miles before the publication of Many Years from Now, MacDonald incorporated this new perspective in the 1997 revised edition of his book Revolution in the Head. (Note: In turn, Miles lists Revolution in the Head as one of the three "key books" he used as source material for Many Years from Now, and recognises its "many valuable insights" into the Beatles' music.)

Reviewing for Amazon.com, Entertainment Weekly critic Tim Appelo wrote: "This book is even better than A Hard Day's Write: The Stories Behind Every Beatles' Song and Revolution in the Head. Here is the last word on the Beatles, inevitably slanted toward McCartney but generally more convincing than Lennon's own recollections." Writing in People magazine, Peter Ames Carlin described it as "A must-read for anyone interested in the Beatles, the '60s, for that matter, modern culture itself."

=== Retrospective assessment ===
Among more recent assessments, Rolling Stone placed the book seventh on its 2012 list of "The 25 Greatest Rock Memoirs of All Time". The magazine's editors noted the controversy caused by some of McCartney's recollections and added: "But on the page, as well as in song, his voice overflows with wit and affection. And he did less to fuck up his good luck than any rock star who ever existed, which might be why his memories make such marvelous company." In his overview of the most popular Beatles books, for Rough Guides, Chris Ingham writes: "McCartney virtually apologises before he starts – 'lest it be seen that I'm now trying to do my own kind of revisionism' – and then proceeds with 600 pages of what should have been called My Own Kind of Revisionism." Ingham concedes that the text contains "fascinating detail" but he finds the adoption of songwriting percentages "faintly embarrassing" and "desperate", and similarly bemoans McCartney's "'I was the cool one really' justifications". In a 2012 article titled "The best books on the Beatles", for The Guardian, John Harris described Many Years from Now as "a transparent response to the posthumous Lennon industry" and he said that due to McCartney's "voluminous input", the book was "more like a memoir, and a brittle one at that" rather than a biography.

Peter Doggett considers the tone of the narrative to be over-defensive, even though McCartney provides "all the evidence to prove [his] point", and he adds: "The person with the strongest claim to feeling diminished by McCartney's book was George Harrison, whose contribution to the Beatles was consistently underplayed." New Zealand Herald critic Graham Reid describes Many Years from Now as "a fascinating, if skewed and somewhat frustrating book" with minimal acknowledgement of Harrison and with Starr "again the invisible man". Reid laments the scarcity of information regarding McCartney's post-Beatles career and concludes of the book: "At its worst, it feels disingenuous and uncharitable, and yes, revisionist. But at its most enlightening – the songwriting, details of his London life – this is an unexpectedly revealing account of the most interesting years in a most interesting life."

== Sources ==
- Keith Badman, The Beatles Diary Volume 2: After the Break-Up 1970–2001, Omnibus Press (London, 2001; ISBN 0-7119-8307-0).
- Peter Doggett, You Never Give Me Your Money: The Beatles After the Breakup, It Books (New York, NY, 2011; ISBN 978-0-06-177418-8).
- Chris Ingham, The Rough Guide to the Beatles, Rough Guides/Penguin (London, 2006; 2nd edn; ISBN 978-1-8483-6525-4).
- Ian MacDonald, Revolution in the Head: The Beatles' Records and the Sixties, Pimlico (London, 1998; ISBN 0-7126-6697-4).
- Barry Miles, Paul McCartney: Many Years from Now, Secker & Warburg (London, 1998; ISBN 978-0-436-28022-1).
- Tim Riley, Tell Me Why – The Beatles: Album by Album, Song by Song, the Sixties and After, Da Capo Press (Cambridge, MA, 2002; ISBN 978-0-306-81120-3).
- Howard Sounes, Fab: An Intimate Life of Paul McCartney, HarperCollins (London, 2010; ISBN 978-0-00-723705-0).
