= Julia Baird (teacher) =

Sister of English musician John Lennon (born 1947)

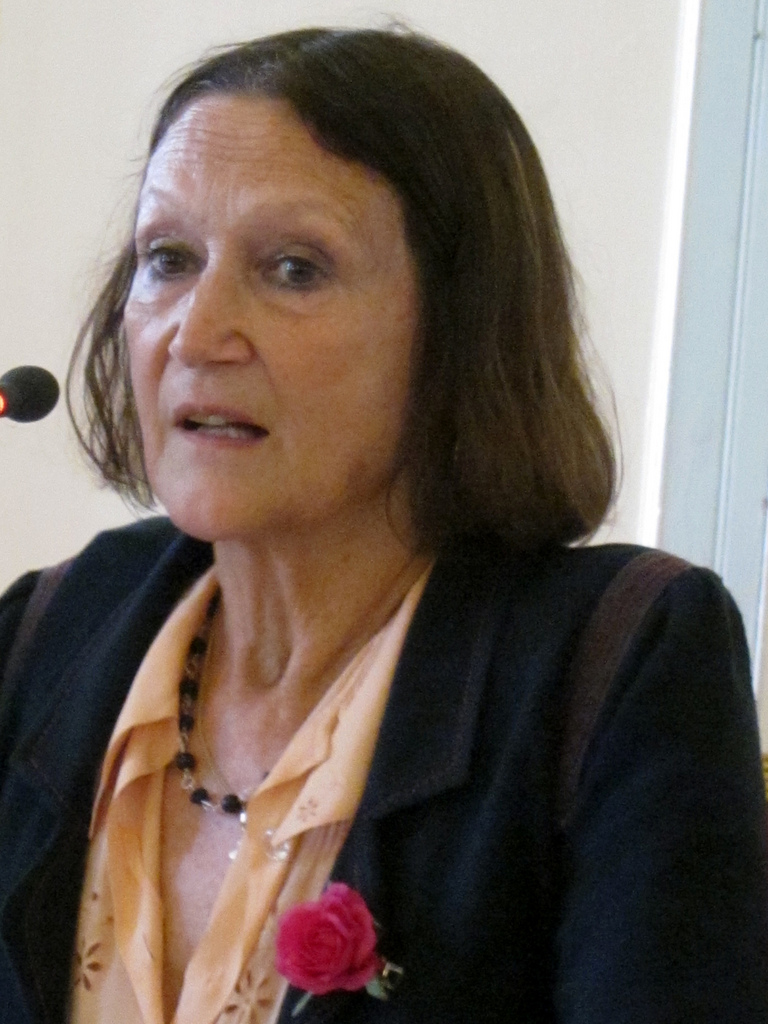
- Baird in 2011
- Born: Julia Dykins; 5 March 1947 (age 79); Liverpool, England
- Occupations: Teacher, educational psychologist, special needs teacher
- Spouse: Allen Baird (m. 1968; div. 1981)
- Partner: Roger Keys
- Children: 3
- Parent(s): Julia Lennon; John Dykins
- Relatives: John Lennon (half-brother); Mimi Smith (aunt); Julian Lennon (half-nephew); Sean Lennon (half-nephew)

Julia Baird (née Dykins; born 5 March 1947) is a retired British teacher and author. She is the younger half-sister of English musician John Lennon, and is the eldest daughter of his mother Julia Lennon and John "Bobby" Albert Dykins.

John Lennon started visiting the Dykins' house in 1951. After the death of Julia Lennon in 1958, Harriet and Norman Birch were appointed guardians of Julia and Jackie, ignoring Dykins's parentage, as he had never married their mother. John invited the Dykins sisters to visit after the success of the Beatles, when he was living in Kenwood, Weybridge, with his wife, Cynthia.

Julia Dykins married Allen Baird in 1968 and moved to Belfast. They had three children together but divorced in 1981. Baird worked as a French language teacher and special needs teacher, and after Lennon's death she wrote John Lennon, My Brother with Geoffrey Giuliano and gave up working in 2004 to write Imagine This – Growing Up with My Brother John Lennon. In 2009, the book was adapted into the film Nowhere Boy. She is now a director of Cavern City Tours in Liverpool.

== Early years ==
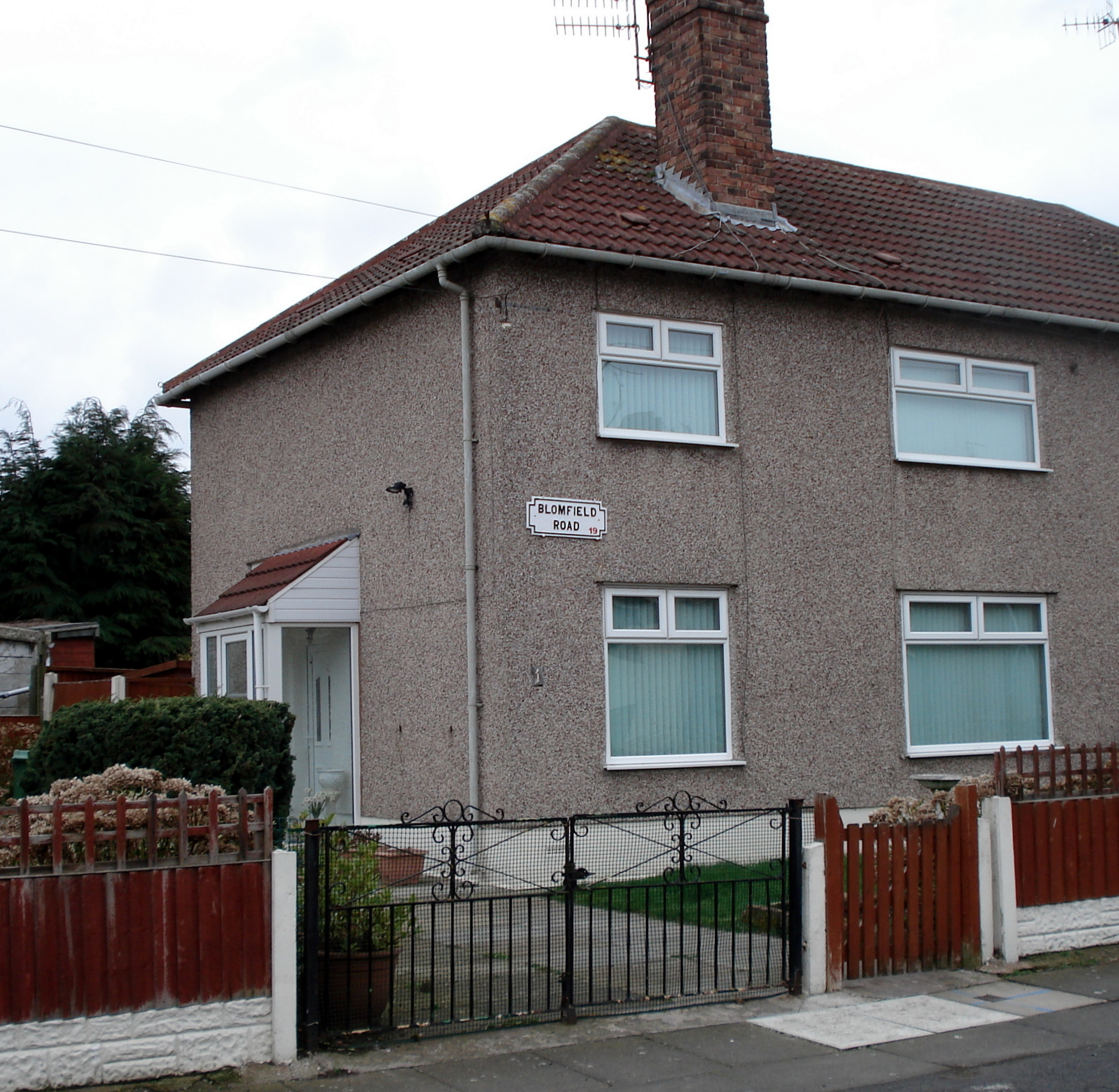
Julia and Dykins's house at 1 Blomfield Road, Liverpool, where Baird and Jackie Dykins lived

Baird's mother, Julia Lennon, was the fourth of five children in the Stanley family: Mary, known as "Mimi" (1906–1991), Elizabeth "Mater" (1908–1976), Anne "Nanny" (1911–1988), Julia "Judy" (1914–1958), and Harriet "Harrie" (1916–1973).

John Lennon was Julia's first child by Alfred Lennon, although she later had a daughter called Victoria (renamed Ingrid) after an affair with a Welsh soldier while Alfred was at sea. Julia was forced to give up the child for adoption after intense pressure from her father and her sisters. Although they had known each other previously, Julia started dating Bobby Dykins while working in a café near Mosspits, which was Lennon's primary school. Dykins was said to be a good-looking, well-dressed man who was several years older than Julia and worked at the Adelphi Hotel in Liverpool as a wine steward. Julia later moved into a small flat in Gateacre with Dykins, who had access to rationed goods like alcohol, chocolate, silks and cigarettes. The Stanley sisters called Dykins a "spiv", because of his pencil-thin moustache, margarine-coated hair, and pork-pie hat, but the young Lennon called him "Twitchy" because of a physical tic and nervous cough Dykins had. Although Julia never divorced Alfred Lennon, she was the common-law wife of Dykins, although Paul McCartney admitted to being sarcastic to Lennon about his mother living in sin while Julia was still married. Julia's sister, Mimi, called Julia and Dykins' home—at 1 Blomfield Road, Liverpool—"The House of Sin" and her own house (where Lennon lived) "The House of Correction". When Jackie was born prematurely on 26 October 1949, Julia went back to the hospital every day to see her, although she was often not allowed (by Mimi) to visit Lennon.

Dykins later managed several bars in Liverpool, which allowed Julia to stay at home at Blomfield Road, to look after Baird, Jackie, a cat named "Elvis", and the 11-year-old Lennon, who had started to visit and occasionally stayed overnight. Baird would give up her bed to Lennon, and share Jackie's double bed. Dykins used to give Lennon weekly pocket money (one shilling) for doing odd jobs, such as collecting golf balls on the local course, on top of the five shillings that Lennon's Aunt Mimi gave him. During Lennon's visits, he would climb trees with Baird and Jackie, test Baird's spelling, and once gave Baird half-a-crown to leave him alone when he wanted to kiss his first girlfriend. Baird remembered that after Lennon had visited them, her mother would often play a record called, My Son John, To Me You Are So Wonderful, "by some old crooner, and sit and listen to it". "My Son John"—sung by David Whitfield—was released in 1956. Although Mimi sent Lennon to his Aunt's croft in Sango Bay, Durness, Scotland, for his holidays, he later persuaded Mimi to let him take short holidays in North Wales with the Dykins family. Julia took Baird and Jackie to Rosebury Street, Liverpool, to watch Lennon play with The Quarrymen on the back of a flatbed coal truck on 22 June 1957. Baird was allowed to sit on the back, but as the music was too loud she asked to be taken off. The Quarrymen played twice that day as part of a celebration to mark the 750th anniversary of the granting of Liverpool's charter by King John. Lennon and McCartney would later rehearse in the bathroom of Blomfield Road because they said the acoustics "sounded like a recording studio".

=== Legal guardianship ===
Baird's mother was struck and killed on 15 July 1958, just outside Mimi's home, by a Standard Vanguard car driven by an off-duty constable, PC Eric Clague, who was a learner-driver. Clague later said: "Mrs Lennon just ran straight out in front of me. I just couldn't avoid her. I was not speeding, I swear it. It was just one of those terrible things that happen." Baird and Jackie (aged eleven and eight respectively) were immediately sent to stay in Edinburgh at their Aunt Mater's, and were not allowed to attend the funeral. They were told two months later by their uncle, Norman Birch, that their mother had died. Birch and their maternal aunt, Harriet, were made legal guardians of the girls—ignoring Dykins' parentage, as he had never legally married Julia. Julia was buried in Liverpool's Allerton Cemetery. Her grave is unmarked, and over the years its location was forgotten until it was recently identified by Jackie as "CE (Church of England) 38-805".

Baird and Jackie were taken to live with the Birches and their son at The Dairy Cottage, which was owned by Mimi's husband, George Smith. At the age of 14 Baird was allowed to go into Liverpool city centre by herself, where she drank cappuccino coffee in the Kardomah Coffee House, although Baird and her friends called it "frothy coffee". At 16, Baird started to hitch-hike to London, although her aunt never knew, as she would never have allowed it. Baird talked about the trips to London, and how relatively safe they were: "Hitching was easy then. It was a way of life. Everything was becoming more free. We'd start chatting to people in the Tube station and get invited to parties. People always gave us a place to stay – we were never harmed."

Baird and Jackie were asked to visit Lennon at Kenwood which was his home in Weybridge in 1964. Cynthia Lennon—Lennon's wife at the time—took them both out shopping in Knightsbridge, buying them expensive clothes. During the same visit, The Beatles played at the Finsbury Park Astoria, and the sisters asked to be allowed to stand near the front, but had to be pulled out of the audience by security guards because of the crush. In December 1965, Dykins was killed in a car crash at the bottom of Penny Lane. Lennon was not told about his death for months afterwards. Dykins had since married, but Baird acknowledges that she and Jackie had very little contact with his wife, and did not attend their father's funeral.

In 1968, Lennon was told The Dairy Cottage was too cramped for them all, so he told Birch to buy a house, and he found a 4-bedroom house in Gateacre Park Drive, Liverpool. Lennon told Birch to furnish and decorate it, and to send all the bills to him. The Dykinses heard nothing from Lennon for years, until he phoned Baird in 1975, and asked for mementos of his childhood life, such as his school tie and photographs. He sent £3,000 to cover the cost of shipping and as a gift, but wrote, "Don't tell Mimi". Lennon continued to call Baird until 1976, when the calls stopped. Jackie worked as a shop assistant during the 1970s, but battled against a heroin addiction. In the 1980s, and fully recovered, Jackie gave birth to her son, John, later working as a hairstylist. After Lennon and Harriet died, Yoko Ono wanted to sell the house—as it was still in Lennon's name—but later gave it to the Salvation Army on 2 November 1993, even though Lennon had once written: "I always thought of the house he's in [Birch] as my contribution towards looking after Julia [Baird] and Jackie. I would prefer the girls to use it."

== Later years ==
Julia married Allen Baird in 1968, moving to Belfast and keeping her family history a secret. The Bairds had three children: Nicholas (b. 1971), Sara (b. 1972) and David (b. 1980), and were divorced in 1981. Baird went to university and gained an MA in philosophy of education, and during the course of her degree she spent a year off in France, hitch-hiked around Europe, and protested against the war in Vietnam in Paris alongside Simone de Beauvoir. Baird later taught French and English before working as a special needs teacher with teenagers in deprived areas of Chester, until she retired to write books and become a director of Cavern City Tours.

Baird and Jackie met their half-sister Ingrid Pedersen for the first time on 7 December 2000 when they were present at the ceremony to place a Blue Heritage plaque on Mimi's house, commemorating the fact that Lennon had lived there. Baird and Jackie had only recently found out who Pedersen was, after being told by journalist Bill Smithies of the Liverpool Echo. Baird was shocked that Pedersen did not look anything like the Stanley or the Lennon family, having pale blue eyes and fair hair.

After releasing the book, John Lennon, My Brother—written with Giuliano, and a foreword by McCartney—Baird travelled to New York during 1989 to appear at a Beatlefest convention, and was asked if she could prove she was really Lennon's half-sister. Baird declined, saying she was not going to produce her passport, and the audience would just have to take her word for it. In 2000, Baird was present at the unveiling of six road signs, erected on major routes into Liverpool, saying, "Liverpool welcomes you – to the birthplace of THE BEATLES", and in October she planted a tree in Liverpool's Peace Garden to commemorate Lennon's birthday. Baird retired in 2004, and published a book called Imagine This – Growing up with my brother John Lennon, in February 2007. Baird's book was adapted into the 2009 British film Nowhere Boy. (Note: However, the credits for the completed film do not reference either the book or Baird, with sole writing credit accorded to screenwriter Matt Greenhalgh.)

From 28 to 30 September 2007, Durness held the John Lennon Northern Lights Festival which was attended by Baird (who read from Lennon's writings and her own books) and Stanley Parkes (Lennon's Scottish cousin). Parkes said, "Me and Julia [Baird] are going to be going to the old family croft to tell stories". Musicians, painters and poets from across the UK performed at the festival. Baird now lives in Chester with her partner, Roger Keys.

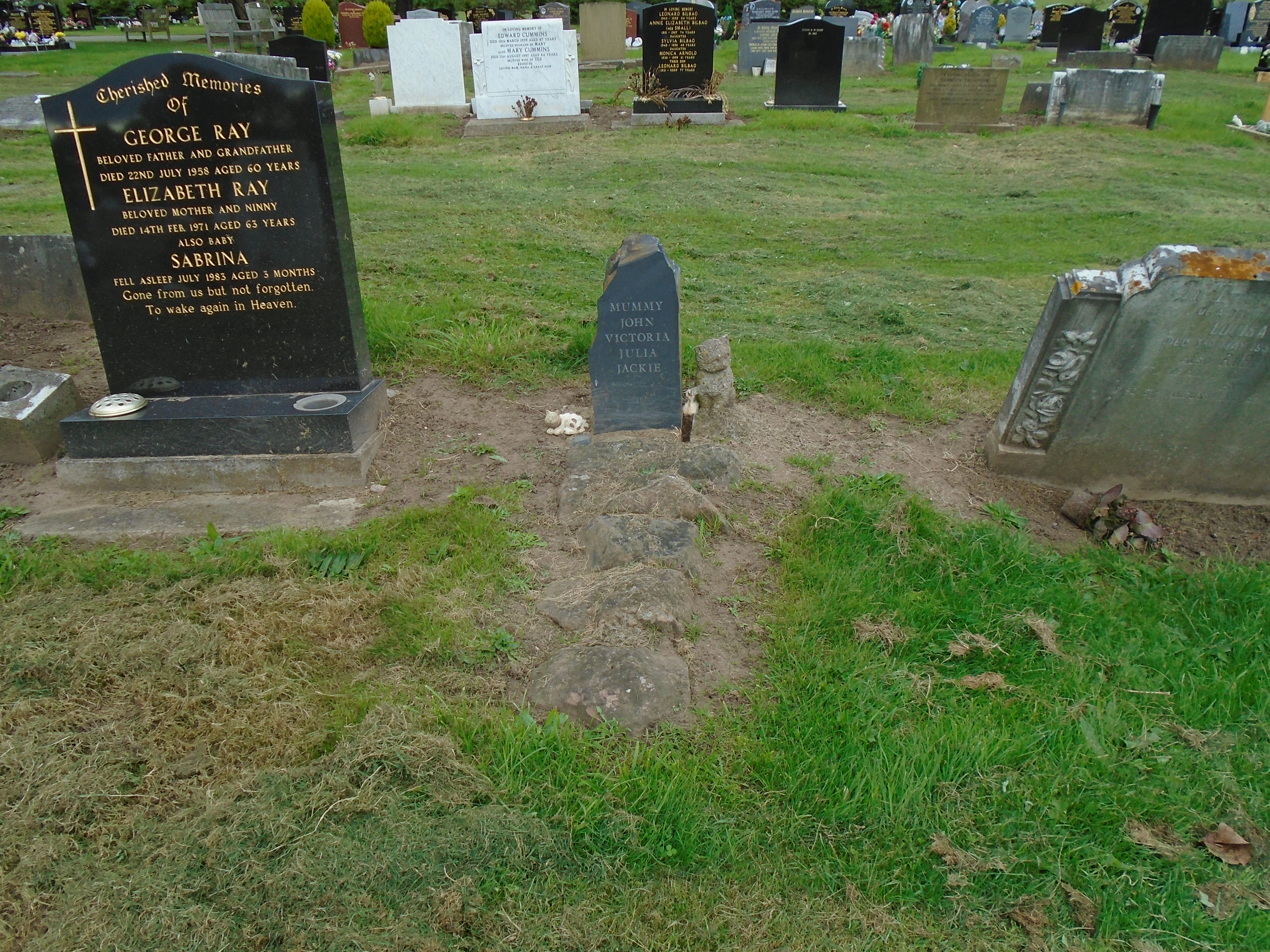
Grave of Julia Lennon

Baird claims she was never told that her mother was buried in Allerton Cemetery. The grave was unmarked, but the Stanley family later marked it with a headstone, reading "Mummy / John / Victoria / Julia / Jackie".

== Sources ==
- Baird, Julia; Giuliano, Geoffrey (1988). John Lennon, My Brother. Grafton. ISBN 978-0-246-13315-1.
- Baird, Julia (2007). Imagine This: Growing Up with my Brother John Lennon. Hodder & Stoughton. ISBN 978-0-340-83924-9.
- Giuliano, Geoffrey (2002). The Lost Beatles Interviews. Cooper Square Press. ISBN 978-0-8154-1226-7.
- Harry, Bill (2011). John Lennon Encyclopedia. Bargain Price (Paperback). ISBN 978-0-7535-3921-7.
- Lennon, Cynthia (2005). John. Hodder & Stoughton. ISBN 978-0-340-89512-2.
- Miles, Barry (1997). Many Years From Now. Vintage-Random House. ISBN 978-0-7493-8658-0.
- Spitz, Bob (2005). The Beatles: The Biography. Little, Brown and Company (New York). ISBN 978-0-316-80352-6.
- The Beatles Anthology (2003). The Beatles Anthology (DVD). Apple records. ASIN – B00008GKEG.
