= Haymans Green =

Studio album by the Pete Best Band
- Released: 16 September 2008
- Recorded: 2006–2008
- Studios: The Casbah Coffee Club, Liverpool, England
- Genre: Pop rock
- Length: 35:25
- Label: Lightyear Music
- Producers: Roag Best; Phil Melia; Paul Parry

Singles from Haymans Green
- 1. "Gone" Released: 16 September 2008

Professional ratings
Review scores
Source	Rating
AllMusic	3/5 stars

Haymans Green (Note: The title track is listed as "Hayman's Green", but the graphic used for the CD title omits the apostrophe.) is a 2008 album by the Pete Best Band, released by Lightyear Entertainment and distributed in the US and Canada by EMI. Pete Best plays drums, and co-wrote most of the tracks.

== History ==
Hayman's Green is the street in West Derby, Liverpool, where Best's mother Mona ran the Casbah Coffee Club.

== Artwork ==
The ripped image of the drummer on the cover is in reference to the "Anthology 1" illustration by artist Klaus Voormann. This fragment was removed from the "This is the [sic]…The Savage Young Beatles" grey market album cover of 1965 to show Ringo Starr's face from the "Please Please Me" photoshoot instead. Best and fellow beatle Stuart Sutcliffe appear elsewhere on the cover.

== Reviews ==
Reviews of the album have been mostly favourable, and have described the sound as being influenced by the Beatles with whom Best played between 1960 and 1962.

== Track listing ==
All tracks written by Pete Best, Roag Best, Phil Melia and Paul Parry, except where noted.

Haymans Green track listing
No.	Title	Writer(s)	Length
1.	"Come With Me"	Roag Best, Phil Melia, Paul Parry	2:23
2.	"Step Outside"		3:57
3.	"Round and Around"		2:38
4.	"Grey River"		3:18
5.	"Gone"		2:34
6.	"Dream Me Home"		3:47
7.	"Everything I Want"	R. Best, Melia, Parry	3:37
8.	"Beat Street"	R. Best, Melia, Parry	2:05
9.	"Broken"		3:56
10.	"Red Light"		4:01
11.	"Hayman's Green"		3:04
Total length:			35:25

== Personnel ==
- Pete Best – drums
- Roag Best – drums, percussion
- Tony Flynn – guitar, backing vocals, lead vocal on 4, second lead vocal on 9
- Phil Melia – guitar, harmonica, backing vocals, lead vocal on 3
- Paul Parry – guitar, piano, keyboards, lead vocals on all tracks except 3/4/8, backing vocals

Engineers – Nic Johnston and Kenny Jones
