= St John the Baptist's Church, Liverpool =

Saint John the Baptist, Tuebrook
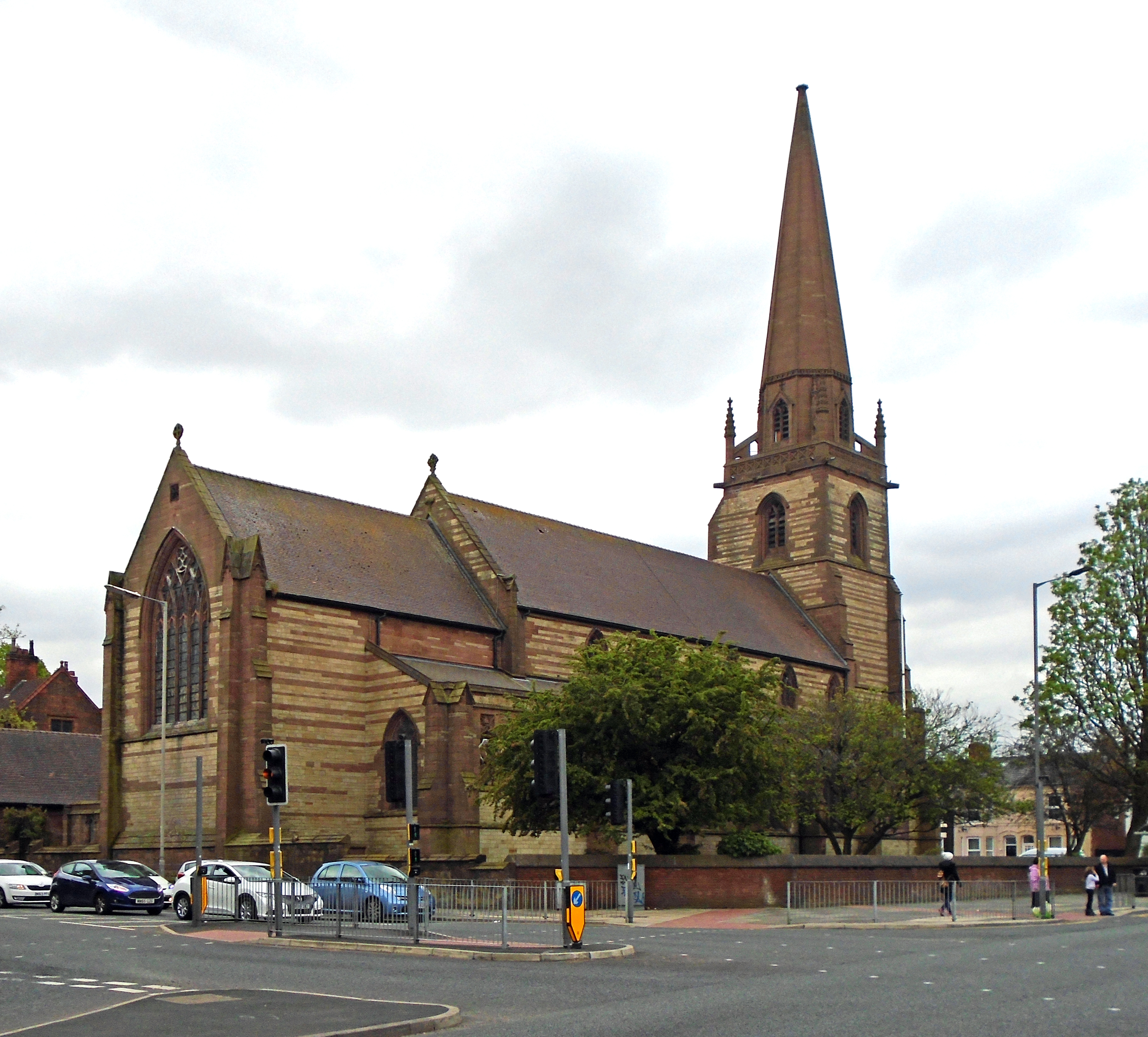
- Saint John the Baptist, Tuebrook
- Saint John the Baptist, Tuebrook
- 53.4248°N 2.9301°W
- OS grid reference: SJ 382 924
- Location: Tuebrook, Liverpool
- Country: England
- Denomination: Church of England
- Churchmanship: Traditional Catholic
- Website: www.stjohntuebrook.com

History
- Status: Parish church
- Dedication: St John the Baptist
- Consecrated: 20 May 1871

Architecture
- Functional status: Active
- Heritage designation: Grade I
- Designated: 28 June 1958
- Architect: George Frederick Bodley
- Architectural type: Church
- Style: Gothic Revival
- Groundbreaking: 1867
- Completed: 1870
- Construction cost: £25,000

Specifications
- Materials: Red and buff stone Tile and slate roofs

Administration
- Province: York
- Diocese: Liverpool
- Archdeaconry: Liverpool
- Deanery: West Derby

Clergy
- Bishop: The Rt Revd Stephen Race (AEO)
- Vicar: Fr Nicholas Johnson SSC
- Priest: Canon Christopher Cook

The Church of Saint John the Baptist is an active Anglican parish church in the Diocese of Liverpool and lies in the archdeaconry of Liverpool and the deanery of West Derby. It is situated on the corner of West Derby Road and Green Lane, in Tuebrook, Liverpool, England. It was built in the 1860s to a design by George Frederick Bodley and is Grade I listed, as a building of exceptional architectural interest. The site also contains the Victorian vicarage and a mortuary house, also by Bodley and both Grade II listed. It is also the site of the Brockman Memorial Hall, an early venue of the Beatles.

== History ==
The church was built between 1867 and 1870, its cost of £25,000 (equivalent to £2,572,851 in 2025), being totally met by the wife of Revd J.C. Reade. The architect was George Frederick Bodley. The interior was redecorated in 1910 by Henry Hare to Bodley's design. This was restored in 1968–71 by Stephen Dykes Bower.

There was controversy before the church was consecrated because Bodley intended to use an early 16th-century altarpiece from Antwerp which had carved tableaux of the Passion as the reredos. However the Bishop of Chester considered it to be too "Popish" and he refused to consecrate the church until it was removed. The altarpiece is now in St Michael's Church, Brighton.

== Present day ==
The parish continues in the Anglo-Catholic tradition that it was founded. The restrictions brought by the COVID-19 pandemic forced the church to reduce the number of services. St John's hosts a weekly foodbank in the church hall. The church has a Sunday School. St John's began live streaming Mass on Sunday when public worship was suspended in March 2020.

== Architecture ==
St John's church is recorded in the National Heritage List for England as a designated Grade I listed building.

=== Exterior ===
The church is built in red and buff stone, which is irregularly banded. The main roof is tiled, while the roofs of the aisles are of slate. Its plan consists of a five-bay nave with a clerestory, north and south aisles under lean-to roofs, a west tower, a north porch, a chancel with a chapel to the north, the organ loft to the south and a detached vestry connected to the chancel by a short passage. The tower has angled buttresses and a west entrance above which is a three-light window. The top stage has two-light louvred bell-openings and a panelled parapet with pinnacles at the corners. The spire is recessed on an octagonal base containing gabled two-light openings and it is attached to the pinnacles by flying buttresses. At the south east corner of the tower is a lean-to stair turret. The porch has a flat roof with a parapet and a niche over the entrance containing a statue.

=== Interior ===
Pollard and Pevsner describe the interior as being "glorious" and "richly coloured" due to the "resplendent display of Bodley fittings and the vibrant decoration". The citation in the National Heritage List for England states it is "one of the finest examples of Victorian polychromy". The walls and the roofs are all richly stencilled, and in addition there is a wall painting on the east wall of the nave by C. E. Kempe. The gilt reredos dates from 1871 and has panels painted by Kempe.

The area under the tower has made into the Chapel of the Holy Rood and contains a reredos, an altar and a credence table which were adapted in 1978 from a rood screen of 1890 by Bodley which was taken from Dunstable Priory. The pulpit and the octagonal font were both designed by Bodley, as were the richly painted screens (again with panels by Kempe). The stained glass in the east window and the south window in the chancel is by Morris & Co.; some of the windows elsewhere are by Burne-Jones. In the church is a brass memorial dating from 1926 by Hare which consists of a life-size figure of Rev. Ralph Brockman. The memorial to the First World War is a statue of Mary, also by Hare; that to the Second World War is a statue of John the Baptist by Sir Ninian Comper. The statue commissioned by Canon Sampson might never have been sculpted, for Comper was initially reluctant to undertake this commission, only relenting at the behest of his son, whom Comper then used as the model.

There is a ring of eight bells which were cast in 1869 by John Warner & Sons, two service bells and a dumb (practice) bell. The bells have been retuned and rehung in a new bell frame constructed by voluntary labour. They were rung for the first time on Easter Sunday 2003 after a silence of ten years.

== Images ==
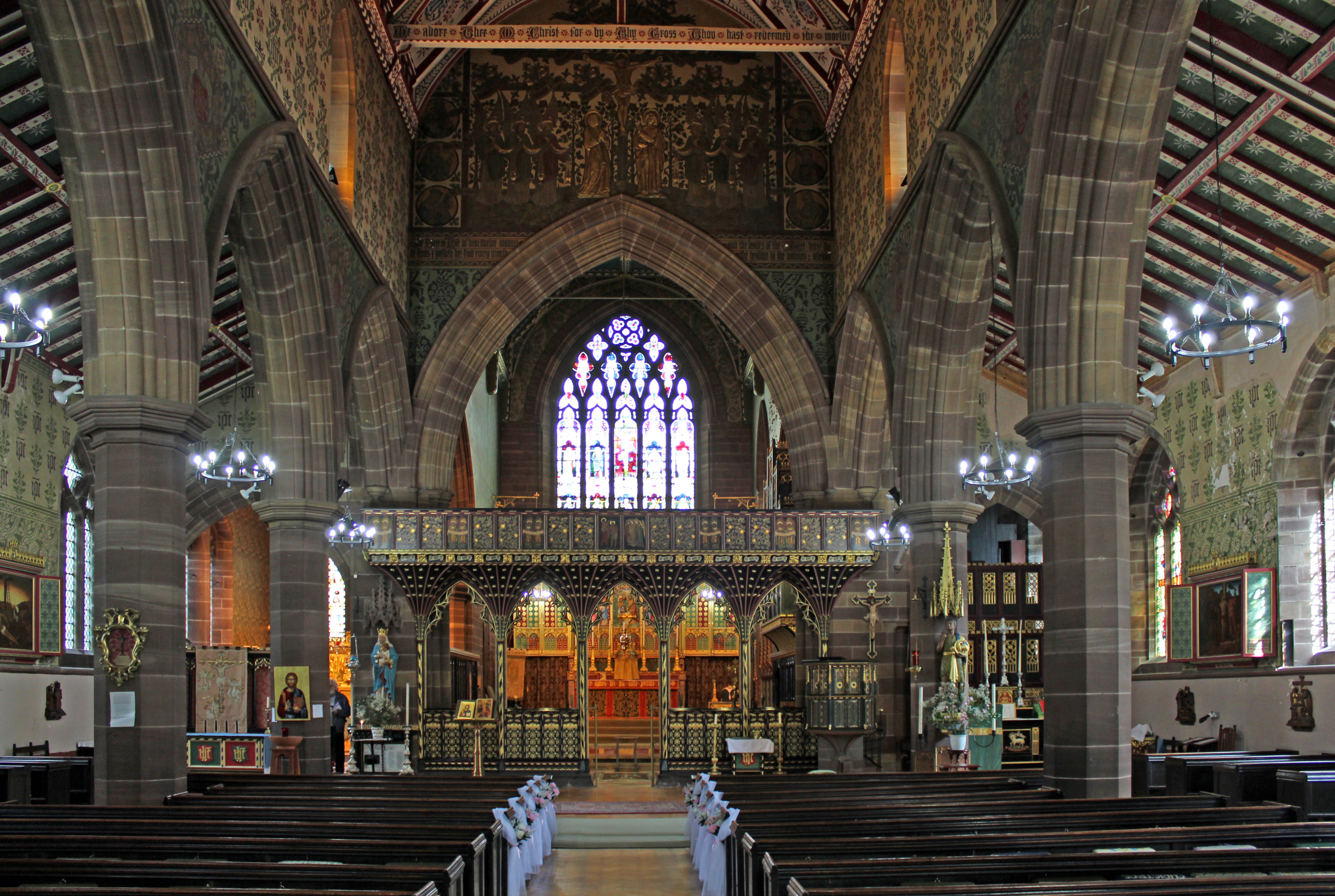
View along nave to chancel

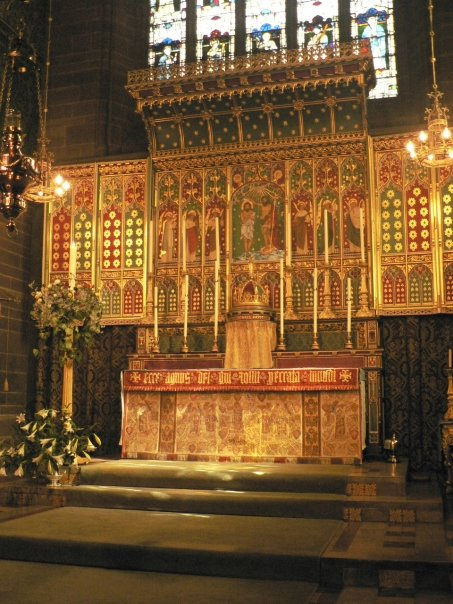
High altar and reredos

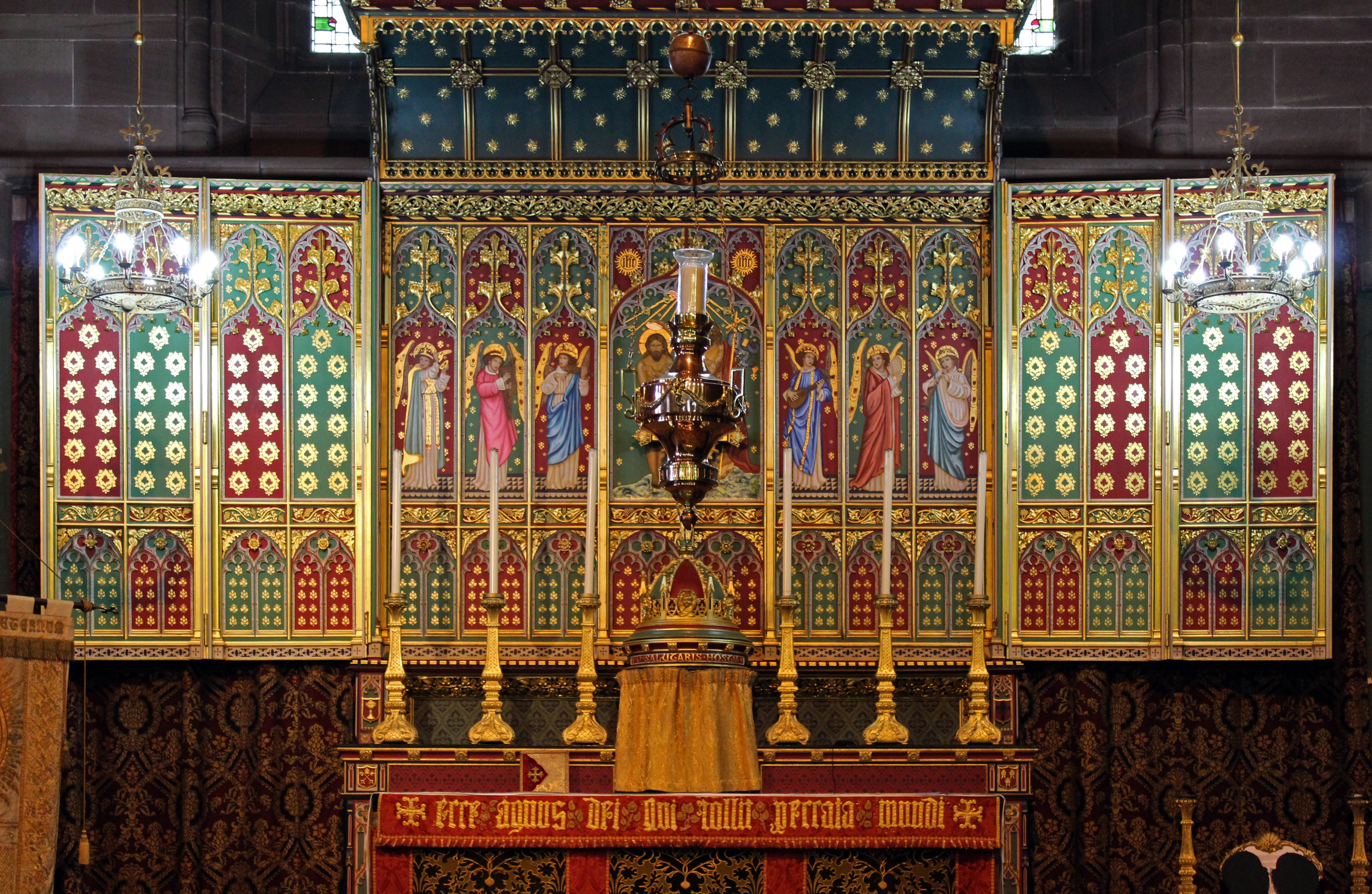
Detail of reredos

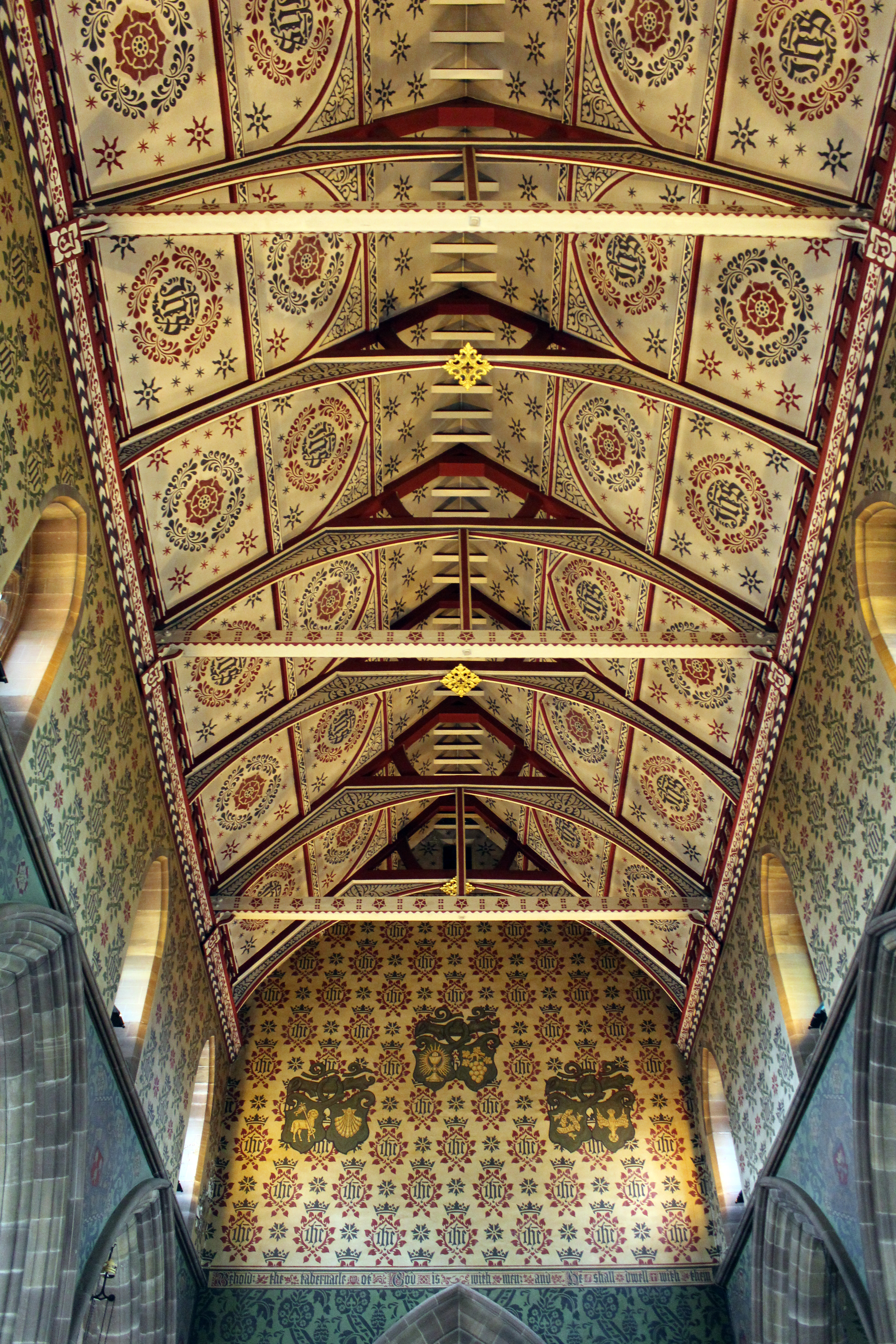
The ceiling looking west

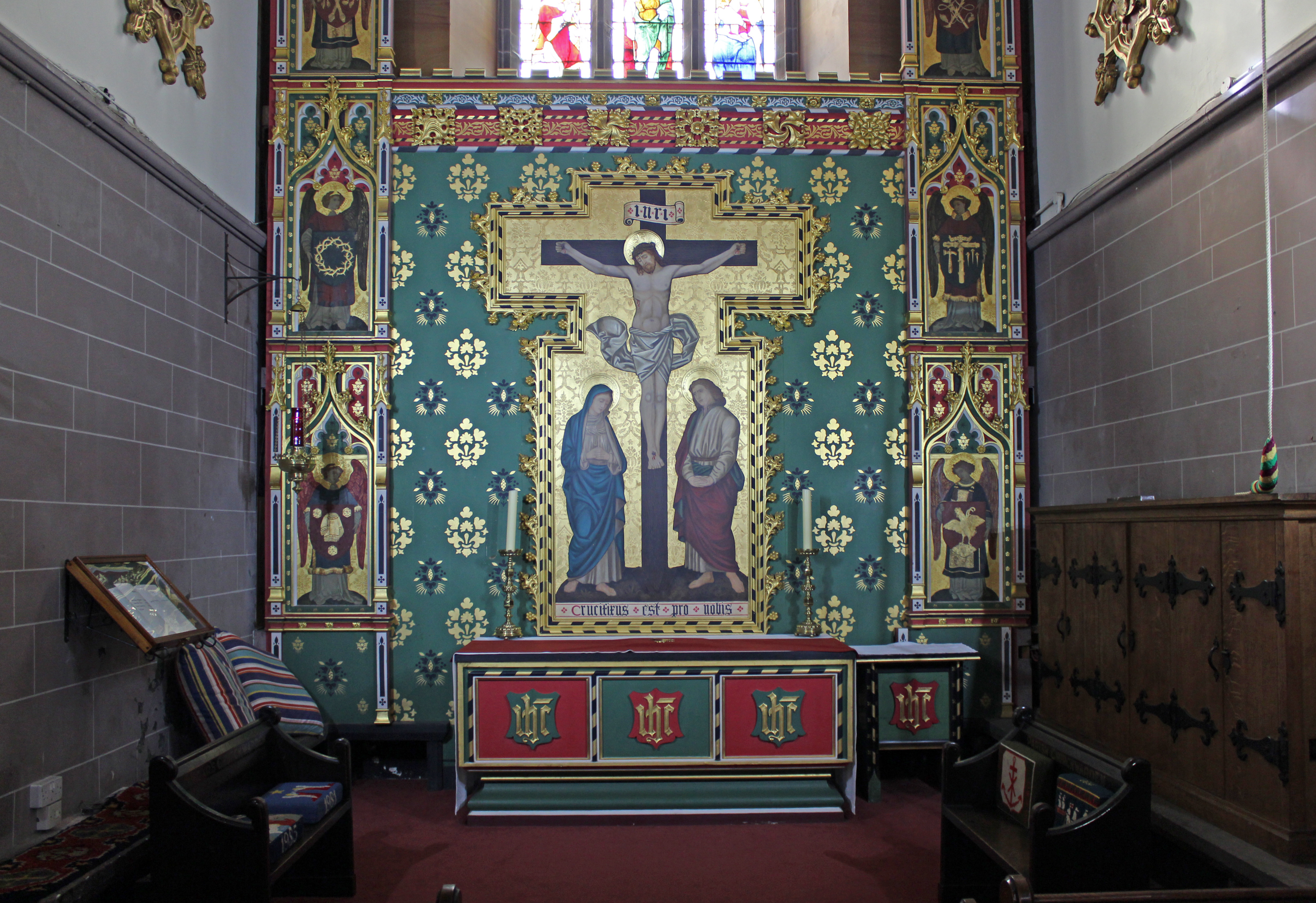
Chapel of the Holy Rood

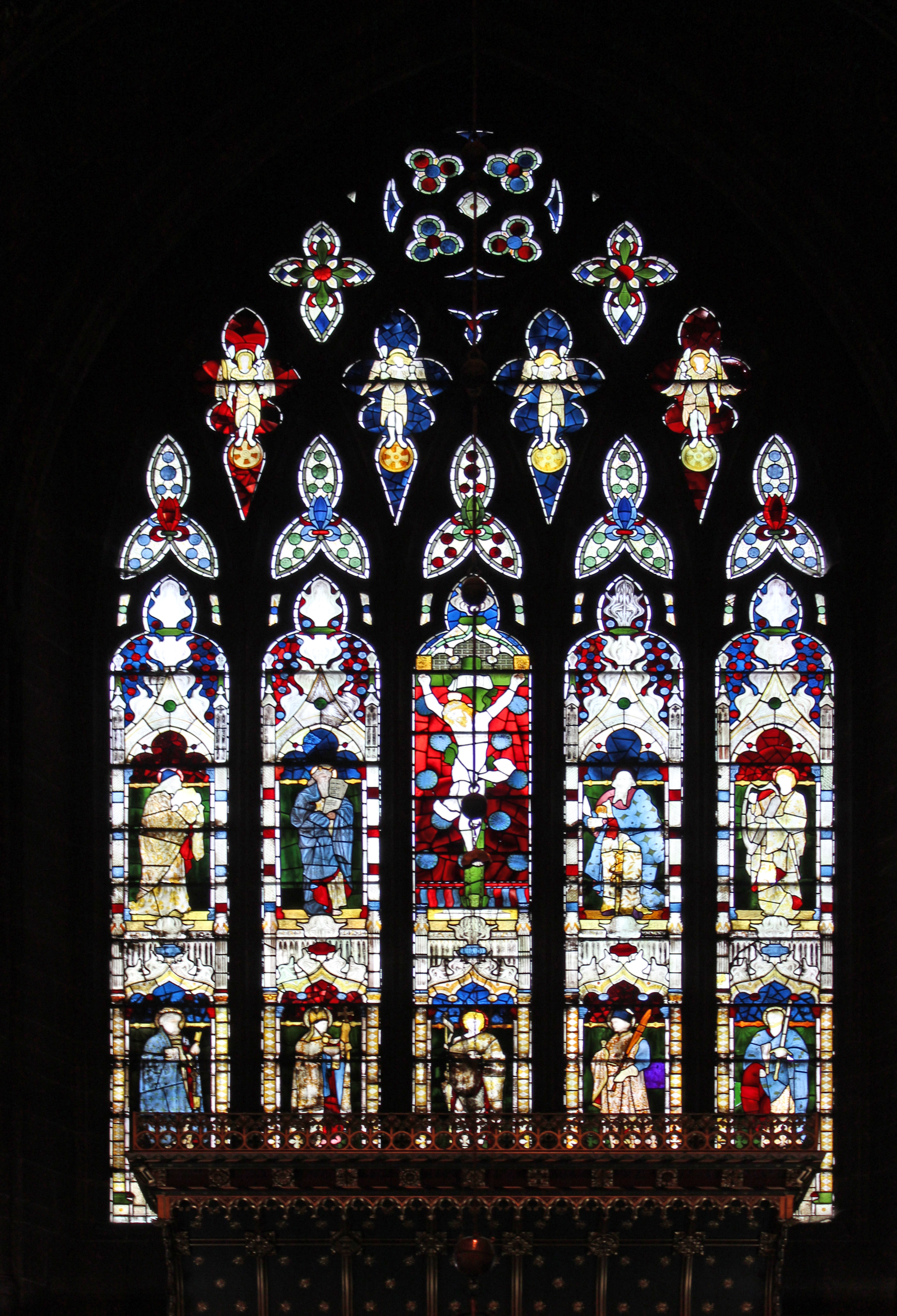
East window by William Morris Co.

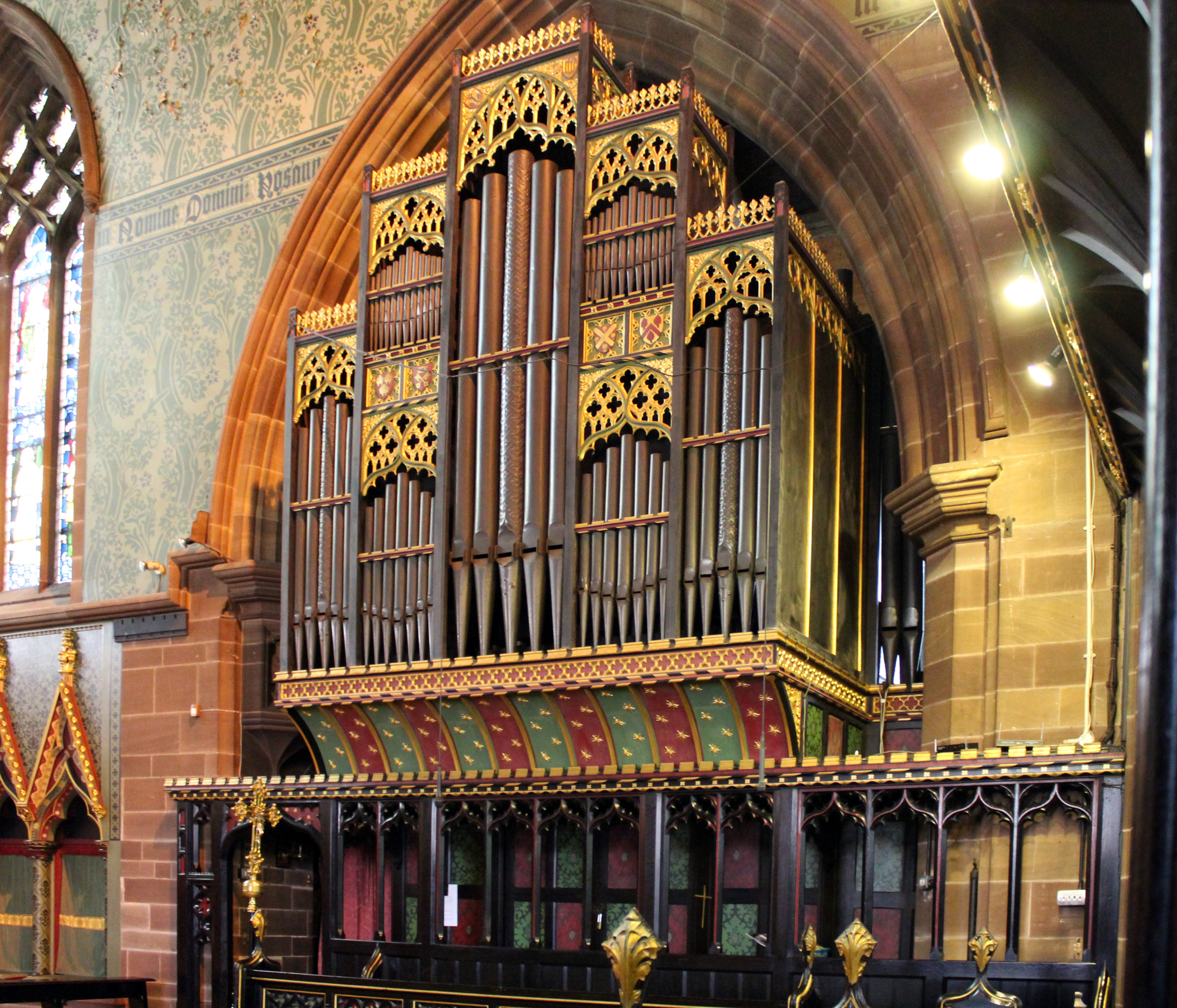
The Hill organ

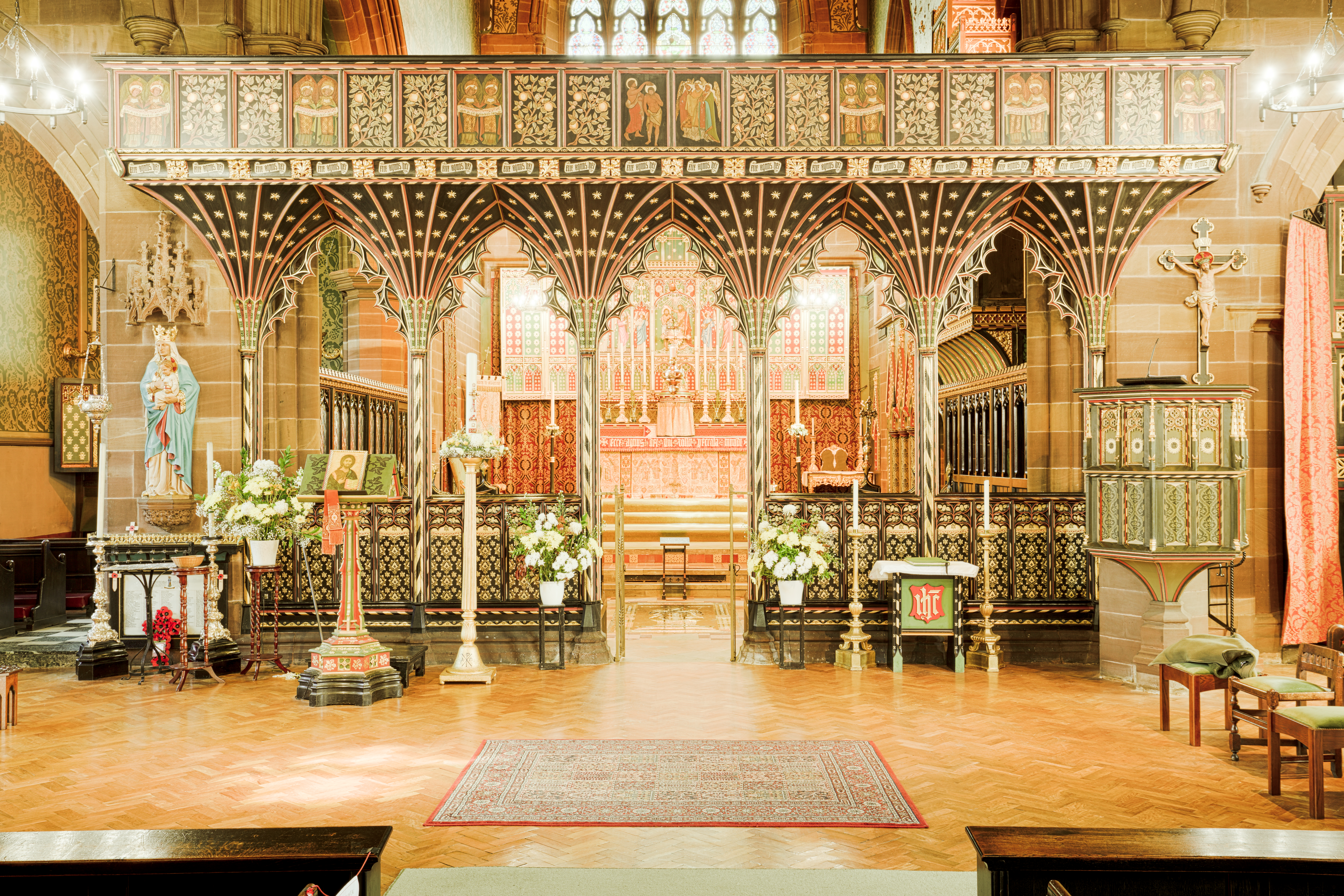
The Rood Screen

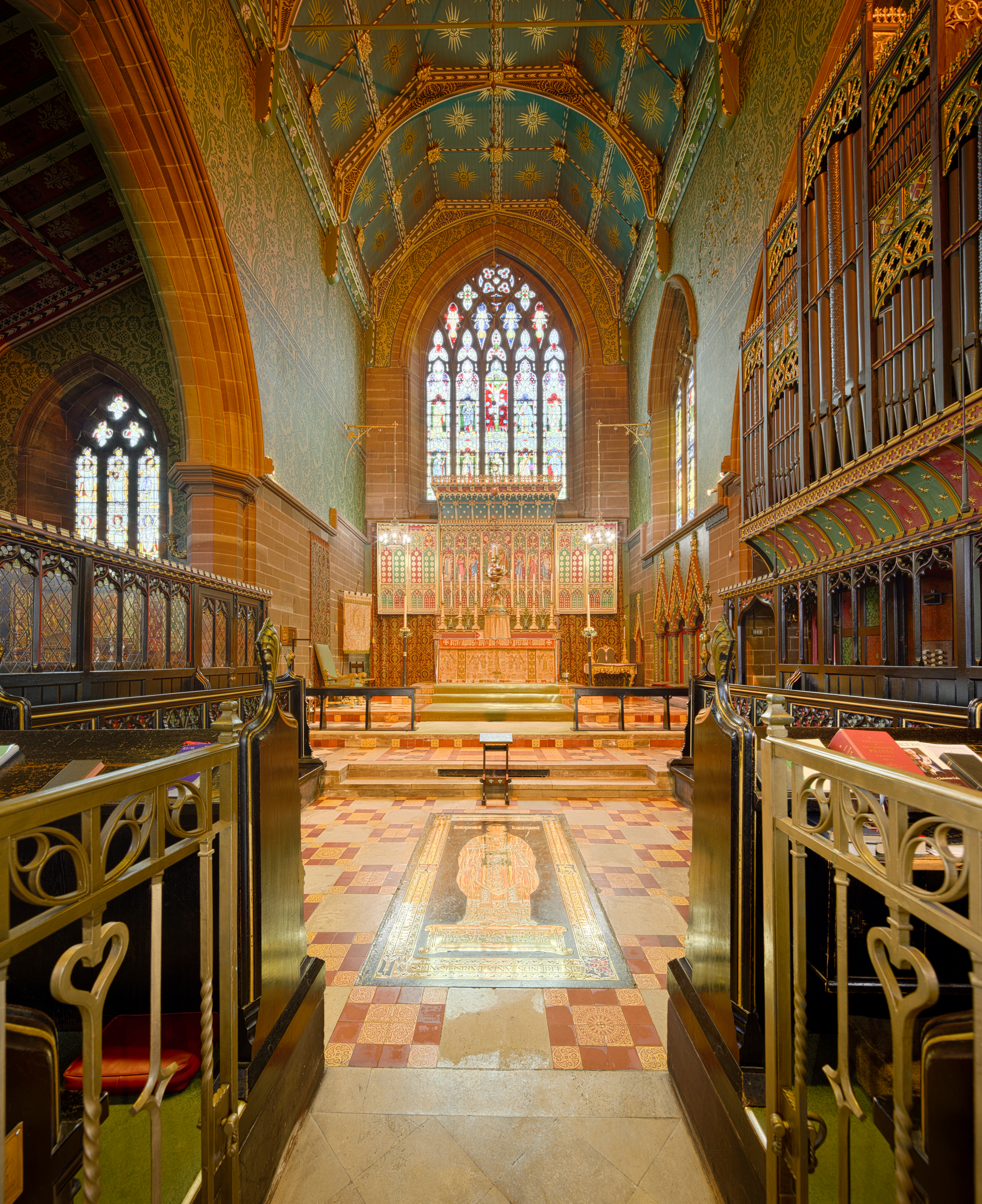
The Chancel

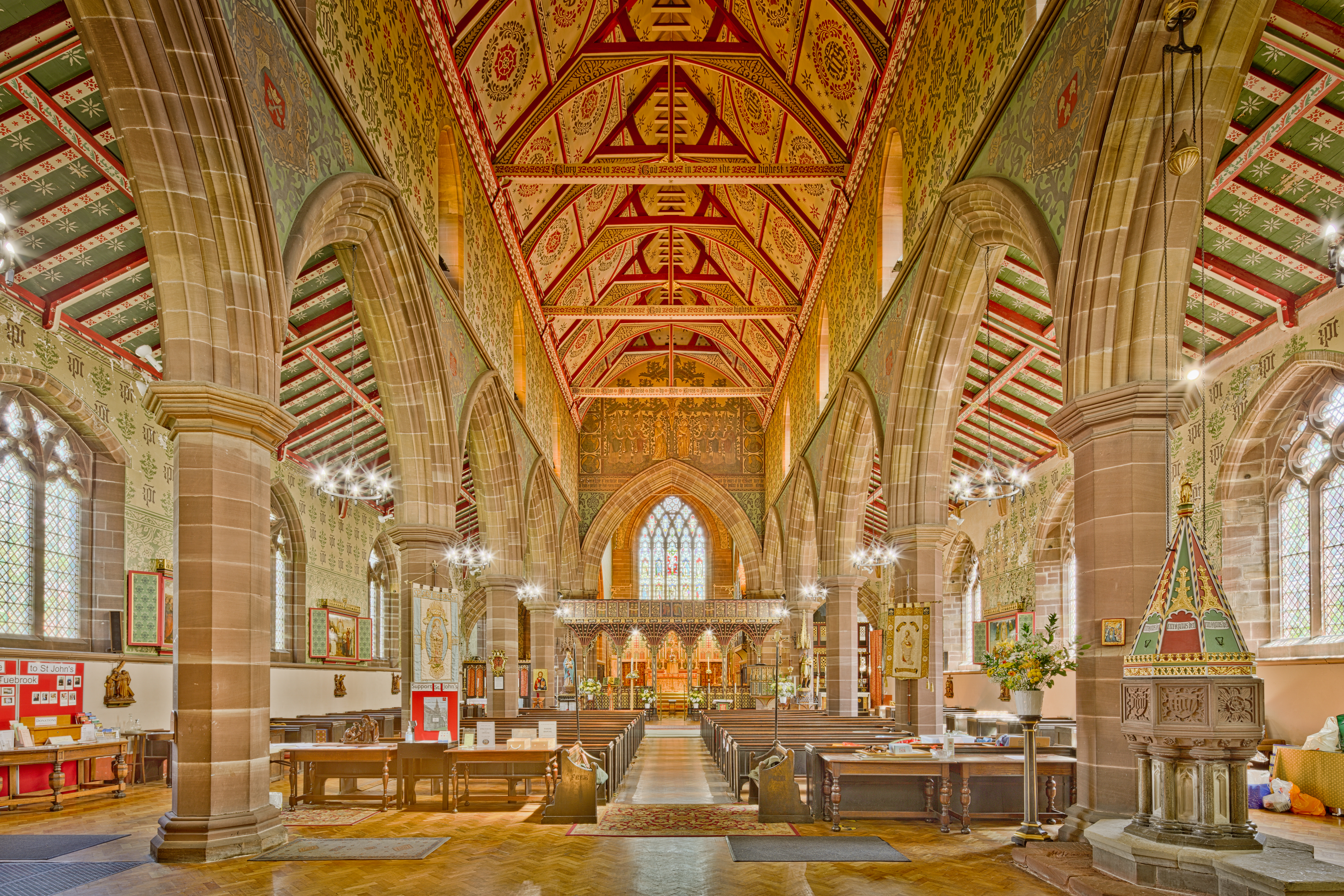
View of the Nave from the back

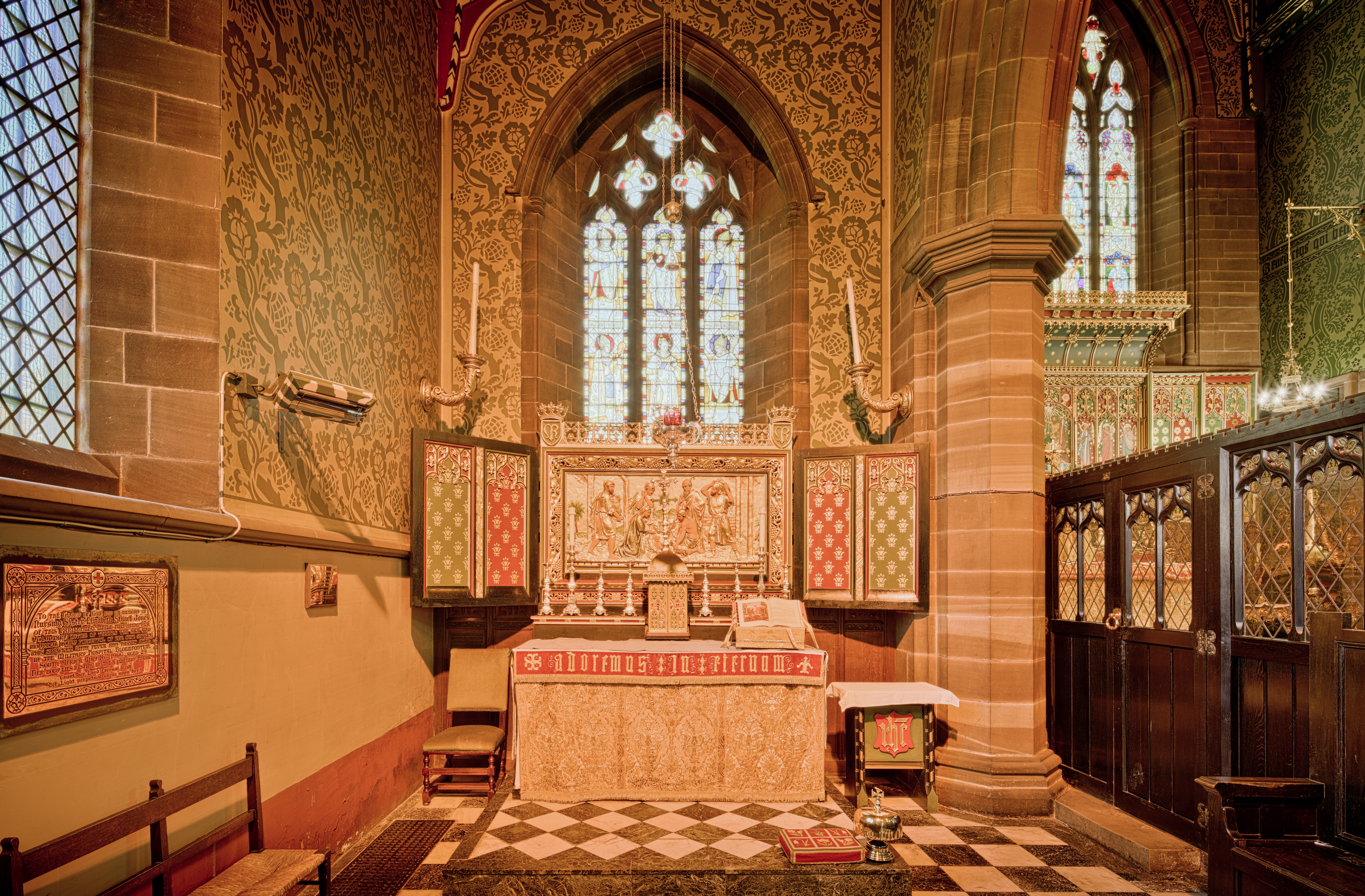
The Lady Chapel

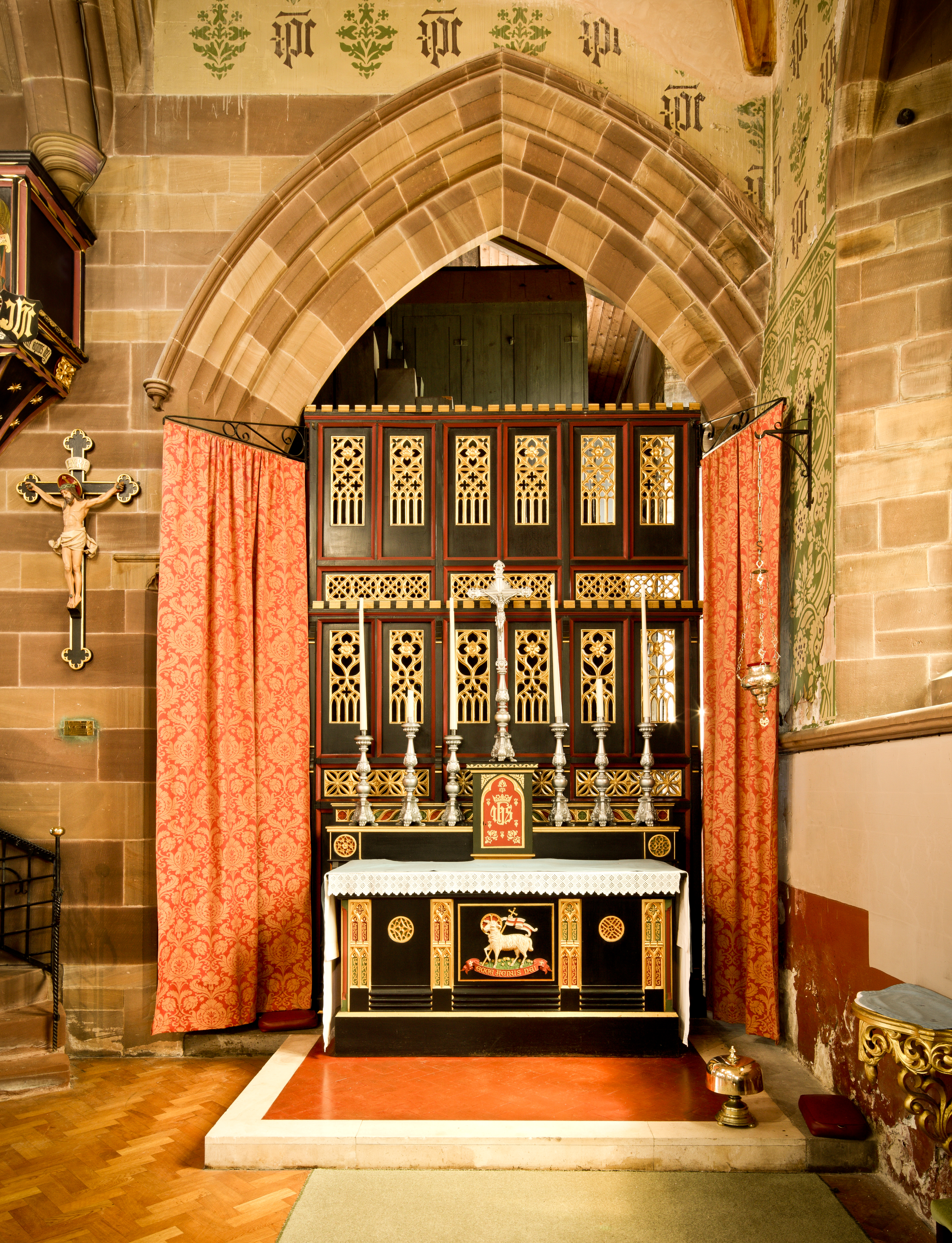
St John's Chapel

The Holy Rood Chapel

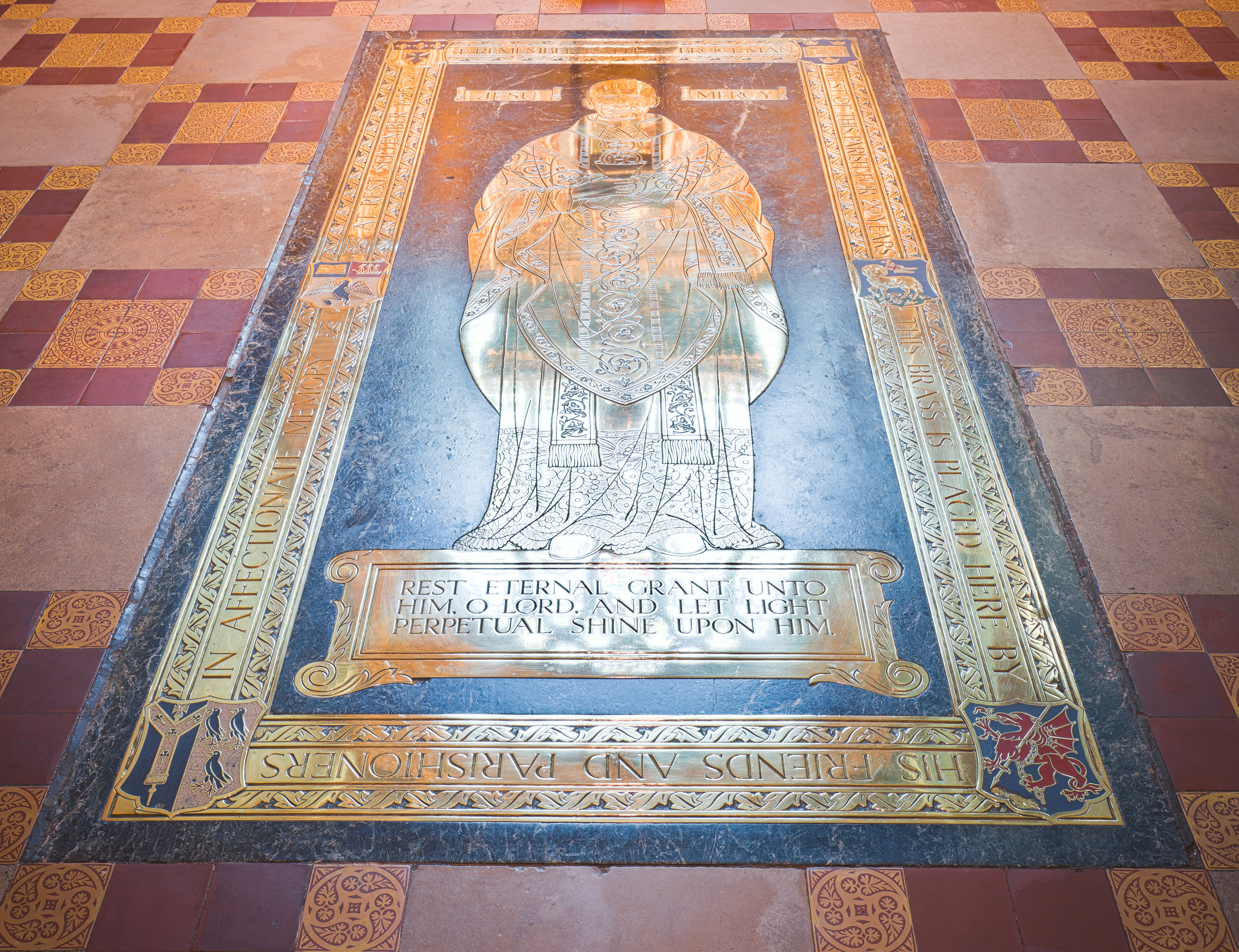
Father Brockman Memorial

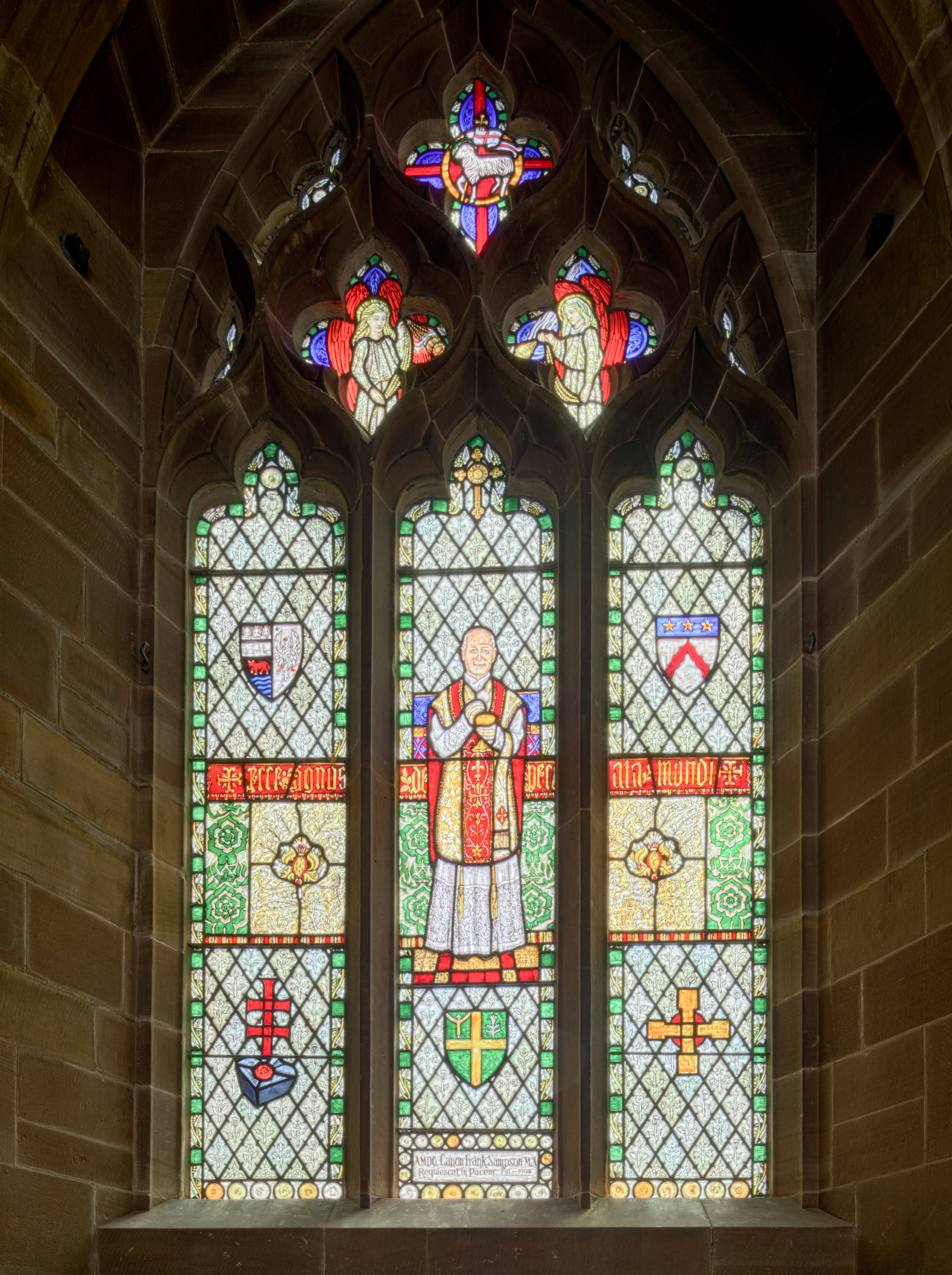
Stained Glass window dedication to Canon Frank Sampson

== Incumbents ==
- 1871–1880 Rev J.C.Reade
- 1880–1884 Rev J.Lindsay
- 1884–1892 Fr F.H.Chenevix Trench
- 1892–1895 Fr P.N. Clark
- 1895–1896 Fr H.N.Thompson
- 1896–1925 Fr Ralph T.Brockman
- 1925–1937 Fr Thomas Brancker
- 1937–1946 Fr W.H.Tayler
- 1946–1994 Rev Canon Frank Sampson MA
- 1994–2010 Rev Dr Canon Paul Nener BM BCh FRCS
- 2010 – 2020 Rev Canon Simon J.P. Fisher MA
- 2021 - Fr Nicholas Johnson SSC

Fr Nicholas Johnson was instituted, collated and installed as vicar on 24 June 2021, the feast of the Nativity of St John the Baptist.

== Music ==
=== Organists ===
- Claude Ridley 1871–1882
- William Faulkes (organist-composer) 1882 – 1886
- R.Cooper ARCO 1896–1900
- Ernest Welsh ARCO 1900–1903
- Mr Tubb (senior) 1903–1933
- C.F. Holt 1935–1953
- Edward Tubb 1953–1956
- C.F. Holt 1956–1966
- David James (Assistant Organist 1966 then Organist from 1973 to 1982)
- Keith Simpson BA (Hons) Dip HE 1982-1996
- David Scott-Thomas 1996-1998
- Clive Arnold 2000–2009
- John Peace BA LRAM ARCO 2009–2017
- Nathaniel Hood BA 2017-2019
- Daniel Mansfield BA(Hons), ARCO, HonFTCSM, MISM 2019-

=== The Organ ===
The fine instrument at St John's was built by William Hill and Son of London, and installed in 1867 and was installed in St John's in time for the consecration in 1871. Hill organs have a distinctive voice, perhaps due to William Hill's study of continental organ styles, characterised by a bright, singing tone, with fiery reeds and brilliant upper work.

in 1895, some additions were made: the Bassoon on the Choir organ, and string tone pipes on the Swell organ, installed in a miniature swell box behind the main box. The tubular-pneumatic key and stop actions would also appear to date from 1895. There is evidence that for a certain period, a detached console was installed in the Lady Chapel. However, in 1905, it was decided revert to the original (and current) position within the organ case, possibly due to mechanical problems.

Essential re-leathering work was carried out by David Wells Organ Builders of Liverpool between 1991 and 2009. The organ case was designed by G.F. Bodley, who often commissioned work from Hill.

The Organ at St. John's is one of the few organs by Hill which remain more or less unaltered, a factor which led to the granting of an Historic Organ Certificate in 2009.

== Vicarage ==
The original vicarage, was completed in 1890, was also designed by Bodley. It is a Grade II listed building in grey brick with red brick bands and red sandstone dressings. It has three storeys and a tile roof.

== Mortuary house ==
Also on site is the ruin of a Victorian mortuary house, also designed by Bodley and Grade II listed. It is situated in the north-west angle of the vicarage garden, facing onto Snaefell Avenue.

== Brockman Hall ==
South of the main church building is the church hall, previously known as the Brockman Memorial Hall. It is notable for being an early venue for the Beatles

Thanks to the research by Gerry Murphy, a Beatles historian and graduate of Liverpool Hope University's Popular Music and Society it can be confirmed that The Beatles played at the Brockman Hall Tuebrook a dozen times in 1961. He also maintains that Brian Epstein discovered them at the Brockman Hall and not at the Cavern as has always been believed. Epstein was identified by several members of the audience who recognised him from Nems music store.

The bookings were made by Mona Best, mother of Pete, who decided to follow the lead of other bands who were widening their profile by playing in local Halls. Their first appearance was on 17 February when the band played with Gene Day and the Jango Beats. The audience was 200 strong, drawing teenagers from all over Tuebrook, Stoneycroft and Old Swan. The cost of entry for fans was 3s 6d and doors opened at 8.15 pm. The Beatles were paid £20.00. They played again in March on three occasions and four times in July. Their final appearance was on 31 August.

== See also ==
- Grade I listed churches in Merseyside
