= Cayenne (instrumental) =

1960 instrumental by the Beatles (then known as the Quarrymen)

Instrumental by the Beatles (then known as the Quarrymen)

from the album Anthology 1
- Released: 20 November 1995 (UK); 21 November 1995 (US)
- Recorded: April 1960
- Studio: 20 Forthlin Road, Liverpool
- Genre: Instrumental rock
- Length: 1:14
- Songwriter: Paul McCartney

"Cayenne" is an instrumental track by the Beatles. It was recorded in 1960, when they were still known as the Quarrymen, and was not officially released until its inclusion on the 1995 album Anthology 1.

According to Paul McCartney, the recordings were made in the McCartney family bathroom in April 1960 while they were rehearsing. The song is not credited to Lennon–McCartney but to McCartney alone, indicating that at this stage Lennon and McCartney had not agreed on the joint writing credit that they used for all of the band's professional recording career. The track is an instrumental jam similar in style to that of The Shadows. Stuart Sutcliffe plays bass with what critic Richie Unterberger described as an "artless thump". "Cayenne" is a 12-bar blues composition in the key of D minor.

"Cayenne" and two other homemade Quarrymen recordings, "Hallelujah I Love Her So" and "You'll Be Mine", were included in Anthology 1, a collection of Beatles rarities and alternative tracks from 1958 to 1964. They are the only officially released Beatles recordings to feature Stuart Sutcliffe on bass. Sutcliffe, John Lennon's close friend from art college, joined the band in 1960 as the bass player and played with them in Hamburg in 1960 and 1961 before leaving to concentrate on his art studies. Sutcliffe died of a brain haemorrhage in 1962. Although the recording was made in 1960, the tape was not discovered until much later by the McCartneys' Forthlin Road neighbours.

The song was in the instrumental rock style, which was becoming popular in the early sixties with bands such as The Shadows. Another instrumental the band did around this time was "Cry for a Shadow" in 1961. The only instrumental released on a mainline Beatles album was Flying from Magical Mystery Tour in 1967.

The title of the track is of uncertain meaning, probably referring to Cayenne pepper, due to the piece's samba influence.

== Personnel ==
- Paul McCartney – lead guitar
- John Lennon – rhythm guitar
- Stuart Sutcliffe – bass guitar
