= Anthology 1 =

Compilation album by the Beatles
- Released: 20 November 1995
- Recorded: 12 July 1958 – 18 October 1964; c. 1977 and February–March 1994
- Genre: Merseybeat
- Length: 124:54
- Labels: Apple (CDP 7243 8 34445 2), Capitol
- Producers: George Martin, Jeff Lynne ("Free as a Bird")

The Beatles chronology
Live at the BBC (1994)	Anthology 1 (1995)	Anthology 2 (1996)

Singles from Anthology 1
- 1. "Free as a Bird" Released: 4 December 1995

Anthology 1 is a compilation album of music by the Beatles, released on 20 November 1995 by Apple Records as part of The Beatles Anthology series. It features rarities, outtakes and live performances from the period 1958–64, including songs with original bass player Stuart Sutcliffe and drummer Pete Best. It is the first in a quartet of albums with Anthology 2, Anthology 3 and Anthology 4, all of which tie in with the televised special The Beatles Anthology. It contains "Free as a Bird", the first new Beatles song in 25 years, which was released as a single two weeks after Anthology 1.

The album topped the Billboard 200 album chart and was certified 8× Platinum by the RIAA. It reached number 2 on the UK albums chart.

The Anthology albums were remastered and made available digitally on the iTunes Store on 14 June 2011, individually and as part of the Anthology Collection box set.

== Content ==
The album includes material from the Beatles' days as the Quarrymen, up to the Decca audition to sessions for the album Beatles for Sale. It is of historical interest as the only official release of performances with Pete Best and Stuart Sutcliffe in the band. Sutcliffe, the band's original bass player during 1960, and sporadically during the group's second Hamburg season, appears on the Disc One tracks "Hallelujah, I Love Her So", "You'll Be Mine" and "Cayenne"; while Best – who was the official drummer from just prior to the group's first departure for Hamburg in August 1960, until 15 August 1962 when he was replaced by Ringo Starr – is on the Disc One tracks 10–12, 15–19 and 21–22.

Disc One, tracks 10–12, were recorded at a session in Hamburg where the Beatles served as the back-up band to the English rock and roll musician Tony Sheridan. Some songs from this session were released on the 1962 album My Bonnie, credited to Tony Sheridan and the Beat Brothers. The song "My Bonnie" would be their introductory single in England, featuring Sheridan on lead vocal and guitar. Tracks 21–22 are the only surviving recordings of the Beatles' first EMI session. Track 22 is the original recording of "Love Me Do", which would be re-recorded by the group four months later for their first single. Track 24 features EMI session drummer Andy White in place of Starr.

Disc Two contains performances from comedy duo Morecambe and Wise's popular television programme Two of a Kind, as well as the opening song from their famed performance on The Ed Sullivan Show, which introduced the band to most of the US in 1964.

The flash-point for the album came with the song "Free as a Bird" – the three remaining Beatles Paul McCartney, George Harrison and Ringo Starr re-working a John Lennon demo recording given to McCartney by Lennon's widow, Yoko Ono. Produced by Harrison's Traveling Wilburys bandmate Jeff Lynne, the three added additional music and lyrics, instrumentation and backing vocals, with McCartney and Harrison both taking a turn at a lead vocal. Released a week after the compilation, the CD single featured three exclusive B-sides.

The live BBC Radio recording of "Lend Me Your Comb" was held back from Live at the BBC for inclusion on this album, but it was later also included on On Air – Live at the BBC Volume 2.

== Album cover ==
The cover of Anthology 1 is the first third of the Anthology collage made by Klaus Voormann and Alfons Kiefer. Various photographs and album covers are torn and collected together. Pete Best's face was torn away from the Savage Young Beatles record jacket in the centre of the album cover, revealing the face of his successor, Ringo Starr, below. The bottom leftmost photograph on the Anthology 1 cover does feature an unobscured Best.

The missing portion of the photo was subsequently used on the cover of Best's 2008 album Haymans Green, an act described by one fan as "Pete Best's revenge".

== Reception ==
Professional ratings
Review scores
Source	Rating
AllMusic	3/5 stars
The Encyclopedia of Popular Music	4/5 stars
MusicHound	2/5
The Rolling Stone Album Guide	3/5 stars
Wall of Sound	84/100

The album was a large success throughout the world. It was the first Beatles album to enter the Billboard 200 album chart at number one. It sold 855,473 copies in its first week, the 27th largest one-week sales in the Soundscan history, succeeding Fresh Horses by Garth Brooks. In its second week, Anthology 1 sold 453,000 copies and maintained the top spot. This was repeated the following week, with 435,000 copies sold. In its fourth week, the same quantity was sold, but the album fell to number two, behind Mariah Carey's Daydream. In the following week, the album fell to number three but with 601,000 sales. Anthology 1 was certified 3× Platinum by the RIAA after six weeks in the US market. In all, the album spent 29 weeks on the Billboard 200, reaching cumulative sales of 3,639,000 sales as of April 2001. In the UK, reaction was similar, but the album peaked at number two, behind Robson & Jerome's eponymous album. In Australia, the album spent two weeks at number one in December 1995.

== Track listing ==
Spoken word tracks in italic.

All tracks in stereo, except spoken word tracks and where noted.

All tracks are written by Lennon–McCartney, except spoken word tracks and where noted.

Disc one
No.	Title	Writer(s)	Recording date and location	Length
1.	"Free as a Bird"	John Lennon; Paul McCartney; George Harrison; Ringo Starr	c. 1977; February–March 1994 in The Dakota, New York City, New York, US; Hogg Hill Mill, Icklesham, UK	4:25
2.	"We were four guys ... that's all" (Lennon speaking to Jann Wenner of Rolling Stone)		8 December 1970 in New York City	0:12
3.	"That'll Be the Day" (by the Quarrymen; mono)	Jerry Allison; Buddy Holly; Norman Petty	12 July 1958 in Phillips' Sound Recording Services, Liverpool, UK	2:08
4.	"In Spite of All the Danger" (by the Quarrymen; mono)	McCartney; Harrison	12 July 1958 in Phillips' Sound Recording Services	2:45
5.	"Sometimes I'd borrow ... those still exist" (McCartney speaking to Mark Lewisohn)		3 November 1994 in London, UK	0:18
6.	"Hallelujah, I Love Her So" (home demo; mono)	Ray Charles	1960 in 20 Forthlin Road, Liverpool	1:13
7.	"You'll Be Mine" (home demo; mono)		1960 in 20 Forthlin Road	1:39
8.	"Cayenne" (instrumental) (home demo; mono)	McCartney	1960 in 20 Forthlin Road	1:14
9.	"First of all ... it didn't do a thing here" (McCartney speaking to Malcolm Threadgill)		27 October 1962 in Hulme Hall, Port Sunlight, UK	0:07
10.	"My Bonnie" (by Tony Sheridan and the Beat Brothers)	trad. arr. Tony Sheridan	22 June 1961 in Friedrich-Ebert-Halle, Hamburg, Germany	2:42
11.	"Ain't She Sweet" (by the Beat Brothers)	Milton Ager; Jack Yellen	22 June 1961 in Friedrich-Ebert-Halle	2:13
12.	"Cry for a Shadow" (instrumental) (by the Beat Brothers)	Lennon; Harrison	22 June 1961 in Friedrich-Ebert-Halle	2:22
13.	"Brian was a beautiful guy ... he presented us well" (Lennon speaking to David Wigg for BBC Radio 1's Scene and Heard)		October 1971 in New York City	0:10
14.	"I secured them ... a Beatle drink even then" (Brian Epstein reading from A Cellarful of Noise)	Brian Epstein	13 October 1964 in EMI Studios, London	0:18
15.	"Searchin'" (Decca audition; mono)	Jerry Leiber; Mike Stoller	1 January 1962 in Decca Studios, London	3:00
16.	"Three Cool Cats" (Decca audition; mono)	Leiber; Stoller	1 January 1962 in Decca Studios	2:25
17.	"The Sheik of Araby" (Decca audition; mono)	Harry B. Smith; Francis Wheeler; Ted Snyder	1 January 1962 in Decca Studios	1:43
18.	"Like Dreamers Do" (Decca audition; mono)		1 January 1962 in Decca Studios	2:36
19.	"Hello Little Girl" (Decca audition; mono)		1 January 1962 in Decca Studios	1:40
20.	"Well, the recording test ... by my artists" (Epstein reading from A Cellarful of Noise)	Epstein	13 October 1964 in EMI Studios	0:32
21.	"Bésame Mucho" (mono)	Consuelo Velázquez; Sunny Skylar	6 June 1962 in EMI Studios	2:37
22.	"Love Me Do" (EMI audition/demo version with Pete Best on drums, mono)		6 June 1962 in EMI Studios	2:32
23.	"How Do You Do It?" (mono)	Mitch Murray	4 September 1962 in EMI Studios	1:57
24.	"Please Please Me" (mono)		11 September 1962 in EMI Studios	1:59
25.	"One After 909" (sequence) (takes 3, 4 & 5; mono)		5 March 1963 in EMI Studios	2:23
26.	"One After 909" (complete) (takes 4 & 5; mono)		5 March 1963 in EMI Studios	2:56
27.	"Lend Me Your Comb" (live at the BBC for Pop Go the Beatles; mono)	Kay Twomey; Fred Wise; Ben Weisman	2 July 1963 in Maida Vale Studios, London	1:50
28.	"I'll Get You" (live on Sunday Night at the London Palladium; mono)		13 October 1963 in The London Palladium, London	2:08
29.	"We were performers ... in Britain" (Lennon speaking to Wenner)		8 December 1970 in New York City	0:12
30.	"I Saw Her Standing There" (live for The Beatles, Pop Group from Liverpool Visiting Stockholm; mono)		24 October 1963 in The Karlaplansstudion, Stockholm, Sweden	2:49
31.	"From Me to You" (live for The Beatles, Pop Group from Liverpool Visiting Stockholm; mono)		24 October 1963 in The Karlaplansstudion	2:05
32.	"Money (That's What I Want)" (live for The Beatles, Pop Group from Liverpool Visiting Stockholm; mono)	Janie Bradford; Berry Gordy	24 October 1963 in The Karlaplansstudion	2:52
33.	"You Really Got a Hold on Me" (live for The Beatles, Pop Group from Liverpool Visiting Stockholm; mono)	Smokey Robinson	24 October 1963 in The Karlaplansstudion	2:58
34.	"Roll Over Beethoven" (live for The Beatles, Pop Group from Liverpool Visiting Stockholm; mono)	Chuck Berry	24 October 1963 in The Karlaplansstudion	2:22
Total length:				65:22

Disc two
No.	Title	Writer(s)	Recording date and location	Length
1.	"She Loves You" (live on the Royal Variety Performance; mono)		4 November 1963 in The Prince of Wales Theatre, London	2:50
2.	"Till There Was You" (live on the Royal Variety Performance; mono)	Meredith Willson	4 November 1963 in The Prince of Wales Theatre	2:54
3.	"Twist and Shout" (live on the Royal Variety Performance; mono)	Bert Russell; Phil Medley	4 November 1963 in The Prince of Wales Theatre	3:05
4.	"This Boy" (live on Two of a Kind; mono)		2 December 1963 in ATV Studios, London	2:22
5.	"I Want to Hold Your Hand" (live on Two of a Kind; mono)		2 December 1963 in ATV Studios	2:37
6.	"Boys, what I was thinking..." (Eric Morecambe and Ernie Wise speaking to the Beatles live on Two of a Kind)		2 December 1963 in ATV Studios	2:06
7.	"Moonlight Bay" (live on Two of a Kind; mono)	Edward Madden; Percy Wenrich	2 December 1963 in ATV Studios	0:50
8.	"Can't Buy Me Love" (takes 1 & 2)		29 January 1964 in Pathé Marconi, Paris, France	2:10
9.	"All My Loving" (live on The Ed Sullivan Show; mono)		9 February 1964 in CBS-TV Studio 50, New York City	2:19
10.	"You Can't Do That" (take 6)		25 February 1964 in EMI Studios	2:42
11.	"And I Love Her" (take 2)		25 February 1964 in EMI Studios	1:52
12.	"A Hard Day's Night" (take 1)		16 April 1964 in EMI Studios	2:44
13.	"I Wanna Be Your Man" (live for Around the Beatles)		19 April 1964 in IBC Studios, London	1:48
14.	"Long Tall Sally" (live for Around the Beatles)	Enotris Johnson; Richard Penniman; Robert Blackwell	19 April 1964 in IBC Studios	1:45
15.	"Boys" (live for Around the Beatles)	Luther Dixon; Wes Farrell	19 April 1964 in IBC Studios	1:50
16.	"Shout" (live for Around the Beatles)	Rudolph Isley; Ronald Isley; O'Kelly Isley Jr	19 April 1964 in IBC Studios	1:31
17.	"I'll Be Back" (take 2)		1 June 1964 in EMI Studios	1:13
18.	"I'll Be Back" (take 3)		1 June 1964 in EMI Studios	1:58
19.	"You Know What to Do" (demo)	Harrison	3 June 1964 in EMI Studios	1:59
20.	"No Reply" (demo)		3 June 1964 in EMI Studios	1:46
21.	"Mr. Moonlight" (takes 1 & 4)	Roy Lee Johnson	14 August 1964 in EMI Studios	2:47
22.	"Leave My Kitten Alone" (take 5)	Little Willie John; Titus Turner; James McDougal	14 August 1964 in EMI Studios	2:57
23.	"No Reply" (take 2)		30 September 1964 in EMI Studios	2:29
24.	"Eight Days a Week" (sequence) (takes 1, 2 & 4)		6 October 1964 in EMI Studios	1:25
25.	"Eight Days a Week" (complete) (take 5)		6 October 1964 in EMI Studios	2:48
26.	"Kansas City / Hey-Hey-Hey-Hey!" (take 2)	Leiber; Stoller / Penniman	18 October 1964 in EMI Studios	2:44
Total length:				57:31

== Charts ==
=== Weekly charts ===
Weekly chart performance for Anthology 1
Chart (1995–96)	Peak position
Australian Albums (ARIA)	1
Australian Albums (ARIA)	4
Belgian Albums (Ultratop Flanders)	2
Belgian Albums (Ultratop Wallonia)	2
Canada Top Albums/CDs (RPM)	1
Dutch Albums (Album Top 100)	1
Finnish Albums (Suomen virallinen lista)	2
French Albums (SNEP)	1
German Albums (Offizielle Top 100)	1
Hungarian Albums (MAHASZ)	20
Italian Albums (FIMI)	2
Japanese Albums (Oricon)	3
New Zealand Albums (RMNZ)	1
Norwegian Albums (VG-lista)	5
Swedish Albums (Sverigetopplistan)	2
Swiss Albums (Schweizer Hitparade)	2
UK Albums (Official Charts)	2
US Billboard 200	1

=== Year-end charts ===
1995 year-end chart performance for Anthology 1
Chart (1995)	Position
Australian Albums Chart	18
Belgian Albums Chart (Flanders)	37
Belgian Albums Chart (Wallonia)	32
Canadian Albums Chart	17

1996 year-end chart performance for Anthology 1
Chart (1996)	Position
Canadian Albums Chart	32
German Albums Chart	98
Japanese Albums Chart	41
US Billboard 200	8

== Certifications and sales ==
Certifications and sales for Anthology 1
Region	Certification	Certified units/sales
Argentina	—	30,000
Australia (ARIA)	2× Platinum	140,000^{^}
Austria (IFPI Austria)	Gold	25,000^{*}
Belgium (BRMA)	Platinum	50,000^{*}
Brazil	—	122,000
Canada (Music Canada)	9× Platinum	900,000^{^}
Germany (BVMI)	Gold	250,000^{^}
Japan (RIAJ)	2× Platinum	607,000
Netherlands (NVPI)	Gold	50,000^{^}
Norway (IFPI Norway)	Gold	25,000^{*}
Poland (ZPAV)	Gold	50,000^{*}
Spain (Promusicae)	Platinum	100,000^{^}
Sweden (GLF)	Gold	50,000^{^}
Switzerland (IFPI Switzerland)	Platinum	50,000^{^}
United Kingdom (BPI)	2× Platinum	600,000^{^}
United States (RIAA)	8× Platinum	4,000,000^{^}
Summaries
Europe (IFPI)	2× Platinum	2,000,000^{*}
Worldwide	—	10,000,000
^{*} Sales figures based on certification alone.^{^} Shipments figures based on certification alone.

== Personnel ==
The Beatles

- John Lennon – vocals, rhythm guitar, harmonica, piano on "Free as a Bird"
- Paul McCartney – vocals, bass guitar, rhythm guitar; synthesizer and piano on "Free as a Bird"
- George Harrison – harmony and backing vocals, lead guitar; ukulele and slide guitar on "Free as a Bird", lead vocals on "Roll Over Beethoven", "Three Cool Cats", "The Sheik of Araby" and "You Know What to Do"
- Ringo Starr – drums, percussion, lead vocals on "I Wanna Be Your Man" and "Boys"
- Pete Best – drums on "My Bonnie", "Ain't She Sweet", "Cry for a Shadow", "Searchin'", "Three Cool Cats", "The Sheik of Araby", "Like Dreamers Do", "Hello Little Girl", "Bésame Mucho", and "Love Me Do"
- Stuart Sutcliffe – bass guitar on "Hallelujah, I Love Her So", "You'll Be Mine", and "Cayenne"

Additional musicians

- Colin Hanton – drums on "That'll Be the Day" and "In Spite of All the Danger"
- John Lowe – piano on "That'll Be the Day" and "In Spite of All the Danger"
- Tony Sheridan – lead vocal and lead guitar (guitar solo) on "My Bonnie"
- Andy White – drums on "Please Please Me"
- Jeff Lynne – backing vocals and electric guitar on "Free as a Bird"

== See also ==
- Outline of the Beatles
- The Beatles timeline
