= The Beatles Tapes from the David Wigg Interviews =

Live album spoken word by the Beatles
- Released: 30 July 1976
- Recorded: 1968–1973
- Genre: Interview
- Label: Polydor

The Beatles interview album chronology
The Beatles' Story (1964)	The Beatles Tapes from the David Wigg Interviews (1976)	Love (interview disc) (2006)

The Beatles Tapes from the David Wigg Interviews is an audio album of interviews with each of the four members of the Beatles: John Lennon (with his second wife, Yoko Ono), Paul McCartney, George Harrison and Ringo Starr. British journalist David Wigg interviewed the Beatles individually at various points from December 1968 or January 1969 to December 1973, and excerpts from some of these recordings constitute the album's spoken words. Although he was a columnist ("Young London") for the London newspaper The Evening News, most of the interviews were recorded for the BBC Radio 1 series Scene and Heard. Interspersed among the interview excerpts are instrumental performances of Beatles songs played by other musicians. The Beatles tried to prevent the album's publication, but it was released in the United Kingdom on 30 July 1976 under the Polydor label (catalogue number 2683 068) and in the United States in 1978. Both George and Ringo did attempt to sue the Recording label, however, both of them lost the case because the interviews were done on public radio on the BBC.

== Topics ==
Major topics in John Lennon's interview include his relationship with Yoko Ono, his peace activism, The Beatles' business affairs (a portion of his statement about Brian Epstein's management is on Anthology 1), the nature of God, and the band's break-up and whether they would reunite musically.

Among Paul McCartney's topics are fatherhood, his favourite songs from Abbey Road, why The Beatles appeared at only one Royal Variety Performance, and the composition of "Golden Slumbers". Shortly after his interview, McCartney met with the other Beatles to decide whether Allen Klein or Lee Eastman would handle the group's affairs. Having failed to persuade the other Beatles to choose Eastman, McCartney "stormed out of the meeting, resigning from the Apple board".

George Harrison discusses the spiritual side of his life, including his seeming destiny to be a Beatle, Hare Krishna, meditation, drug use, and whether it is possible for The Beatles to split up. He also discusses business—the British government's anti-monopoly policies and high taxation, and the difference in radio offerings between the United Kingdom and the United States—and his Abbey Road favourites.

Ringo Starr's first interview took place while he was heading to a medical examination required for insurance in anticipation of his work in The Magic Christian. Starr discusses The Beatles' feelings for one another, the band's break-up, how he has spent his money, the ups and downs of fame (such as being photographed and asked for autographs), reincarnation ("I'd like to come back as one of our cats: they have a great time! But it's not possible: I'll be back here as a human, struggling again, trying to remember what I forgot last time"), and vegetarianism.

== Track listing ==
The following describes the compact-disc version of the album (Polydor 42284 7185-2):

Disc One (Polydor 42284 7186-2)

1. Interview of John Lennon with Yoko Ono: Apple Corps offices, 3 Savile Row, London, 8 May 1969 or June 1969: Part 1. 3:34.
2. "Give Peace a Chance". 1:00.
3. Interview of John Lennon with Yoko Ono: Apple Corps offices, 3 Savile Row, London, June 1969: Part 2. 8:42.
4. "Imagine". 1:12.
5. Interview of John Lennon with Yoko Ono: Apple Corps offices, 3 Savile Row, London, June 1969 or between October 21, 1969-February 6, 1970: Part 3. 8:15.
6. "Come Together". 0:54.
7. Interview of John Lennon with Yoko Ono: St. Regis New York, 2 East 55th Street, Manhattan, New York City, October 1971. 9:28.
8. Interview of Paul McCartney: Apple Corps offices, 3 Savile Row, London, March 1970 or September 19, 1969: Part 1. 1:29.
9. "Because". 1:37.
10. Interview of Paul McCartney: Apple Corps offices, 3 Savile Row, London, March 1970: Part 2. 10:24.
11. "Yesterday". 1:24.
12. Interview of Paul McCartney: Apple Corps offices, 3 Savile Row, London, March 1970: Part 3. 1:33.
13. "Hey Jude". 2:47.

Disc Two (Polydor 42284 7187-2)

1. Interview of George Harrison: Apple Corps offices, 3 Savile Row, London, 4 March 1969 or October 8, 1969: Part 1. 14:24.
2. "Here Comes the Sun". 1:09.
3. Interview of George Harrison: Apple Corps offices, 3 Savile Row, London, 4 March 1969: Part 2. 5:31.
4. "Something". 1:35.
5. Interview of Ringo Starr: moving chauffeur-driven Mercedes en route from Starr's home in Elstead, Surrey, to a medical exam in London, December 1968 or 21 January 1969: 3:30.
6. Interview of Ringo Starr: London, 20 March 1970, 25 March, or July 1970: 6:42.
7. Interview of Ringo Starr: Apple Corps offices, 3 Savile Row, London, December 1973 or January 3, 1973: Part 1. 4:47.
8. "Octopus's Garden". 1:08.
9. Interview of Ringo Starr: Apple Corps offices, 3 Savile Row, London, December 1973: Part 2. 3:40.
10. "Yellow Submarine". 0:59.

During some of the interviews, background sounds are audible.

== Credits ==
David Wigg conducted and edited the interviews, with engineering by Peter Wilson.

The songs are played by Gavyn Wright and Irvine Arditti (violins); Jan Schlapp (viola); Helen Liebmann (cello); Janice Knight (oboe); Crispian Steele-Perkins and Paul Cash (trumpets); Carlos Bonell and Tom Hartmann (guitars); Francis Monkman (ARP Odyssey Synthesiser); Ann Odell (piano); and Graham Smith (harmonica). Martyn Ford and John Bell arranged the music from compositions by The Beatles. Ford also conducted the performances and produced the recordings.
