= William Faulkes =

English musician (1863–1933)

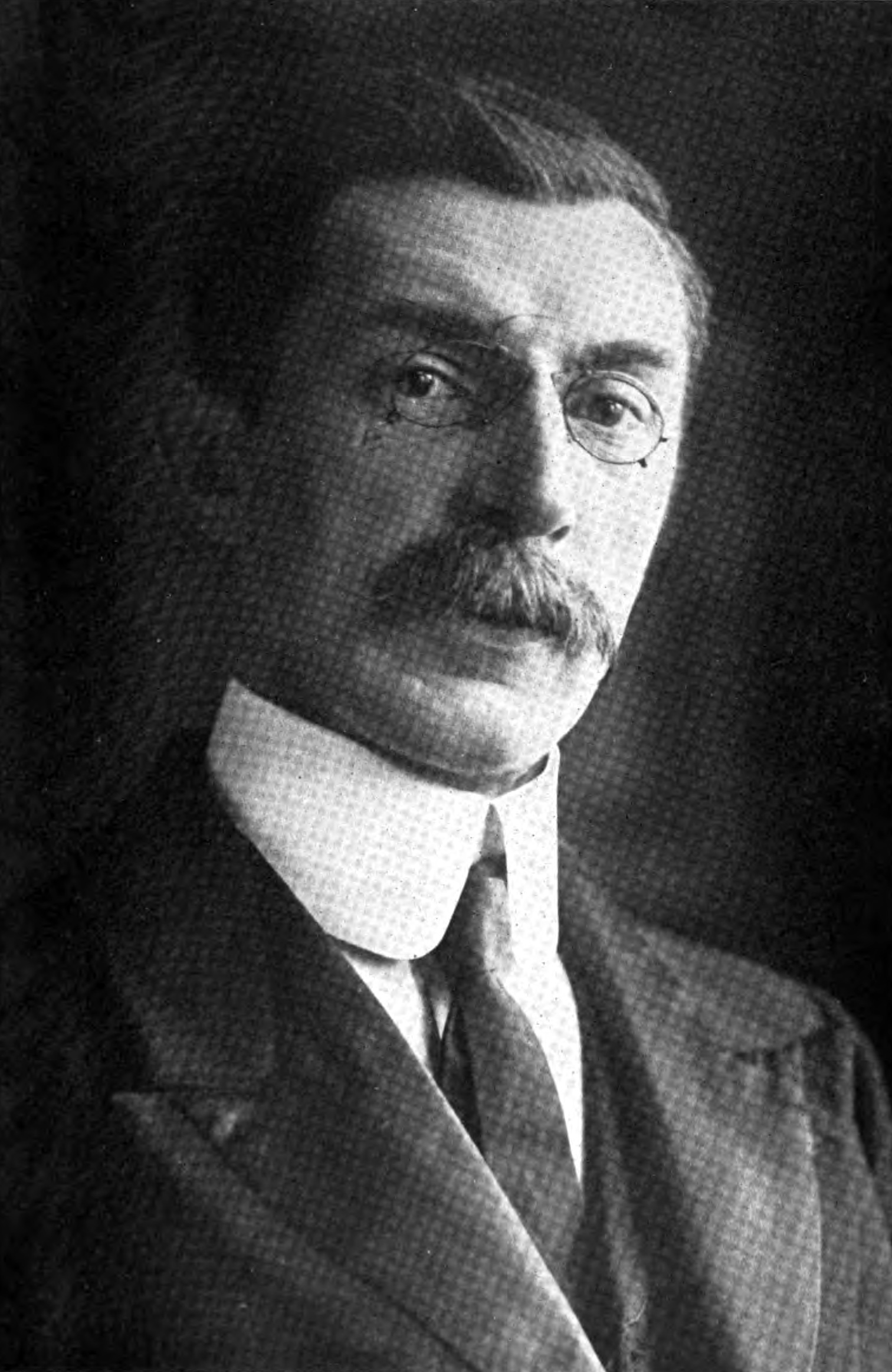
- Born: George William Henry Faulkes; November 4, 1863; Liverpool, England
- Died: January 25, 1933 (aged 69); Liverpool, England
- Occupations: Organist; Composer

George William Henry Faulkes (1863–1933) – known professionally as William Faulkes – was an English musician now best known as the composer of organ music.

== Early life ==
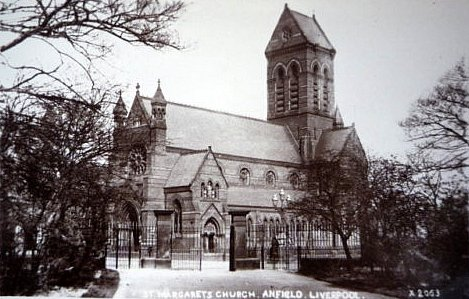
St Margaret's Anfield c.1910.

Faulkes was a native of Liverpool, where he spent most of his working life. His early general education was under the aegis of his mother and older sister assisted by William Dawson, another Liverpool organist. At the age of 10 William joined the choir of St Margaret's church, Anfield, and his music education continued under the church's organist Henry Ditton Newman.

== Church organist ==
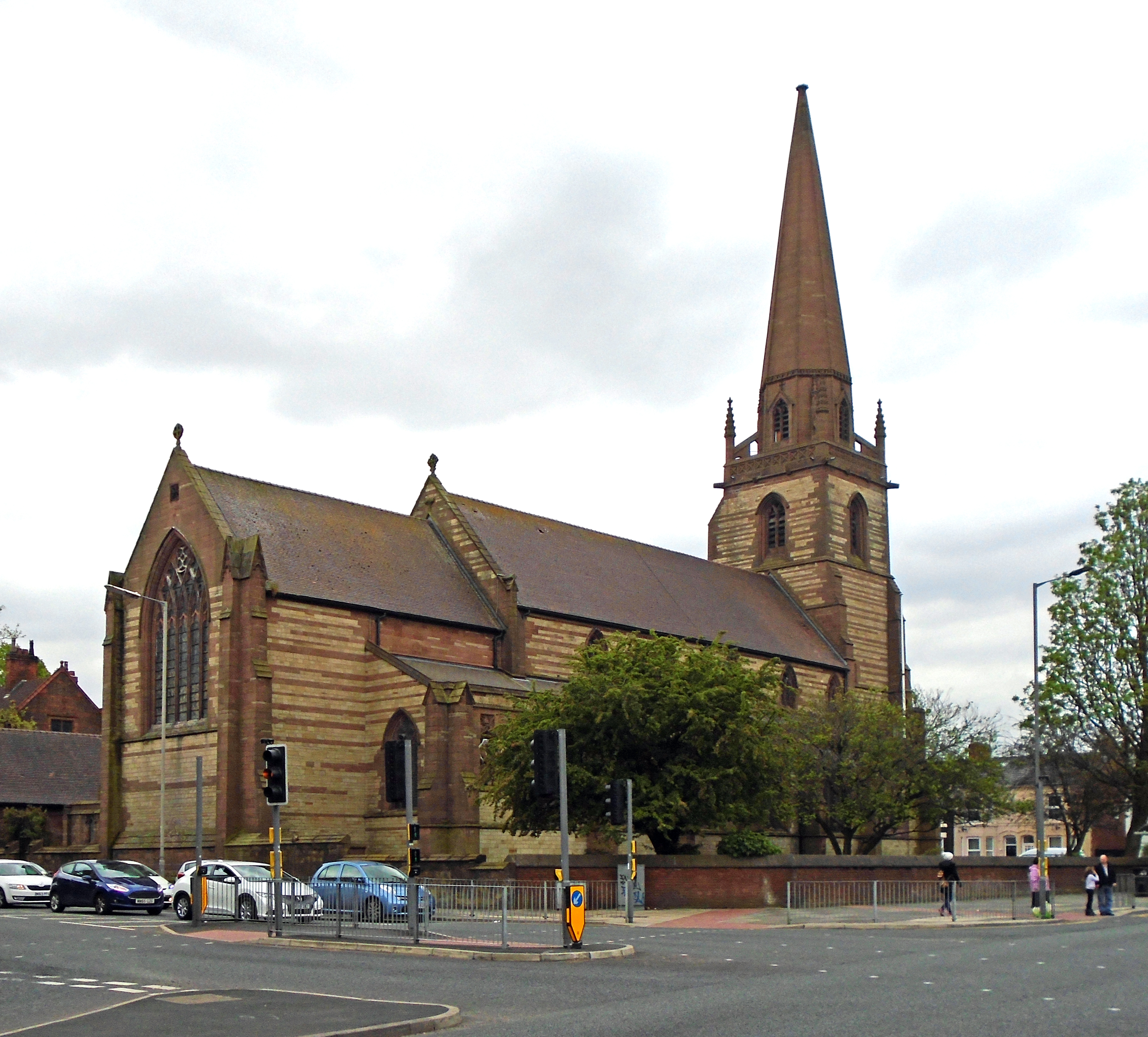
St John the Baptist, Tuebrook in 2017.

Faulkes's first appointment as church organist was at St John the Baptist Tuebrook (1881–86). He then returned to St Margaret's Anfield as organist in 1886, where he remained in post until his death.

== Orchestral conductor ==
He was conductor of the Anfield Orchestral Society from 1908.

== Compositions ==
Faulkes published over 500 organ works, for which he is best known. He also composed choral music, songs, and chamber and orchestral works.

== Recording artist ==
Such was his reputation that before and after the Great War Faulkes journeyed several times to Germany to record player rolls for the Welte Company. These rolls survive in the Seewen Museum of Music Automatons in Switzerland. Some have been recorded on CD.

== Further resources ==
- CD:William Faulkes (1863–1933): An Edwardian concert with England’s organ composer, performed by Duncan Ferguson.
- CD: 'William Faulkes: Rhapsodie on Old French Carols'. Die Welte-Philharmonie-Orgel/The Britannic Organ.
- CD: 'William Faulkes: Festmarsch (Festival March) Op. 128 No. 1'. Die Welte-Philharmonie-Orgel/The Britannic Organ.
- Public-domain sheet music by William Faulkes at IMSLP Petrucci Music Library.
- Details of works published by William Failkes and available in UK libraries can be found at Jisc Library Hub Discover
- William Faulkes. Idylll (1902). Andrew Pink (2021) Exordia ad missam.
