= Simon Fisher (priest) =

British Anglican priest

Simon John Plumley Fisher is a British Anglican priest currently serving as Archdeacon of St Helens and Warrington.

== Biography ==
Fisher was born in 1980. He studied at St John's College Durham, graduating with a Bachelor of Arts (BA) degree in 2001. He then trained for ordination at Ripon College Cuddesdon, graduating with a further BA in 2004.

Fisher was ordained in the Church of England as a deacon in 2005 and as a priest in 2006. He served his curacy in the benefice of Bathwick in the Diocese of Bath and Wells from 2005 to 2009. He was vicar of St John the Baptist, Tuebrook, Liverpool. Fisher was announced as Archdeacon-designate in October 2019, and collated on 25 January 2020.
