= You'll Be Mine (Beatles song) =

Song by the Beatles (then known as the Quarrymen)

from the album Anthology 1
- Released: 20 November 1995
- Recorded: Spring/summer 1960
- Studio: 20 Forthlin Road, Liverpool
- Genre: Rhythm and blues, parody, vocal jazz
- Length: 1:38
- Songwriter: Lennon–McCartney

"You'll Be Mine" is a song composed by Lennon–McCartney in the Beatles' early years, then known as the Quarrymen. It was a humorous parody of vocal jazz group the Ink Spots. It consists of Paul McCartney singing in a deep baritone, offset with shrill falsetto backing vocals by John Lennon, and guitar strumming. The lead vocal sings, in rather confused lyrics, about his determination of making a woman his; while the falsettos wail the last word of each sentence. About halfway through the song, Lennon gives a mock-bass voice spoken interlude about how, when the woman brought him toast one morning, he looked into her eyes and saw a "national health eyeball", then proceeded to love her like he has never done before. The song rises to a crescendo of wailing and bellowing, then fades out in laughter. To add to the confusion, the song is very difficult to understand; clicks, buzzes, fuzz, giggling, and the baritone voice obscure the lyrics.

Recorded in the McCartney family bathroom in 1960, it is the earliest recording attributed to the Lennon–McCartney songwriting partnership to be officially released. Along with the other songs recorded on that day, it is one of the few known Beatles recordings to feature Stuart Sutcliffe on bass.

== Personnel ==
- Paul McCartney – lead vocal, guitar
- John Lennon – backing and spoken vocals, guitar
- George Harrison – guitar
- Stuart Sutcliffe – bass

Personnel per Mark Lewisohn
