= Tony Flynn =

American songwriter

- Genres: Hard rock, Heavy metal, Blues-rock, Rock and roll
- Occupation: Musician
- Instrument: Guitar

Tony Flynn is an American rock guitarist best known for his stints with Steppenwolf and an unauthorized 1980 "reunion" of Deep Purple. He was originally hired to play with Steppenwolf in 1977 to fill in for Kent Henry, and found himself called upon multiple times until 1980, at which point John Kay and Jerry Edmonton won back the exclusive rights to the Steppenwolf name. Shortly thereafter, Flynn joined the "new" Deep Purple, which included original singer Rod Evans (who had left the band a decade before) and a lineup of replacement players which included Flynn's former Steppenwolf bandmates Geoff Emery (keyboards) and Dick Jurgens (drums). Later that year, after the group had played a string of poorly received concerts, former Purple guitarist Ritchie Blackmore, along with managers Tony Edwards, John Coletta and Bruce Payne sued Evans and won both $672,000 in damages and a permanent injunction against Evans and his cohorts using the name "Deep Purple," ending Flynn's association with the band.

Tony Flynn currently splits residency between Northern and Southern Mexico where has lived since the mid-1980s. He occasionally plays solo shows and is often a guest at local Rock/Heavy Metal bars.
