= Pete Best =

British musician (born 1941)

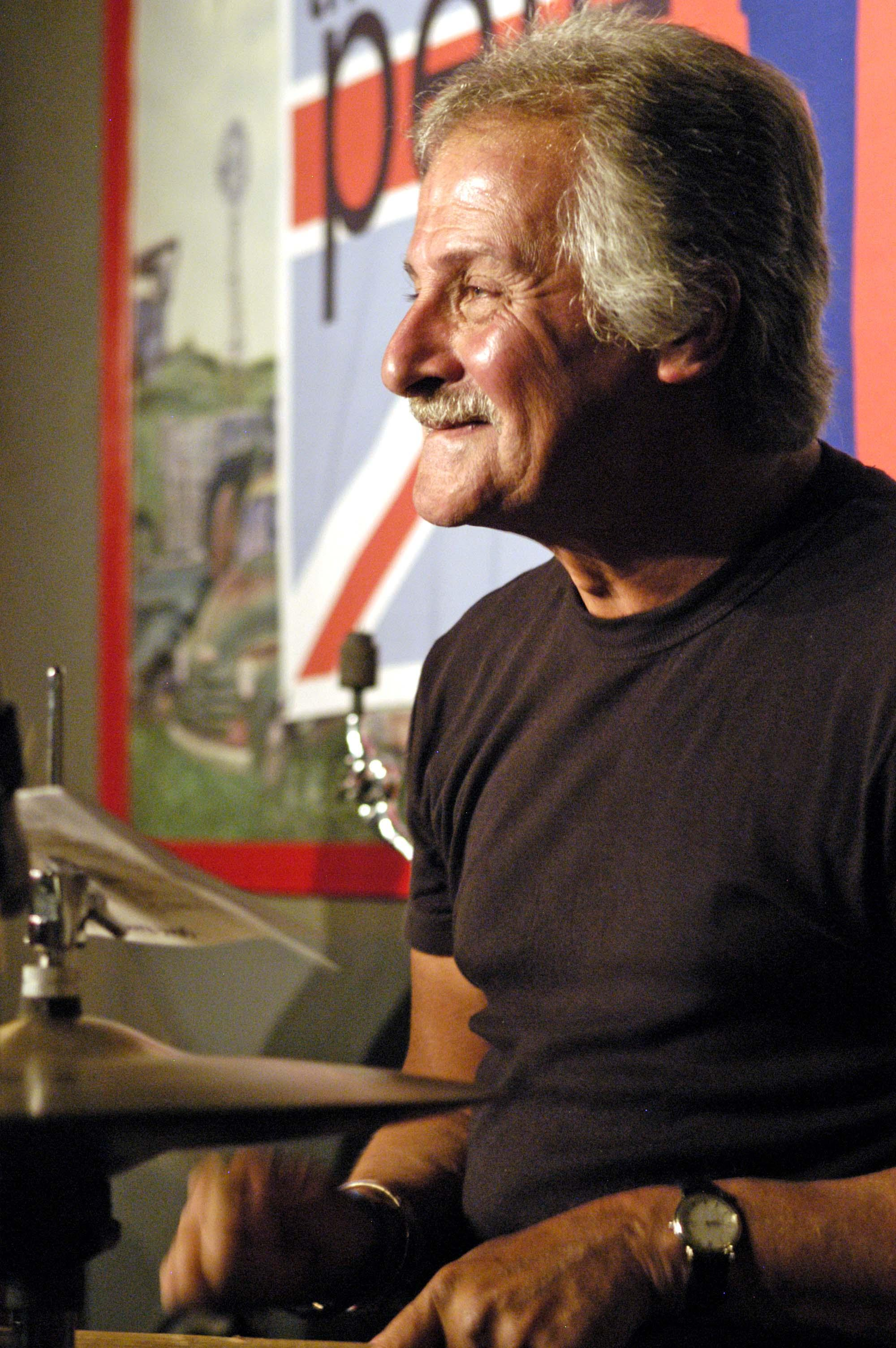
- Best performing in 2006
- Born: Randolph Peter Best; 24 November 1941 (age 84); Madras, British India
- Occupations: Musician; singer; songwriter
- Years active: 1959–1968; 1988–2025
- Musical career
- Genres: Rock; rock and roll
- Instruments: Drums; vocals
- Formerly of: The Beatles; Lee Curtis and the All-Stars; Pete Best & the All-Stars; The Pete Best Four; The Pete Best Combo; The Pete Best Band
- Website: petebest.com

Randolph Peter Best (né Scanland; born 24 November 1941) is a British retired musician who was the drummer for the Beatles from 1960 to 1962. He was dismissed shortly before the band attained global fame and is one of several people referred to as a fifth Beatle.

Best's mother, Mona Best (1924–1988), opened the Casbah Coffee Club in the cellar of the Bests' house in Liverpool. The Beatles (at the time known as the Quarrymen) played some of their first concerts at the club. The Beatles invited Best to join the band on 12 August 1960, on the eve of the group's first Hamburg season of club dates. Ringo Starr replaced Best on 16 August 1962 when the group's manager, Brian Epstein, fired Best at the request of John Lennon, Paul McCartney, and George Harrison following the band's first recording session. Over 30 years later, Best received a significant monetary payout for his work with the Beatles after the release of their 1995 compilation of their early recordings on Anthology 1; Best played the drums on 10 of the album's tracks, including the Decca auditions.

After six years of being a member of several commercially unsuccessful groups, Best left the music industry to pursue a career as a civil servant for 20 years before forming the Pete Best Band, active from 1988 until 2025.

== Early life ==
Best's mother, Mona Best, was born in Delhi, India, the daughter of Thomas (a major from Ireland) and Mary Shaw. Pete Best, her first child, was born on 24 November 1941 in Madras, then part of British India. Best's biological father was marine engineer Donald Peter Scanland, who subsequently died during World War II. Best's mother was training to become a doctor in the service of the Red Cross when she met Johnny Best, who came from a family of sports promoters in Liverpool who ran Liverpool Stadium, a boxing arena. During World War II, Johnny Best was a commissioned officer serving as a Physical Training Instructor in India and was the Army's middleweight boxing champion. Soon after their marriage on 7 March 1944 at St Thomas's Cathedral, Bombay, Rory Best was born. In 1945, the Best family sailed for four weeks to Liverpool on the Georgic, the last troop ship to leave India, carrying single and married soldiers who had previously been a part of General William Slim's forces in south-east Asia. The ship docked in Liverpool on 25 December 1945.

Best's family lived for a short time at the family home, "Ellerslie" in West Derby until Best's mother fell out with her sister-in-law, Edna, who resented her brother's choice of wife. The family then moved to a small flat on Cases Street, Liverpool, but Mona Best was always looking for a large house—as she had been used to in India—instead of one of the smaller semi-detached houses prevalent in the area. The Bests moved to 17 Queenscourt Road in 1948 and remained there for nine years.

Best passed the eleven plus exam at Blackmoor Park primary school in West Derby and was studying at the Liverpool Collegiate Grammar School in Shaw Street when he decided he wanted to be in a music group. Mona bought him a drum kit from Blackler's music store, and Best formed his own band, the Black Jacks.

In 1957, Rory Best saw a large Victorian house for sale at 8 Hayman's Green and told Mona about it. The Best family claim that Mona had pawned all her jewellery to place a bet on Never Say Die, a horse that was ridden by Lester Piggott in the 1954 Epsom Derby; it won at 33–1, and she saved her winnings and in 1957 used them to buy the house. The house, built around 1860, had previously been owned by the West Derby Conservative Club and was unlike many other family houses in Liverpool as it was set back from the road and had 15 bedrooms and an acre of land. All the rooms were painted dark green or brown, and the large garden was totally overgrown. Mona later opened The Casbah Coffee Club in the house's large cellar. The idea for the club first came from Best, as he asked his mother for somewhere his friends could meet and listen to the popular music of the day. As The Quarrymen, John Lennon, Paul McCartney, George Harrison, and Ken Brown played at the club after helping Mona to finish painting the walls. Chas Newby and Bill Barlow joined the Black Jacks, as did Ken Brown, but only after he had left the Quarrymen. The Black Jacks later became the resident group at the Casbah, after the Quarrymen cancelled their residency because of an argument about money.

In 1960, Neil Aspinall became good friends with the young Best and rented a room in the Bests' house. During one of the extended business trips of Best's stepfather, Aspinall became romantically involved with Mona and in 1962, a son, Vincent Roag Best, was born to Aspinall and Mona. Aspinall later became the Beatles' road manager and denied the story for years before publicly admitting that Roag was indeed his son.

== The Beatles ==
In 1960, Beatles' manager Allan Williams arranged a season of bookings in Hamburg, beginning on 17 August 1960, but complained the group did not impress him and hoped that he could find a better act.

Having no permanent drummer, Paul McCartney looked for someone to fill the Hamburg position. Best had been seen playing in the Casbah with his own group, the Black Jacks, and it was observed that he played the bass drum on all four beats in the bar, which pushed the rhythm. In Liverpool, his female fans knew him as being "mean, moody, and magnificent", which convinced McCartney he would be suitable for the group. After the Black Jacks broke up, McCartney persuaded Best to go to Hamburg with the band, by saying they would each earn £15 per week (equivalent to £300 in 2025). As Best had passed his school exams (unlike Lennon, McCartney and Harrison, who had failed most of theirs), he had the chance to attend teacher-training college, but he decided that playing in Hamburg would be a better career move. Best had an audition in the Jacaranda Club, which Williams owned, and travelled to Hamburg the next day. Williams later said that the audition with Best was unnecessary, as the group had not found any other drummer willing to travel to Hamburg, but did not tell Best in case he asked for more money.

On their first trip to Hamburg, the group soon realised that the stage suits they wore could not withstand the hours of sweating and jumping about on stage every night, so they all bought leather jackets, jeans and cowboy boots, which were much tougher. Best initially preferred to play in cooler short sleeves on stage, which did not match the sartorial style of the group, even though he was later photographed wearing a leather jacket and jeans. Lennon, McCartney, Harrison and Stuart Sutcliffe were introduced to recreational drugs in Hamburg. As they played for hours every night, they often took Preludin to keep themselves awake, which they received from German customers or Astrid Kirchherr, whose mother bought them. Lennon often took four or five, but Best always refused.

The Beatles first played a complete show with Best on 17 August 1960 at the Indra Club in Hamburg, and the group slept in the Bambi Kino cinema in a small, dirty room with bunk beds, a cold and noisy former storeroom directly behind the screen. Upon first seeing the Indra, where they were booked to play, Best remembered it as a depressing place patronised by a few tourists and having heavy, old, red curtains that made it seem shabby compared to the larger Kaiserkeller. As Best had been the only group member to study O-Level German at school, he could converse with the club's owner, Bruno Koschmider, and the clientele. After the Indra closed following complaints about the noise, the group started a residency in the Kaiserkeller.

In October 1960, the group left Koschmider's club to work at the Top Ten Club, which Peter Eckhorn ran, as he offered the group more money and a slightly better place to sleep. In doing so, they broke their contract with Koschmider. When Best and McCartney returned to the Bambi Kino to retrieve their belongings, they found it in almost total darkness. As a snub to Koschmider, McCartney found a condom, attached it to a nail on the concrete wall of the room, and set it alight. No real damage was done, but Koschmider reported them both for attempted arson. Best and McCartney spent three hours in a local prison and were subsequently deported on 30 November 1960, as was George Harrison, for working under the legal age limit.

Upon the band's return from Hamburg in December 1960, Neil Aspinall hand-painted the first physical "The Beatles" logo on a 22-inch bass drum skin for Best's drum kit. However, the skin was never used in performance as it did not fit Best's 20-inch Premier bass drum. The artifact remained undiscovered for over 25 years until it was found by his brother, Roag Best, and is now displayed at the Liverpool Beatles Museum.

Back in Liverpool, the group members had no contact with each other for two weeks, but Best and his mother made numerous phone calls to Hamburg to recover the group's equipment. In late 1961, Mona arranged all the bookings for the group in Liverpool after they parted company with Williams.

Chas Newby, the ex-Black Jacks guitarist, was invited to play bass for four concerts, as bassist Stuart Sutcliffe had decided to stay in Hamburg. Newby played with the group at Litherland Town Hall and at the Casbah. He was shocked at the vast improvement in their playing and singing and remembered Best's drumming to be very powerful, which pushed the group to play harder and louder. It was probably thanks to McCartney that Best developed a loud drumming style, as he often told Best in Hamburg to "crank it up" (play as loud as possible). When the group returned to Hamburg, by which time McCartney had switched to bass, Best was asked to sing a speciality number written by McCartney, "Pinwheel Twist", while McCartney played drums.

=== "My Bonnie" ===
The reunited Beatles returned to Hamburg in April 1961. While they played at the Top Ten Club, singer Tony Sheridan recruited them to act as his backing band on a recording for the German Polydor label, produced by bandleader Bert Kaempfert, who signed the group to a Polydor contract at the first session on 22 June 1961. On 31 October 1961, Polydor released the recording "My Bonnie" (Mein Herz ist bei dir nur / My heart is only for you), which appeared on the German charts under the name "Tony Sheridan and the Beat Brothers"—a generic name used for whoever happened to be in Sheridan's backup band. The song was later released in the UK. There was a second recording session on 23 June that year and a third in May 1962.

=== Decca and Parlophone ===
Brian Epstein, who had been unofficially managing the Beatles for less than a month, arranged a recording audition at Decca Records in London on New Year's Day 1962. The group recorded 15 songs, mostly cover versions, plus three Lennon–McCartney songs. A month later, Decca informed Epstein the group had been rejected. All band members except for Best were informed of the rejection. Epstein officially became the Beatles' manager on 24 January 1962, with the contract signed in Best's house.

Epstein negotiated ownership of the Decca audition tape, which he transferred to an acetate disc, to promote the band to other record companies in London. In the meantime, Epstein negotiated the release of the Beatles from their recording contract with Bert Kaempfert and Polydor Records in Germany, which expired on 22 June 1962. As a part of this contract, the Beatles recorded at Polydor's Studio Rahlstedt on 24 May 1962 in Hamburg as a sessions band, backing Tony Sheridan.

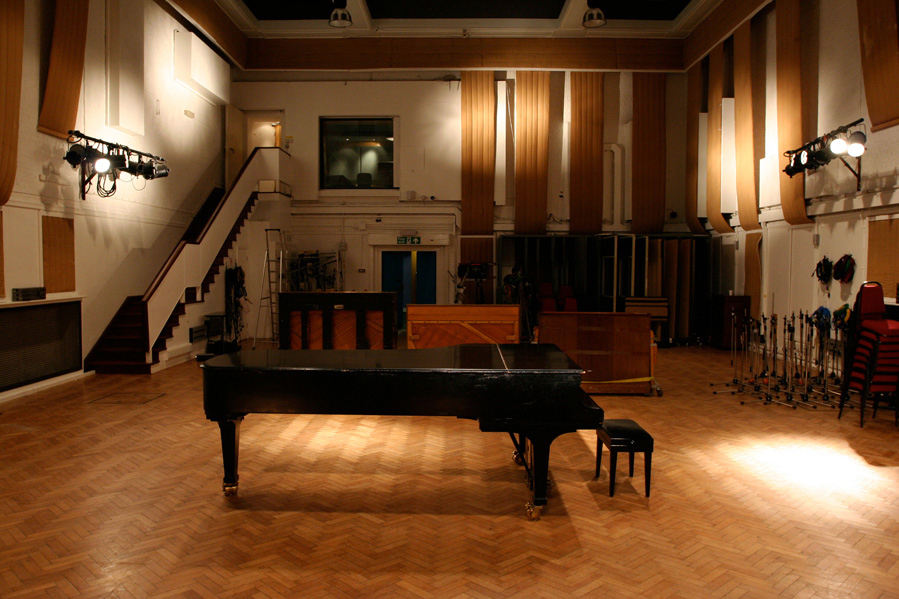
Studio Two of Abbey Road Studios (in 2008) where Pete Best recorded with the Beatles in a test session on 6 June 1962

The record producer at EMI, George Martin, met Epstein on 9 May 1962 at the Abbey Road studios, and was impressed with his enthusiasm. He agreed to sign the Beatles on a recording contract, based on listening to the Decca audition tape, without having met or seen them perform live. Soon after the recording contract was signed, the Beatles performed a "commercial test" (i.e. an evaluation of a signed artist) on 6 June 1962 in Studio Two at the Abbey Road studios. The Beatles were not new to studio recording, and Best's drumming had been found acceptable by Polydor in Hamburg. However, Martin was alerted to Best's unsuitability for British studio work. EMI engineer Norman Smith stated in a 2006 video interview that "it was mainly down to what he was playing and not how he was playing," when "Love Me Do" was first recorded, referring to the head arrangement. Martin, however, found Best's timing inadequate and wanted to replace Best with an experienced studio session drummer for the recordings, a common practice at the time.

Martin stated years later:

I decided that the drums, which are really the backbone of a good rock group, didn't give the boys enough support. They needed a good solid beat, and I said to Brian, 'Look, it doesn't matter what you do with the boys, but on record, nobody need know. I'm gonna use a hot drummer.' Brian [Epstein] said, 'Okay, fine.' I felt guilty because I felt maybe I was the catalyst that had changed his [Best's] life…

=== Dismissal ===
When Lennon, McCartney, and Harrison learned that Martin and the engineers preferred replacing Best with a session drummer for their upcoming recording session on 4 September 1962, they considered dismissing Best from the group. Eventually, they asked Epstein to handle this. Epstein agonised over the decision. As he wrote in his autobiography, A Cellarful of Noise, he "wasn't sure" about Martin's assessment of Best's drumming and "was not anxious to change the membership of the Beatles at a time when they were developing as personalities … I asked the Beatles to leave the group as it was". Epstein also asked Liverpool DJ Bob Wooler, who knew the Beatles intimately, for advice, to which Wooler replied that it was not a good idea, as Best was very popular with the fans. Part of the dilemma for Epstein that arose at that time (when the band had not yet achieved national success, but rather local status as a good band with limited income) was that Best was an asset at gigs, popular with the group's female fans, and put on a good show, ensuring venues would have a solid audience. The counter-argument, however, was the larger consideration of the band's having the best music produced for record sales. Lennon, McCartney, and Harrison ultimately decided that record production was more important than having a drummer for live stage performances who was more image than substance. In the meantime, Epstein refrained from telling Best that EMI had made a recording contract with the band, which was orally since June and in writing at the end of July 1962. There might have been legal issues had Best known.

Epstein decided that "if the group was to remain happy, Pete Best must go." Best played his last two gigs with the Beatles on 15 August at the Cavern Club, Liverpool. Epstein summoned Best to his office and dismissed him on Thursday, 16 August, ten weeks and a day after the first recording session. Epstein asked Best to play with the Beatles on 16 and 17 August at the Riverpark Ballroom, Chester, and Best agreed but had a change of heart and did not turn up; Johnny Hutchinson of the Big Three was rushed in as a substitute.

Mersey Beat magazine's editor, Bill Harry, claimed that Epstein initially offered the vacant drummer position in the group to Hutchinson, whom he also managed. Hutchinson is said to have refused the job, saying, "Pete Best is a very good friend of mine. I couldn't do the dirty on him." However, McCartney and Harrison have said they wanted Starr from the beginning after he sat in with them at shows on several occasions when Best was absent. Best says that Epstein revealed at the dismissal meeting that Starr would become the new drummer.

Best had been good friends with Neil Aspinall since 1961 when Aspinall had rented a room in the house where Best lived with his parents. While still part of the group, Best had asked Aspinall to become the band's road manager and personal assistant. Aspinall accepted the job and bought an old Commer van for £80 (equivalent to £1,600 in 2025). Aspinall was waiting for Best downstairs in Epstein's NEMS record shop after the dismissal meeting. The two went to the Grapes pub on Mathew Street, the same street as the Cavern Club, where the group had played. Aspinall was furious at the news, insisting to Best that he would resign from the Beatles. Best strongly advised him to remain with the group. Aspinall's relationship with Mona Best (and their three-week-old baby, Roag) had ended. At the Riverpark Ballroom gig, Aspinall asked Lennon why they had fired Best, to which Lennon replied, "It's got nothing to do with you; you're only the driver."

Starr had previously played with Rory Storm and the Hurricanes – the alternating band at the Kaiserkeller – and had substituted whenever Best was ill or unable to play in Hamburg and Liverpool. Bill Harry reported Best's dismissal on the front page of Mersey Beat magazine, upsetting many Beatles fans. The group encountered some jeering and heckling in the street and on stage for weeks afterwards, with some fans shouting, "Pete forever, Ringo never!" One agitated fan headbutted Harrison in The Cavern, giving him a black eye.

As Best's replacement, Starr accompanied the band on their second recording session with EMI at Abbey Road studios on 4 September 1962. George Martin initially refused to let Starr play. He was unfamiliar with Starr and wanted to avoid any risk of his drumming not being up to par. On 11 September 1962, at the third EMI recording session, Martin used session musician Andy White on the drums for the whole session instead of Starr, as Martin had already booked White after the first session with Best. Starr played the tambourine on some songs while White played the drums. Starr told biographer Hunter Davies years later that he had thought, "That's the end. They're pulling a Pete Best on me."

== Reasons for dismissal ==
=== Drumming ability ===
Lennon said Best was recruited only because they needed a drummer to go to Hamburg. "We were pretty sick of Pete Best, too, because he was a lousy drummer, you know? He never improved, you know? [...] And we were always going to dump him when we could find a decent drummer" [...] "By the time we'd rolled back from Germany, we'd trained him to keep a, you know, a stick to keep going up and down at four in the bar; he couldn't do much else."

McCartney stated Best was "good, but a bit limited". McCartney remembered:

George Martin was used to drummers being very 'in time' because all the big-band session drummers he used had a great sense of time. Now, our Liverpool drummers had a sense of spirit, emotion, economy even, but not a deadly sense of time. This would bother producers making a record. George took us to one side and said, 'I'm really unhappy with the drummer. Would you consider changing him?' We said, 'No, we can't!' It was one of those terrible things you go through as kids. Can we betray him? No. But our career was on the line. Maybe they were going to cancel our contract.

McCartney later suggested Starr's drumming was a significant improvement over Best's:

The truth was, we just kind of fell in love with Ringo's drumming. Ringo was in another band, and we had Pete, and we were working, and we used to see this other band. We said, "God, that drummer's good." And one night, Pete couldn't do it and Ringo sat in for him. And we all just went "[Gasp]." Behind us was this powerhouse and this person who was, like, taking care of the job. And we went, "Oh dear."

Harrison also recalled preferring Starr's drumming. He said "Ringo kept sitting in with the band. And every time Ringo sat in with the band, it just seemed like, this was it."

For his part, Starr said, "I felt I was a much better drummer than [Best] was."

Critic Richie Unterberger described Best's drumming at the Decca audition as "thinly textured and rather unimaginative", adding that Best "pushes the beat a little too fast for comfort". Unterberger thought Starr to be "more talented". Mike Savage, the session engineer, said "I thought Pete Best was very average and didn't keep good time. You could pick up a better drummer in any pub in London. If you've got a quarter of the group being very average, that isn't good. The drummer should be the rock. If the rock isn't good, you start thinking, no. If Decca was going to sign the Beatles, we wouldn't have used Pete Best on the record." Beatles' historian Ian MacDonald, recounting the Decca audition, said that "Best's limitations as a drummer are nakedly apparent". MacDonald notes, of the EMI recording session on 6 June that "this audition version [of "Love Me Do"] shows one of the reasons why Best was sacked. In moving to the ride cymbal for the first middle eight, he slows down and the group falters." Beatles' critic Alan W. Pollack compared the Best, Starr, and Andy White versions of "Love Me Do", and concluded that Best was "an incredibly unsteady and tasteless drummer" on his version.

After the Beatles signed a contract, EMI producer Ron Richards said, "Pete Best wasn't very good. It was me who said to [producer] George Martin he's useless. We've got to change this drummer." Martin said, "[Best] couldn't play drums very well. I mean, he couldn't keep time too well. And I was aware that the band weren't tight. They needed that sort of binding force that a good drummer should give them. So I said to [Beatles manager] Brian [Epstein] I'll get another drummer for the recording session."

Still, Martin claimed to be surprised to learn that Best had been fired from stage shows, hearing the news from Mona via telephone. He said:

I never suggested that Pete Best must go. All I said was that for the purposes of the Beatles' first record, I would rather use a sessions man. I never thought that Brian Epstein would let him go. He seemed to be the most saleable commodity as far as looks went. It was a surprise when I learned that they had dropped Pete. The drums were important to me for a record, but they didn't matter much otherwise. Fans don't pay particular attention to the quality of the drumming.

According to biographer Bob Spitz, "All Pete could do was play Fours", a style of drumming that uses kick drum notes on every quarter note to hold down the beat. Spitz's book also contains an account by engineer Ron Richards of his failed attempts to teach Best somewhat more complicated beats for different songs.

Best has said he did not believe this was the "real reason" and that it "never held up water". On Late Night with David Letterman, he said the reason was "jealousy".

In 1968, authorised Beatles biographer Hunter Davies opined that the firing of Best was "one of the few murky incidents in the Beatles' history. There was something sneaky about the way it was done." Over twenty years later, Mark Lewisohn concluded that "Despite his alleged shortcomings, it was still shabby treatment for Pete... The Beatles had had two years in which to dismiss him but hadn't done so, and now – as they were beginning to reap the rewards for their long, hard slog, with money rolling in and an EMI contract secured – he was out. It was the most underhanded, unfortunate and unforgivable chapter in the Beatles' rise to monumental power."

=== Band chemistry ===
Epstein claimed in his autobiography that Lennon, McCartney and Harrison thought Best was "too conventional to be a Beatle" and added, "though he was friendly with John, he was not liked by George and Paul". It has been documented, in Cynthia Lennon's book John and elsewhere, that while Lennon, McCartney, and Harrison usually spent their offstage time together in Hamburg and Liverpool, writing songs or socialising, Best generally went off alone. This left Best on the outside, as he was not privy to many of the group's experiences, references and in-jokes.

A German photographer, Astrid Kirchherr, asked if they would not mind letting her take photographs of them in a photo session, which impressed them, as other groups had only snapshots taken by friends. The next morning Kirchherr took photographs on the Heiligengeistfeld, a municipal event area close to the Reeperbahn. In the afternoon, Kirchherr took them to her mother's house in Altona – minus Best, who decided not to attend. Dot Rhone, McCartney's then-girlfriend who later visited Hamburg, described Best as being very quiet and never taking part in conversations with the group.

It has been claimed that Epstein became exasperated with Best's refusal to adopt the mop-top-style Beatle haircut as part of their unified look, as he preferred to keep his quiffed hairstyle, though Best later stated that he was never asked to change his hairstyle. In a 1995 BBC Radio Merseyside interview, Kirchherr explained: "My boyfriend, Klaus Voormann, had this hairstyle, and Stuart [Sutcliffe] liked it very, very much. He was the first one who really got the nerve to get the Brylcreem out of his hair and asking me to cut his hair for him. Pete Best has really curly hair, and it wouldn't work."

McCartney explained why Geoff Britton, one-time drummer in his subsequent band Wings, "didn't last long" in that group: "It's like in the Beatles, we had Pete Best. He was a really good drummer, but there just was something; he wasn't quite like the rest of us; we had like a sense of humour in common, and he was nearly in with it all, but it's a fine line, you know, as to what is exactly in and what is nearly in. So he left the band and we were looking for someone who would fit." He told Mark Lewisohn, similarly, that when George Martin suggested "changing" their drummer the Beatles responded: "Well, we're quite happy with him, he works great in the clubs", but also that "Pete had never quite been like the rest of us. We were the wacky trio, and Pete was perhaps a little more sensible; he was slightly different from us; he wasn't quite as artsy as we were."

Harrison said, "Pete kept being sick and not showing up for gigs", and admitted, "I was quite responsible for stirring things up. I conspired to get Ringo in for good; I talked to Paul and John until they came round to the idea."

=== Difficulties between Mona Best and others ===
Before Epstein took the Beatles on, Mona had been handling most of the management and promotional work. According to promoter and manager Joe Flannery, Mona had done a great deal for the band by arranging several important early gigs and lending them a badly-needed helping hand when they returned from Hamburg the first time, but this came at the cost of having to contend with her overbearing nature. At this crucial time in the history of the Beatles, Lennon confided to Flannery that he considered Mona "bossy like [his aunt] Mimi" and believed that she was using the Beatles only for the sake of her son Pete. However, this should be weighed against the fact that the Beatles' cordial relations with Mona soon resumed. She often met them while visiting Neil Aspinall at his London home. On these occasions, the Beatles often had small gifts for her, which they had acquired on their travels. For her part, Mona allowed them to use her father's military medals in the photo shoot for the Sgt. Pepper album cover.

Although Epstein's publicly stated reluctance to fire Best quickly became a matter of record in the early biographies, he had found Mona to be the cause of mounting aggravation. She had contractual ties to the band, making it difficult to dismiss Pete; breaking the group would nullify any contract Mona held. Meanwhile, Epstein's distaste for her interference in the Beatles' management, including her "aggressive opinions about his handling of her son's career", was obvious to everyone, and he also reportedly considered Mona a loose cannon who must not be allowed to interfere in his operations. Moreover, the very recent birth of her son Roag further complicated matters. Although Best was not personally responsible for this development, it might have caused a scandal at a crucial moment in the Beatles' career had it become generally known. Epstein would have been horrified at the prospect.

=== Popularity ===
Best's popularity with fans was reportedly a source of friction, as many female fans considered him the band's best-looking member. Radio Merseyside presenter Spencer Leigh wrote a book chronicling Best's firing, suggesting that the other members, McCartney in particular, were jealous. In an issue of Bill Harry's Mersey Beat music publication in Liverpool, dated 31 August 1961, Bob Wooler reported on the Beatles' local musical impact and singled out Best for particular praise, calling the group "musically authoritative and physically magnetic, example the mean, moody magnificence of drummer Pete Best – a sort of teenage Jeff Chandler". During the Teenagers' Turn showcase in Manchester, Lennon, McCartney and Harrison walked on stage to applause, but when Best walked on, the girls screamed. Afterwards, attentive female fans surrounded Best at the stage door, while the other members were ignored after signing a few autographs. McCartney's father, Jim McCartney, was present at the time and admonished Best: "Why did you have to attract all the attention? Why didn't you call the other lads back? I think that was very selfish of you." Lennon called the accusations of jealousy a "myth".

In 1963, on British television, Mona, with Pete present, said of his dismissal:

Mona: "From the point of clash of personalities, well, probably that may be it because Peter did have a terrific fan club, you know, compared to the others."

[Interviewer: Too good looking perhaps?]

Mona: "I'll leave that for other people to say, but from my point of view, we haven't come here to sort of throw any sticks and stones at the boys because there is no really hard feeling. There was at first, but as they say, success is hard to come by, and these things do happen, but it's just the way that it was done that has annoyed us. That's all. If it had been done a bit more straightforward, it would have been more to the mark."

== After the Beatles ==
Lennon, McCartney, and Harrison all later stated that they regretted the manner in which Best was sacked. Lennon admitted that "we were cowards when we sacked him. We made Brian do it." McCartney stated: "I do feel sorry for him because of what he could have been on to." Harrison said: "We weren't very good at telling Pete he had to go", and "historically, it may look like we did something nasty to Pete and it may have been that we could have handled it better." Starr, on the other hand, felt he had no apology to make: "I never felt sorry… I was not involved."

After Best was dismissed, Epstein attempted to console him by offering him a position as drummer for the Mersey Beats, but a distraught Best turned it down. Feeling let down and depressed, he sat at home for two weeks, not wanting to face anybody or answer the inevitable questions about why he had been sacked. On 25 September 1962, Best's solicitor sent a demand letter to Epstein threatening to sue for wrongful dismissal unless Best received damages. The letter argued that since Best's name was on the Beatles' original management contract, Epstein was still required to find work for him. Epstein sent a response letter that made three arguments: he had already arranged for Best to join another group, Best had lacked the necessary talent to "fulfil his obligations" to the Beatles, and Best had left the Beatles voluntarily. The band's next management contract, signed by Starr instead of Best, contained a provision allowing for one member to be dismissed at the behest of Epstein and at least two other band members; the provision was never invoked.

Epstein secretly arranged with his booking agent partner, Joe Flannery, for Best to join Lee Curtis and the All-Stars, which broke off from Curtis to become Pete Best & the All-Stars. They signed to Decca Records, releasing the single "I'm Gonna Knock on Your Door" in 1964, which was commercially unsuccessful.

=== The Pete Best Combo ===
Best later moved to the United States along with songwriters Wayne Bickerton and Tony Waddington. As the Pete Best Four, and later as the Pete Best Combo (a quintet), they toured the United States with a combination of 1950s songs and original tunes, recording for small labels, but they had little success. They ultimately released an album on Savage Records, Best of the Beatles: a play on Best's name, leading to disappointment for record buyers who neglected to read the song titles on the front cover and expected a Beatles compilation album. The group disbanded shortly afterwards. Bickerton and Waddington were to find greater success as songwriters in the 1960s and 1970s, writing a series of hits for the American female group the Flirtations and the British group the Rubettes. In 1996, the record label Cherry Red reissued the Pete Best Combo's recordings as a compact disc compilation. Richie Unterberger, reviewing the CD, stated that the music's "energy level is reasonably high", that Bickerton and Waddington's songwriting is "kind of catchy", but that Best's drumming is "ordinary".

American garage rock band Lyres recorded a cover version of Pete Best Combo's "The Way I Feel About You" on their 1984 album On Fyre.

== Later years ==
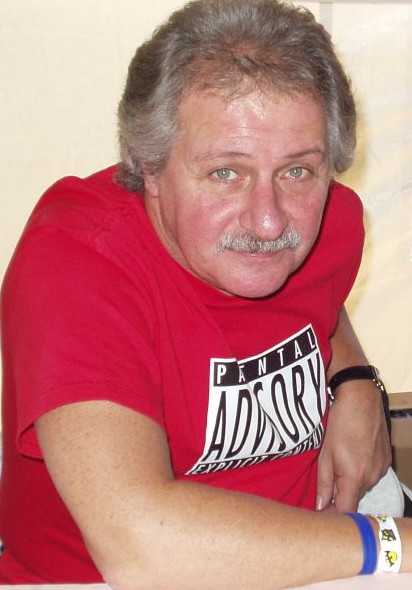
Best in October 2005

After six years of being in commercially unsuccessful bands Best in 1968 made the difficult decision to leave the music business for good. In 1968, when Hunter Davies was researching his authorised Beatles biography, Best was unwilling to discuss his association with the Beatles for the book. Years later, he stated in his autobiography, "the Beatles themselves certainly never held out a helping hand and only contributed to the destruction with their readily printed gossip that I had never really been a Beatle, that I didn't smile, that I was unsociable and definitely not a good mixer. There was not a single friendly word from any one of them". This culminated in a Beatles' interview published in Playboy magazine in February 1965 in which Lennon stated that "Ringo used to fill in sometimes if our drummer was ill. With his periodic illness." Starr added, "He took little pills to make him ill." Best sued his former band for defamation of character, eventually agreeing to an out-of-court settlement for much less than the $18 million he had sought.

Davies recalled that while working with the Beatles on their authorised biography in 1968, "when the subject of Pete Best came up, they seemed to cut off as if he had never touched their lives. They showed little reaction [...] I suppose it reminded them not just that they had been rather sneaky in the handling of Pete Best's sacking, never telling him to his face, but that for the grace of God, or Brian Epstein, circumstances might have been different and they could have ended up [like Pete]." Best attempted suicide in the 1960s, but his mother, Mona, and his brother, Rory, prevented him from completing it.

In 1963, Best married Kathy, a Woolworths sales clerk whom he met at an early Beatles show; they have remained married and have two daughters and four grandchildren. Best did shift work loading bread into the back of delivery vans, earning £8 a week (equivalent to £100 in 2025). His education qualifications subsequently helped him become a civil servant working at the Garston Jobcentre in Liverpool, where he rose from employment officer to training manager for the Northwest of England, and remembered "a steady stream of real-life Yosser Hughes types" imploring him to give them jobs. The most he could do, he recalls, was to offer to retrain them in other fields, "which was an emotional issue for people who had done one kind of work all their lives."

Eventually, Best began giving interviews to the media, writing about his time with the group and serving as a technical advisor for the television film Birth of the Beatles. He found a modicum of independent fame and has admitted to being a fan of his former band's music and owning their records. In 1995, the surviving Beatles released Anthology 1, which featured ten tracks with Best as drummer, including songs from the Decca and Parlophone auditions. Best received a substantial windfall – between £1 million and £4 million (equivalent to £2,495,400-£9,981,600 in 2026 adjusted for inflation) from the sales, although he was not interviewed for the book or the documentaries. According to writer Philip Norman, the first time Best knew about the royalties due him for the use of those tracks "was a phone call" from Paul McCartney himself, "the one who'd been so keen to get rid of him" – the first time they'd spoken since it happened. "Some wrongs need to be righted," McCartney told him. "There's some money here that's owing to you and you can take it or leave it" – Best took it. However, Best asserts that it was Neil Aspinall and not McCartney who phoned him. "Paul McCartney claims he called me but he didn't," Best told The Irish Times.

The collage of torn photographs on the Anthology 1 album cover includes an early group photo that featured Best, but Best's head was removed, revealing a photo of Starr's head, taken from the Please Please Me cover photo (the missing section of the photograph appears on the cover of Best's album Haymans Green). A small photograph of Best can be seen on the left side of the Anthology cover. Best appeared in an advertisement for Carlsberg lager that was broadcast during the first commercial break of the first episode of the Anthology TV series on ITV in November 1995. The tagline was "Probably the Pete Best lager in the world", a variation of Carlsberg's well-known slogan.

=== The Pete Best Band ===
In 1988, after twenty years of turning down all requests to play drums in public, Best finally relented, appearing at a Beatles convention in Liverpool. He and his brother Roag performed, and afterwards, his wife and mother both told him, "You don't know it, but you're going to go back into show business." The Pete Best Band's album Haymans Green, made entirely from original material, was released on 16 September 2008 in the US, 24 October 2008 worldwide, excluding the UK, and 27 October 2008 in the UK.

Following a long run of regularly touring the world with the Pete Best Band, and sharing the drumming with his younger brother Roag, Best abruptly announced his retirement from public appearances and performing on 5 April 2025, "due to personal circumstances."

=== Honours ===
On 6 July 2007, Best was inducted into the All You Need Is Liverpool Music Hall of Fame as the debut Charter Member. Best was presented with a framed certificate before his band performed. Liverpool further honoured Best with the announcement, on 25 July 2011, that two new streets in the city would be named Pete Best Drive and Casbah Close. On 3 November 2025, the main belt asteroid 1989 SD_{8} was named 100016 Petebest in his honour. In 2026, French musician Olhivier paid tribute to him with the song Une star a pris ma vie, released on the album Sombres saisons.

== Portrayals in media ==
=== Film and television ===
Best is portrayed in several films about the Beatles. In the 1979 biopic Birth of the Beatles, for which Best was a technical advisor, he is played by Ryan Michael. In both the 1994 film Backbeat and in the 2000 television biopic In His Life: The John Lennon Story, Best is played by Liverpool native Scot Williams. The 2008 Rainn Wilson film The Rocker, about a drummer kicked out of a glam metal band through no fault of his own, was inspired by Best's termination. Best had a cameo in the movie. In Midas Man, a 2024 biopic about Brian Epstein, Best is played by Adam Lawrence.

=== Theatre ===
BEST!, a comedy play written by Liverpool playwright Fred Lawless, was staged at the Liverpool Everyman Theatre and the Dublin Theatre Festival in 1995 and 1996. The play, which was mainly fiction, showed an alternate history scenario where after Pete Best's sacking, he went on to unexpectedly become a world-famous rock superstar while his ex-group struggled as one hit wonders. The play was critically acclaimed in both the Liverpool Echo and also in Spencer Leigh's 1998 book Drummed Out: The Sacking of Pete Best. Pete Best is a main character in David Harrower's 2001 play Presence, premiered at the Royal Court Theatre, London, dramatising the Beatles' time in Hamburg.

Andrew Games portrayed Pete Best in BestBeat, which was performed at the Unity Theatre in 2018. The play depicted Best's dismissal in 1962.

== Discography ==
=== Albums ===
- Best of the Beatles (Savage BM 71, Released: 1965)
  - Includes: "I Need Your Lovin"; "Just Wait and See"; "Casting My Spell"; "Keys to My Heart"; "Why Did You Leave Me Baby?"; "Like My Sister Kate"; "I Can't Do Without You Now"; "I'm Blue"; "Some Other Guy"; "She's Alright"; "Nobody But You"; "Last Night"
- The Beatle That Time Forgot [Original Version] (Phoenix PB-22, Released: 1981)
  - Includes: "I'm Checking Out Now Baby"; "I'll Try Any Way"; "I Don't Know Why (I Just Do)"; "How'd You Get to Know Her Name"; "She's Not the Only Girl in Town"; "If You Can't Get Her"; "More Than I Need My Self"; "I'll Have Everything Too"; "The Way I feel About You"; "Don't Play With Me (Little Girl)"; "Rock and Roll Music"; "All Aboard"
- Rebirth (Phoenix PB-44, Released: 1981)
  - Includes: "I Can't Do Without You Now"; "Off the Hook"; "She's Alright"; "I Need Your Lovin'"; "Why Did You Leave Me Baby"; "High School Shimmy"; "I Wanna Be There"; "Everybody"; "Pete's Theme"; "Keys to My Heart"
- The Beatle That Time Forgot [Reissue] (Phoenix PHX 340, Released: 1982)
  - Includes: "I'll Try Anyway"; "I Don't Know Why I Do (I Just Do)"; "She's Not the Only Girl in Town"; "More Than I Need My Self"; "I'll Have Everything Too"; "I'm Checking Out Now Baby"; "How'd You Get to Know Her Name"; "If You Can't Get Her"; "Rock and Roll Music"
- Back to the Beat – (1995)
- The Pete Best Combo: Beyond the Beatles 1964–1966 (1 February 1996)
- Live at the Adelphi Liverpool 1988 – (23 September 1996)
- Best (18 August 1998)
- Casbah Coffee Club 40th Anniversary Limited Edition (1999)
- The Savage Young Beatles (10 May 2004)
- Haymans Green – Released 16 September 2008 (US), August 2008 (UK) (The Pete Best Band)

=== Singles ===
- "I'm Gonna Knock on Your Door" b/w "Why Did I Fall in Love with You" (Decca F 11929, Released: 1964)
- "Don't Play With Me (Little Girl)" b/w "If You Can't Get Her" (Happening 405, Released: 1965)
- "If You Can't Get Her" b/w "The Way I Feel About You" (Happening HA1117, Released: 1965)
- "Kansas City" b/w "Boys" (Cameo 391, Released: 1965)
- "(I'll Try) Anyway" b/w "I Wanna Be There" (Original Beatles Drummer 800, Released: 1965)
- "I Can't Do Without You Now" b/w "Keys to My Heart" (Mr. Maestro Records 711, Released: 1965)

== See also ==
- Outline of the Beatles
- The Beatles timeline
- Jimmie Nicol - The Beatles' replacement drummer for 10 days during their 1964 tour of Australasia while Ringo Starr was sick.
