= John (2005 book) =

Book by Cynthia Lennon

- First edition cover
- Author: Cynthia Lennon
- Language: English
- Subject: John Lennon
- Genre: Biography, memoir
- Publication date: October 2005
- Media type: Print (hardback & paperback)

John is a 2005 book by Cynthia Lennon about the life of her first husband, musician John Lennon, as well as her own life. First published by Hodder & Stoughton, the book chronicles her relationship with Lennon prior to, during, and after his period as a member of the Beatles, including the birth of their son Julian Lennon, her and John's divorce, John's subsequent remarriage to Yoko Ono, and Cynthia and Julian's life following John's 1980 murder.

John was Cynthia's second book, following her 1978 memoir A Twist of Lennon.

== Reception ==
Michel Faber of The Guardian gave the book a mostly negative review, writing that its "stated purpose is to counteract the way she's [Cynthia's] been airbrushed out of history, to prove that her marriage to John was not the irrelevance he claimed it was. Instead, she paints herself even further into the background, with prose so characterless and bland it might as well have been produced by a half-asleep hack." The Independent's Mark Timlin wrote that, in comparison to other books about the Beatles, John "has the ring of truth that most do not", and called it "the story of a one-man woman whose man got away in one of the most public demonstrations of adultery ever. But I've got to tell you, given a choice between going out with Cynthia or Yoko, [...] I'd choose Cynthia every time."
