= Manorhaus, Ruthin =

Building in Denbighshire, Wales

Manorhaus
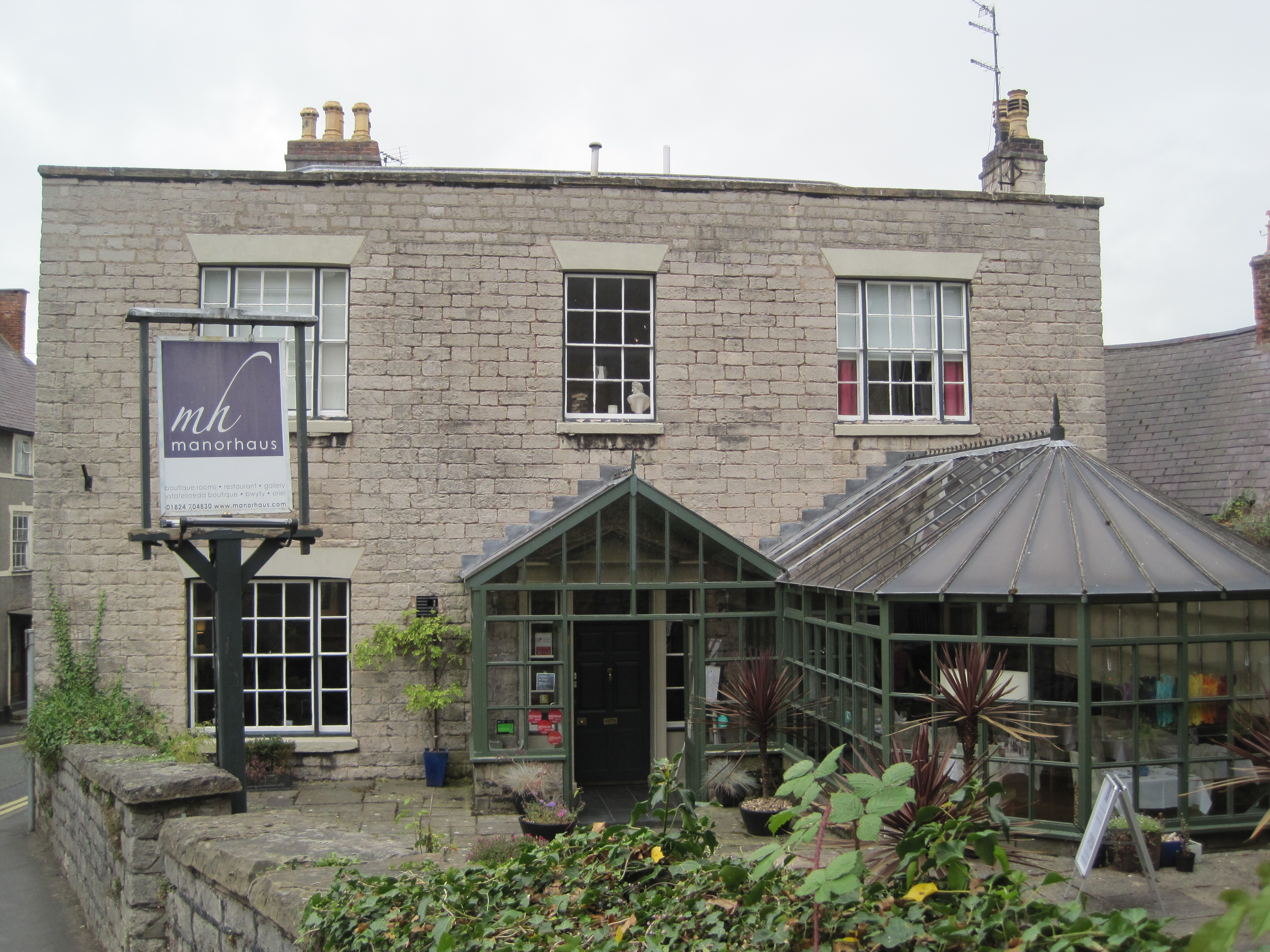
- Manorhaus in 2013

- Location within Denbighshire

General information
- Status: Completed
- Location: Ruthin, Denbighshire, Wales
- Coordinates: 53.113935°N 3.309146°W

Listed Building – Grade II
- Official name: Manor House
- Designated: 4 July 1966
- Reference no.: 941

Manorhaus (Manor House) is a Grade II listed building in the community of Ruthin, Denbighshire, Wales, which dates back to the late 18th and early 19th centuries. It was listed by Cadw (reference number 941) in 1966. It was listed for its late-Georgian features as they are of special architectural interest. It was a boarding house of Ruthin School, before it moved to its new site in 1893. It was then a doctor's house, before it being turned into a restaurant.

Manorhaus is currently a boutique restaurant with rooms and is also an art gallery. It was owned by John Lennon's first wife, Cynthia Lennon, and their son, Julian Lennon, attended Ruthin School. Manorhaus has eight rooms, each decorated with a different theme and interior design by local artists. It also has a gym, sauna, steam room and also a library available to guests.
