= Bill Harry =

British journalist (born 1938)

- Born: William Harry; 17 September 1938 (age 87); Liverpool, England, UK
- Occupations: Journalist, public relations agent
- Years active: 1958−present
- Spouse: Virginia Sowry
- Children: 1
- Website: Triumphpc

William Harry (born 17 September 1938) is a British journalist who founded Mersey Beat, a newspaper of the early 1960s focused on the Liverpool music scene. Harry had previously started various magazines and newspapers, such as Biped and Premier, while at Liverpool's Junior School of Art. He later attended the Liverpool College of Art, where his fellow students included John Lennon and Stuart Sutcliffe, who both later performed with the Beatles. He published a magazine, Jazz, in 1958, and worked as an assistant editor on the University of Liverpool's charity magazine, Pantosphinx.

Harry met his wife-to-be, Virginia Sowry, at the Jacaranda club—managed by Allan Williams, the first manager of the Beatles—and she later agreed to help him start a music newspaper. After borrowing £50, Harry released the first issue of Mersey Beat on 6 July 1961, with the first 5,000 copies selling out within a short time. The newspaper was published every two weeks, covering the music scenes in Liverpool, Wirral, Birkenhead, New Brighton, Crosby and Southport, as well as Warrington, Widnes and Runcorn. He edited the paper in a small attic office above a wine merchant's shop at 81a Renshaw Street, Liverpool.

Harry arranged for the future Beatles' manager, Brian Epstein, to see them perform a lunchtime concert at the Cavern Club on 9 November 1961. Epstein subsequently asked Harry to create a national music paper, the Music Echo. After disagreements with Epstein about editorial control, he decided to become a public relations agent, and went on to work for artists such as Pink Floyd, Jethro Tull, Procol Harum, David Bowie, Led Zeppelin and the Beach Boys.

== Early years ==
Harry was born in Smithdown Road Hospital (now demolished), in Liverpool, Lancashire, on 17 September 1938. He came from a poor Liverpudlian background and was brought up in a rough neighbourhood near Liverpool's dockyards. His father (John Jelicoe Harry), was killed during the war on the SS Kyleglen British Steam Merchant ship, which was torpedoed in the middle of the Atlantic Ocean by a German U-boat. None of the crew survived, and Harry's father died on 14 December 1940, aged 25. Harry attended the Catholic St. Vincent's Institute, but had to get used to the priests dispensing corporal punishment on a regular basis. Because of his small stature, Harry was beaten by his classmates, being once kicked in the appendix and "left for dead". His mother had no option but to transfer him elsewhere.

Harry became interested in science fiction and read comics by candlelight (as the house had no electricity), eventually joining the Liverpool Science Fiction Society. At the age of 13, he produced his own science fiction fanzine, Biped, using a Gestetner machine to print 60 copies. His pen friend at the time was Michael Moorcock; the writer of science fiction and fantasy novels. After winning a scholarship to the Junior School of Art in Gambier Terrace, Liverpool, Harry started his first school newspaper, Premier.

=== Liverpool College of Art ===
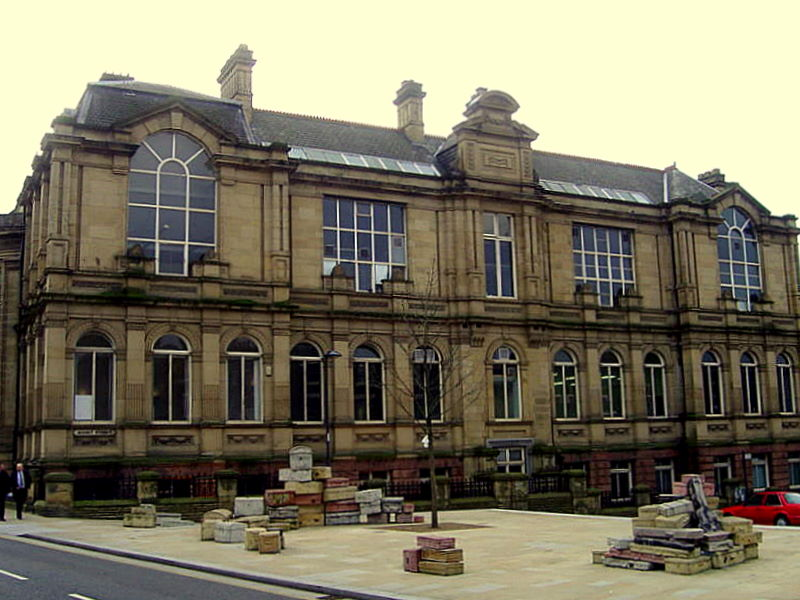
The Liverpool College of Art at 68 Hope Street, Liverpool, which Harry, Lennon and Sutcliffe all attended

At the age of 16, Harry obtained a place at Liverpool's College of Art at 68 Hope Street. After studying typography and page layouts, he borrowed the college's duplicating machine and published a newspaper called Jazz in 1958, which reported concerts at the Liverpool Jazz Society club, the Temple Jazz Club and the Cavern Club. He also worked as assistant editor on the University of Liverpool's charity magazine, Pantosphinx, and on a music newsletter for Frank Hessy's musical instruments store called Frank Comments. The title was suggested by the owner, Frank Hesselberg, as a play on his own comments, but was abandoned after a few issues.

Harry received a National Diploma in design while at the Liverpool Art College and became the first student in the new Graphic Design course, eventually winning a Senior City Art Scholarship. Harry maintained that students at art college should be bohemian in their thoughts and actions and not like the "dilettantes and dabblers", whom Harry disapproved of for wearing duffle coats and turtle neck sweaters. One of the college's artists and teachers, Arthur Ballard, later stated that Harry and Sutcliffe both overshadowed Lennon at college, explaining that they were both "extremely well educated, and very eager for information". Harry organised a students' film society, where he showed Orphee, by Jean Cocteau and Salvador Dalí, and Luis Buñuel's, L'Age d'Or.

Meeting Lennon had been a shock for Harry, as Lennon often dressed like a Teddy boy, and was a disruptive influence at the college. Despite his misgivings about Lennon, Harry introduced him to Sutcliffe, who was a small, softly-spoken and shy student, who had painted a portrait of Harry. The three often spent time together at the Cracke pub in Rice Street, or on the top floor of the Jacaranda club (run by Williams, who later managed the Beatles). Harry met his then 16-year-old future wife-to-be, Virginia Sowry, at the club. Harry, Lennon, Sutcliffe and Rod Murray saw the poet Royston Ellis at Liverpool University in June 1960. Having been disappointed with Ellis' performance, Harry proposed the idea that they should call the assembled quartet of friends the Dissenters, and make Liverpool famous: Sutcliffe and Murray with their paintings, Harry's writing and Lennon's music.

=== Music and journalism ===
A fellow student, John Ashcroft, introduced Harry to rock 'n' roll records, and the members of Rory Storm & the Hurricanes and Cass & the Cassanovas. Harry carried notebooks with him, collecting information about the local groups, once writing to the Daily Mail: "Liverpool is like New Orleans at the turn of the century, but with rock 'n' roll instead of jazz". He also wrote to the Liverpool Echo about the emerging Liverpool music scene, but neither paper was interested in stories about music that was popular with teenagers. The classified ads in the Liverpool Echo for local groups were always under the heading of Jazz, but the paper refused to change this policy, despite pleas from the promoters and groups who actually paid for them. Harry planned to produce a jazz newspaper called Storyville/52nd Street and contacted Sam Leach, the owner of a club called Storyville. Leach promised to fund the newspaper, but failed to turn up for three meetings with Harry, leaving him no other option but to find another investor. Harry thought starting a fortnightly newspaper covering Liverpool's rock 'n' roll music scene would be more successful, and would differ from national music newspapers such as the New Musical Express and the Melody Maker, which only wrote articles about current chart hits and artists.

== Mersey Beat ==
Photographer Dick Matthews, a friend from the Jacaranda, heard about Harry's problems with Leach and introduced Harry to a local civil servant, Jim Anderson, who lent Harry £50. This enabled Harry to found Mersey Beat in 1961. Harry decided to publish the newspaper every two weeks, covering the music scene in Liverpool, Wirral, Birkenhead, New Brighton, Crosby and Southport, as well as Warrington, Widnes and Runcorn. He thought up the name Mersey Beat by thinking about a policeman's 'beat' (the area of duty), which had nothing to do with a musical beat. Virginia gave up her accountancy/comptometer operator job at Woolworth's and worked full-time for £2.10/- a week (also contributing a Mersey Roundabout article), while Harry lived on his Senior City Art Scholarship funding. Matthews photographed groups, while Anderson found a small attic office for £5 a week above David Land's wine merchant's shop at 81a Renshaw Street, Liverpool. Anderson and Matthews helped with the move to the new office, with Anderson providing a desk, chair and an Olivetti typewriter.

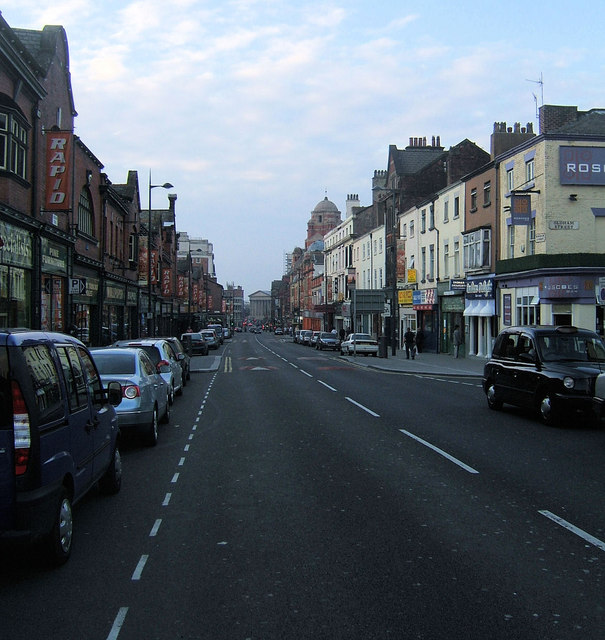
The original Mersey Beat office was at 81a Renshaw Street, Liverpool. (green shop front on the right)

Harry asked printer James E. James (who had printed Frank Comments), if he could borrow the printing blocks he used for photos, as they were too expensive for the fledgling company at the time. Harry also borrowed blocks from the Widnes Weekly News, Pantosphinx and local cinemas, but contributed to charities by printing free charity advertisements at the side of the front cover page. After taking Virginia home to Bowring Park in the evening, Harry would often return to the office and work throughout the night, pausing only to go to the Pier Head to buy a cup of tea and a hot pie at four in the morning. Virginia's parents helped the paper during this time, as they paid for classified ads, and arranged for Harry and his future wife's first photographs together.

=== The first issue ===
Splitting the price of the newspaper (three pence), with retailers, Harry arranged for three major wholesalers, W.H. Smith, Blackburn's and Conlan's, to sell Mersey Beat. Harry personally delivered copies to more than 20 newsagents as well as to local venues and musical instrument and record stores, such as Cramer & Lea, Rushworth & Draper and Cranes. The paper released its first edition on 6 July 1961, selling out all 5,000 copies. The paper's circulation increased rapidly as Harry started featuring stories about groups in Manchester, Birmingham, Sheffield and Newcastle, with circulation growing to 75,000. As the newspaper's sales rose, it became known as the "Teenagers Bible". Local groups were soon being called "beat groups", and venues started advertising concerts as "Beat Sessions". With circulation rising, the paper's offices were moved downstairs to a larger two-roomed office. The Cavern Club's doorman, Pat (Paddy) Delaney, was employed to deliver copies, a secretary, Pat Finn, was hired, as well as Raymond Caine to promote advertising space.

Harry later said: "The newspapers, television, theatres and radio were all run by people of a different generation who had no idea of what youngsters wanted. For decades they had manipulated and controlled them. Suddenly, there was an awareness of being young, and young people wanted their own styles and their own music, just at the time they were beginning to earn money, which gave them the spending power. Mersey Beat was their voice, it was a paper for them, crammed with photos and information about their own groups, which is why it also began to appeal to youngsters throughout Britain as its coverage extended to other areas." Because of the employment situation in Liverpool at the time, the Daily Worker newspaper denounced the enthusiasm of younger people in Liverpool by saying "The Mersey Sound is the sound of 30,000 people on the dole."

=== Liverpool groups ===
Between 1958 and 1964, the Merseyside area had about 500 different groups, which were constantly forming and breaking up, with an average of about 350 groups playing concerts on a regular basis. In 1961, Harry and the Cavern Club's DJ, Bob Wooler, compiled a list of groups that they had personally heard of, which had almost 300 names. In 1962, Mersey Beat held a poll to find out who was the most popular Merseyside group. When the votes were counted, Rory Storm & the Hurricanes were in first place, but after looking through the postal votes again, Harry noticed that forty votes were all written in green ink, in the same handwriting, and from the same area of Liverpool, so the dubious votes were declared void. This was suspected to have been Storm himself, but Harry had no idea that the Beatles and other groups had done exactly the same thing.

The results were announced on 4 January 1962, with the Beatles in first place. The results were printed in issue 13 of Mersey Beat on 4 January 1962, with the now famous front page announcing, "Beatles Top Poll!" Such was the popularity of the poll, Rushworth's music store manager, Bob Hobbs, presented Lennon and George Harrison with new guitars. At the time, many groups in Liverpool complained to Harry that his newspaper should be called Mersey Beatles, as he featured them so often.

Harry asked a local singer, Priscilla White, to contribute a fashion column after writing an article called "Swinging Cilla", in which he wrote, "Cilla Black is a Liverpool girl who is starting out on the road to fame." Harry's mistake came about because he could not remember her surname (which he knew was a colour), but White decided to keep it as a stage name. Two years later Harry arranged for her to sing for Epstein at the Blue Angel club, leading to a management contract.

In late 1962, Harry wrote an article called "Take a look up North", asking for A&R men from London to travel up to Liverpool and see what was really happening with the music scene, but not one record company sent an A&R representative to Liverpool. Journalist Nancy Spain once wrote an article for the News of the World newspaper, stating that "Bill and Virginia Harry were Mr. & Mrs. Mersey Beat", and when Bob Dylan visited Liverpool to appear at the Odeon, he specifically asked for Harry to act as his guide to the city.

=== The Beatles and Brian Epstein ===
Harry often heard Lennon, McCartney and Harrison rehearsing or playing in the Art College canteen in the basement, but after Sutcliffe joined the Quarrymen, Harry complained that Sutcliffe should be concentrating on art and not music, as he thought he was a competent, but not brilliant bassist. As Harry and Sutcliffe were members of the Liverpool College of Art's Student Union committee, they put forward the idea that the college should buy its own P.A. system for college dances, which the Quarrymen often played at, but the equipment would later be appropriated by the group and taken to Hamburg. As late as 7 March 1962, the Students' Union sent Pete Mackey to ask Lennon to either return the equipment or pay for it, but Lennon told him it had been sold in Hamburg. Harry asked Lennon to write a short biography of the Beatles for the first issue of Mersey Beat, which Harry titled, "Being a Short Diversion on the Dubious Origins of Beatles, Translated From the [sic] John Lennon":

Many people ask what are Beatles? Why Beatles? Ugh, Beatles? How did the name arrive? So we will tell you. It came in a vision – a man appeared on a flaming pie and said unto them, 'From this day on you are Beatles with an "A". 'Thank you Mister Man', they said, thanking him. And so they were Beatles."

Lennon was very grateful that Harry printed his 'Dubious Origins' piece without editing it and later gave Harry a large collection of drawings, poems and stories (approximately 250), telling Harry he was free to publish whatever he liked (under the pseudonym of "Beatcomber", which was appropriated from a Daily Express column, Beachcomber).

Harry convinced Epstein to sell 12 copies of the first Mersey Beat newspaper at his North End Music Stores (NEMS), which sold out in one day, resulting in Epstein having to order more copies. After ordering and selling 144 copies of the second issue, Epstein invited Harry to his office for a glass of sherry, proposing the idea that he (Epstein), should write a record review column. It was published in the third issue on 3 August 1961, entitled "Stop the World—And Listen To Everything in It: Brian Epstein of NEMS". Epstein saw numerous posters around Liverpool advertising concerts by the Beatles as well as in the second issue of Mersey Beat, which had "Beatles sign Recording Contract!" on the front cover, as the Beatles had recorded the "My Bonnie" single with Tony Sheridan in Germany. Some months after its release, Epstein supposedly (as stated in his biography), asked his assistant Alistair Taylor about the single, because a customer, one Raymond Jones, had asked Epstein for the single on 28 October 1961, which made Epstein curious about the group. Harry and McCartney repudiated this story, as Harry had been talking to Epstein about the Beatles for a long time (being the group he promoted the most in Mersey Beat), and by McCartney saying, "Brian [Epstein] knew perfectly well who the Beatles were, they were on the front page of the second issue of Mersey Beat."

The Beatles were due to perform a lunchtime concert at the Cavern Club on 9 November 1961, not far from Epstein's NEMS store. Epstein asked Harry to arrange for him and Taylor to watch the Beatles perform without queuing at the door. Harry phoned the owner, Ray McFall, who said he would inform the doorman on the day, Delaney, to let Epstein in. Epstein and Taylor bypassed the line of fans at the door and heard a welcome message announced over the club's public-address system by Wooler: "We have someone rather famous in the audience today, Mr. Brian Epstein, the owner of NEMS ..."

Lennon had once given Harry a collection of photos taken in Hamburg, showing Lennon standing on the Reeperbahn reading a newspaper and wearing nothing but his underpants, performing on stage with a toilet seat around his neck, and one of McCartney sitting on a toilet. After Epstein became the Beatles' manager, Lennon rushed into Harry's office and asked for them back, saying, "Brian [Epstein] insists I've got to get them back—the pictures, everything you've got. I must take it all with me now." When Epstein finally secured a recording contract with EMI, he sent Harry a telegram from London to the Mersey Beat office to announce the news.

=== The last issues and London ===
On 13 September 1964, Epstein approached Harry to create a national music paper, so Harry coined the name Music Echo, and gradually merged Mersey Beat into it. Epstein had promised Harry full editorial control, but then hired a female press officer in London to write a fashion column and a D.J. to write a gossip column, without informing Harry of his intentions, leaving Harry with no other option but to resign. The paper subsequently ran into financial problems, and Epstein had to merge it with another paper, becoming the Disc & Music Echo. When Harry and his wife moved to London in 1966, he was already contributing a column for the magazine Weekend and also for the teen magazines Marilyn and Valentine. He then became the feature writer, news editor and columnist for Record Mirror (using various pseudonyms such as 'Brenda Tarry' and 'David Berglas'), and wrote features for Music Now (under the name of Nick Blaine) for Record Retailer.

== Present ==
Harry and his wife moved to London in 1966 where he was engaged as a public relations officer for the Kinks and the Hollies. During the next 18 years he was the public relations person to many artists, including Pink Floyd, Jethro Tull, Procol Harum, David Bowie, Led Zeppelin, the Beach Boys, Clouds, Ten Years After, Free, Mott the Hoople, the Pretty Things, Christine Perfect, Supertramp, Hot Chocolate, Arrows, Suzi Quatro and Kim Wilde. During this time, Harry started a monthly magazine called Tracks, which reported the latest album releases, and another magazine, Idols: 20th Century Legends, which ran for 37 issues, from 1988 to 1991. Harry also compiled a 34-track compilation, Mersey Beat, for Parlophone records, which was released on 31 October 1983.

Harry was presented with a gold award for a "Lifetime Achievement in Music" by the British Academy of Songwriters, Composers and Authors (BASCA) in 1994, has taken part in over 350 international television/radio shows, and was hired by Rediffusion to be programme assistant for the documentary Beat City. He was a programme assistant for the BBC's Everyman documentary about Lennon, A Day in the Life, and for The Story of Mersey Beat. The British Council asked him to represent them in Hong Kong, promoting the Beatles. Mersey Beat returned to publication in August 2009 with a 24-page special issue to celebrate the "Liverpool International Beatle Week". He was an associate producer of the film The City That Rocked the World.

Harry and Virginia have a son, Sean Harry, who is a director and producer.

== Books written or co-written by Bill Harry ==
Harry once commented on his numerous books: "The hundreds of interviews I have conducted over the past 40 years have been utilised. I have always been a hoarder of clippings in addition to collecting magazines, fanzines, newspapers and books. I'll never tire of it."

- Arrows : The Official Story, Everest Books (1976) ISBN 978-0-903925-61-7
- Mersey Beat: The Beginnings of the Beatles, Omnibus Press (1978) ISBN 978-0-86001-415-7
- The Beatles Who's Who, Littlehampton Book Services Ltd. (1982) ISBN 978-0-906053-38-6
- Beatle-mania: The History of the Beatles on Film, Virgin Books (1984) ISBN 978-0-86369-041-9
- Paperback Writers, Virgin Books (1984) ISBN 978-0-86369-021-1
- The Book of Lennon, John Wiley & Sons Australia Ltd (1984) ISBN 978-0-906053-74-4
- Paperback writers Avon (1985) ISBN 978-0-380-89558-8
- Beatles: Beatlemania the History of the Beatles on Film Avon (1985) ISBN 978-0-380-89557-1
- Ask Me Why, Littlehampton Book Services Ltd. (1985) ISBN 978-0-7137-1635-1
- Beatles For Sale, Virgin Books (1985) ISBN 978-0-86369-097-6
- The Book of Beatle Lists, Javelin Books (1985) ISBN 978-0-7137-1521-7
- The McCartney File, Virgin Books (1986) ISBN 978-0-86369-157-7
- Sgt. Pepper's Lonely Hearts Club Band, Atalanta Press (1987) ISBN 978-1-870049-08-5
- The Ultimate Beatles Encyclopedia, Hyperion Books (1994) ISBN 978-0-7868-8071-3
- Jan Olofsson: My '60s, (Harry & Olofsson) Taschen GmbH (1994) ISBN 978-3-8228-8915-2
- The Encyclopedia of Beatles' People, Cassell Illustrated (1997) ISBN 978-0-7137-2606-0
- The Best Years of the Beatles (Harry & Pete Best) Headline Book Publishing (1997) ISBN 978-0-7472-7762-0
- Whatever Happened To ... : The Ultimate Pop and Rock Where Are They Now (Harry & Alan Clayson) Cassell Illustrated (1999) ISBN 978-0-7137-2675-6
- The Beatles Encyclopedia: Revised and Updated, Virgin Books (2000) ISBN 978-0-7535-0481-9
- The John Lennon Encyclopedia, Virgin Books (2001) ISBN 978-0-7535-3921-7
- The Paul McCartney Encyclopedia, Virgin Books (2002) ISBN 978-0-7535-0716-2
- The George Harrison Encyclopedia, Virgin Books (2003) ISBN 978-0-7535-0822-0
- The Ringo Starr Encyclopedia, Virgin Books (2004) ISBN 978-0-7535-0843-5
- The British Invasion: How the Beatles and Other UK Bands Conquered America, Chrome Dreams (2004) ISBN 978-1-84240-247-4
- Bigger Than the Beatles, Trinity Mirror (2009) ISBN 978-1-906802-04-2
- Lennon's Liverpool, Trinity Mirror (2010) ISBN 978-1-906802-51-6
- The Sixties (Harry & Robert Orbach) Endeavour London Ltd. (2011) ISBN 978-1-873913-78-9
- Love Me Do; Miniver Press. (2012) ASIN: B00993EROI
