= Ruthin School =

Former private school in Denbighshire, Wales

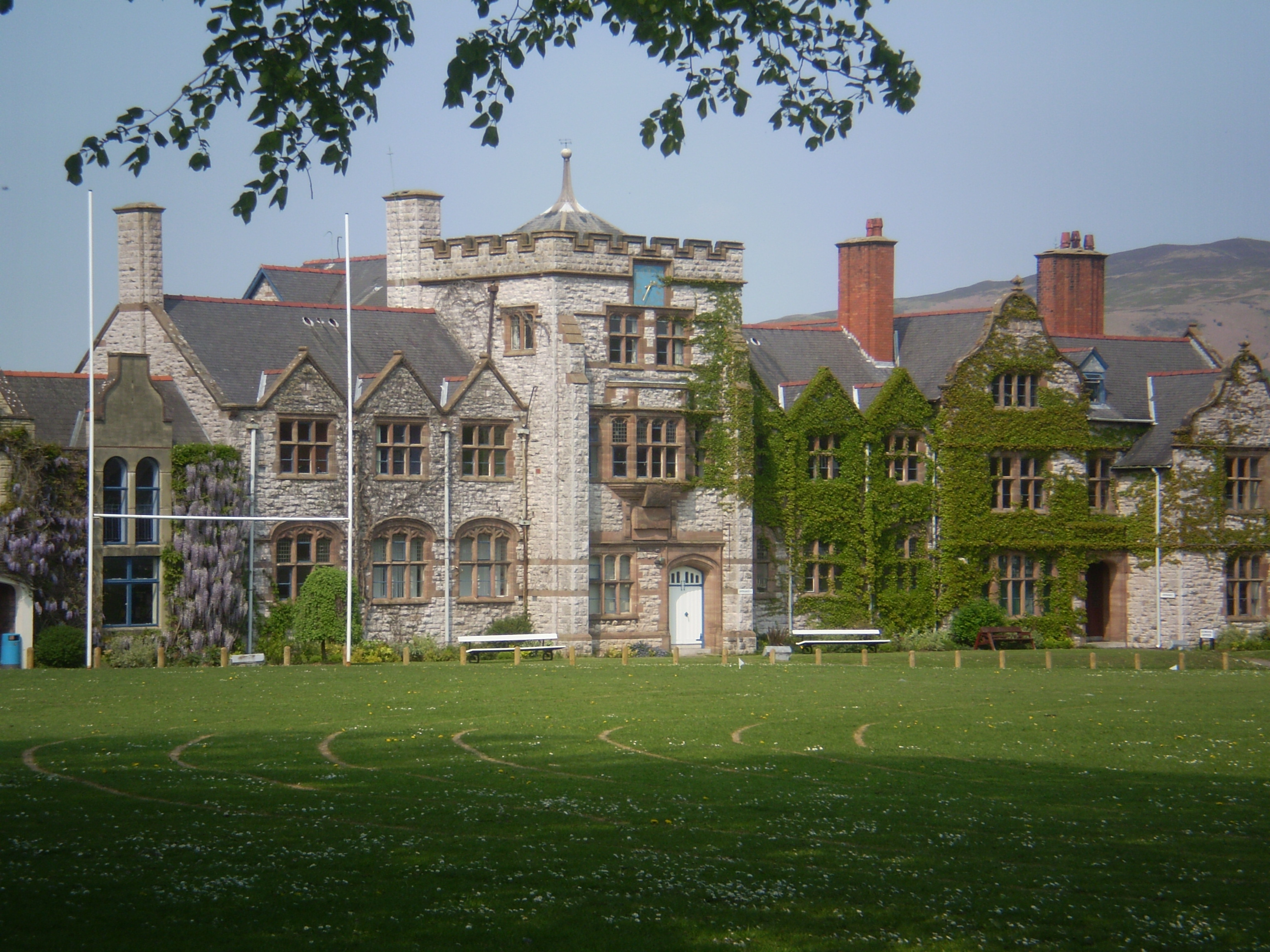
- Ruthin School's main building, opened in 1893

Location
- Mold Road; Ruthin, Denbighshire, LL15 1EE; Wales
- 53°06′53″N 3°17′59″W

Information
- Type: Private day & boarding
- Motto: Dei Gratia Sum Quod Sum (By the Grace of God I am What I am)
- Established: c. 1284; 742 years ago
- Founder: Gabriel Goodman
- Closed: 1 July 2026
- Local authority: Denbighshire
- Department for Education URN: 401976 Tables
- Gender: Coeducational
- Age range: 11 - 18
- Alumni: Old Ruthinians
- Website: http://www.ruthinschool.co.uk

Ruthin School was a private day and boarding school located on the outskirts of Ruthin, the county town of Denbighshire, North Wales. It was over seven hundred years old, making it one of the oldest schools in the United Kingdom. Originally a school for boys, it had been co-educational since 1990.

On 1st July 2026 the owners announced that the school would close at the end of the week, and that the operating company would enter administration following the end of term. Myddelton College in Denbigh said that it would offer a place to every Ruthin pupil for the following September.

== Education ==
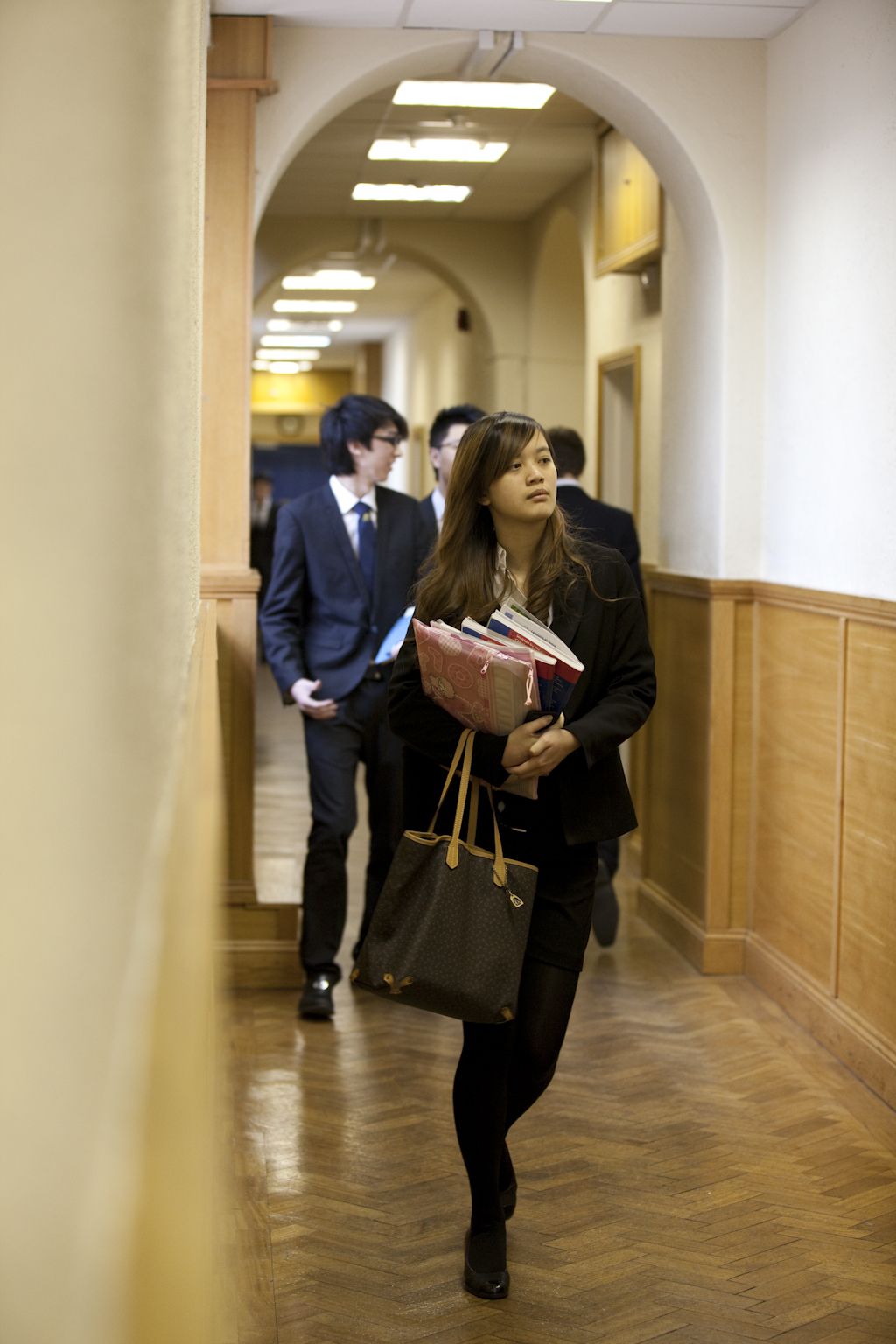
Inside the main building

In 2023, Ruthin School achieved 70% Grade A/A* in A-level. In the 2013 A Level results, 60.23% of grades attained by students at the school were A* or A. This figure was increased in 2016 to 76%, as well as a pass rate of 100%. 90% of 2017 university applications at the school were to Russell Group or top 20 universities. In 2017 the school had the 27th best A-level results of British independent schools.

The school won the 2016, 2017 and 2018 UKMT national mathematics competitions, resulting in their selection to represent the United Kingdom in Europe for three consecutive years. The school won the national Chemistry Analyst Competition in 2015, and has had gold award winning pupils in Olympiads for Mathematics, Physics and Chemistry every year in recent times.

According to the 2014 Estyn inspection report, English and mathematics at key stage four are well above Wales' average, and percentage of year 11 students achieving the level 2 threshold is also above the Welsh average. A* to C grades awarded for GCSE entries has improved and increased steadily for the past few years. Sixth Form students are at well above the Wales average at level 3, achieving good results in their A levels.

In 2025, 52% of A-level grades were A*–A and 74% were A*–B, with a 100% success rate for students applying to the University of Cambridge. At GCSE, 30% of grades were awarded at Grade 9 and 73% at Grade 9–7. In the same year, students progressed to Cambridge, UCL, Imperial College London, the University of Edinburgh, and international institutions including the University of Toronto and the Hong Kong University of Science and Technology.

In 2025, Ruthin School was named among the best independent schools in Wales by the Sunday Times Parent Power rankings.

In January 2026, five students received offers from the Universities of Oxford and Cambridge in a single admissions cycle, including offers to read Medicine, Computer Science and Natural Sciences at Cambridge, and two offers from Oxford.

== History ==
=== Beginnings ===
Ruthin School was founded in the wake of Edward I's conquest of Wales. Whilst the precise date of the foundation is not certain, Keith Thompson argues in his history of the school that 1284 is the most likely date and Reginald de Grey the most likely founder. In any event, it is clear from the Taxatio Ecclesiastica of 1291 that a collegiate church and school existed at Ruthin by that date.

Evidence of Ruthin School in the subsequent centuries is sparse. Surviving documents such as a Confirmatio of 1314/1315 which recognised the existence, rights and liberties of "collegio de Ruthin fundato per Reginald de Grey" indicate the existence of the School but nothing more is known of the size of the establishment.

Following Owain Glyndŵr's attack on Ruthin in September 1400, it appears that the collegiate church, and presumably also the school, continued to function unscathed until the dissolution of the former in 1535. Evidence for the school's continuation over the following decades is sketchy, but it is known that in 1561 the tithes of the sinecure of Llanelidan were applied to the use of the school, which suggests that pupils at that time would have been from local homes.

=== Re-foundation ===
In 1574, Gabriel Goodman, the Dean of Westminster and an Old Ruthinian, built a two-storey, limestone building to house the school in the shadow of the Church. The school appears to have prospered, and in 1595 Dean Goodman successfully petitioned Queen Elizabeth I to grant the tithes of Llanelidan to the school in perpetuity.

Following its refoundation, the grammar school educated the sons of local gentry, including the Grosvenor, Kenyon and Trevor families. Former pupils included Lloyd Kenyon, 1st Baron Kenyon and Sir John Trevor sometime Master of the Rolls and Speaker of the House of Commons.

Prior to the relocation, the Manorhaus was a boarding house for the school.

=== Relocation and twentieth-century ===
In 1893 the school moved from the immediate vicinity of the church to a building designed by John Douglas on its site on the eastern outskirts of the town. In 1923 Lord Kenyon opened the Memorial Cricket Pavilion to honour those Old Ruthinians who had died during the First World War.

As the century progressed, the demand for places increased, and in 1949 Bishop Wynne House was inaugurated. Just over a decade later, a new school hall comprising a refectory, kitchens, classrooms, and a theatre were constructed.

Expansion continued, and in 1971 a preparatory department was established in the former Archbishop Williams' house. The quatercentenary of the School's re-foundation was commemorated by the launch of plans for the construction of a new wing consisting of dormitories, a music room, classrooms, locker rooms and other facilities, plans which culminated in 1980.

The School's septcentenary was commemorated by a visit of Queen Elizabeth II, the School's Visitor, and the Duke of Edinburgh on 16 March 1984 when a clock in the central tower was unveiled.

=== Twenty-first century ===
On the hundredth anniversary of the school's relocation, the Hall was further extended and in 2006 the Hewer Hall, a sports facility, was opened by The Princess Royal.

==== Buyout ====
Ruthin School was acquired by Ruthin Education Limited, a new company formed in early 2023, with Chinese businesswoman and philanthropist Shangmei Gao leading the takeover, though she and other initial directors soon resigned from the specific school company, with the school's operations transferring to this new entity under a new board, maintaining its international focus, particularly strong ties with China, and its independent, co-educational status with new leadership.

== Controversies ==
=== Welsh language comments ===
In 2015, head teacher Toby Belfield wrote a letter to the Denbighshire Free Press, stating that teaching Welsh to children in Wales made them "academically weaker" than children in England and other countries. The comments led a sailing club to cut ties with the school. Belfield later apologised for any offence caused whilst also saying that he would "stand by" what he said and claiming that his words were taken out of context.

=== Leaked emails ===
The school attracted national attention in February 2017, after leaked emails from head teacher Toby Belfield (addressed to the students and parents) concerning a crackdown on behaviour caused controversy. The principal stated that he wished to expel students who engaged in romantic relationships and/or give them inferior references for university admissions, stating that he would "always" "definitely" give a worse reference; and that he would "not hesitate" to expel students who engaged in sexual activity. After the e-mails were released, Belfield released a contradictory statement that if the student was making high marks, he would not reduce the quality of his or her recommendations even if he or she was dating.

The emails also referenced Belfield's plans to expel 25-45 students to solve an overcrowding problem after accepting too many boarding pupils. He threatened to expel pupils for ordering takeaways, drinking alcohol (including adults who drank during school holidays), wearing short skirts (which he described as looking "like they are going to a nightclub"). and missing school due to sickness (which he described as "pathetic students pretending to be ill").

=== Sexual misconduct ===
It was discovered that head teacher Toby Belfield was trying to engage in relationships with several students after hundreds of sexualised text messages that he had sent to the school's female pupils emerged. He complimented his students' 'breasts' and asked about their 'virginities', as well as boasting about how he used to meet students abroad. The girls' ages ranged from 15 to 18. The extent of Belfield's grooming is still unknown, yet it is understood he sought to remain in contact with several female students after they had left school. Belfield was placed on leave at the end of 2019; he had already been suspended following an earlier investigation two years prior, but allowed to return to work.

=== Safeguarding shortfalls ===
In January 2020, following an unannounced inspection, Care Inspectorate Wales, which oversees the welfare and safeguarding of children, published a damning report on "inadequate" policies and procedures that are in breach of discrimination and human rights laws, stating "serious shortfalls" meant pupils are "not appropriately safeguarded". This included an incident of public humiliation of a student by a member of staff and the school's policy of excluding pupils with mental health issues, in breach of the Equality Act 2010.

A subsequent unannounced inspection by Care Inspectorate Wales in November 2025 found that all previous recommendations had been addressed, confirming that children are safe, happy, and well cared for. The inspection identified no areas for improvement and issued no Priority Action Notices or National Minimum Standards recommendations.

In the years following the 2020 inspection, Ruthin School introduced a number of changes to address safeguarding, governance, and academic provision. This included adjustments to pastoral structures and a review of leadership and operational procedures. The school has continued to deliver strong academic results and retains a significant international boarding population. More recent developments have included the introduction of additional subject options at GCSE and A Level, an expanded co-curricular programme, and ongoing work towards accreditation with High Performance Learning (HPL), an educational framework designed to support academic and personal development.

== Traditions ==
=== Church services ===
The school traditionally travelled to the Collegiate and Parochial Church of St Peter three times annually: once to mark Remembrance Day, once for a Christmas Carol Service, and once for Founder's Day.

=== Hill fort run ===
In the summer term there was an annual race from school to the summit of Moel Fenlli and back down again – a 7.5-mile (12.1 km) cross-country race in which school students and staff competed. The prize for the winner was a pot of marmalade, with trophies for the first boy and girl finishing in each age group.

== Notable alumni ==
- (1568) Richard Parry: Bishop of St Asaph, translator of the Welsh Bible
- (1589) Godfrey Goodman: Bishop of Gloucester
- (1590) John Williams: Dean of Westminster, Bishop of Lincoln, Lord Keeper of the Great Seal of England, Archbishop of York
- (1640) William Lloyd: Bishop of Llandaff; Bishop of Peterborough; Bishop of Norwich
- (1645) Sir John Trevor: Master of the Rolls; Speaker of the House of Commons; knight
- (1650) Thomas Lloyd: Deputy Governor of Pennsylvania
- (1675) John Wynne: Bishop of St Asaph; Bishop of Bath & Wells
- (c.1709) Sir Watkin Williams-Wynn, 3rd Baronet and 'Prince of Wales' (1693–1749) [in Peter DG Thomas' Politics in Eighteenth Century Wales (1998)]
- (1722) Josiah Tucker: Dean of Gloucester
- (1733) Richard Perryn: Baron of the Exchequer
- (1744) Lloyd Kenyon, 1st Baron Kenyon: Master of the Rolls; Lord Chief Justice of England
- (1851) Rowland Ellis: Bishop of Aberdeen and Orkney
- (1860) Elias Owen; Welsh international footballer
- (1886) Sir Lewis Casson: M.C.; actor and producer; knight
- (1935) Sir Ian Richmond: LL.D., F.S.A., F.B.A., Professor of Archaeology, University of Oxford; Fellow of All Souls; knight
- (1951) Neil Vernon-Roberts: Kenyan sports shooter
- (1954) Bob Barber: M.A., M.B.A., Test cricketer, captain of Lancashire and Warwickshire County Cricket Clubs
- (1964) Mike Roberts: Welsh international rugby union player
- (1980) Julian Lennon: Musician, photographer, and philanthropist

== See also ==
- List of the oldest schools in the United Kingdom
- List of non-ecclesiastical and non-residential works by John Douglas
