= Ye Cracke =

Pub in Liverpool, England

Coordinates: 53.400443°N 2.971963°W

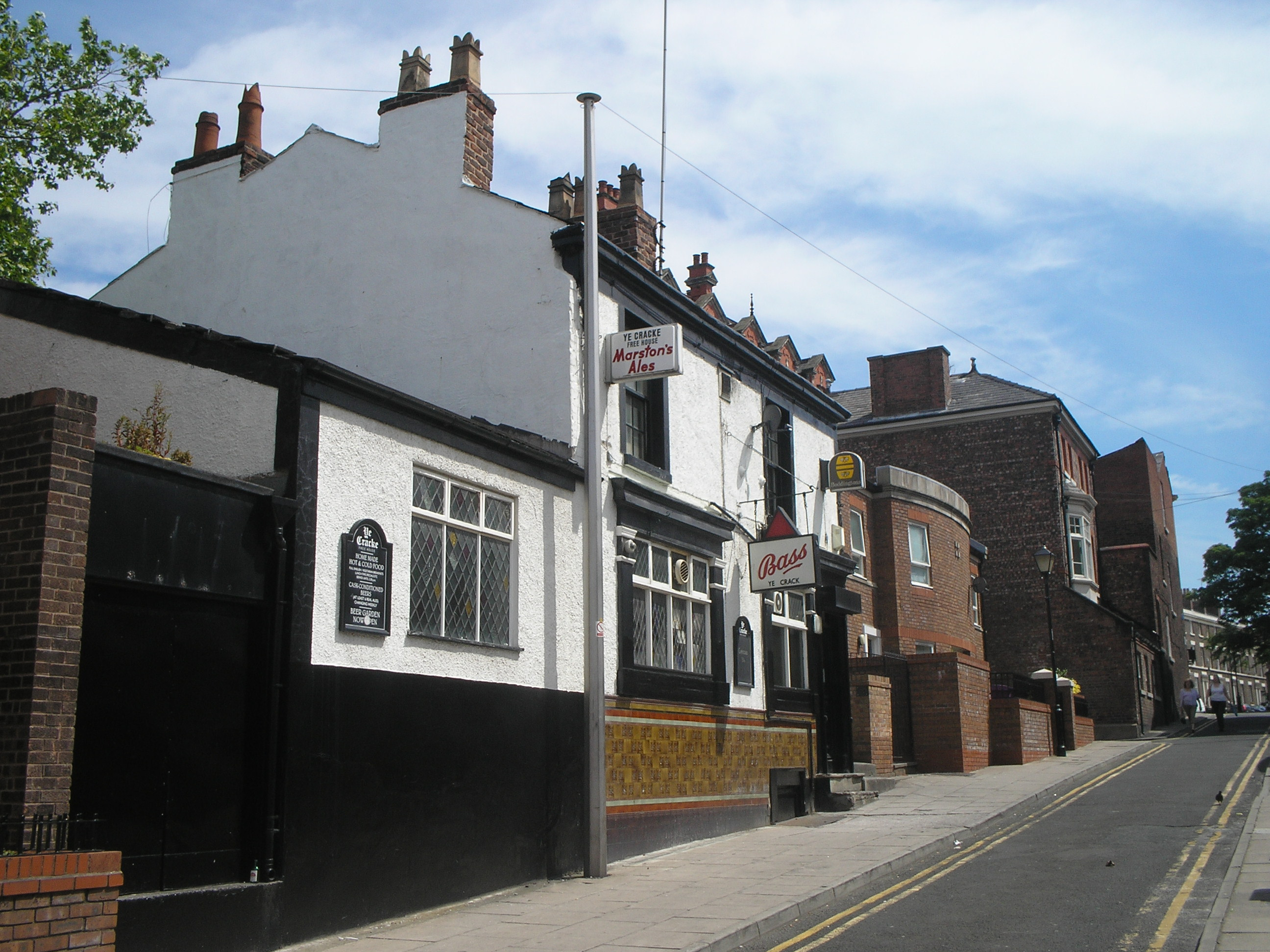
The pub in 2005

Ye Cracke is a 19th-century public house in Liverpool, England. It stands on Rice Street, a narrow offshoot of Hope Street, and takes its name from a Liverpudlian word for an alleyway. John Lennon and Stuart Sutcliffe were regulars here when they studied at the nearby art college, and it was here that Lennon courted his first wife, Cynthia Powell.
