= The Beatles in film =

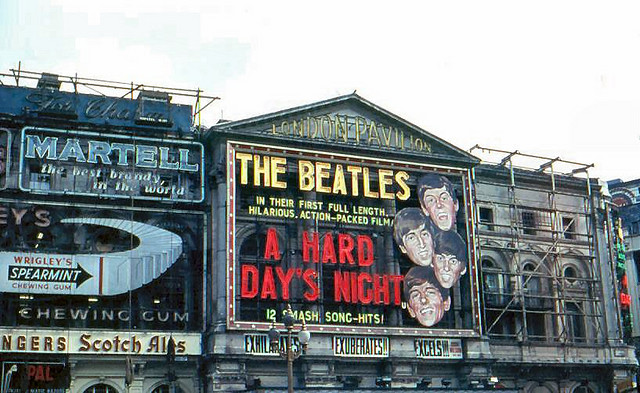
The London Pavilion screening A Hard Day's Night (1964)

The Beatles were an English rock band formed in Liverpool in 1960. With a line-up comprising John Lennon, Paul McCartney, George Harrison and Ringo Starr, they are commonly regarded as the most influential band of all time. Between 1964 and 1970, they appeared in five major motion pictures, beginning with A Hard Day's Night (1964) and ending with Let It Be (1970). From late 1965 to 1969, the group also appeared in several promotional films for their singles, which have been credited with anticipating music videos and the rise of MTV in the 1980s.

During the years of Beatlemania (ca.1963–1966), the Beatles appeared in two films, A Hard Day's Night (1964) and Help! (1965), both directed by American director Richard Lester. A Hard Day's Night was shot in black and white and featured the band as fictionalised versions of themselves during the height of Beatlemania, while Help! was shot in colour and saw the group struggle to record music while trying to protect Starr from a sinister cult and a pair of mad scientists, all of whom are obsessed with obtaining one of his rings. Following the recording of Sgt. Pepper's Lonely Hearts Club Band (1967), the Beatles produced and starred in their third major feature, Magical Mystery Tour (1967), a mostly unscripted television film which saw the group and friends on a British mystery tour. The band cameoed in the animated Yellow Submarine (1968), which featured cartoon versions of the band members and a soundtrack that included then-unreleased studio recordings. The band's final major film was Let It Be (1970), which documented the group rehearsing and recording songs for the eponymous album.

Most of their films were very well-received, except Magical Mystery Tour which was panned by critics and the public alike. Each of their films had the same name as their associated soundtrack album and a song on that album. The individual Beatles also had their own film careers outside the band to varying degrees: Starr became a successful actor, Harrison became a successful producer with his production company HandMade Films, McCartney appeared in three films and Lennon had a co-starring role in How I Won the War (1967). The Beatles have also been the subject of numerous documentary films, have been portrayed onscreen in both film and television, and have inspired other films.

== Films starring the Beatles ==
=== A Hard Day's Night ===
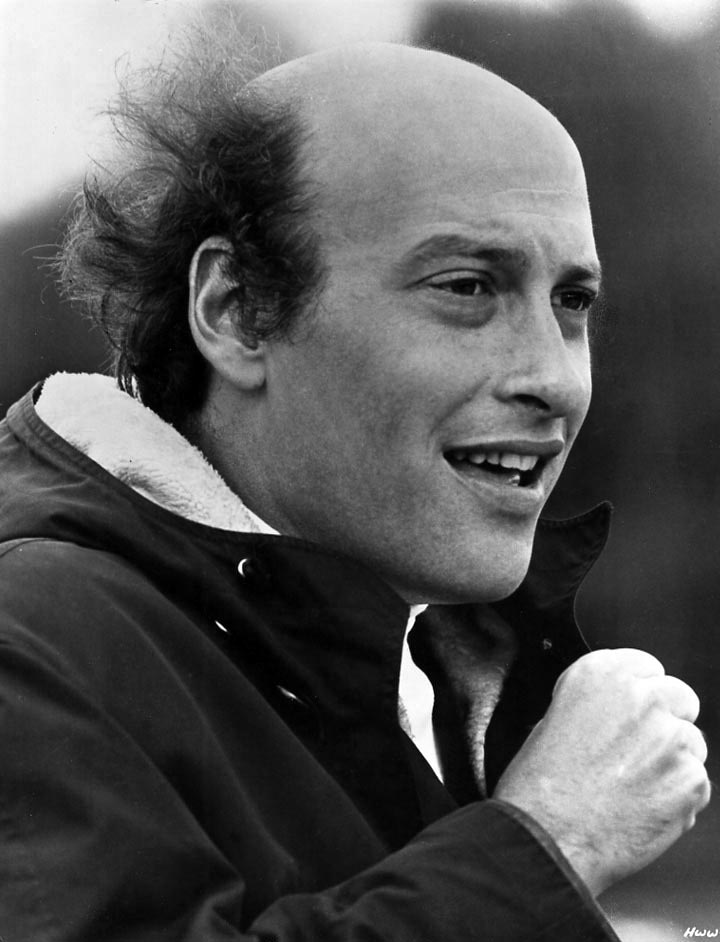
Richard Lester, the director of A Hard Day's Night and Help!

A Hard Day's Night was the Beatles' first major film. Shot in black and white, the film focused on fictionalised versions of the band during Beatlemania and the band's hectic touring lifestyle. It was directed by the up-and-coming American director Richard Lester, who was known for having directed a television version of the successful BBC radio series The Goon Show as well as the off-beat short film The Running, Jumping and Standing Still Film, with Peter Sellers and Spike Milligan. A Hard Day's Night is a mockumentary of the four members as they make their way to a London television programme. It created a lasting impression of their individual personas. Lennon became known as "the smart one", McCartney "the cute one", Harrison "the quiet one", and Starr "the lucky one". Starr's personality as the band's affable, self-deprecating drummer proved especially popular with fans and the press in the US. The film also starred Wilfrid Brambell as Paul's grandfather John McCartney, Norman Rossington as their manager Norm, and John Junkin as Shake, their road manager.

A Hard Day's Night was released in 1964 at the height of Beatlemania and was very well received by critics, and remains one of the most influential jukebox musicals. The film broke new ground in the field of British and American musical feature films, particularly in its abandoning of the genre's standard rags-to-riches premise for a comedic presentation of the artists playing themselves. Film historian Stephen Glynn describes it as "the canonical pop music film". He highlights the innovative techniques Lester uses in the sequence for "Can't Buy Me Love", as does Saul Austerlitz, who deems it the precursor to the modern music video.

=== Help! ===
Help! was the Beatles' second major film. Directed again by Richard Lester, it was the group's first film shot in colour. It starred the Beatles, Eleanor Bron, Leo McKern, Victor Spinetti and Roy Kinnear. In Help!, the Beatles struggle to record their new album while trying to protect Starr from a sinister eastern cult (a parody of the Thuggee cult) and a pair of mad scientists, all of whom are obsessed with obtaining a sacrificial ring that Starr secretly acquired through a fan letter by the victim. Like A Hard Day's Night, the group performs several songs in the film that appear on their soundtrack album of the same name. It was shot in exotic locations, including Salisbury Plain, with Stonehenge visible in the background, the Bahamas, Salzburg and the Austrian Alps.

With Help!, Lester presented the Beatles in "one of the central surrealist texts" of the 1960s, according to Bray. The film uses pop art visuals and satirises James Bond films, particularly the latter's depiction of the British Secret Service as an efficiently run organisation, and one enjoying a level of influence equal to its US counterpart in their shared operations. Released in 1965, Help! was greeted with positive reviews but was not as well-received as A Hard Day's Night; nevertheless, the film is retrospectively regarded as being very influential, including in the subsequent development of music videos. It is described by Glynn as "the colonial pop music film" for its conveying of the "clear racial undertones" and imperialism evident in Bond films from the period, and the clash that results with the Beatles' Swinging London personas. In addition to inspiring the Monkees' self-titled television show, the film influenced the 1960s Batman TV series.

=== Magical Mystery Tour ===
Magical Mystery Tour was the Beatles' third major film. Unlike the previous two, it was a television film and not a feature film, with a running time of less than an hour. The film follows a group of people on a British mystery tour in a 1967 coach, primarily focusing on Ringo Starr and his recently widowed Aunt Jessie (Jessie Robins). During the course of the tour, "strange things begin to happen" at the whim of "four or five magicians", four of whom are played by the Beatles themselves and the fifth by the band's long-time road manager Mal Evans. The film is interspersed with musical interludes, which include the Beatles performing "I Am the Walrus" and "The Fool on the Hill", Harrison singing "Blue Jay Way" while waiting on Blue Jay Way Road, and ending with the Beatles dressed in white dinner jackets, highlighting a glamorous old-style dance crowd scene, accompanied by the song "Your Mother Should Know".

The idea for the film was essentially McCartney's, which was thought up as he returned from a trip to the US in the late spring of 1967, and was loosely inspired by press coverage McCartney had read about Ken Kesey's Merry Pranksters' LSD-fueled American bus odyssey. McCartney felt inspired to take this idea and blend it with the peculiarly English working class tradition of charabanc mystery tours, in which children took chaperoned bus rides through the English countryside, destination unknown.

Magical Mystery Tour was broadcast in the UK on BBC1 on 26 December (Boxing Day), but in black and white rather than colour. It was the Beatles' first critical failure. As a result of the unfavourable reviews, networks in the US declined to show the film there. Beatles' management team member Peter Brown blamed McCartney for its failure. Brown said that during a private screening for management staff, the reaction had been "unanimous ... it was awful", yet McCartney was convinced that the film would be warmly received, and ignored Brown's advice to scrap the project and save the band from embarrassment.

=== Yellow Submarine ===
In 1968, United Artists released the animated musical fantasy film Yellow Submarine, which featured cartoon versions of the band members, voiced by actors. Other than a live-action cameo at the end of the film, the Beatles had little direct input in the film. Instead, the group contributed four previously unreleased songs that made their debut in the film. These included "All Together Now", "Hey Bulldog" and Harrison's "Only a Northern Song" and "It's All Too Much". It was acclaimed for its music, humour and innovative visual style. The Beatles are said to have been pleased with the result and attended its highly publicised London premiere.

The film's soundtrack album, released in early 1969, featured the four previously unreleased songs, two previously released songs: "Yellow Submarine" and "All You Need Is Love" and a re-recording of the film's orchestral soundtrack by producer George Martin. Numerous songs from the film were later remixed and released on the Yellow Submarine Songtrack in 1999. Yellow Submarine provided a revolution in animated film and allowed animators to fully express ideas using psychedelic visuals. It marked a departure from the confines of Disney's productions and was credited with saving the feature-length animated film.

=== Let It Be ===
Let It Be was the Beatles' final major feature film. Directed by Michael Lindsay-Hogg, it is a documentary film that documents the group rehearsing and recording songs for their twelfth and final studio album Let It Be. It was shot over a four-week period in January 1969, and includes an unannounced rooftop concert by the group, which was their last public performance. The documentary — originally intended to be a chronicle of the evolution of an album and the band's possible return to live performances — captured the prevailing tensions between the band members, which would ultimately lead to their break-up.

Let It Be observes the Beatles from a "fly on the wall" perspective, without narration, scene titles, or interviews with the main subjects. The first portion of the film shows the band rehearsing on a sound stage at Twickenham Film Studios. The songs are works in progress, with a heated exchange between McCartney and Harrison while recording "Two of Us" shown. Also present are Mal Evans and Yoko Ono, who's at Lennon's side at all times. The group is then shown arriving individually at Apple headquarters, where they record several songs, some complete and some works-in-progress. Complete performances of "Two of Us", "Let It Be", and "The Long and Winding Road" are also shown. The film's final portion shows the Beatles and Billy Preston giving an unannounced concert from the headquarters rooftop. They perform "Get Back", "Don't Let Me Down", "I've Got a Feeling", "One After 909" and "Dig a Pony", intercut with reactions and comments from surprised Londoners gathering on the streets below, before being shut down by the police.

The band initially rejected both the film and the album, instead recording and issuing the Abbey Road album. But with a large investment spent on the project, it was decided to finish and release the film and album (the latter with considerable post-production by Phil Spector) in the spring of 1970. When the film released in May 1970, it was after the group's breakup was announced, which gave the film's depiction of the band's acrimony and attempts to recapture the group's spirit a significant poignancy.

=== Individual projects ===
In late 1966, following the Beatles' cease in touring and before the recording sessions for Sgt. Pepper's Lonely Hearts Club Band, Lennon took time off to play a supporting character, Gripweed, in Richard Lester's How I Won the War. A satire of World War II films, the film's dry, ironic British humour was not well received by American audiences. Lennon would later produce avant-garde films with his second wife Yoko Ono, such as Rape which was produced for the Austrian television network ORF. A new documentary about Lennon and Ono's life in 1972, One to One: John and Yoko, by director Kevin Macdonald using archival material and concert footage, was released in April 2025.

In addition to his roles in the Beatles' films, Starr has received praise from critics and film industry professionals regarding his acting; director and producer Walter Shenson called him "a superb actor, an absolute natural". By the mid-1960s, Starr had become a connoisseur of film. Starr has acted in Candy (1968), The Magic Christian (1969), Blindman (1971), Son of Dracula (1974) and Caveman (1981). In 1971, he starred as Larry the Dwarf in Frank Zappa's 200 Motels and was featured in Harry Nilsson's animated film The Point! He then co-starred in That'll Be the Day (1973) as a Teddy Boy and appeared in The Last Waltz, the Martin Scorsese documentary film about the 1976 farewell concert of the Band. Starr played the Pope in Ken Russell's Lisztomania (1975), and later appeared as himself and a downtrodden alter-ego Ognir Rrats in Ringo (1978), an American-made television comedy film based loosely on The Prince and the Pauper. For the 1979 documentary film on the Who, The Kids Are Alright, Starr appeared in interview segments with fellow drummer Keith Moon.

Harrison achieved success as a film producer. He helped finance Ravi Shankar's documentary Raga and released it through Apple Films in 1971. He also produced, with Apple manager Allen Klein, the Concert for Bangladesh film. In 1973, he produced the feature film Little Malcolm, but the project was lost amid the litigation surrounding the former Beatles ending their business ties with Klein. In 1978, in an effort to produce Monty Python's Life of Brian, he and Denis O'Brien formed the production company HandMade Films. Harrison financed the production of Life of Brian in part by mortgaging his home, which Eric Idle later called "the most anybody's ever paid for a cinema ticket in history". Harrison would later produce Time Bandits (1981), which featured a new song by Harrison, "Dream Away"; Mona Lisa (1986); Shanghai Surprise (1986); Withnail and I (1987) and made cameo appearances in several of these films, including as a reporter in All You Need Is Cash and as a nightclub singer in Shanghai Surprise, for which he recorded five new songs.

McCartney appeared in a cameo role in Peter Richardson's 1987 film Eat the Rich and released his own film Give My Regards to Broad Street in 1984 in which Starr co-starred as a fictionalised version of himself. He also appeared in the 2017 film Pirates of the Caribbean: Dead Men Tell No Tales, as a character named Uncle Jack.

=== Unmade films ===
During the 1960s, there were many ideas pitched for films, but these were either rejected or never saw the light of day; such projects included A Talent for Loving, a Western film written by Richard Condon; Shades of a Personality; film versions of The Lord of the Rings (quickly deep-sixed by J.R.R. Tolkien), and The Three Musketeers starring the group (Richard Lester, who directed the group's first two films, went on to direct The Three Musketeers without the Beatles' involvement); and a script by playwright Joe Orton called Up Against It. Throughout the 1980s, a hand-drawn animated film titled Strawberry Fields (also referred to as Strawberry Fields Forever) was in development. The project was spearheaded by Yellow Submarine producer Al Brodax, who hired animator Jeff Merghart to do character designs. The film was meant to also utilize computer animation. Other reports indicate that Michael Jackson approached Don Bluth with the notion to make the film after acquiring the rights to the catalog. Ultimately, the project was canceled when the production team discovered that Brodax did not have the rights to use the band's catalog of songs. Sketches of the main and supporting characters by Merghart were discovered in 2019, and 30 minutes of test footage was uploaded to the Internet Archive in 2024. Robert Zemeckis was planning a remake of the film Yellow Submarine with motion capture technology but it was cancelled in 2011.

== Videography ==
=== Fictional films ===
Title	Details	Director
A Hard Day's Night	Released: 6 July 1964; Distributor: United Artists	Richard Lester
Help!	Released: 29 July 1965; Distributor: United Artists	Richard Lester
Magical Mystery Tour (Note: Magical Mystery Tour was certified gold by the Recording Industry Association of America in January 2015)	Released: 26 December 1967; Broadcaster: BBC1 (UK); Distributor: New Line Cinema (US)	The Beatles, Bernard Knowles (uncredited)
Yellow Submarine	Released: 17 July 1968; Distributor: United Artists	George Dunning

=== Concert films, TV specials and documentaries ===
Title	Details	Director
The Beatles Washington D.C. Concert (Note: The Beatles Washington D.C. Concert was re-released on 16 November 2010 as Live at the Washington Coliseum, 1964 exclusively on iTunes with The Beatles Box Set.)	Released: 14 & 15 March 1964; Distributor: NGP	CBS film crew
Around the Beatles (Note: Around the Beatles was included on the home video release The Beatles Live: Ready Steady Go! – Special Edition in 1985.)	Released: 6 May 1964; Broadcaster: ITV	Rita Gillespie
The Beatles in Nederland	Released: 8 June 1964; Broadcaster: Nederland 1 (NETHERLANDS)	Unknown
What's Happening! The Beatles in the U.S.A. (Note: What's Happening! The Beatles in the U.S.A. was re-edited and re-released on 13 November 1991 as The Beatles: The First U.S. Visit by MPI Home Video.)	Released: 14 December 1964; Broadcaster: CBS	Albert and David Maysles
Les Beatles	Broadcast: 31 October 1965; Broadcaster: Channel 2 (FRANCE)	Jean-Christophe Averty
The Beatles at Shea Stadium (Note: The Beatles' performance in The Beatles at Shea Stadium was restored and released theatrically in 2016 with The Beatles: Eight Days a Week – The Touring Years.)	Released: 1 March 1966; Broadcaster: BBC1 (UK), ABC (US)	various
The Beatles in Japan (Note: The Beatles' performance in The Beatles in Japan was first released on video in 1984 as Concert at Budokan 1966.)	Released: 1 July 1966; Broadcaster: Nippon TV (JAPAN)	various
Let It Be	Released: 13 May 1970; Distributor: United Artists	Michael Lindsay-Hogg
A Salute to the Beatles: Once upon a Time	Released: 21 May 1975; Broadcaster: ABC (US)	David Frost (presenter)
The Compleat Beatles	Released: 28 May 1982; Broadcaster: PBS (US); Distributor: MGM	Patrick Montgomery
It Was Twenty Years Ago Today	Released: 1 June 1987; Broadcaster: Granada Television (UK)	John Sheppard
The Beatles Anthology	Broadcast: 19–23 November 1995; Broadcaster: ITV (UK), ABC (US)	Geoff Wonfor, Bob Smeaton
All Together Now	Released: 20 October 2008; Distributor: Cinema Management Group	Adrian Wills
The Beatles: Eight Days a Week	Released: 15 September 2016; Distributor: StudioCanal, PolyGram Entertainment (UK), Abramorama, Hulu (US)	Ron Howard
The Beatles: Get Back	Released: 25, 26 & 27 November 2021; Distributor: Walt Disney Studios Motion Pictures, Disney+	Peter Jackson
Beatles '64	Released: 29 November 2024; Distributor: Disney+	David Tedeschi

=== Home videos ===
Title	Details	Director
Concert at Budokan 1966	Released: 1984; Re-released: 1993; Distributor: VAP (JAPAN); Formats: VHS, Laserdisc	Nippon TV
The Beatles Live: Ready Steady Go! – Special Edition	Released: 1985; Re-released: 1995; Distributor: Picture Music International, Sony Pictures Home Entertainment; Formats: Beta, VHS, Laserdisc	Rita Gillespie
The Beatles: The First U.S. Visit	Released: 13 November 1991; Re-released: 1998, 2003, 2004; Distributor: MPI Home Video, Apple Films; Formats: VHS, Laserdisc, DVD	Kathy Dougherty, Susan Frömke, Albert Maysles
The Beatles Collection: Help!; Magical Mystery Tour; The Beatles: The First U.S. Visit; You Can't Do That! The Making of A Hard Day's Night	Released: 7 February 1994; Re-release: 8 August 2000; Distributor: MPI Home Video, Apple Films; Formats: 4xVHS, 4xDVD	various
You Can't Do That! The Making of A Hard Day's Night	Released: 28 March 1995; Distributor: MPI Home Video, Apple Films, EMI Video; Formats: VHS, Laserdisc, VCD	David Leaf
The Beatles Anthology	Released: 5 September 1996 (VHS, available as eight individual volumes or one 8xVHS box set); Re-release: 31 March 2003 (5xDVD, all eight volumes on four DVDs plus fifth DVD of extras); Distributor: Apple, EMI; Format: 8xVHS, 5xDVD	Geoff Wonfor, Bob Smeaton
The Four Complete Historic Ed Sullivan Shows Featuring The Beatles	Released: 28 October 2003; Re-release: 7 September 2010; Distributor: SOFA Home Entertainment, Eagle Vision, UMe, Hip-O Records; Format: 2xDVD	Kenneth Whelan
The Beatles Stereo Box: The Mini Documentaries	Released: 9 September 2009; Distributor: Apple Corps. Ltd. / iTunes; Formats: DVD, digital download	
The Beatles Box Set: Live at the Washington Coliseum, 1964	Released: 16 November 2010; Distributor: Apple Corps. Ltd. / iTunes; Formats: Digital download	
1+	Released: 6 November 2015; Distributor: Apple Corps. Ltd.; Formats: DVD, CD/DVD, CD/2xDVD, Blu-ray, CD/Blu-ray, CD/2xBlu-ray	various

=== TV series ===
Title	Details	Creator
The Beatles	Broadcast: 25 September 1965 – 21 October 1967 (Note: Repeat broadcasts continued until 9 May 1969.); Broadcaster: ABC (US)	Al Brodax, Sylban Buck

=== Other TV appearances ===
Date	Title	Songs	Notes
22 August 1962	Know the North	"Some Other Guy"	Filmed at the Cavern Club in Liverpool, two takes both of which still survive
17 October 1962	People and Places	"Some Other Guy" and "Love Me Do"	Footage now lost
4 December 1962	Tuesday Rendezvous	"Love Me Do" and "P.S. I Love You"	Footage now lost
13 January 1963	Thank Your Lucky Stars	"Please Please Me"	Footage now lost
17 February 1963	Thank Your Lucky Stars	"Please Please Me"	Footage now lost
14 April 1963	Thank Your Lucky Stars	"From Me To You"	Footage now lost
12 May 1963	Thank Your Lucky Stars	"From Me To You"	Footage now lost
16 May 1963	Pops and Lenny	"Please Please Me" and "From Me To You"	Existing footage incomplete
22 June 1963	Juke Box Jury	–	John on the panel, footage now lost though incomplete audio of the episode still survives
23 June 1963	Lucky Stars Summer Spin	"From Me to You" and "I Saw Her Standing There"	Footage now lost
14 August 1963	Scene at 6:30	"Twist and Shout"	Footage still survives, included on 1+
18 August 1963	Lucky Stars Summer Spin	"She Loves You" and "I'll Get You"	Footage now lost
22 August 1963	Day by Day	"She Loves You"	Footage now lost
27 August 1963	The Mersey Sound	"Twist And Shout", "She Loves You" and "Love Me Do"	Footage still survives, "Love Me Do" included on 1+
1 September 1963	Big Night Out	"From Me to You", "She Loves You", "Twist and Shout" and "I Saw Her Standing There"	Footage still survives
4 October 1963	Ready Steady Go!	"Twist and Shout", "She Loves You" and "I'll Get You"	Footage still survives
13 October 1963	Sunday Night at the London Palladium	"From Me to You", "I'll Get You", "She Loves You" and "Twist and Shout"	Footage now lost, audio of "I'll Get You" included on The Beatles Anthology 1 album
20 October 1963	Thank Your Lucky Stars	"All My Loving", "Money (That's What I Want)" and "She Loves You"	"All My Loving" and "Money" still survive, "She Loves You" now lost
30 October 1963	Drop In	"She Loves You", "Twist and Shout", "I Saw Her Standing There" and "Long Tall Sally"	Footage still survives, "She Loves You" included on 1+
4 November 1963	The Royal Variety Performance	"From Me to You", "She Loves You", "Till There Was You" and "Twist and Shout"	Footage still survives, " From Me to You" included on 1+, audio of all except "From Me to You" included on The Beatles Anthology 1 album
25 November 1963	Late Scene Extra	"I Want to Hold Your Hand" and "This Boy"	Footage still survives, " I Want to Hold Your Hand" included on 1+
2 December 1963	Two of a Kind	"This Boy", "All My Loving" and "I Want to Hold Your Hand"	Footage still survives, audio of all except "All My Loving" included on The Beatles Anthology 1 album (including interview and "Moonlight Bay" skit with hosts Morecambe and Wise)
7 December 1963	Juke Box Jury	–	All four Beatles on the panel, footage now lost though audio of complete episode survives
15 December 1963	Thank Your Lucky Stars	"I Want to Hold Your Hand", "All My Loving", "Twist and Shout" and "She Loves You"	Footage now lost
12 January 1964	Sunday Night at the London Palladium	"I Want to Hold Your Hand", "This Boy", "All My Loving", "Money (That's What I Want)" and "Twist and Shout"	Footage now lost
9 February 1964	The Ed Sullivan Show	"Please Please Me", "Twist and Shout", "All My Loving", "Till There Was You", "She Loves You", "I Saw Her Standing There" and "I Want to Hold Your Hand"	Footage still survives, "Please Please Me" and "Twist and Shout" were filmed earlier in the day and broadcast on a later episode, remaining tracks broadcast live, "Please Please Me" included on 1+, audio of "All My Loving" included on The Beatles Anthology 1 album
16 February 1964	The Ed Sullivan Show	"She Loves You", "This Boy", "All My Loving", I Saw Her Standing There", "From Me to You" and "I Want to Hold Your Hand"	Footage still survives
23 February 1964	Big Night Out	"All My Loving", "I Wanna Be Your Man", "Till There Was You", "Please Mr. Postman", "Money (That's What I Want)" and "I Want To Hold Your Hand"	Footage still survives
20 March 1964	Ready Steady Go!	"It Won't Be Long", "Can't Buy Me Love" and "You Can't Do That"	Footage still survives
25 March 1964	Top of the Pops	"Can't Buy Me Love" and "You Can't Do That"	Existing footage incomplete and silent
15 April 1964	A Degree of Frost	–	Interview with Paul, footage still survives
17 April 1964	The Ed Sullivan Show	–	Interview on the set of A Hard Day's Night, footage still survives
7 July 1964	Top of the Pops	"A Hard Day's Night", "Things We Said Today" and "Long Tall Sally"	Footage now lost
11 July 1964	Lucky Stars Summer Spin	"A Hard Day's Night", "Long Tall Sally", "Things We Said Today" and "You Can't Do That"	Footage now lost
19 July 1964	Blackpool Night Out	"A Hard Day's Night", "Things We Said Today", "You Can't Do That", "If I Fell" and "Long Tall Sally"	Existing footage incomplete
25 July 1964	Juke Box Jury	–	George on the panel, footage now lost
1 August 1964	Juke Box Jury	–	Ringo on the panel, footage now lost
27 September 1964	It's Beat Time!	–	Ringo and Brian Epstein on the panel, footage now lost
3 October 1964	Shindig!	"Kansas City/Hey! Hey! Hey! Hey!", "Boys" and "I'm a Loser"	Footage still survives
14 October 1964	Scene at 6:30	"I Should Have Known Better"	Footage still survives
21 November 1964	Thank Your Lucky Stars	"I Feel Fine", "She's a Woman" and "Rock and Roll Music"	Footage still survives
23 November 1964	Ready Steady Go!	"I Feel Fine", "She's A Woman", "Baby's in Black" and "Kansas City/Hey! Hey! Hey! Hey!"	Footage still survives
8 January 1965	Not Only... But Also	–	John and Dudley Moore recite extracts from In His Own Write, footage still survives
28 March 1965	Thank Your Lucky Stars	"Ticket to Ride", "Yes It Is" and "Eight Days a Week"	Footage now lost
10 April 1965	Top Of the Pops	"Ticket to Ride" and "Yes It Is"	Existing "Ticket to Ride" footage incomplete, "Yes It Is" completely lost
11 April 1965	The Eamonn Andrews Show	"Ticket to Ride" and "Yes It Is"	Footage now lost though audio of complete episode survives
16 April 1965	Ready Steady Go!	–	Interview with George and John, footage now lost
18 June 1965	Tonight	–	John interviewed about A Spaniard in the Works and reads extracts, footage still survives
1 August 1965	Blackpool Night Out	"I Feel Fine", "I'm Down", "Act Naturally", "Ticket to Ride", "Yesterday" and "Help!"	Footage still survives, audio of all except "I'm Down" and "Act Naturally" included on The Beatles Anthology 2 album
14 August 1965	The Ed Sullivan Show	"I Feel Fine", "I'm Down", "Act Naturally", "Ticket To Ride", "Yesterday" and "Help!"	Footage still survives, "Yesterday" included on 1+
1 November 1965	The Music of Lennon & McCartney	"Day Tripper", "We Can Work It Out" and "Yesterday"	Footage still survives, "Yesterday" performed by Paul and Marianne Faithfull, "Day Tripper" included on 1+
16 June 1966	Top of the Pops	"Paperback Writer" and "Rain"	Existing footage incomplete and silent
26 December 1966	Not Only... But Also	–	John appears in a sketch as Dan, the doorman of the Ad Lav nightclub
18 January 1967	Scene Special	–	Interview with Paul, footage still survives
25 June 1967	Our World	"All You Need Is Love"	Footage still survives, included on 1+
29 September 1967	The Frost Programme	–	Interview with George and John, footage now lost though complete audio of the episode survives
4 October 1967	The Frost Programme	–	Follow-up interview with George and John, footage still survives
27 December 1967	The Frost Programme	–	Interview with Paul, footage now lost though audio of complete episode survives
6 February 1968	Cilla	–	Ringo appeared in several sketches, footage now lost
14 May 1968	The Tonight Show	–	Interview with John and Paul, footage now lost though complete audio of the episode survives
23 May 1968	All My Loving	–	Interviews with Paul, Ringo, George Martin, Derek Taylor and Louise Harrison (George's mother), footage still survives
24 August 1968	Frost on Sunday	–	Interview with John and Yoko Ono, footage still survives
4 September 1968	Frost on Sunday	"Hey Jude"	Footage still survives
17 November 1968	The Smothers Brothers Comedy Hour		Interview with George, footage still survives
14 June 1969	The David Frost Show	–	Interview with John and Yoko Ono, footage still survives
2 December 1969	John Lennon: Man of the Decade	–	Documentary with exclusive interviews, footage still survives
14 June 1992	The South Bank Show	–	Documentary on the Sgt. Pepper's Lonely Hearts Club Band album, includes exclusive interviews with George, Paul, Ringo, George Martin, David Mason, Peter Blake, Brian Wilson and Phil Collins

=== 1960s promotional films ===
Starting with "Day Tripper" and "We Can Work It Out" in late 1965, the band filmed promotional clips for their singles to circumvent the industry norm of having to make numerous personal appearances on television shows. They continued to make promotional clips for most of their singles until 1969, the final being Harrison's "Something". The Beatles' promotional clips anticipated the music video and the rise of MTV in the 1980s. All of their promotional films were remastered and released on 1+ in 2015.

Song	Year	Director	Description
"Day Tripper"	1965	Joseph McGrath	The Beatles filmed three promotional clips each for "Day Tripper" and "We Can Work It Out" at Twickenham Film Studios in south-west London on 23 November. In all three for "We Can Work It Out", Lennon was seated at a harmonium. The most frequently broadcast of the three was a straightforward performance piece with the group wearing black suits. Another clip shows the group wearing the stage suits from their Shea Stadium performance. The third clip opens with a still photograph of Lennon with a sunflower in front of his eye.
"We Can Work It Out"	1965	Joseph McGrath	
"I Feel Fine"	1965	Joseph McGrath	During the filming of "Day Tripper" and "We Can Work It Out", the Beatles filmed promotional films for previous singles "I Feel Fine", "Ticket to Ride" and "Help!" for inclusion in Top of the Pops' round-up of the biggest hits of 1965.
"Ticket to Ride"	1965	Joseph McGrath	During the filming of "Day Tripper" and "We Can Work It Out", the Beatles filmed promotional films for previous singles "I Feel Fine", "Ticket to Ride" and "Help!" for inclusion in Top of the Pops' round-up of the biggest hits of 1965.
"Help!"	1965	Joseph McGrath	During the filming of "Day Tripper" and "We Can Work It Out", the Beatles filmed promotional films for previous singles "I Feel Fine", "Ticket to Ride" and "Help!" for inclusion in Top of the Pops' round-up of the biggest hits of 1965.
"Rain"	1966	Michael Lindsay-Hogg	The Beatles created three promotional films for "Rain". One features the Beatles walking and singing in a garden and a greenhouse at Chiswick House in west London while the other two feature the band performing on a sound stage (filmed 19 May 1966, one in colour for The Ed Sullivan Show and the other in black and white for British television).
"Paperback Writer"	1966	Michael Lindsay-Hogg	Four promotional films for "Paperback Writer" were shot on 19 and 20 May 1966. On the first day, they recorded a colour performance at EMI Studios, for The Ed Sullivan Show, and two black and white performance clips for British television. On 20 May, a second colour film was made at Chiswick House, which featured the Beatles miming to the song in and around the conservatory in the grounds of the house.
"Strawberry Fields Forever"	1967	Peter Goldmann	The promotional film for "Strawberry Fields Forever" was filmed on 30 and 31 January 1967 at Knole Park in Sevenoaks, Kent. Instead of a performance of the song, the clip relies on abstract imagery and features reverse film effects, stop motion animation, jump-cuts from day- to night-time, superimposition and close-up shots. The Beatles are shown playing and later pouring paint over the upright piano; at one point, McCartney appears to leap from the ground onto a branch of the tree. The clip presented the Beatles' with moustaches for the first time, which sharply contrasted with the youthful "moptop" image of their touring years.
"Penny Lane"	1967	Peter Goldmann	The promotional clip for "Penny Lane" was filmed in Liverpool, Stratford, and Knole Park in early February 1967. Like "Strawberry Fields Forever", it does not feature the band performing the song. Instead, it features the number 86 bus to Penny Lane, the shelter on the roundabout, and a fireman riding a white horse, the Beatles riding horses, and the band dressed in matching red tunics arriving at a table set up in the park, bearing a large candelabra. It closes with the members being presented with their musical instruments.
"Hello, Goodbye"	1967	Paul McCartney	The Beatles made three promotional clips for "Hello, Goodbye". Filmed on 10 November 1967 at the Saville Theatre in London, the first clip shows the Beatles dressed in their Sgt. Pepper uniforms, apart from a brief cut-away where the group are wearing their 1963-era matching collarless suits. In author John Winn's description of the three clips, this version shows the Beatles performing the song against a psychedelic backdrop, while over the coda they are joined on the stage by female hula dancers. Starr is seen playing a miniature drum kit and, unusually, Lennon appears without his granny glasses. In the second clip, the Beatles mime to the song dressed in more conventional attire and with the stage backdrop depicting a rural setting. The third version combines footage shot during these two scenes with the band playing the song before what Winn terms a "glittery pastel backdrop".
"Lady Madonna"	1968	Tony Bramwell	Two promotional films were made for "Lady Madonna". Filmed at EMI Studios on 11 February 1968, the footage consisted of the Beatles recording Lennon's "Hey Bulldog", which they supplied United Artists for use in the Yellow Submarine animated film. Little attempt was made to marry up the footage of the Beatles' playing and singing with the audio of "Lady Madonna"; in the second of the two clips, Harrison is shown eating a plate of beans, while both clips show Starr listening to a playback and the Beatles playing alternative instruments from those heard on the song. In 1999, the footage was re-edited by Apple to create a new clip for "Hey Bulldog", to help promote the reissue of the Yellow Submarine film.
"Hey Jude"	1968	Michael Lindsay-Hogg	The promotional clip for "Hey Jude" features the Beatles performing the song live in front of a controlled audience. It was shot at Twickenham Film Studios on 4 September 1968. In the clip, the Beatles are first seen by themselves, performing the initial chorus and verses, before the audience moves forward and joins them in singing the coda. The band sung live but otherwise performed to a backing track.
"Revolution"	1968	Michael Lindsay-Hogg	The promotional clip for "Revolution", like "Hey Jude", was shot at Twickenham Film Studios on 4 September 1968. Two finished clips of "Revolution" were produced, with only lighting differences and other minor variations. In them, the Beatles sang the vocals live over the pre-recorded instrumental track from the single version. Their vocals included elements from "Revolution 1": McCartney and Harrison sang the "shoo-bee-doo-wap" backing vocals, and Lennon sang "count me out – in".
"Something"	1969	Neil Aspinall	The promotional clip for "Something" was shot in late October 1969, not long after Lennon privately announced that he was leaving the band. By this time, the individual Beatles had grown apart, so the film consisted of separate clips of each Beatle walking around his home, accompanied by his wife, edited together. Harrison's segment shows him and Boyd together in the garden at Kinfauns; Winn comments on the attractiveness of all the wives in contrast to the unkempt appearance of McCartney, who had sunk into depression at the realisation that the Beatles were over. The four segments were edited and compiled into a single film clip by Neil Aspinall.

=== Post-1960s music videos ===
Title	Year	Director	Album	Notes
"Let It Be"	1970	Michael Lindsay-Hogg; Producer: Neil Aspinall	Let It Be (Note: The version of the song used in the music video differs from the album version.)	Filmed on 31 January 1969, at Apple Studio; Included in the film Let It Be
"Two of Us"	1970	Michael Lindsay-Hogg; Producer: Neil Aspinall	Let It Be	Filmed on 31 January 1969, at Apple Studio; Included in the film Let It Be
"The Long and Winding Road"	1970	Michael Lindsay-Hogg; Producer: Neil Aspinall	Let It Be	Filmed on 31 January 1969, at Apple Studio; Included in the film Let It Be
"Baby It's You" (2 versions)	1994	Geoff Wonfor; Editor: Andy Matthews; Camera Operator: Kevin Neill (of the Karl Denver Trio)	Live at the BBC	Most footage filmed in April 1963, at the BBC Paris Theatre, London
"Free as a Bird"	1995	Joe Pytka; Producer: Jane Brimblecombe	Anthology 1	
"Real Love" (2 versions)	1996	Kevin Godley, Geoff Wonfor; Producer: Chris Chipperfield, James Chads	Anthology 2	Recording studio footage filmed in February 1995
"All You Need Is Love"	1996	Derek Burrell-Davis	non-album track	Featured in the Anthology mini-series Filmed on 25 June 1967, in Studio 2, EMI Studios; Colourised using photographs taken in the studio on the day of recording for reference
"Hey Bulldog"	1999	The Beatles	Yellow Submarine Songtrack	Made for the release of Yellow Submarine Songtrack; Filmed on 11 February 1968, in Studio 3, EMI Studios
"Come Together"	2000	Alexandre Garnier, Christophe Branche; Producer: Melon Dezign	1	Made for the release of 1 and launch of the Beatles' official website
"Don't Let Me Down"	2003	Michael Lindsay-Hogg (Let It Be), Bob Smeaton (2003 edit); Producer: Neil Aspinall (Let It Be); Editor: Julian Caidan	Let It Be... Naked	Made for the release of Let It Be... Naked; Recorded on 30 January 1969, at the Beatles' rooftop concert Footage used in the film Let It Be
"Within You Without You / Tomorrow Never Knows"	2006	Simon Hilton; Producer: Astrid Edwards	Love	Made for the release of Love; Uses footage from the film Magical Mystery Tour, and the music videos for "Rain", "Strawberry Fields Forever", "Penny Lane", "Hello, Goodbye" and "All You Need Is Love"
"Words of Love"	2013	Lee Gingold, Giles Dill; Creative Director: Pete Candeland; Producers: Jonathan Clyde, Katrina Lofaro	On Air – Live at the BBC Volume 2	Made for the release of On Air – Live at the BBC Volume 2 Most footage recorded in 1963
"Eight Days a Week"	2015	Editor: Matthew Longfellow	Beatles for Sale	Made for 1+ Footage filmed on 15 August 1965, at Shea Stadium, New York City
"Yellow Submarine"	2015	George Dunning (Yellow Submarine); Producer: Al Brodax (Yellow Submarine); Creative Director: Heinz Edelmann (Yellow Submarine); Editor: Matthew Longfellow (1+ version)	Revolver	Made for 1+ Footage from the film Yellow Submarine (1968)
"While My Guitar Gently Weeps"	2016	Dandypunk, Andre Kasten and Leah Moyer	Love	Released to promote the show Love; Filmed in the Love Theatre at the Mirage, Las Vegas, and at other locations in Nevada, US
"Boys" (live)	2016	Paul Crowder	Live at the Hollywood Bowl	Released to promote Live at the Hollywood Bowl and The Beatles: Eight Days a Week
"Glass Onion"	2018	Alasdair Brotherston and Jock Mooney	The Beatles	Released to promote the 50th anniversary editions of the White Album
"Back in the U.S.S.R."	2018	Alasdair Brotherston and Jock Mooney	The Beatles	Released to promote the 50th anniversary editions of the White Album
"Here Comes the Sun"	2019	Alasdair Brotherston and Jock Mooney	Abbey Road	Released to promote the 50th anniversary editions of Abbey Road
"Taxman"	2022	Danny Sangra	Revolver	Released to promote the 2022 special edition of Revolver.
"I'm Only Sleeping"	2022	Em Cooper	Revolver	Released to promote the 2022 special edition of Revolver.
"Here, There and Everywhere"	2022	Rok Predin	Revolver	Released to promote the 2022 special edition of Revolver.
"Now and Then"	2023	Peter Jackson	1967–1970	Released to promote the 2023 edition of 1967–1970.

== Critical reception ==
Film	Rotten Tomatoes	Metacritic
A Hard Day's Night	98% (112 reviews)	96 (24 reviews)^{[A]}
Help!	86% (28 reviews)	—N/a
Magical Mystery Tour	64% (14 reviews)	—N/a
Yellow Submarine	96% (57 reviews)	79 (18 reviews)
Let It Be	81% (54 reviews)	—N/a
Average ratings	85%	87.5

- A : Ratings for the 2000 re-release.

== Documentaries ==
The Beatles have been the subject of a number of documentary films.

Title	Year	Director	Description
The Beatles in Australia	1964	Warwick Freeman	A documentary that follows the Beatles' 1964 tour of Australia
Around the Beatles	1964	Rita Gillespie	A television film featuring the Beatles performing at Wembley Park Studios in London on 28 April 1964.
What's Happening! The Beatles in the U.S.A.	1964	Albert and David Maysles	A documentary film about the Beatles' first visit to the US in February 1964.
The Beatles at Shea Stadium	1965	Bob Precht	A 50-minute long documentary about the Beatles' concert at Shea Stadium in New York City on 15 August 1965
The Beatles in Japan	1966	–	A television special featuring the Beatles performing in Japan during their 1966 tour.
A Salute to the Beatles: Once upon a Time	1975	David Frost (presenter)	A television special chronicling the career of the Beatles from their popularity in Liverpool in the early 1960s, through the era of Beatlemania and unprecedented commercial success and cultural influence, to the band's demise amid the business problems surrounding their Apple Corps enterprise.
The Compleat Beatles	1982	Patrick Montgomery	A documentary film chronicling the career of the Beatles, from pre-fame to the breakup. It was narrated by Malcolm McDowell.
It Was Twenty Years Ago Today	1987	John Sheppard	A television film about the 1967 Summer of Love and presents Sgt. Pepper's Lonely Hearts Club Band as the central factor behind the events and scenes that led to the full emergence of the 1960s counterculture.
The Beatles: The First U.S. Visit	1990	Albert and David Maysles	A re-edited version of What's Happening! The Beatles in the U.S.A.
The Beatles Anthology	1995	Geoff Wonfor and Bob Smeaton	An eight-part television miniseries about the career of the Beatles, featuring interviews, archive footage and performances.
All Together Now	2008	Adrian Wills	A documentary film that chronicles the making of the Beatles and Cirque du Soleil collaboration project Love.
How the Beatles Rocked the Kremlin	2009	Leslie Woodhead	A television film that tells the story of the Beatles' effect on the Soviet Union.
Good Ol' Freda	2013	Ryan White	A documentary film about Freda Kelly, secretary of Brian Epstein and the Beatles Fan Club, about her life near to the Fab Four for 11 years.
The Beatles: Eight Days a Week	2016	Ron Howard	A documentary film that follows the group's career during their touring years from 1962 to 1966, from their performances at the Cavern Club in Liverpool to their final concert in San Francisco in 1966.
How the Beatles Changed the World	2017	Tom O'Dell	A documentary about the history of the Beatles and their influence on everything from music, art, and culture to fashion and politics.
John & Yoko: Above Us Only Sky	2018	Michael Epstein	A documentary telling the untold story of John Lennon's 1971 album Imagine, exploring the creative collaboration between Lennon and Yoko Ono and featuring interviews and never-seen-before footage.
Meeting the Beatles in India	2020	Paul Saltzman	A documentary about the Beatles' stay in Maharishi Mahesh Yogi's Ashram in 1968 by Canadian filmmaker Paul Saltzman who was there at the time.
The Beatles and India	2021	Ajoy Bose with Peter Compton	This is the second documentary about the Beatles' stay in India in two years.
The Beatles: Get Back	2021	Peter Jackson	A documentary about the Beatles' Let It Be project. It draws from material originally captured in January 1969 by Michael Lindsay-Hogg for his 1970 documentary of the album. Originally set for a September 2020 premiere, the release date was pushed back by Walt Disney Pictures due to the COVID-19 pandemic. With a running time close to eight hours, the three-part series premiered on the Disney+ streaming service in November 2021.
TWST / Things We Said Today	2024	Andrei Ujică	A documentary film about the Beatles' concert at Shea Stadium in New York City on 15 August 1965.
Beatles '64	2024	David Tedeschi	A documentary film about the cultural impact on the aftermath of the Beatles' first visit to the US in February 1964.

== Fictionalised Beatles ==
The Beatles (and the individual members) have been portrayed onscreen numerous times, through film and television. Below is a list of films and television programmes that have portrayed the Beatles.

Title	Year	Director	Description
Birth of the Beatles	1979	Richard Marquand	A biographical film focusing on the early history of the Beatles. It stars Stephen MacKenna as Lennon, Rod Culbertson as McCartney, John Altman as Harrison and Ray Ashcroft as Starr.
Beatlemania: The Movie	1981	Joseph Manduke	A film adaptation of the Broadway show of the same name, starring Mitch Weissman (bass guitar; "Paul"), David Leon (rhythm guitar; "John"), Tom Teeley (lead guitar; "George"), and Ralph Castelli (drums; "Ringo").
Give My Regards to Broad Street	1984	Peter Webb	A film that covers a fictional day in the life of Paul McCartney, starring McCartney and Starr as fictionalized versions of themselves.
John and Yoko: A Love Story	1985	Sandor Stern	A made-for-television film that chronicles the lives of John Lennon and Yoko Ono, beginning before they met in 1966 and concluding with Lennon's murder in 1980. It stars Mark McGann as Lennon and Kim Miyori as Ono.
The Hours and Times	1991	Christopher Münch	The film tells a fictionalised account of what might have happened during a real holiday taken by Brian Epstein and Lennon in Barcelona in 1963, starring David Angus as Epstein and Ian Hart as Lennon.
Backbeat	1994	Iain Softley	The film focuses primarily on the relationship between Stuart Sutcliffe (Stephen Dorff) and Lennon (Ian Hart), and with Sutcliffe's German girlfriend Astrid Kirchherr (Sheryl Lee).
The Linda McCartney Story	2000	Armand Mastroianni	A television film covering the relationship between Paul and Linda McCartney, starring Elizabeth Mitchell as Linda and Gary Bakewell as Paul.
Two of Us	2000	Michael Lindsay-Hogg	A television film which offers a dramatised account of April 24, 1976, the day in which Lorne Michaels made a statement on Saturday Night Live offering the Beatles $3,000 to reunite on his program. It stars Jared Harris as Lennon and Aidan Quinn as McCartney.
In His Life: The John Lennon Story	2000	David Carson	A Lennon biopic that focuses on his teenage years, starring Philip McQuillen as Lennon
My Dinner with Jimi	2003	Howard Kaylan	An autobiographical film that tells the story of Kaylan and his band the Turtles' first tour of England, where they met many British rock stars, including the Beatles. It stars Brian Groh as Lennon, Quinton Flynn as McCartney, Nate Dushku as Harrison and Ben Bodé as Starr.
The Killing of John Lennon	2006	Andrew Piddington	A film about Mark David Chapman's plot to kill Lennon, starring Jonas Ball as Chapman and Richard Sherman as Lennon.
Chapter 27	2007	Jarrett Schaefer	A film depicting the murder of Lennon by Mark David Chapman, starring Jared Leto as Chapman.
Walk Hard: The Dewey Cox Story	2007	Jake Kasdan	A mock-biopic film that tells the story of a fictional early rock star named Dewey Cox. In the film, Cox and his bandmates go to India to pray with the Maharishi Mahesh Yogi, where they encounter the intentionally miscast Beatles with Paul Rudd, Jack Black, Justin Long and Jason Schwartzman as John, Paul, George and Ringo, respectively.
Nowhere Boy	2009	Sam Taylor-Wood	A John Lennon biopic, focusing on his adolescence, his relationships with his aunt Mimi Smith and his mother Julia Lennon, the creation of his first band, the Quarrymen, and its evolution into the Beatles. It stars Aaron Johnson as Lennon, along with Thomas Brodie-Sangster as McCartney and Sam Bell as Harrison.
Lennon Naked	2010	Edmund Coulthard	A television film based on the life of Lennon from 1967 to 1971 starring Christopher Eccleston as Lennon.
Playhouse Presents: "Snodgrass"	2013	David Blair	A television episode wondering what John Lennon's life would have been like if he had quit the Beatles in 1962. Ian Hart portrayed Lennon for the third time.
Cilla	2014	–	A British miniseries about the early career of Cilla Black that features the Beatles, Brian Epstein and George Martin in supporting roles.
Vinyl Episode: "E.A.B."	2016	Jon S. Baird	A short-lived HBO series about the 1970s music industry. It features an episode where Lennon and May Pang attend a Bob Marley & the Wailers show at Max's Kansas City. Lennon is portrayed by Stephen Sullivan and Pang is portrayed by Celia Au.
Midas Man	2024	Joe Stephenson	A Brian Epstein biopic starring Jacob Fortune-Lloyd. Lennon, McCartney, Harrison, Starr and George Martin are respectively played by Jonah Lees, Blake Richardson, Leo Harvey-Elledge, Campbell Wallace and Charley Palmer Rothwell.

=== Planned films ===
In February 2024, director Sam Mendes announced that Sony Pictures had approved plans for biopics of each individual member of the band known as The Beatles – A Four-Film Cinematic Event. The films are to be produced by Neal Street Productions with the backing of Sony Pictures, with a planned release for 2027. In November 2024, Ringo Starr announced that Irish actor Barry Keoghan would be playing him in the films. In December 2024, it was reported that Irish actor Paul Mescal would be starring in the four films as Paul McCartney, and that actor Joseph Quinn was in talks to star as George Harrison. In March 2025, Sony announced Harris Dickinson would play John Lennon alongside Keoghan, Mescal, and Quinn, and that all four films would be released in April 2028. In October 2025, James Norton was cast as Brian Epstein, while Saoirse Ronan, Anna Sawai, Aimee Lou Wood, and Mia McKenna-Bruce were cast as the Beatles' spouses Linda McCartney, Yoko Ono, Pattie Boyd, and Maureen Starkey Tigrett respectively.

== Inspired by the Beatles ==
Several fictional films not depicting the Beatles have been entirely based on Beatles themes and songs:

Title	Year	Director	Description
Pinoy Beatles	1964	Artemio Marquez	A Tagalog musical made in the Philippines. It was released three months after A Hard Day's Night.
The Girls on the Beach	1965	William Witney	A beach party film in which college sorority members mistakenly believe the Beatles are going to perform at their sorority fundraiser.
All This and World War II	1976	Susan Winslow	A documentary film of World War II using Beatles music.
Sgt. Pepper's Lonely Hearts Club Band	1978	Michael Schultz	A musical based on the Beatles' album of the same name starring Peter Frampton and the Bee Gees.
I Wanna Hold Your Hand	1978	Robert Zemeckis	A coming of age film about Beatlemania and is a fictionalised account of 9 February 1964, the Beatles' first appearance on The Ed Sullivan Show.
All You Need Is Cash	1978	Eric Idle and Gary Weis	A television mockumentary featuring the Rutles, a parody of the Beatles.
Yesterday	1985	Radosław Piwowarski	A band of four teenagers play a concert full of Beatles hits for their high school graduation.
Secrets	1992	Michael Pattinson	A drama film about five Australian teenagers who get locked in the basement of a hotel where the Beatles are staying.
I Am Sam	2001	Jessie Nelson	A drama film about the story of an intellectually disabled father who loves the Beatles and his efforts to retain custody of his daughter
The Rutles 2: Can't Buy Me Lunch	2005	Eric Idle	A re-telling of All You Need Is Cash featuring the Rutles in a modern-day setting
Across the Universe	2007	Julie Taymor	A jukebox musical that centers on Beatles songs. The music and the Vietnam War form the backdrop for a romance between an upper-class young woman from the U.S. and a poor Liverpudlian artist.
Living Is Easy with Eyes Closed	2014	David Trueba	A Spanish film set in 1966 while Lennon is shooting How I Won The War in Almeria
Beatles	2014	Peter Flinth	A Norwegian film based on the Lars Saabye Christensen novel Beatles. The plot centers around four friends growing up in Oslo in the sixties, who occasionally think of themselves as the Fab Four.
Yesterday	2019	Danny Boyle	A musical starring Himesh Patel as a struggling musician who, after an accident, finds himself the only person who remembers the Beatles and becomes famous after taking credit for their songs. It also stars Lily James as the musician's childhood friend and Ed Sheeran as a fictionalised version of himself. Robert Carlyle also plays a version of John Lennon who, due to never becoming famous, lived well into his senior years.

== Other ==
- The vultures in the 1967 animated film The Jungle Book are considered caricatures of the Beatles. The Beatles were originally planned to voice them, but later declined due to scheduling conflicts.

== See also ==
- Outline of the Beatles
- The Beatles timeline
