= It Was Twenty Years Ago Today =

It Was Twenty Years Ago Today may refer to:

- "It was twenty years ago today", the first line of the 1967 Beatles song "Sgt. Pepper's Lonely Hearts Club Band"
- It Was Twenty Years Ago Today (film), a 1987 British television documentary film
- "It Was Twenty Years Ago Today" (Roseanne), a 1993 television episode
