= Stephanie Bennett =

Stephanie Bennett may refer to:

- Stephanie Bennett (actress), Canadian actress
- Stephanie Bennett (producer), English film producer
- Stephanie Bennett (harpist), American harpist
