= Margaret Bennett =

Margaret Bennett is the name of:

- Margaret Bennett (figure skater) (1910–1984), American figure skater
- Margaret Bennett (writer) (born 1946), Scottish writer
- Margaret Stephanie Bennett, English film producer
- Peggy Bennett (born 1958), American political candidate

== Fiction ==
- Margaret Bennett, a character in the television series E Street
- Maggie Bennett, fictional character in a novel series by Anne Stuart
