= Endless Harmony =

Endless Harmony may refer to:

- "Endless Harmony", a song written by Bruce Johnston and included on the 1980 Beach Boys album Keepin' the Summer Alive
- Endless Harmony: The Beach Boys Story, a 1998 documentary about The Beach Boys
- Endless Harmony Soundtrack, a compilation album of previously unissued recordings released in connection with the documentary
