= John and Yoko (disambiguation) =

John and Yoko, or John & Yoko, generally refers to the relationship between John Lennon and Yoko Ono.

It may also refer to:

- "John & Yoko", the first side of Lennon and Ono's Wedding Album
- John and Yoko: A Love Story, 1985 American television biopic
- John & Yoko: Above Us Only Sky, 2018 documentary film
- One to One: John & Yoko, 2024 documentary film
- The Ballad of John and Yoko, a 1969 single by the Beatles

== See also ==
- War Is Over! Inspired by the Music of John and Yoko
