= Race Through the Skies =

2020 book by Martin W. Sandler

- First edition cover
- Author: Martin W. Sandler
- Publisher: Bloomsbury Publishing
- Publication date: July 28, 2020
- ISBN: 978-1-5476-0344-2

Race Through the Skies: The Week the World Learned to Fly is a 2020 non-fiction children's book by the American writer and historian Martin W. Sandler. The book focuses on a single week in August 1908 that "introduced aviation to the world", the week of an early air show and competition in Reims. Like Sandler's other books, Race Through the Skies includes contemporary photographs, newspaper clippings, and posters alongside the text, as well as detailed information about key characters in the book, including the Wright brothers, Glenn Curtiss, Jorge Chávez, and Louis Blériot.

Race Through the Skies was generally well received by critics with some criticisms. Kirkus Reviews described it "fascinating, eminently entertaining, and sometimes frustrating"; they highlighted how "the races are presented in thrilling detail and clearly placed in the context of the history of early aviation". Publishers Weekly indicated that "the firsthand accounts ... will enthrall young aviation enthusiasts". School Library Journal's Bob Hassett similarly wrote, "This captivating nonfiction read will appeal to anyone interested in the history of flight, inventions, or thrill sports". However, Publishers found that the book's use of "sophisticated text and French terminology, some of which is untranslated, may make this a challenging read". Kirkus Reviews similarly discussed how, "in the midst of excellence, numerous additional topics, all about two pages long, are wedged in, nearly always interrupting the narrative midsentence," which they describe as "an annoying design flaw in this otherwise fine work".

Race Through the Skies is a Junior Library Guild book and was nominated for the 2021 YALSA Award for Excellence in Nonfiction.
