= A Salute to the Beatles: Once upon a Time =

1975 television special

- Title screen
- Starring: David Frost (narrator); John Lennon; Paul McCartney; George Harrison; Ringo Starr; George Martin; Derek Taylor; Mal Evans; Peter Brown
- Country of origin: United Kingdom; United States

Production
- Producer: David Frost
- Running time: 60 minutes (approx.)

Original release
- Network: ABC (US)
- Release: 21 May 1975

A Salute to the Beatles: Once upon a Time (also known as David Frost Salutes the Beatles) is a 1975 television special about the English rock band the Beatles. It was presented and produced by English TV presenter David Frost for the American Broadcasting Company (ABC) network, and aired as one of Frost's Wide World of Entertainment specials, on 21 May 1975. The program documents the career of the Beatles from their popularity in Liverpool in the early 1960s, through the era of Beatlemania and unprecedented commercial success and cultural influence, to the band's demise amid the business problems surrounding their Apple Corps enterprise. The film includes archival footage and latter-day interviews with Beatles associates such as George Martin, Derek Taylor and Mal Evans. Commentary on the band's influence on popular music is provided by David Essex, Chuck Berry and Bobby Vinton.

A Salute to the Beatles was one of the first television projects to explore the Beatles phenomenon in detail. For American audiences, according to authors Chip Madinger and Mark Easter, the ABC special was "revelatory". Among the scenes that had rarely been broadcast in the US, it includes footage of the Beatles performing "Some Other Guy" at the Cavern in Liverpool in August 1962 and the band's January 1965 appearance on the US show Shindig! The program also includes clips of the former members in the "present". Among these are a portion of John Lennon's 1973 interview on Malibu Beach with Elliot Mintz, footage of Paul McCartney and his band Wings rehearsing their song "Give Ireland Back to the Irish" in London, and a scene showing Ringo Starr acting in the film That'll Be the Day.

Author Robert Rodriguez recognises A Salute to the Beatles as a possible "blueprint" for the Rutles' 1978 pastiche of the Beatles' story, All You Need Is Cash, in which Eric Idle narrates in the clipped style of Frost. While acknowledging its lack of precedence at the time, Rodriguez describes the ABC special as "staggeringly incomplete and almost naïve in its approach to its subjects". The program was not officially released on video but has long circulated in bootlegged form.
