= Martin W. Sandler =

American author and historian (born 1933)

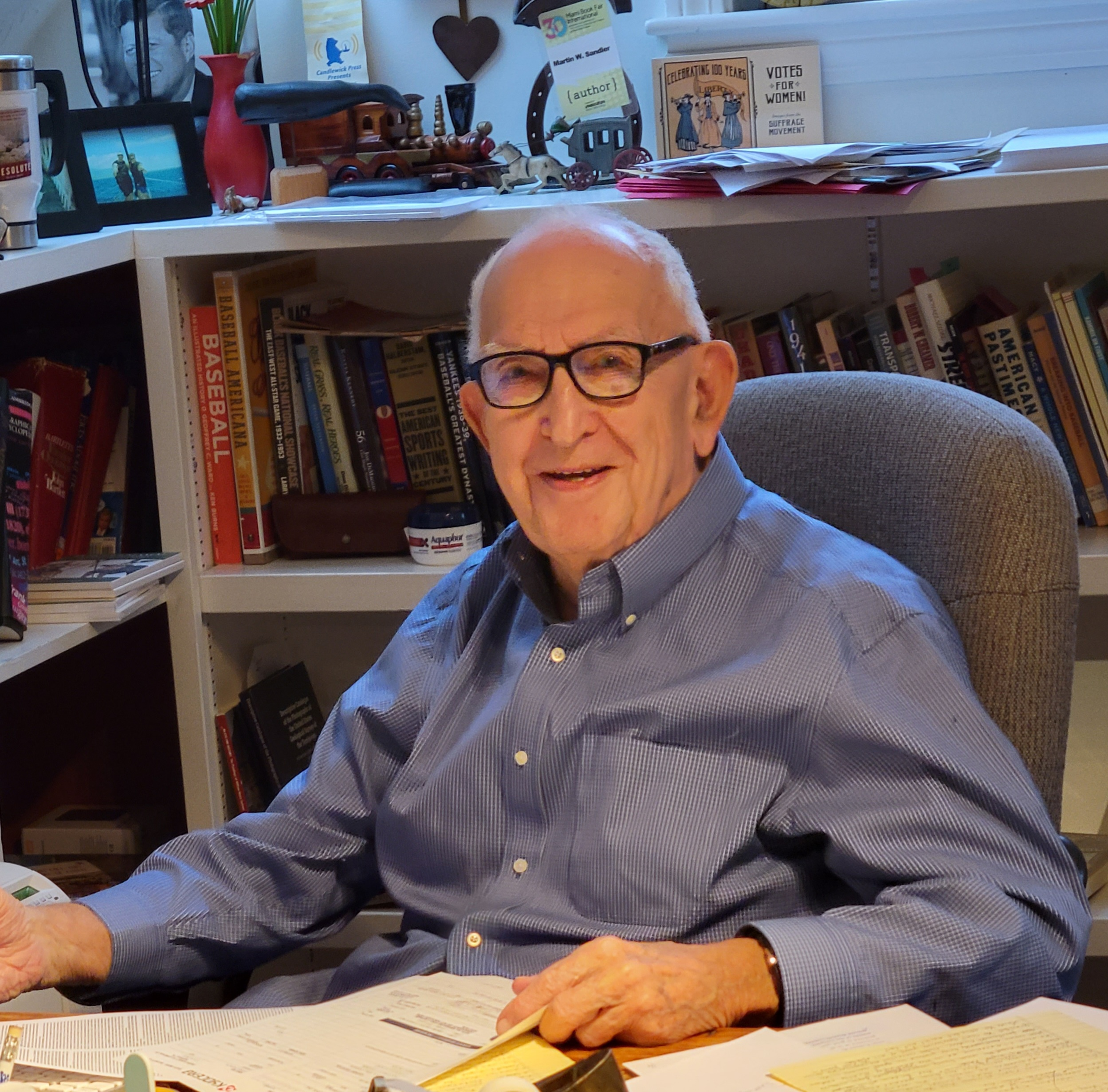
- Sandler at his desk, December 2021.
- Born: Martin William Sandler; February 11, 1933 (age 92); New Bedford, Massachusetts, United States
- Occupation: Author; Historian; Television producer and writer
- Education: Providence College (BA); Brown University (MA)
- Genre: American History
- Notable works: Secret Subway (2009); The Impossible Rescue (2012); Imprisoned (2013); How the Beatles Changed the World (2014); Iron Rails, Iron Men, and the Race to Link the Nation (2015); The Whydah (2017); Apollo 8 (2018); 1919 (2019); Race Through the Skies (2020)
- Notable awards: Cybils Award (2013, 2019); National Book Award for Young People's Literature (2019)

Signature
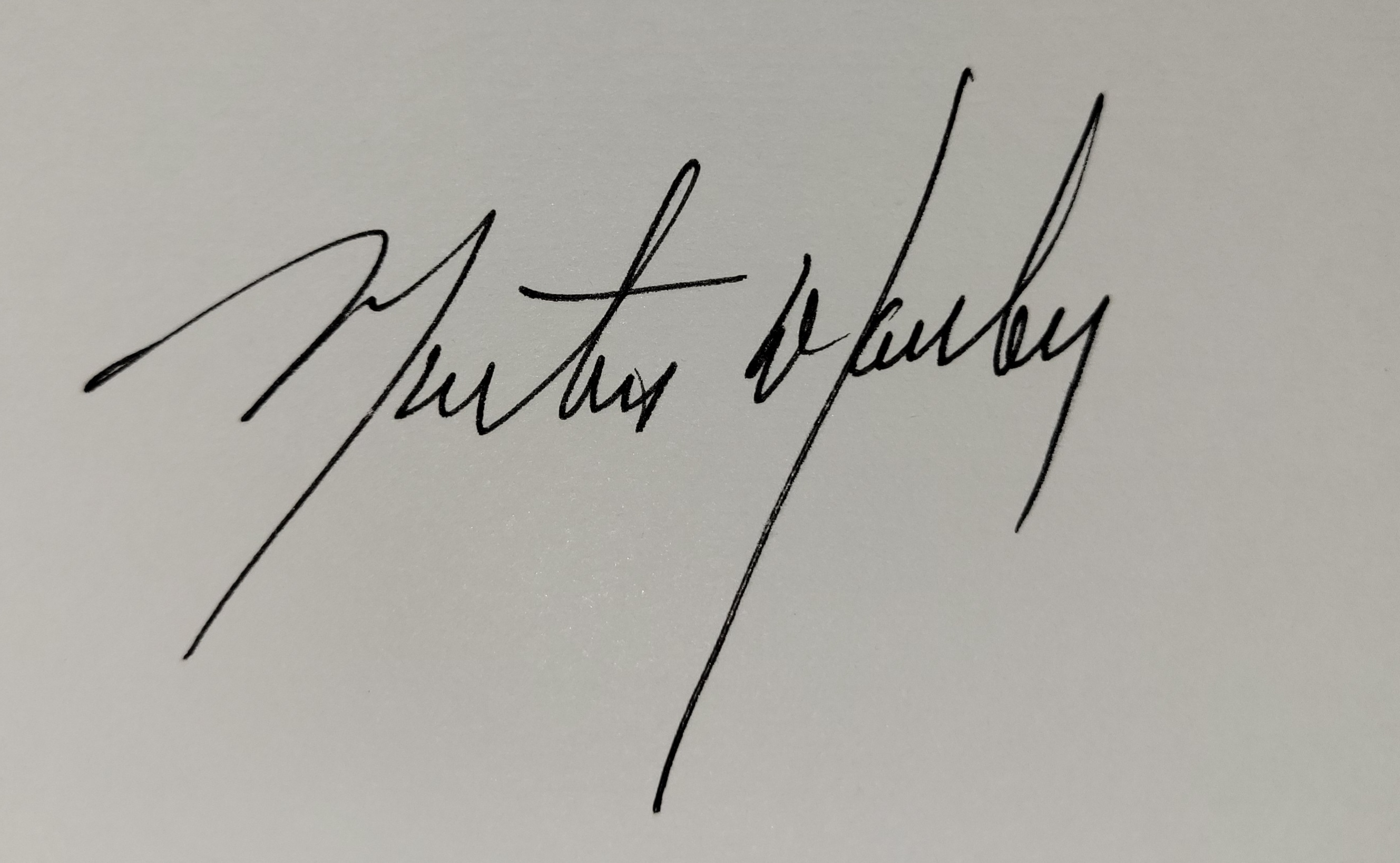

Martin W. Sandler (born February 11, 1933) is an American historian, writer and teacher, the author of more than 50 books about American history and photography. Notable works include Secret Subway (2009), The Impossible Rescue (2012), Imprisoned (2013), How the Beatles Changed the World (2014), Iron Rails, Iron Men, and the Race to Link the Nation (2015), The Whydah (2017), Apollo 8 (2018), 1919 (2019), and Race Through the Skies (2020). Among other honors, he won the 2019 National Book Award for Young People's Literature.

== Early life and education ==
Sandler was born February 11, 1933, in New Bedford, Massachusetts.

He attended Providence College on a baseball scholarship, receiving a Bachelor of Arts in history; he later earned a Master of Arts in history from Brown University.

== Career ==
Sandler worked as a history and English teacher and baseball coach at Quincy Central Junior High School in Quincy, MA and head of school at Stowe Preparatory Academy in Stowe, Vt. He subsequently taught American Studies at the University of Massachusetts-Amherst and Smith College. While a teacher, Sandler endeavored to revitalize the teaching of secondary-school history with a 1971 textbook, The People Make a Nation, that called on students to draw conclusions about history from examining and interpreting primary sources, instead of memorizing facts and narratives.

== Awards and honors ==
Eleven of Sander's books are Junior Library Guild selections: Vaqueros (2001), America Through the Lens (2005), Secret Subway (2009), The Impossible Rescue (2012), How the Beatles Changed the World (2014), Iron Rails, Iron Men, and the Race to Link the Nation (2016), The Whydah (2017), Apollo 8 (2018), Race Through the Skies (2020), Picturing a Nation (2022), and Shipwrecked! (2023).

Sandler's books have regularly been included on year-end lists:

- In 1979, The Story of American Photography was named one of the year's best nonfiction children's books The Horn Book Magazine.
- In 2012, The Impossible Rescue was named one of the year's best children's books by Kirkus Reviews and School Library Journal. The following year, Bank Street College of Education included it on their list of the best history books for children ages 12-14.
- In 2012, Through the Lens was named a history book of "outstanding merit" for children ages 9-12 by Bank Street College of Education.
- In 2016, Iron Rails, Iron Men, and the Race to Link the Nation was named one of the year's best history books for children ages 14 and up by Bank Street College of Education.
- In 2017, The Whydah was named one of the year's best nonfiction children's books by New York Public Library (NYPL) and School Library Journal. The following year, the Association for Library Service to Children named it among the year's Notable Children's Books, and Bank Street College of Education named it a history book of "outstanding merit" for children ages 12-14.
- In 2019, 1919 was named one of the year's best children's books by The Washington Post. The following year, Bank Street College of Education named it one of the year's best history books for children ages 14 and older.
- In 2019, Apollo 8 was named a history book of "outstanding merit" for children ages 12-14 by Bank Street College of Education.
- In 2021, Picturing a Nation was included on Booklist's list of the year's "Top 10 Arts Books for Youth". The following year, Bank Street College of Education named a history book of "outstanding merit" for children ages 12-14 by .
- In 2023, Shipwrecked! was named one of the year's best children's books by the NYPL. The following year, Bank Street College of Education named Shipwrecked! one of the year's best history books for children ages 12-24.

Awards for Sandler's writing
Title	Year	Award	Result	Ref.
1919	2019	Cybils Award for Junior High Nonfiction	Finalist	
1919	2019	National Book Award for Young People's Literature	Winner	
1919	2020	Orbis Pictus Award	Honor	
1919	2020	YALSA Award for Excellence in Nonfiction	Nominee	
Apollo 8	2018	Cybils Award for Junior High Nonfiction	Finalist	
Imprisoned	2013	Cybils Award for Young Adult Nonfiction	Winner	
Imprisoned	2014	YALSA Award for Excellence in Nonfiction	Finalist	
The Impossible Rescue	2013	YALSA Award for Excellence in Nonfiction	Nominee	
Lincoln Through the Lens	2008	Cybils Award for Middle Grade and Young Adult Nonfiction	Finalist	
Race Through the Skies	2021	YALSA Award for Excellence in Nonfiction	Nominee	
Secret Subway	2010	YALSA Award for Excellence in Nonfiction	Finalist	
Shipwrecked	2024	Sibert Medal	Honor	
The Whydah	2018	YALSA Award for Excellence in Nonfiction	Finalist	
The Whydah	2019	Dorothy Canfield Fisher Children's Book Award	Nominee	
The Whydah	2019	Cybils Award for Junior High Nonfiction	Winner	

== Selected publications ==
=== Sole author ===
- This was Connecticut: Images of a Vanished World. Little, Brown, & Co. 1977. ISBN 978-0-316-77019-4.
- This Was New England: Images of a Vanished Past. New York Graphic Society. 1977. ISBN 978-0-8212-0715-4.
- Story of American Photography: An Illustrated History for Young People. Little, Brown, & Co. 1979. ISBN 978-0-316-77021-7.
- This Was America. Little, Brown & Co. 1980. ISBN 0-2050-2700-8.
- The Way We Lived: A Photographic Record of Work in Vanished America. Little, Brown, & Co. 1984. ISBN 978-0-316-77020-0.
- American Image: Photographing One Hundred Fifty Years in the Life of a Nation. Contemporary books. 1989. ISBN 978-0-8092-4381-5.
- Cowboys. HarperCollinsPublishers. 1994. ISBN 978-0-06-023318-1.
- Pioneers. HarperCollins. 1994. ISBN 978-0-06-023023-4.
- Immigrants. HarperCollins. 1995. ISBN 978-0-06-024507-8.
- Presidents. HarperCollins. 1995. ISBN 978-0-06-024534-4.
- Civil War. HarperCollins Publishers. 1996. ISBN 978-0-06-026024-8.
- Inventors. HarperCollins Publishers. 1996. ISBN 978-0-06-024923-6.
- America! A Celebration. DK. 2000. ISBN 0-7894-6806-9.
- Vaqueros: America's First Cowmen. Henry Holt and Co. 2001. ISBN 978-0-8050-6019-5.
- Against the Odds: Women Pioneers in the First Hundred Years of Photography. Rizzoli Internat. Publ. 2002. ISBN 978-0-8478-2304-8.
- Photography: An Illustrated History. Oxford University Press. 2002. ISBN 978-0-19-512608-2.
- America's Great Disasters. HarperCollins. 2003. ISBN 978-0-06-029107-5.
- Driving Around the USA: Automobiles in American Life. Oxford University Press. 2003. ISBN 978-0-19-513230-4.
- Galloping across the USA: Horses in American Life. Transportation in America. New York: Oxford University Press. 2003. ISBN 978-0-19-513226-7.
- Riding the Rails in the USA: Trains in American Life. Oxford University Press. 2003. ISBN 978-0-19-513228-1.
- Straphanging in the USA: Trolleys and Subways in American Life. Oxford University Press. 2003. ISBN 978-0-19-513229-8.
- Flying over the USA: Airplanes in American Life. Oxford University Press. 2004. ISBN 978-0-19-513231-1.
- Island of Hope: The Story of Ellis Island and the Journey to America. Scholastic. 2004. ISBN 978-0-439-53082-8.
- On the Waters of the USA: Ships and Boats in American Life. Oxford University Press. 2003. ISBN 978-0-195-13227-4.
- America Through the Lens: Photographers Who Changed the Nation. Henry Holt and Co. 2005. ISBN 978-0-8050-7367-6. OCLC 56617358.
- Resolute: The Epic Search for the Northwest Passage and John Franklin, and the Discovery of the Queen's Ghost Ship. Sterling Publishing Company. 2006. ISBN 978-1-4027-4085-5. OCLC 72695861.
- Trapped In Ice!: An Amazing True Whaling Adventure. Scholastic Nonfiction. 2006. ISBN 978-0-439-74363-1. OCLC 59756031.
- Atlantic Ocean: The Illustrated History of the Ocean That Changed the World. Sterling. 2008. ISBN 978-1-4027-4724-3. OCLC 213301460.
- Lincoln Through the Lens: How Photography Revealed and Shaped An Extraordinary Life. Walker Publishing Company. 2008. ISBN 978-0-8027-9666-0. OCLC 190620127.
- The Dust Bowl Through the Lens: How Photograph Revealed and Helped Remedy a Natural Disaster. Walker & Company. 2008. ISBN 978-0-8027-9547-2.
- Secret Subway: The Fascinating Tale of an Amazing Feat of Engineering. National Geographic. 2009. ISBN 978-1-4263-0463-7. OCLC 244416711.
- Lost to Time: Unforgettable Stories that History Forgot. Sterling Publishing. 2010. ISBN 978-1-4027-2958-4. OCLC 436618708.
- The Impossible Rescue: The True Story of an Amazing Arctic Adventure. Candlewick Press. 2012. ISBN 978-0-7636-5080-3.
- Kennedy through the Lens: How Photography and Television Revealed and Shaped an Extraordinary Leader. Walker & Co. 2011. ISBN 978-0-8027-2160-0.
- Imprisoned: The Betrayal of Japanese Americans During World War II. New York: Walker Books For Young Readers. 2013. ISBN 978-0-8027-2277-5.
- The Letters of John F. Kennedy. Bloomsbury Press. 2013. ISBN 978-1-60819-271-7.
- Why Did the Whole World Go to War? And Other Questions about World War II. Illustrated by Robert Barrett. Sterling Children's Books. 2013. ISBN 978-1-4027-9621-0.
- How the Beatles Changed the World. Walker Books for Young Readers. 2014. ISBN 978-0-8027-3565-2.
- Who Were the American Pioneers? And Other Questions about Westward Expansion. Illustrated by Robert Barrett. Sterling Children's Books. 2014. ISBN 978-1-4027-9624-1.
- Iron Rails, Iron Men, and the Race to Link the Nation: The Story of the Transcontinental Railroad. Candlewick Press. 2015. ISBN 978-0-7636-6527-2. OCLC 900179943.
- The Whydah: A Pirate Ship Feared, Wrecked, and Found. Candlewick Press. 2017. ISBN 978-0-7636-8033-6. OCLC 953597834.
- Apollo 8: The Mission That Changed Everything. Candlewick Press. 2018. ISBN 978-0-7636-9489-0. OCLC 1020309754.
- 1919: The Year That Changed America. Bloomsbury Children's Books. 2019. ISBN 978-1-68119-801-9.
- Race Through the Skies: The Week the World Learned to Fly. Bloomsbury Children's Books. 2020. ISBN 978-1-5476-0346-6.
- Picturing a Nation: The Great Depression's Finest Photographers Introduce America to Itself. Somerville: Candlewick Press. 2021. ISBN 978-1-5362-1525-0.
- Shipwrecked: Diving for Hidden Time Capsules on the Ocean Floor. Astra Young Readers. 2023. ISBN 978-1-6626-0204-7.

=== With Others ===
- with Edwin C. Rozwenc and Edward C. Martin, The People Make a A Nation, Boston: Allyn and Bacon (1971) ISBN 0-3167-7022-1
