= Iron Rails, Iron Men, and the Race to Link the Nation =

2015 book by Martin W. Sandler

- First edition cover
- Author: Martin W. Sandler
- Publisher: Candlewick Press
- Publication date: September 8, 2015
- ISBN: 978-0-763-66527-2

Iron Rails, Iron Men, and the Race to Link the Nation: The Story of the Transcontinental Railroad is a 2015 non-fiction children's book by American writer and historian Martin W. Sandler. The book details the creation of the transcontinental railroad through competing companies, including "the greed, corruption, and violence that followed the tracks". Like Sandler's other books, Iron Rails, Iron Men, and the Race to Link the Nation includes various contemporary photographs.

Iron Rails, Iron Men, and the Race to Link the Nation was well received by critics. According to School Library Journal's Hilary Writt, "Sandler tells a good story, filled with complex characters, adventure, and heartache, and he meticulously documents his research efforts". Similarly, Angela Leeper, writing for Booklist, highlighted the book's "stunning detail", and Kirkus Reviews referred to the book as a "dramatic story related in dramatic fashion". Writt noted, however, that "even though Sandler expounds throughout on the sacrifices made by Chinese workers and the irreparable impact on Native Americans and their culture, the book is written from the perspective of those in power."

Iron Rails, Iron Men, and the Race to Link the Nation is a Junior Library Guild book. In 2016, Bank Street College of Education named it one of the year's best history books for children ages 14 and up.
