= Apollo 8 (book) =

2018 nonfiction children's book by Martin W. Sandler

- First edition book cover
- Author: Martin W. Sandler
- Publisher: Candlewick Press
- Publication date: October 9, 2018
- ISBN: 978-0-7636-9489-0

Apollo 8: The Mission That Changed Everything is a 2018 nonfiction children's book by American author Martin W. Sandler. The book, which includes numerous historical photographs, details the historical significance of the Apollo 8 mission, discussing the "broader context of the Cold War space race and the tumultuous events occurring in the United States", including the assassinations of Martin Luther King Jr. and Robert F. Kennedy, as well as growing contestations regarding the Vietnam War. Further, Apollo 8 "explores the colossal impact of the mission on the American psyche".

Apollo 8 was well received by critics. According to Kirkus Reviews, Apollo 8 provides "a compelling account of the historical significance of a lesser-known space mission". They highlighted "Sandler's discussion of the iconic Earthrise photograph and how it 'became a symbol of the Earth's fragility, a reminder of just how small and insignificant the Earth's place in the universe truly is.'" Elizabeth Bush, writing for The Bulletin of the Center for Children's Books, described Apollo 8 as a "nail-biting true adventure" as "Sandler deals equally well with technical and personal narrative threads, explaining the challenges of navigation and reentry and attending to the very different personalities crammed into the tiny command capsule." She further highlighted how Sanders "pays serious attention to the cultural impact of the mission, whose photographs of Earthrise inspired a fresh way of looking at the home planet and of appreciating its fragility, thus advancing not only the space program but also the ecology movement".

Apollo 8 is a Junior Library Guild book. In 2018, it was a finalist for the Cybils Award for Junior High Nonfiction. The following year, Bank Street College of Education named it a history book of "outstanding merit" for children ages 12–14.
