= Imprisoned: The Betrayal of Japanese Americans During World War II =

2013 book by Martin W. Sandler

- First edition book cover
- Author: Martin W. Sandler
- Publisher: Walker Books for Young Readers
- Publication date: August 27, 2013
- Award: Cybils Award (2013)
- ISBN: 978-0-8027-2277-5

Imprisoned: The Betrayal of Japanese Americans During World War II is a 2013 non-fiction children's book by American writer and historian Martin W. Sandler. The book describes the lives of Japanese Americans before, during, and after their time in internment camps during World War II, as well as Japanese Americans who served in the United States military during the war.

Imprisoned was well received by critics, including starred reviews from Booklist and School Library Journal. Booklist's Carolyn Phelan found the text to be "well-organized" and "clearly written". On behalf of The Bulletin of the Center for Children's Books, Elizabeth Bush similarly described the text as "cogently organized". Phelan also highlighted the "well-chosen photographs and other documents", which help the book provide "a clear view of an episode in American history that still receives too little focus". Jody Kopple, writing for School Library Journal, highlighted how "Sandler expertly crafts a narrative that manages to explain the horror and incomprehensibility of locking up American citizens in prison camps simply because of their ethnic ancestry".

Imprisoned won the 2013 Cybils Award for Young Adult Nonfiction and was a finalist for the 2014 YALSA Award for Excellence in Nonfiction.
