= Secret Subway =

2009 non-fiction children's book by Martin W. Sandler

- First edition book cover
- Author: Martin W. Sandler
- Publisher: National Geographic
- Publication date: May 1, 2009
- ISBN: 978-1-4263-0462-0

Secret Subway: The Fascinating Tale of an Amazing Feat of Engineering is a 2009 non-fiction children's book by American writer and historian Martin W. Sandler. The book discusses the construction of the first subway in New York City under the guidance of American inventor, publisher, and patent lawyer Alfred Ely Beach (1826–1896). Construction on the tunnel began secretly, occurring throughout the night, and was completed just before the economic collapse of 1873. The book contains photographs from the time period, as well as maps to support to the text.

According to Kirkus Reviews, Sandler provides "a positively scary picture of what the city's streets were like at midcentury" through a "multistranded tale in which Beach, Boss Tweed and New York itself play roughly equal roles; readers will come away admiring the uncommon ambition of all three". Hazel Rochman, writing for Booklist, argued that "readers, especially the tech-minded, will be held as much by the gripping, personal story as by the engineering details of Beach's plan, and also how the subway works today". Rochman also highlighted how the book "evokes a strong sense of the power politics and the amazing efforts underground".

Secret Subway is a Junior Library Guild book, and was a finalist for the 2010 YALSA Award for Excellence in Nonfiction.
