= 1919: The Year That Changed America =

2019 book by Martin W. Sandler

- First edition cover
- Author: Martin W. Sandler
- Publisher: Bloomsbury Children's Books
- Publication date: January 8, 2019
- Award: National Book Award for Young People's Literature (2019)
- ISBN: 978-1-68119-801-9

1919: The Year That Changed America is a 2019 non-fiction children's book by American author Martin W. Sandler. The book details various events from 1919, including the Great Molasses Flood in Boston, "which led to building code, municipal oversight, and corporate liability precedents", the Nineteenth Amendment's passing, racial tensions, the Red Scare, changing labor conditions, and the beginning of prohibition. Beyond discussing the events themselves, Sandler explain the long-standing impact of each in the United States.

1919 was well received by critics. Kirkus Reviews referred to it as "an entertaining and instructive look at a tumultuous year," while Publishers Weekly highlighted "Sandler's narrative skill and eye for detail, and the abundant archival photos throughout," which they found "make for an engrossing resource". Stephanie Wilkes, writing for School Library Journal, described the book as "well researched and presented in an attractive manner" as it "delivers a solid look at a pivotal year". Most reviewers found the "100 Years Later" chapter, which connects the events of 1919 to the present, intriguing; however, Booklist's Carolyn Phelan noted that "a few sections stretch the concept rather far, presenting current issues such as climate change". Otherwise, Phelan found the book to be "an intriguing look back at America in 1919".

The Washington Post named 1919 one of the best children's books of 2019. The following year, Bank Street College of Education named it one of the year's best history books for children ages 14 and older.

Awards for 1919
Year	Award	Result	Ref.
2019	Cybils Award for Junior High Nonfiction	Finalist	
2019	National Book Award for Young People's Literature	Winner	
2020	Orbis Pictus Award	Honor	
2020	YALSA Award for Excellence in Nonfiction	Nominee	
