= The Whydah =

2017 nonfiction children's book by Martin W. Sandler

- First edition book cover
- Author: Martin W. Sandler
- Genre: Children's historical fiction
- Publisher: Candlewick Press
- Publication date: March 13, 2017
- Award: Cybils Award (2019)
- ISBN: 978-0-763-68033-6

The Whydah: A Pirate Ship Feared, Wrecked, and Found is a 2017 nonfiction children's book by Martin W. Sandler about the Whydah, "a large, fast, and heavily armed slave ship", which was captured by pirates in 1716 and sunk shortly after. The ship was rediscovered on the ocean's floor in the 1980s, along with its tremendous riches. Throughout the book, Sandler discusses the pirates, led by Samuel Bellamy, "the causes and practices of piracy", including their "barbarous cruelty", as well as the more democratic nature of their culture.

== Reception ==
=== Reviews ===
In a starred review, School Library Journal's Anne Jung-Mathews described The Whydah as "a captivating read on pirates, with insights into contemporary underwater research techniques". Jung-Mathews discussed how "Sandler's approach to the Whydah and other submerged ships as "sunken time capsules" is an interesting angle that is sure to resonate with aspiring archaeologists. " She also noted that "occasional sidebars on specific topics, such as the mythic origins of the Jolly Roger flag and artifact restoration, break up the narrative flow but do contain valuable information". In a review for Booklist, Carolyn Phelan similarly discussed how "the text branches into side issues at times", though found that "Sandler's broad research and his evident fascination with the subject result in a multifaceted story that many readers will find rewarding". Phelan also highlighted the book's "black-and-white illustrations", which "include archival prints, maps, and documents as well as photos of the excavation process and the objects recovered".

=== Awards and honors ===
The Whydah is a Junior Library Guild book. School Library Journal and the New York Public Library named it one of the best nonfiction children's books of 2017. The following year, the Association for Library Service to Children included it on their list of Notable Children's Books.

Awards for The Whydah
Year	Award	Result	Ref.
2018	YALSA Award for Excellence in Nonfiction	Finalist	
2019	Cybils Award for Junior High Nonfiction	Winner	
2019	Dorothy Canfield Fisher Children's Book Award	Nominee	
