= The Impossible Rescue =

2012 nonfiction children's book by Martin W. Sandler

- First edition cover
- Author: Martin W. Sandler
- Genre: Children's historical non-fiction
- Publisher: Candlewick Press
- Publication date: August 31, 2012
- ISBN: 978-0-763-65080-3

The Impossible Rescue: The True Story of an Amazing Arctic Adventure is a 2012 nonfiction children's book by American author Martin W. Sandler. The book explores the rescue of eight whaling ships trapped in the ice of the Arctic Ocean in the winter of 1897.

The Impossible Rescue was well received by critics, including starred reviews from Booklist, Kirkus Reviews, and Publishers Weekly.

Kirkus described the "outstanding nonfiction writing that makes history come alive". School Library Journal's Caroline Hanson expanded on this sentiment, writing, "Sandler has pieced together a stirring and evocative retelling of this historical adventure. The writing draws readers into both the suspense of reaching the struggling whalers in time as well as the dire, life-threatening conditions that the rescuers themselves faced." According to Publishers Weekly, Sandler provides details about the rescue in "scrupulous and riveting detail", creating a "riveting account". Elizabeth Bush, writing for The Bulletin of the Center for Children's Books, further discussed how "the ordeal of the rescuers, whose mission was roundly considered as a suicidal folly, is portrayed in nose-numbing, frostbitten detail, and the contrast between the hyper-organized rescuers and the undisciplined men they ultimately saved makes the feat even more extraordinary". They concluded that the "book shares a thrilling and inspirational story of determination, perseverance, and bravery".

Multiple reviewers highlighted the inclusion of additional materials, including original language from participants, "drawn from their actual letters, diaries, journals and other personal reminiscences". Publishers Weekly noted how the book is "laced with journal entries and illustrated by informative maps and often breathtaking b&w photographs".

Kirkus Reviews and School Library Journal named it one of the best non-fiction children's books of 2012. The following year, it was nominated for the YALSA Award for Excellence in Nonfiction.

The Impossible Rescue is a Junior Library Guild book.
