= How the Beatles Changed the World (film) =

2017 documentary film

- Directed by: Tom O'Dell
- Written by: Tom O'Dell
- Starring: Jonathan Gould; Chris Ingham; Tony Bramwell; Bill Harry; Anthony DeCurtis; Robert Christgau; John Dunbar; Barry Miles; Mark Paytress
- Release date: 2017
- Running time: 110 minutes
- Country: United Kingdom
- Language: English

How the Beatles Changed the World is a 2017 documentary film directed by Tom O'Dell. The film argues that the English rock band the Beatles had a profound and lasting impact on art, culture, and music, a legacy that continues to this day. It also examines the group's influence on youth culture and anti-war movements.

The documentary features interviews with several notable figures, including Bill Harry, who arranged for Brian Epstein to see the Beatles perform in 1961, as well as music critic and writer Anthony DeCurtis, journalist Robert Christgau, and writer Barry Miles. The film also includes rare archival footage and photographs of the band.

How the Beatles Changed the World had its UK premiere on 23 October 2017 and received mixed reviews from critics.

== Reception ==
How the Beatles Changed the World received mixed reviews from critics. Upon the film's release, Ian Fortnam of Classic Rock wrote that the film "may leave the average armchair classic rock historian baffled by its very existence," though he added that it could serve as a useful resource for teaching 20th century history. In a later review for Stairway to 11, Wade Wainio concluded that the film was "a reasonably comprehensive look at their legacy." Similarly, writing for Decider, Benjamin H. Smith argued that while the film's opening sections were poorly made, it improved in later parts, ultimately finding "something new to say about [a] tired subject".

By contrast, some reviews were strongly negative. In a retrospective review for the blog Cult Following, Ewan Gleadow was highly critical of the film, writing, "All the usual shortcomings of the Beatles' documentarians are here."

== See also ==
- How the Beatles Changed the World, a children's book
