= Endless Harmony: The Beach Boys Story =

- Theatrical release poster
- Directed by: Alan Boyd
- Written by: Alan Boyd
- Produced by: Robert F. Katz; Stephanie Bennett
- Starring: Brian Wilson; Carl Wilson; Dennis Wilson; Mike Love; Al Jardine; Bruce Johnston; Tony Asher; Jan Berry; Dean Torrence
- Music by: The Beach Boys
- Production company: Capitol
- Distributed by: VH1
- Release date: August 27, 1998
- Running time: 141 minutes
- Country: United States
- Language: English

Endless Harmony: The Beach Boys Story is a 1998 biographical documentary directed by Alan Boyd. The film is a biography of the American rock band The Beach Boys. The documentary features archived footage and interviews by band members along with interviews from musicians such as Jackson Browne, Glen Campbell, Elvis Costello, and Sean Lennon. The soundtrack to the documentary was released along with the documentary's release.

== Certifications ==
Region	Certification	Certified units/sales
Australia (ARIA)	Gold	7,500^{^}
^{^} Shipments figures based on certification alone.
