= John & Yoko: Above Us Only Sky =

2018 documentary film

- Blu-ray cover
- Directed by: Michael Epstein
- Country of origin: United Kingdom
- Original language: English

Production
- Producer: Peter Worsley
- Production company: Eagle Rock Films

Original release
- Network: Channel 4
- Release: November 2018

John & Yoko: Above Us Only Sky is a 2018 British documentary film directed by Michael Epstein and produced by Peter Worsley. It aired on Channel 4 in November 2018 and on the A&E Network in March 2019.

The focus of the documentary is John Lennon's and Yoko Ono's relationship and how it impacted the Imagine album recorded in 1971 at their Tittenhurst Park home in Ascot, England. The film includes video footage not previously presented to the public, and present day interviews with former bandmates and others involved in Lennon's and Ono's lives at the time.

== See also ==
- Imagine: John Lennon (a 1988 British rockumentary film about English musician John Lennon)
- Imagine (1972 film)
- The Beatles in film
