= The Compleat Beatles =

- videocassette cover
- Directed by: Patrick Montgomery
- Written by: David Silver
- Produced by: Patrick Montgomery, Stephanie Bennett
- Starring: John Lennon; Paul McCartney; George Harrison; Ringo Starr; George Martin; Marianne Faithfull; Bruce Johnston; Billy J. Kramer; Gerry Marsden; Billy Preston; Lenny Kaye; Tony Sheridan
- Narrated by: Malcolm McDowell
- Music by: The Beatles
- Distributed by: MGM
- Release date: May 28, 1982
- Running time: 119 min.
- Language: English

The Compleat Beatles, released in 1982, is a two-hour documentary chronicling the career of the Beatles.

Narrated by actor Malcolm McDowell, it includes extensive interviews with a number of sources close to the Beatles. Some of the people interviewed are producer George Martin, their first manager Allan Williams, Cavern Club DJ Bob Wooler, music writer Bill Harry, and musicians Gerry Marsden, Billy J. Kramer, Marianne Faithfull, Billy Preston, Lenny Kaye, and Tony Sheridan. The film also includes archival footage of interviews with members of the Beatles and their manager Brian Epstein. Authors Nicholas Schaffner and Wilfrid Mellers are among the commentators who offer their views on the band's career. The Compleat Beatles also features early concert footage, behind-the-scenes background on the making of their albums, and candid footage of their often obsessed, hysterical fans.

Directed by Patrick Montgomery, the film was produced by Delilah Films/Electronic Arts Pictures and released on home video by Metro-Goldwyn-Mayer in 1984. Based on the popularity of the video release, the film was later made available theatrically in 16mm by TeleCulture Films, an independent company who previously channeled other small films to MGM for home video.

== Video releases ==
The Compleat Beatles was initially released as a PBS documentary in the United States, and then on VHS, Betamax, CED and Laserdisc that same year on the MGM/UA Home Video label. The 1982 Laserdisc was released in both analogue and stereo versions, as well as being released in Japan and England in 1983.
