= The Beatles: The First U.S. Visit =

- DVD cover of The Beatles: The First U.S. Visit
- Directed by: Albert and David Maysles
- Produced by: Stanley Hirson
- Starring: John Lennon; Paul McCartney; George Harrison; Ringo Starr; Ed Sullivan; Murray The K
- Distributed by: MPI Home Video (1991); Apple Films (2004)
- Release date: 13 November 1991
- Running time: 83 mins
- Language: English

The Beatles: The First U.S. Visit, released in 1991, is a re-edited version of the 1964 16mm documentary What's Happening! The Beatles in the U.S.A. by Albert and David Maysles.

Both versions follow the Beatles on their first trip to the United States as they travel to New York City, Washington, D.C., and Miami Beach. Most of the non-musical footage is of the Beatles in hotel rooms, often acting irreverently in front of the camera.

The new version is directed by Kathy Dougherty, Susan Froemke, and the Maysles. It is 83 minutes long, two minutes longer than the original. Among other changes, it adds 22 minutes of the Beatles' live recorded performances on The Ed Sullivan Show and removes several scenes with Brian Epstein.

The original film premiered on 13 November 1964 as a special episode of the CBS variety series The Entertainers. It is still shown at various festivals, such as Silverdocs in 2008, and was shown at a special screening at the Maysles Cinema in New York on 18 November 2011 in honor of Albert Maysles' 85th birthday.

Substantial footage from this documentary was digitally remastered and used in the 2024 documentary Beatles '64.

== Track listing ==
=== The Ed Sullivan Show (NYC #1) ===
1. "All My Loving"
2. "Till There Was You"
3. "She Loves You"
4. "I Want to Hold Your Hand"

=== The Washington Coliseum Concert ===
1. "I Saw Her Standing There"
2. "I Wanna Be Your Man"
3. "She Loves You"

=== The Ed Sullivan Show (Miami) ===
1. "From Me to You"
2. "This Boy"
3. "All My Loving"

=== The Ed Sullivan Show (NYC #2) ===
1. "Twist and Shout"
2. "Please Please Me"
3. "I Want to Hold Your Hand"

In addition to the live performances, the movie also features some Beatles studio recordings—"She Loves You", "I Saw Her Standing There", "Love Me Do", "I Want To Hold Your Hand" and "It Won't Be Long"—and other recordings such as "Navy Blue" by Diane Renay and "Pride and Joy" by Marvin Gaye.

== Certifications ==
Certifications and sales for The Beatles: The First U.S. Visit
Region	Certification	Certified units/sales
Argentina (CAPIF)	Platinum	8,000^{^}
Australia (ARIA)	Gold	7,500^{^}
Mexico (AMPROFON)	Gold	10,000^{^}
United Kingdom (BPI)	Gold	25,000^{*}
United States (RIAA)	2× Platinum	200,000^{^}
^{*} Sales figures based on certification alone.^{^} Shipments figures based on certification alone.
