= Patrick Montgomery =

American documentary film maker and photo archivist (born 1949)

- Born: September 13, 1949 (age 77); Cincinnati, Ohio, US
- Education: University of Notre Dame
- Occupations: Film and Photo Archivist
- Known for: The Man You Loved to Hate, The Compleat Beatles

Patrick Montgomery (born September 13, 1949) is an American documentary producer/director and film and photo archivist. He has specialized in making films using archival materials, most notably The Man You Loved to Hate (1979) about the legendary actor/director Erich Von Stroheim and The Compleat Beatles (1982) a two-hour documentary about the rise and fall of the world's most famous rock group. He also founded and ran Archive Films/Archive Photos, the largest independent commercial film and photo archive in the U.S. until its acquisition by The Image Bank, a division of Eastman Kodak, in 1997.

== Early life and education ==
Patrick Montgomery was born in Cincinnati on September 13, 1949. He graduated from St. Xavier High School in 1967 and received a Bachelor of Finance degree from the University of Notre Dame in 1971.

== Career ==
=== Cincinnati ===
Montgomery began his career in 1972 as a marketing executive at Audio Visual Enterprises, Inc, a firm founded by former Cincinnati Symphony General Manager Lloyd Haldeman to distribute opera and ballet films for home viewing on videodisc.

=== New York – Killiam Shows and Film Production ===
Montgomery moved to New York in 1974 and landed a job with Killiam Shows, Inc., a company founded in the early 1950s by Paul Killiam to acquire, restore and distribute American silent films and produce television programs about them. While with Killiam, he was involved in the restoration and distribution of many classic films, including F.W. Murnau’s Sunrise (1927) and It (1927), starring Clara Bow.

Montgomery was also a founding member of the Non-Theatrical Film Distributors Association in 1974. His first film as a producer/director (with Luciano Martenengo) was George Melies: Cinema Magician (1978), produced for Blackhawk Films, followed by The Man You Loved To Hate (1979), a co-production with the BBC and Norddeutscher Rundfunk. In his New York Times review, Vincent Canby called The Man You Loved To Hate “cinema history of both entertaining and high order.”

In 1979, Montgomery formed Archive Film Productions, Inc. In 1980 he produced the documentary John Schelsinger Directs the Tales of Hoffmann for the newly formed Bravo Channel and in 1981 served as the line producer for an independent feature film called New York Beat, starring a then unknown Jean Michel Basquiat, which was eventually released in 2000 as Downtown 81. In 1982, he directed and produced The Compleat Beatles with Delilah Films, which was distributed by MGM/UA Home Video. and released theatrically by Teleculture, Inc in 1984. The Compleat Beatles was one of the first original productions to be awarded Platinum status by the RIAA for sales of over $2 million in the nascent home video market. This was followed by Rock and Roll: The Early Days (1984) and British Rock: The First Wave (1985), both released by RCA/Columbia Home Video. In a 2025 article, The New York Times described The Compleat Beatles as “The Great Beatles Documentary That’s Nearly Impossible to See (Legally).”

In 1985, he served as Archival Consultant on eighteen documentaries produced for Pepsi’s A Walk Thru Rock touring show, and in the same capacity on the NBC Network tribute Looney Tunes 50th Anniversary (1986). In 1987 he produced the TV special We’ll Be Right Back about classic television commercials for Nickelodeon, and in 1989 produced Creepy Classics, an original video release for Hallmark Cards about classic horror films.

From 1993 to 1995, he served as Executive Producer on a number of programs for A & E's Biography series, including films about Bing Crosby, Sid Caesar, Sammy Davis Jr, Humphrey Bogart, and Milton Berle.

=== Archive Films & Archive Photos ===
In the mid-1980s, Montgomery turned his focus from making documentaries to building an archival stock footage library called Archive Films. By the early 1990s, the company had become the largest in the U.S., with its headquarters in New York City and satellite offices in London, Paris, Stockholm, Cologne, Amsterdam, Milan and Tokyo. He then began to branch out into archival stock photos and acquired the photo agencies Frederick Lewis, Inc and Pictorial Parade, Inc and several other photo collections to form Archive Photos. In addition to its own collections, Archive Photos also represented Reuters, The New York Times, The George Eastman House and others for archival photo licensing.

In 1997, he sold his company, Archive Holdings, Inc, which by then had grown to 120 employees in the New York office, to The Image Bank, then a division of Eastman Kodak, and continued to run the company until 1999, also serving on The Image Bank's executive committee.

=== Archive Farms Inc ===
In 2007, Montgomery formed Archive Farms Inc, to manage the archival film and photo collections he had acquired or assembled since selling to The Image Bank, most notably, The Travel Film Archive, which owns the collections of several important travelogue film makers including Burton Holmes, Andre de la Varre, and James Fitzpatrick, and The Bert Morgan Archive, which he acquired from the heirs of high society photographer Bert Morgan in 2009. The company also represents The Caribbean Photo Archive and The History of Photography Archive, two private collections of 19th century photography assembled by Montgomery over a ten-year period.

Working from these collections, Montgomery has curated several museum exhibitions including Southampton Blue Book, 1930 to 1960: Photographs by Bert Morgan (2014) at the Southampton Historical Museum, Awakening Jamaica, Photographs by Valentine and Sons, 1891 (2015) at HistoryMiami, Palm Beach Society Photography of Bert Morgan (2016) at The Preservation Foundation of Palm Beach, Historic Nassau (2016) at the Spady Cultural History Museum in Delray Beach, Florida, and Young Jackie on the South Fork at the East Hampton Historical Society (2017).

== Other activities ==
From 2001 to 2019, Montgomery served as a member of the Board of Trustees of The George Eastman House Museum in Rochester, NY. He was named Vice Chairman of the Board in 2004 and has served as chairman of both the Photography Acquisition Committee and the Conservation Committee. He was also on the Board of Trustees of The Film Forum in New York City from 2008 until 2013, and served on the advisory board of Witness from 2001 to 2006. He has been a member of the Grolier Club since 2017 and currently serves as Co-Chair of the Club’s Photography Special Interest Group. He is also a member of the National Gallery of Art’s Photography Initiative and of The Museum of Fine Arts Houston’s Photography Subcommittee.

In 2019, he sold the original photographs from The Caribbean Photo Archive to the Art Gallery of Ontario In Toronto and it is now known as The Montgomery Collection of Caribbean Photographs. Fragments of Epic Memory, the first exhibition at the AGO based on The Montgomery Collection, which opened on September 1, 2021, was named by Hyperallergic as one of the Best of 2021: Our Top 10 Exhibitions Around the World.

== Filmography ==
- George Melies: Cinema Magician (1978)
- The Man You Loved To Hate (1979)
- John Schelsinger Directs the Tales of Hoffmann (1980)
- The Compleat Beatles (1982)
- Rock and Roll: The Early Days (1984)
- British Rock: The First Wave (1985)
- We’ll Be Right Back (1987)
- Creepy Classics (1989)
