= Bloomsbury Publishing =

British worldwide publishing house

Bloomsbury Publishing plc
- Status: Active
- Traded as: LSE: BMY
- Founded: 26 September 1986; 39 years ago
- Country of origin: United Kingdom
- Headquarters location: London, England
- Distribution: Macmillan Publishers Services (UK); United Book Distributors (Australia); Hachette Book Group (US)
- Key people: John Bason (Non-executive Chairman); Nigel Newton (Chief Executive)
- Publication types: Books, digital content products, and online resources such as databases
- Imprints: Bloomsbury Academic; Bloomsbury Methuen Drama (New York City); Company
- ISIN: GB0033147751
- Founder: Nigel Newton
- Headquarters: United Kingdom
- Revenue: ▼£325.9 million (2026)
- Operating income: ▲£35.4 million (2026)
- Net income: ▲£27.0 million (2026)
- Official website: www.bloomsbury.com

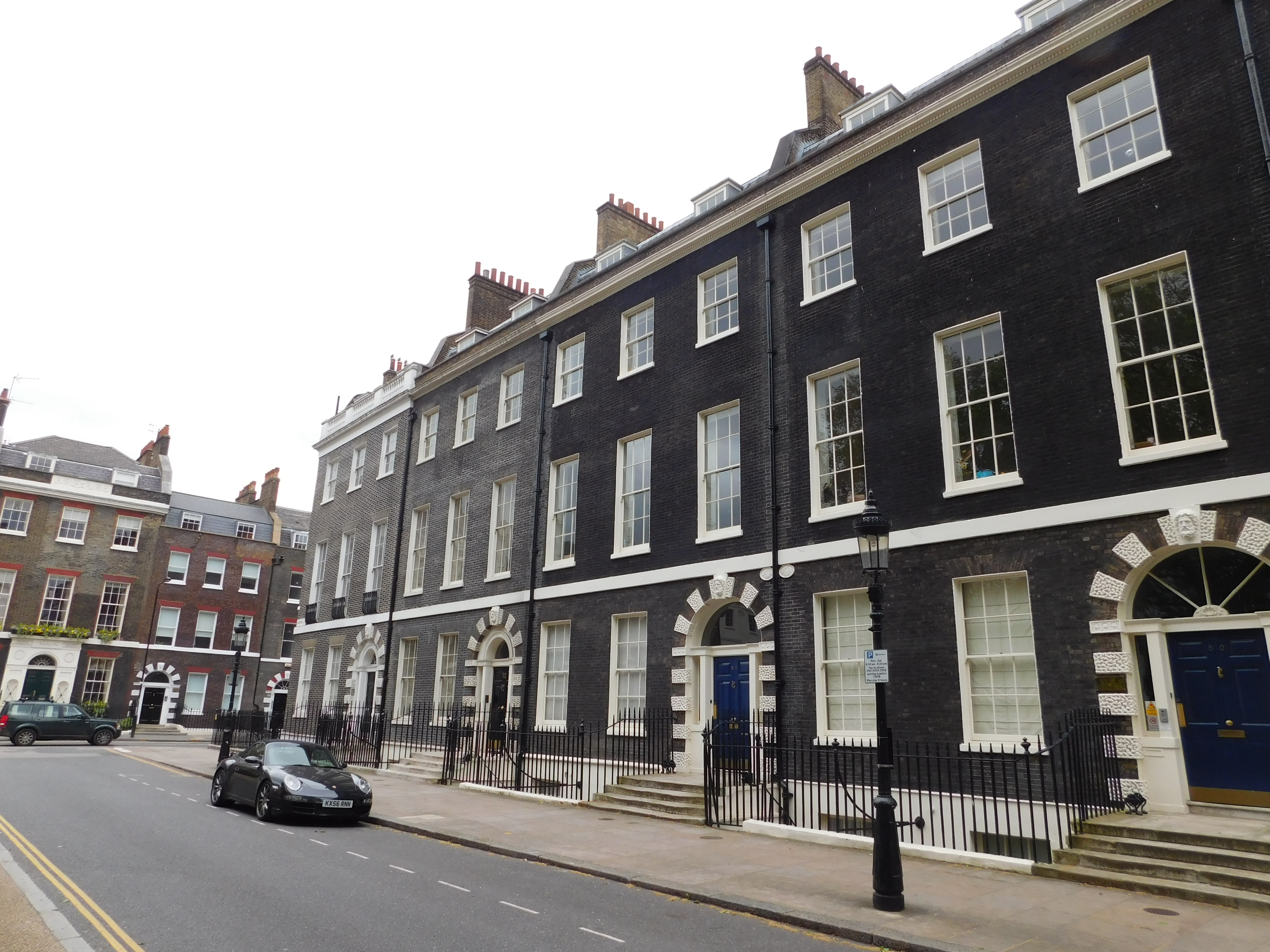
Bloomsbury Publishing's headquarters in Bedford Square (extreme right)

Bloomsbury Publishing plc is a British worldwide publishing house of fiction and non-fiction. Bloomsbury's head office is located on Bedford Square in Bloomsbury, an area of the London Borough of Camden. It has a US publishing office located in New York City, an India publishing office in New Delhi, an Australian sales office in Sydney CBD, and other publishing offices in the UK, including in Oxford. The company is listed on the London Stock Exchange and is a constituent of the FTSE 250 Index.

== History ==
The company was founded in 1986 by Nigel Newton, who had previously been employed by other publishing companies. It was floated on the London Stock Exchange with a valuation of £9 million in 1994.

For much of its existence, Bloomsbury was a minor player in the British publishing scene. In 1997, Bloomsbury took a chance on publishing the Harry Potter series after it had been rejected by multiple publishers.

A rights issue of shares in 1998 further raised £6.1 million, which was used to expand the company, in particular to found a U.S. branch. In 1998, Bloomsbury USA was established. Bloomsbury USA Books for Young Readers was established in 2002, and in 2005, Bloomsbury acquired Walker & Co, a small company dedicated to publishing nonfiction. The Walker brand was discontinued in 2015 and sold to Walker Publishing Company.

== Bloomsbury US ==
Bloomsbury US was established in 1998 in New York, New York, as a general interest publisher of both adult and children's books. It is known for its high-quality fiction and non-fiction as well as its extensive academic publishing branch.

Its notable titles have include Anthony Bourdain's global bestseller Kitchen Confidential, Jesmyn Ward's National Book Award winner Salvage the Bones, the works of 2021 Nobel Prize in Literature winner Abdulrazak Gurnah, Susanna Clark's Women's Prize for Fiction winner Piranesi, Renée Watson's Newbery Honor Book Piecing Me Together, Martin W. Sandler's National Book Award winner 1919, and titles by renowned authors Paul Beatty, Roz Chast, Edmund White, Elif Shafak, Carol Anderson, Mark Kurlansky, Miriam Toews, Samantha Shannon, and Deborah Levy.

In 2021, Bloomsbury US acquired ABC-CLIO LLC, the established academic publisher of both print and digital materials, for $22.9 million. In 2024, Bloomsbury US finalized the asset purchase of Rowman & Littlefield, an independent academic publisher, for $83 million. The sale included rights to the publisher's academic imprints and associated titles, doubling the size of Bloomsbury US's Academic & Professional divisions.

== Bloomsbury Qatar ==
In December 2008, Bloomsbury opened a branch in Doha, Qatar, in a joint-partnership with Qatar Foundation. The partnership created a publishing house, Bloomsbury Qatar Foundation Publishing; it worked mainly with English and Arabic literature.

Bloomsbury Qatar Foundation Journals (BQFJ), an open access and peer reviewed academic publisher, was created in December 2010 as a joint venture with Qatar Foundation. Journal research articles were published through BQFJ's website QScience.com. The company's partnership with Qatar Foundation ended in December 2015 and all of Bloomsbury Qatar Foundation Publishing works were incorporated in Qatari-owned HBKU Press. At the time of BQFP's dissolution it had published over 200 books. BQFJ's works were also incorporated in HBKU Press.

In 2012, Bloomsbury established a publishing office in India.

In 2018, an article disclosed that much of the profit in the children's division was due to the Harry Potter series by J. K. Rowling.

In May 2023, an article in The Verge reported that the cover of the UK edition of House of Earth and Blood, published by Bloomsbury, uses an AI-generated image.

== Acquisitions and imprints ==
Among the companies, book lists and imprints that Bloomsbury has acquired are:

- Bloomsbury Academic (1986)
- A & C Black (2000)
- Whitaker's Almanack (2002)
- T & AD Poyser (2002)
- Thomas Reed Publications (2002)
- Peter Collin Publishing (2002)
- Andrew Brodie Publications (2003)
- Adlard Coles Nautical (2003)
- Walker Publishing Company (2004)
- Methuen Drama (2006)
- Berg Publishers (2008)
- John Wisden & Co (2008)
- Arden Shakespeare (2008)
- Tottel Publishing (2009)
- Bristol Classical Press (2010)
- Continuum International Publishing Group (2011)
- Absolute Press (2011)
- Fairchild Books (2012)
- Applied Visual Arts Publishing (2012)
- Hart Publishing (2013)
- Osprey Publishing (2014)
- I.B. Tauris (2018)
- Oberon Books (2019)
- Zed Books (2020)
- Red Globe Press (2021)
- Head of Zeus (2021)
- ABC-CLIO (2021)
- Libraries Unlimited (2022)
- Rowman & Littlefield (2024)
- Lexington Books (2024)
- Applause Books (2024)
- Backbeat Books (2024)
