= How the Beatles Changed the World =

2014 book by Martin W. Sandler

- Author: Martin W. Sandler
- Publisher: Walker Books
- Publication date: February 4, 2014
- ISBN: 978-0-8027-3565-2

How the Beatles Changed the World is a 2014 non-fiction children's book by American writer and historian Martin W. Sandler. The book details the history of the English rock band The Beatles, organized topically with "thematic chapters on the band's impact on individual aspects of culture", ranging from their impact on fashion to "the feelings that Western music stirred in young people east of the Iron Curtain". The book draws heavily from "contemporary interviews with band members themselves and those close to them" and contains various relevant photographs.

== Reception ==
How the Beatles Changed the World is a Junior Library Guild book. It received mixed reviews from critics.

Kirkus Reviews referred to it as "a well-researched and attractively presented look in words and pictures", whereas Publishers Weekly described it as an "appreciative and intelligent examination of the far-reaching effects of Beatlemania". They highlighted how "Sandler captures the fanaticism of screaming fans, whose increasingly frenzied behavior eventually led the Fab Four to fear for their safety and precipitated their decision to stop touring and instead concentrate on recording albums." School Library Journal's Joy Piedmont referred to the book's contents as "accurate, if unfailingly laudatory and occasionally repetitious".

In a mixed review, Elizabeth Bush, writing for The Bulletin of the Center for Children's Books, found that the "organizational switches between chronological narration and subject themes ... require nimbleness on the reader's part to keep milestones in alignment, and not every picture in Sandler's extensive photo gallery matches neatly with text". She further noted that "readers who truly want to understand social and musical forces behind the hoopla will find the context a bit thin, with only a couple of lines addressing the dynamics of, for example, the Vietnam War and the Rolling Stones."
