= Stephanie Bennett (producer) =

English film producer

Stephanie Bennett (born Margaret Stephanie Bennett) is an English film producer known for her works Hail! Hail! Rock 'n' Roll and Endless Harmony.

== Biography ==
Stephanie Bennett established Delilah Films, her first production company, after co-producing The Compleat Beatles in 1984 which sold over one million copies and became a model for the company's future documentaries and concert films.

Bennett has worked with musical artists around the world, including The Beach Boys, Joni Mitchell, The Everly Brothers, Chuck Berry and Roy Orbison. She went on to produce Endless Harmony: The Beach Boys, Woman Of Heart And Mind: The Joni Mitchell Story, The Everly Brothers Reunion Concert, Rock ’n’ Roll Odyssey, and Hail, Hail Rock ’n’ Roll about Chuck Berry. Bennett's Endless Harmony was nominated for a Long Form Music Video Grammy Award in 2001.

Bennett also created Cinemax Sessions, a series focusing on music legends and artists paying tribute to them, including Roy Orbison's Black and White Night, featuring Bruce Springsteen, Elvis Costello, Bonnie Raitt, Jackson Browne, KD Lang, JD Souther and T-Bone Burnett, backed by James Burton and Elvis Presley's band.

Delilah Films has also produced numerous documentaries and concerts for PBS, MTV, VHI, and HBO, including Tom Petty: Going Home, Black Sabbath: Volumes One And Two, and Foreigner: Their Story

Bennett has also established a New Zealand–based production company, Rongo Productions. She is currently working on "Mindspaces: The Artists Studio with Denis O'Connor"'.

== Filmography ==
- Cool Cats: 25 Years of Rock 'n Roll Style
- The Compleat Beatles
- Hail! Hail! Rock 'n' Roll
- Joni Mitchell: Woman of Heart & Mind
- A Reggae Session
- Roy Orbison and Friends: A Black and White Night
- Smokey Robinson: The Quiet Legend
- Toots and Maytals: Live From New Orleans
- Ray Charles: A Romantic Evening at the McCallum Theater
- Deep Purple: Heavy Metal Pioneers
- The Doors: Live in Europe 1968
- Black Sabbath: The Black Sabbath Story, Volume 1
- Troubadours of Folk Music
- The Beach Boys: Nashville Sounds
- Hey, Hey We're the Monkees
- Endless Harmony: The Beach Boys Story
- Chapel of Love: Jeff Barry and Friends
- Shining Stars: The Story of Earth, Wind and Fire
- The Doors: Soundstage Performances
- Return to 'Sin City': A Tribute to Gram Parsons
- On Stage at the World Cafe Live (Television)
- Chicago and Earth, Wind, & Fire
- Boys II Men Motown: A journey through Hitsville USA Live
- Chris Bailey: Ringa Whau
- Headland: Where Nature meets Sculpture
- Christine: The Artist Goldsmith
