= Derek Taylor =

English journalist, writer, publicist and record producer

- Taylor in 1970
- Born: Derek Wyn Taylor; 7 May 1932; Wirral, England
- Died: 8 September 1997 (aged 65); Brundon, Suffolk, England
- Occupations: Journalist; writer; publicist; record producer
- Spouse: Joan Doughty (m. 1958)
- Children: 6
- Writing career
- Years active: 1949−1997
- Notable works: A Cellarful of Noise (co-author); I, Me, Mine (editor)

Derek Wyn Taylor (7 May 1932 – 8 September 1997) was a British journalist, writer, publicist and record producer. He is best known for his role as press officer to the Beatles, with whom he worked in 1964 and then from 1968 to 1970, and was one of several associates to earn the moniker "the Fifth Beatle". Before returning to London to head the publicity for the Beatles' Apple Corps organisation in 1968, he worked as the publicist for California-based bands such as the Byrds, the Beach Boys and the Mamas and the Papas. Taylor was known for his forward-thinking and extravagant promotional campaigns, exemplified in taglines such as "The Beatles Are Coming" and "Brian Wilson Is a Genius". He was equally dedicated to the 1967 Summer of Love ethos and helped stage that year's Monterey Pop Festival.

Taylor started his career as a local journalist on the Wirral, now part of Merseyside, aged 17 working for the Hoylake and West Kirby Advertiser followed by the Liverpool Daily Post and Echo. He then became a North England-based writer for national British newspapers that included the News Chronicle, the Sunday Dispatch and the Sunday Express. He also served as a regular columnist and theatre critic for the Daily Express from 1952. During the 1970s, Taylor worked for Warner Bros. Records and then HandMade Films. The term "pocket symphony" is generally attributed to Taylor for his description of the Beach Boys' 1966 single "Good Vibrations".

A trusted confidant of the Beatles, Taylor remained particularly close to George Harrison long after the band's break-up and maintained a friendship with John Lennon until the latter's murder in 1980. In addition to working as editor on Harrison's 1980 autobiography, I, Me, Mine, Taylor authored books such as As Time Goes By, The Making of Raiders of The Lost Ark, Fifty Years Adrift (In An Open Necked Shirt) and It Was Twenty Years Ago Today. Having returned to Apple in the early 1990s, Taylor died of cancer in September 1997 while working on the Beatles Anthology book.

== Work with the Beatles ==
Taylor was a national journalist working for the Daily Express when he was assigned to write a review of a Beatles concert on 30 May 1963. He had been expected by his editors to write a piece critical of what at that time was considered by the national press as an inconsequential teen fad. However, he was enchanted by the group and instead sang their praises. Shortly afterwards, he was invited to meet the Beatles and soon became a trusted journalist in their circle, especially as he was a fellow Liverpudlian.

As the band gained national attention in Britain, Taylor's editors conceived of running a column ostensibly written by a Beatle to boost circulation, to be ghostwritten by Taylor. George Harrison was the Beatle eventually decided upon. Although Harrison was initially only given the right to approve or disapprove of the content, Harrison's dissection of the first draft turned the column into an ongoing collaboration between the two, with Harrison providing the stories and Taylor providing the polish.

In early 1964, Beatles manager Brian Epstein hired Taylor away from his newspaper job, putting him in charge of Beatles press releases, and acting as media liaison for himself and the group. He subsequently became Epstein's personal assistant for a short period. Taylor assisted Epstein in the writing of his autobiography, A Cellarful of Noise. Taylor conducted interviews with Epstein for the book and then shaped the transcriptions of the audio recordings into a narrative, retaining most of Epstein's basic words.

Taylor served as press officer for the Beatles' first concert tour of the US in the summer of 1964. After a falling out with Epstein, he resigned from his position at the end of the tour, in September. Brian Epstein demanded that Taylor continue working for a three-month notice period, however. After this, he went to work for the Daily Mirror.

== As a publicist in California ==
In 1965, Taylor left the UK and moved with his growing family to California. There he started his own public relations company, providing publicity for groups such as the Byrds, the Beach Boys and Paul Revere and the Raiders, as well as the Mamas & the Papas. According to music critic Richie Unterberger, through his time working in Hollywood, Taylor "became, probably, the most famous rock publicist of the mid-'60s".

Among Taylor's strategies, he touted the Byrds as a new breed of American band with parallels to the Beatles. He also encouraged nascent rock journalists to perceive Beach Boys founder Brian Wilson as a musical genius. Using his connections in Britain, Taylor ensured that the Beach Boys' 1966 album Pet Sounds received a level of acclaim from UK music critics and Wilson's peers, including John Lennon and Paul McCartney, that had not been forthcoming in the United States.

In June 1967, Taylor helped organise the Monterey Pop Festival, serving as the event's publicist and spokesman. For a few weeks in the autumn of 1967, Taylor hosted a Sunday-evening freeform radio program on Pasadena station KRLA. Having contributed to the station's magazine, KRLA Beat, since 1965, he became editor in 1967, helping to guide the magazine's focus towards US countercultural issues and psychedelia.

George Harrison's song "Blue Jay Way" was written during Harrison's 1967 visit to California, on a foggy night waiting for Taylor and his wife Joan to arrive at his rented home in the Hollywood Hills. During the same visit, Taylor accompanied Harrison on his trip to the Haight-Ashbury district of San Francisco.

Taylor was a catalyst in Harry Nilsson's musical career; hearing Nilsson's song "1941" on a car radio, he bought a case (twenty-five copies) of his album Pandemonium Shadow Show, sending copies to various members of the music-industry. Among the recipients were all four Beatles, who became enamoured of Nilsson's talent and invited him to London. Nilsson subsequently became a collaborator and good friend of both Lennon and Ringo Starr. In 1973, Taylor produced Nilsson's album A Little Touch of Schmilsson in the Night.

== The Beatles' Apple Corps ==
In April 1968, at Harrison's request, Taylor returned to England to work for the Beatles again, as the press officer for their newly created Apple Corps. Taylor oversaw the public launch of the company's record label, Apple Records, in August 1968, marked by the release of the Beatles' single "Hey Jude". As part of the campaign, "Hey Jude" and three other Apple Corps singles were compiled in a gift box and dispatched to Queen Elizabeth II, the Queen Mother and the British prime minister. During this period, Taylor frequently clashed with Paul McCartney, about whom he later wrote: "I don't think I ever hated anyone as much as I hated Paul in the summer of 1968." That same year, Taylor provided uncredited contributions to the lyrics of two songs issued on the band's double album, The Beatles: "Happiness Is a Warm Gun" and "Savoy Truffle".

Between 1968 and 1970, Taylor had a major role in the company's activities, leading the publicity campaigns for the band's projects and for those of the other artists signed to Apple Records. Among these, he helped stage Lennon and Yoko Ono's 1969 campaign for world peace. He is named in the lyrics of Lennon's song "Give Peace a Chance", along with Tommy Smothers, Timothy Leary and Norman Mailer, who like Taylor were all present at the recording of the song. In March 1970, Taylor commissioned the young photographer Les Smithers to photograph Badfinger, a rock band signed to Apple Records. That portrait has now been acquired by the National Portrait Gallery.

Taylor's time as Apple Corps' press officer became as notable for its extravagance as much as the creativity of his campaigns and press releases. With the appointment of Allen Klein as Apple's business manager in early 1969 – leading to a period that Taylor later described as "miserable" – expenditure and staff numbers were cut back drastically. While describing Taylor as a "lavish spender", author Nick Talveski notes that much of his job entailed denying the media access to the Beatles. Talveski adds: "To his eternal credit, Taylor nevertheless became one of the most popular professionals in the [music] industry, one of very few men to perfect the art of saying 'no' graciously." In her 2009 memoir, former Apple employee Chris O'Dell says that Taylor "stood for everything that was good and honest and funny and bright about Apple".

Taylor left the company in late 1970, having outlasted most of the other senior employees there, thanks to the affection and high regard in which he was held by Lennon, Harrison and Starr. In April that year, Taylor had confirmed The Beatles' break-up using deliberately vague terms, partly to mask his sadness:

Spring is here and Leeds play Chelsea tomorrow and Ringo and John and George and Paul are alive and well and full of hope. The world is still spinning and so are we and so are you. When the spinning stops – that'll be the time to worry. Not before …

== After the Beatles ==
Taylor went to work for the newly launched UK record company WEA (later Warner Music Group), the British umbrella company that distributed and marketed several labels owned in the US by Kinney National Company. These record labels included Warner Bros., Reprise, Elektra and Atlantic. Taylor served as Director of Special Projects, working with artists such as the Rolling Stones, Yes, America, Neil Young, Vivian Stanshall, Carly Simon and Alice Cooper. He also presided over a revival of British jazz singer George Melly, producing two albums for him. He was instrumental in signing seminal Liverpool Art School rock band Deaf School, featuring future record producer Clive Langer. He was instrumental in the Rhead Brothers signing to WEA and received a dedication on both their 1977 album Dedicate and the re-issued Black Shaheen (2017).

Independently of his work for WEA, Taylor co-produced Nilsson's A Little Touch of Schmilsson in the Night in 1973. He had previously provided liner notes for Nilsson's Aerial Ballet album. (A story written by Taylor's daughter Vanessa was printed on the back cover of Nilsson's album Harry.)

== Return to the United States ==
In the mid-1970s Taylor served as a vice-president of Marketing for Warner Bros. Records, where he was instrumental in the acquisition of the Rutles project, and supervised the worldwide marketing campaign for the album release and television special. A spoof on the Beatles' career and legacy, the Rutles' All You Need Is Cash special featured Harrison playing a reporter interviewing a Derek Taylor-like character, named Eric Manchester and played by Michael Palin. Taylor left Warner's in 1978. As well as staying close to Harrison throughout the 1970s, Taylor maintained a correspondence with Lennon during the latter's years of retirement between 1975 and 1980. Taylor did not enjoy his second period in California, however, and returned to England after a couple of years.

== Back in England ==
In the early 1980s he worked as a co-author on books with Michelle Phillips and Steven Spielberg. He also worked with George Harrison's film company, Handmade Films.

In January 1988, while accepting the Beatles' induction into the Rock and Roll Hall of Fame, Harrison named Taylor and Neil Aspinall as the two people worthy of the much-used title "the Fifth Beatle". In the early 1990s Taylor was asked to rejoin Apple to be in charge of marketing of the multiple projects planned for that decade. The projects included the CD release of the non-Beatle Apple catalogue and major Beatles releases such as Live at the BBC and compilation albums associated with The Beatles Anthology.

== Work as an author ==
In 1973 he wrote a very informal memoir, As Time Goes By, published by Sphere Books and reprinted by its Abacus imprint the following year. (It was re-issued in 2018.)

Over 1978–79, Taylor collaborated again with Harrison, helping him to complete his autobiography, I, Me, Mine, published in 1980 by Genesis Publications. The following year, Taylor's on-set account of the production of Raiders of the Lost Ark was published as The Making of Raiders of The Lost Ark by Ballantine Books. He subsequently wrote his own autobiography, Fifty Years Adrift, published in December 1983 by Genesis, for which Harrison provided a glowing introduction to the signed, limited-edition volume. Only 2000 copies were printed, and the book quickly became a collector's item after Harrison joined Taylor in promoting the publication.

In 1987, Taylor's It Was Twenty Years Ago Today (published by Bantam Press in the UK, and Fireside for Simon & Schuster in the US) celebrated the twentieth anniversary of the release of the Beatles' Sgt. Pepper's Lonely Hearts Club Band. It provides a detailed documentary of the people and events that shaped the album and the wider events of the Summer of Love counterculture. The book includes archive interviews and photographs as well as extensive transcripts from a Granada TV documentary, which was also titled It Was Twenty Years Ago Today and for which Taylor served as consultant.

As Time Goes By: Living in the Sixties (Rock and Roll Remembrances Series No 3) (Popular Culture Ink) was published in June 1990 in the US.

Getting sober...and loving it!, co-authored with his wife Joan Taylor, was released in 1992. The book collects personal experiences from alcoholics, including himself, combined with practical information. Ringo Starr wrote the foreword.

In the UK Bois Books published What You Cannot Finish and Take A Sad Song in 1995, coinciding with the release of the Beatles Anthology (Taylor was extensively interviewed for the TV program). Posthumous volumes include Beatles (Ebury Press 1999). In addition, an audio CD, Here There and Everywhere: Derek Taylor Interviews The Beatles, was released on the Thunderbolt label in 2001.

== Death ==
Taylor died of throat cancer at his home, Brundon Mill, near Sudbury, Suffolk, on 8 September 1997, aged 65. At the time of his death he was still working for Apple Corps, helping to compile the Beatles Anthology book. Harrison, Aspinall, Palin, Neil Innes and Jools Holland attended his funeral in Sudbury, Suffolk on 12 September.

== Personal life ==
Taylor was married to Joan Taylor (née Doughty) from 1958 until his death. They had six children. Joan Taylor appeared in the 2011 documentary George Harrison: Living in the Material World.

In 2013 American singer and Fleetwood Mac vocalist Stevie Nicks said that she had had a brief affair with Taylor in the late 1970s, and that she wrote the song "Beautiful Child", included in the album Tusk, about him.
