= It Was Twenty Years Ago Today (film) =

- Packaging for the DVD release
- Written by: Colin Bell
- Directed by: John Sheppard
- Starring: Peter Coyote; Peter Fonda; Allen Ginsberg; George Harrison; Abbie Hoffman; Timothy Leary; Paul McCartney; Derek Taylor
- Country of origin: United Kingdom

Production
- Producers: Simon Albury, John Sheppard
- Running time: 105 mins (approx.)

Original release
- Release: 1 June 1987

It Was Twenty Years Ago Today (also known as Sgt. Pepper: It Was Twenty Years Ago Today) is a 1987 British-made television documentary film about the 1967 Summer of Love. It premiered on 1 June 1987, twenty years after the official release date of the Beatles' album Sgt. Pepper's Lonely Hearts Club Band, and presents the album as the central factor behind the events and scenes that led to the full emergence of the 1960s counterculture.

The film was directed by John Sheppard for Granada Television. In addition to archive footage, it features interviews with key figures from the period, including Derek Taylor (who also served as consultant on the production), George Harrison, Paul McCartney, Allen Ginsberg, Abbie Hoffman and Timothy Leary.

Its release was accompanied by the book It Was Twenty Years Ago Today, written by Taylor. After the documentary's initial broadcast on the ITV network in the United Kingdom, the film’s North American premiere was on CBC-TV two days later. It was shown a few months later in the United States on PBS in November 1987.

== Historical context ==
Together with the Monterey International Pop Festival, held in California on 16–18 June 1967, the release of the Beatles' Sgt. Pepper's Lonely Hearts Club Band is usually cited by historians as the start of the Summer of Love. Sociomusicologist Simon Frith described 1967 as the year that "it all came together", in terms of the realisation of the 1960s youth movement's search for independence from societal norms and a new path dedicated to enlightenment. This movement manifested as a counterculture, embracing communal living, pacifism, consciousness-raising hallucinogenic drugs, psychedelic fashions and art, and Indian mysticism. The main centre was the Haight-Ashbury district of San Francisco, while movements were also underway in London, Los Angeles, New York, Amsterdam, Berlin and Paris. Timothy Leary, a former Harvard professor, extolled students and young professionals to "Turn on, tune in, drop out", a phrase that became a catch-cry for the hippie phenomenon. With the Beatles as the most popular and influential act of the era, music was the principal agent of these changes. Having become a leading publicist in Los Angeles following his work with the Beatles in 1964, Derek Taylor co-founded the Monterey festival. This event showcased the diversity of musical styles and influences that constituted the new "rock" medium, as well as pop music's ascendancy to the level of art.

Pop's maturity beyond the category of teenage entertainment had only recently been recognised at this time. In the United States, it was marked by the appointment of the first rock critic, Richard Goldstein, at The Village Voice in June 1966 and, in April the following year, the screening of a television documentary hosted by classical composer Leonard Bernstein, Inside Pop: The Rock Revolution. The latter sought to explain the merits of contemporary pop music to a mainstream audience and demystify the generation gap it represented. In Britain, the authorities had begun clamping down on the perceived threat posed by pop musicians and members of the UK underground. These measures included the arrest of Rolling Stones members Mick Jagger and Keith Richards on drugs charges, to which The Times responded with an editorial titled "Who Breaks a Butterfly upon a Wheel?", and the attempted closure of the International Times.

It Was Twenty Years Ago Today was directed and produced by John Sheppard, whose previous television work included directing musical performances on the 1960s pop program Ready Steady Go! and making pioneering segments for Granada's World in Action current affairs shows. Sheppard said of 1967: "That summer there was a social, sexual and musical revolution and Sgt. Pepper was at the heart of it. It was the year of the hippie, of Peace, Flower Power and the Summer of Love. All over the world young people were experimenting with new ways of living and seeking to create a better future. Hope was in the air."

== Film content ==
The film includes footage from ITN's report from outside EMI Studios on 20 December 1966, early in the recording sessions for Sgt. Pepper. Each of the Beatles is asked to comment on rumours that the band are splitting up in the wake of an announcement that they had retired from live performance. Recalling the inspiration behind the album twenty years later, Paul McCartney says: "we started to incorporate more of the crazy life that we were living at the time into the music. We started to believe there weren't that many frontiers, not too many barriers, really …"

Allen Ginsberg, an American poet and counterculture figure, is shown providing a rundown of the album's themes, song by song. Ginsberg remarks on the joyous celebration of life expressed throughout Sgt. Pepper. Latter-day commentary on the album and the Summer of Love is also provided by George Harrison, Taylor, Leary and Yippie activist Abbie Hoffman. Other interviewees include William Rees-Mogg (former editor of The Times), Barry Miles (International Times), Hollywood actors Peter Fonda and Peter Coyote (the latter a countercultural playwright in 1967 and a member of the San Francisco diggers), music critic William Mann, musicologist Wilfrid Mellers, and Californian musicians Roger McGuinn, Paul Kantner and Michelle Phillips. The only female interviewee, Phillips recalls the ethos behind the Summer of Love: "We were going to take care of the world and its problems, and we were going to do it through a unified front of people who cared."

Among footage used to establish the context of 1967 is film of Jagger and Richards' court hearing and, following their acquittal, Jagger's arrival by helicopter to meet with establishment figures such as the Archbishop of Canterbury. Aside from the Beatles, contemporary music is represented through footage of Bob Dylan, the Rolling Stones, the Byrds, the Grateful Dead, Jefferson Airplane, Otis Redding, Jimi Hendrix, Pink Floyd, Buffalo Springfield and Janis Joplin. The era's fascination with India is represented by archival film of Indian classical musician Ravi Shankar and Maharishi Mahesh Yogi, whose Transcendental Meditation technique the Beatles soon turned to as an alternative to LSD. The film and television clips also include footage of the Human Be-In and other hippie events in Haight-Ashbury, and anti-Vietnam War demonstrations. The ideological division between hippies and the older generation is shown in footage of tourist coach trips around Haight-Ashbury, and a clip from Inside Pop in which, referring to a character in Dylan's song "Ballad of a Thin Man", Leonard Bernstein asks: "You know who Mr Jones is, don't you? Us!"

Performances are shown from the Monterey Pop Festival, as is the Beatles' appearance, before an audience estimated at up to 400 million, on the Our World satellite broadcast, where they performed the purpose-written song "All You Need Is Love". The film also covers the attempted levitation of the Pentagon in Washington, DC, an event initiated by Hoffman in October 1967. In the conclusion to the documentary, several of the interviewees are asked whether they believe that "Love is all you need", as the Beatles had contended in "All You Need Is Love". Harrison, McCartney and Coyote agree that it is, while Hoffman firmly disagrees and says, "Justice is all you need." In Ginsberg's opinion, "awareness is all you need ... love stems from awareness." Coyote rebuts the idea, as proposed in 1987 ideology, that the 1960s were merely "a drug-induced euphoria ... a failure", and he adds: "The times they are changing. They really are."

== Release and reception ==
It Was Twenty Years Ago Today was broadcast on the ITV network in Britain on 1 June 1987. It was one of many television and radio programs honouring the twentieth anniversary of the release of Sgt. Pepper, although the actual release date in 1967 had been brought forward to late May. In addition to the publication of Taylor's book, the album was issued on compact disc for the first time and peaked at number 3 on the UK Albums Chart. In a contemporary interview, Taylor said: "I haven't seen anything like this in a number of years. I have a feeling of dread that we have Beatlemania back again." 3 June 1987 was its North American premiere date when it aired on the Canadian Broadcasting Corporation (CBC). The documentary was shown by PBS in the US on 11 November.

The documentary received highly favourable reviews. Richard Harrington of The Washington Post described it as "much more than musical nostalgia or a Beatles memorial. It's a thoughtful, expansive look back at the times, the dreams, the rude realities and the untarnished aspirations of many of its key players." He said that Harrison offered the most insightful comments on the times, and added: "One comes away from 'It Was 20 Years Ago Today' with a remembrance of the invitations that defined the era. Invitations not just to 'feed your head' or 'turn on, tune in, drop out,' but to participate in a new community, to explore changes and exchanges, to experiment, to join in a 'tide of playfulness.'" Writing in The New York Times, John Corry welcomed the two former Beatles' insights, although he rued the presence of Leary, Hoffman and Fonda, and that the frequent interview comments limited the amount of music that was heard. Corry also questioned the filmmakers' contention that the Beatles were solely responsible for the cultural changes of 1967 and said that "The paradox in the documentary is that Mr. McCartney and Mr. Harrison ... claim a good deal less than their apostles."

It was not universally admired. An unsympathetic review came from the Toronto Star‘s television critic Jonathan Gross, "Ironically that wry mantra—'If you can remember the '60s, then you weren't really there'—provides both the best moment in It Was Twenty Years Ago Today and its sharpest criticism. The Granada Television documentary, imported by CBC to commemorate the anniversary of the release of The Beatles' Sgt. Pepper's Lonely Hearts Club Band, unfortunately loses more perspective than it creates as it blindly slashes through the enchanted forest that was the '60s." He would go on and berate the counter culture veteran interviewees as out of touch with contemporary society and looking defeated. He did not like nor believe that the central theme, that Sgt. Pepper, "was not just an influential record, but ground-zero for the socio-political youthquakes of 1967… Suffice to say the links are tenuous."

Hoffman said that Sheppard's film was "simply brilliant" and "the only thing I'm ever going to recommend to anybody about the 60s". When asked in a Q magazine interview in late 1987 why he had been the only person to unequivocally agree with the sentiments of "All You Need Is Love", Harrison replied: "They all said All You Need Is Love but you also need such-and-such else. But … love is complete knowledge. If we all had total knowledge, then we would have complete love and, on that basis, everything is taken care of. It's a law of nature."
