= 1967 Basel Picasso paintings purchase referendum =

Two Brothers (1905); one of the subjects of the referendum, which remain on display in the Kunstmuseum Basel

In the 1967 Basel Picasso paintings purchase referendum, the people of Basel, Switzerland, voted for the purchase of two paintings by Pablo Picasso, Les deux frères (1906) and Arlequin assis (1923). The referendum took place on 17 December 1967, and the "yes" campaign was supported by the youth of Basel and the local football club FC Basel, among others. Picasso was astonished by the fact that people would vote in favor to buy his art in a majority vote, and invited Franz Meyer, the director of the Kunstmuseum Basel, to see him at his atelier in Mougins, where he presented the "Youth of Basel" with four more of his works.

== Background ==
Artist Pablo Picasso finished the paintings Two Brothers in 1905 and Seated Harlequin in 1923. The Swiss industrialist Rudolf Staechelin came to acquire both, in 1907 and 1924. Following the Basel-based entrepreneur's death in 1947, his foundation loaned the two paintings to the Kunstmuseum Basel, whereupon they became a treasured part of the collection. After 20 years in the Basel collection, the museum assumed the loan would be permanent.

But the fate of the paintings became uncertain following the 1967 Nicosia Britannia disaster, in which a Globe-Air flight crashed, killing 126 and leading to the Basel charter airline's bankruptcy. Peter Staechelin, a son of the industrialist, officer of his foundation, and principal shareholder of Globe-Air, sought to sell paintings to repay his creditors. The Staechelin Foundation chose to sell works by Claude Monet, Paul Cézanne, and Alfred Sisley as well as the La Berceuse by Vincent Van Gogh, all of which were hanging on loan in the Basel Kunstmuseum. An unidentified American bidder offered 11 million francs for Staechelin's two Picassos (US$2.56 million). After a first successful sale was reported, opposition to a further sell-out arose from influential personalities of Basel. Franz Meyer and Peter Staechelin agreed that the two Picassos would be sold to the city of Basel for the sum of 8.4 million Swiss Francs, which was enough to pay for Staehelin's debts.

== Referendum ==
The Executive Council of Basel-Stadt decided to grant six million for the purchase of the Picassos and the Grand Council of Basel-Stadt approved the loan with four opposing votes on 12 October 1967. The remaining 2.4 million was to be paid by the public. To collect the amount needed, the cultural society of the city organized so called "Beggars Feasts", daughters of good-standing families cleaned shoes or offered meals and students sold popcorn during school breaks. The amount of money collected was displayed above the entrance of the Kunstmuseum Basel, which reserved a prominent room, where only the two Picassos in question together with Hans Holbein the Younger's portrait of his wife and their two children were presented, to show the current mood of the museum. A committee led by Albert Lauper, who had lost money with the liquidation of Globe Air, opposed the loan and achieved enough votes for a referendum about the credit for the purchase. The committee argued that the municipality should be concerned about affordable housing and social welfare instead of purchasing paintings. A vigorous campaign ensued during which the slogans "I like Pablo" or "All you need is Pablo" were proclaimed in manifestations throughout the city. "All you need is Pablo" was chosen in reference to the well-known Beatles song "All You Need Is Love", which was released the same year. The local football club FC Basel hung posters supporting the "yes campaign" and the city's public transport operator offered an option to donate a part of ticket fares for the purchase of the Picassos while its director appealed to the spirit of Johann Rudolf Wettstein who in 1661 also decided to support the culture of Basel. The students of the high schools in Basel collected 2,000 signatures among themselves in a show of solidarity with the yes campaign and the cantons of Basel-Land and St.Gallen both voluntarily contributed to the purchase. Together with further donations by the pharmaceutical elite of Basel, 2.5 million was raised which was more than initially needed.

Proponents held nightly meetings to strategize their outreach to Basel's poorer citizens, who may be more inclined to allocate funds for other services. Basel artists donated paintings and pottery for sale at the Beggar's Festival, a street fair.

Opponents argued that the funds were better appropriated towards schools and hospitals. Many former stockholders and employees of the Basel-based, bankrupted Globe-Air resented the idea of public bailout for the paintings, considering their losses from the affair.

The referendum, which took place on 17 December 1967, passed 32,118 to 27,190. The two paintings remained in the Kunstmuseum Basel. As part of the sale, the city required the Staechelin Foundation to keep 12 of the museum's highest prized works on loan for 15 years at a minimum.

== Reactions ==
The Poet, 1912

Having observed the elections, Pablo Picasso was overwhelmed by the result and invited Franz Meyer to visit him in his Mougins atelier in the south of France. There he would present to the "Youth of Basel" the works Man, Woman and Child (1906) along with the two major later works Venus and Amor and The Couple (both from 1967). He also presented them with a sketch of the renowned Les Demoiselles d'Avignon (1907). Finally, Maja Sacher-Stehlin donated Picasso's cubist work The Poet (1912) in support of the cultural spirit in the city. In total, seven Picasso artworks became a part of the Kunstmuseum Basel in 1967.

== Legacy ==
The referendum had been observed internationally, and the outcome was not expected by journalists who had prepared headlines for a victory of the "no campaign". In 2018, the Kunstmuseum Basel organized an exhibition to celebrate the 50th anniversary of the acquisitions and the events surrounding the referendum.
