= Global Beatles Day =

Annual holiday occurring 25 June celebrating the Beatles

- Promotional poster for Global Beatles Day
- Type: Secular
- Date: 25 June
- Next time: 25 June 2027
- Frequency: Annual
- First time: 2009
- Related to: The Beatles

Global Beatles Day (also known as World Beatles Day) is an annual holiday held on 25 June each year to commemorate the legacy and cultural impact of the English rock band the Beatles. The date, 25 June, was chosen to commemorate the date that the Beatles participated in the BBC show Our World in 1967, performing "All You Need Is Love" broadcast to an international audience. The holiday was created and first celebrated in 2009 by Faith Cohen, who called it "a thank you or love letter" to the band.

== Origins ==
Global Beatles Day was established in 2009 by Faith Cohen, an American fan from Indianapolis, as a grassroots initiative through social media. The date was selected to mark the anniversary of the Beatles' 1967 performance of "All You Need Is Love", which was broadcast live via satellite as part of the BBC's Our World program. The performance reached an estimated 400 million viewers in over 20 countries and is regarded as a defining moment of the 1960s counterculture. According to Cohen, the day was not conceived for commercial purposes, but rather to serve as "a thank you or love letter" to the Beatles.

The observance is intended to honor both the artistic achievements and cultural impact of the Beatles, particularly their messages of peace, love, and global unity. Global Beatles Day promotes these values by encouraging fans to reflect on the band's influence and share their appreciation through music, conversation, and community engagement.

== Celebration ==
There is no official or standardised way to observe Global Beatles Day. Common forms of celebration include listening to or performing Beatles songs, watching related films or documentaries, and sharing content on social media. Fans are often encouraged to circulate videos of the Beatles' performances—especially their "All You Need Is Love" broadcast—on the anniversary date. Some also use the day to host gatherings or educational events focused on the band's music and cultural influence.

Cuba used the occasion to put on a Beatles film festival in 2018. Online celebrations have included an Amazon tie-in, a joint live concert on Bigo Live, creations and collections of Beatles-themed comic strips, and use of the social media hashtag #GlobalBeatlesDay.

In 2026, Faith received a letter from Apple Corps CEO, Tom Greene, officially acknowledging the holiday by uploading the music video of "All You Need Is Love" on The Beatles' YouTube channel for the first time
