= 1967 Nicosia Globe Air Bristol Britannia crash =

1967 aviation accident

Coordinates: 35°06′30″N 33°17′14″E

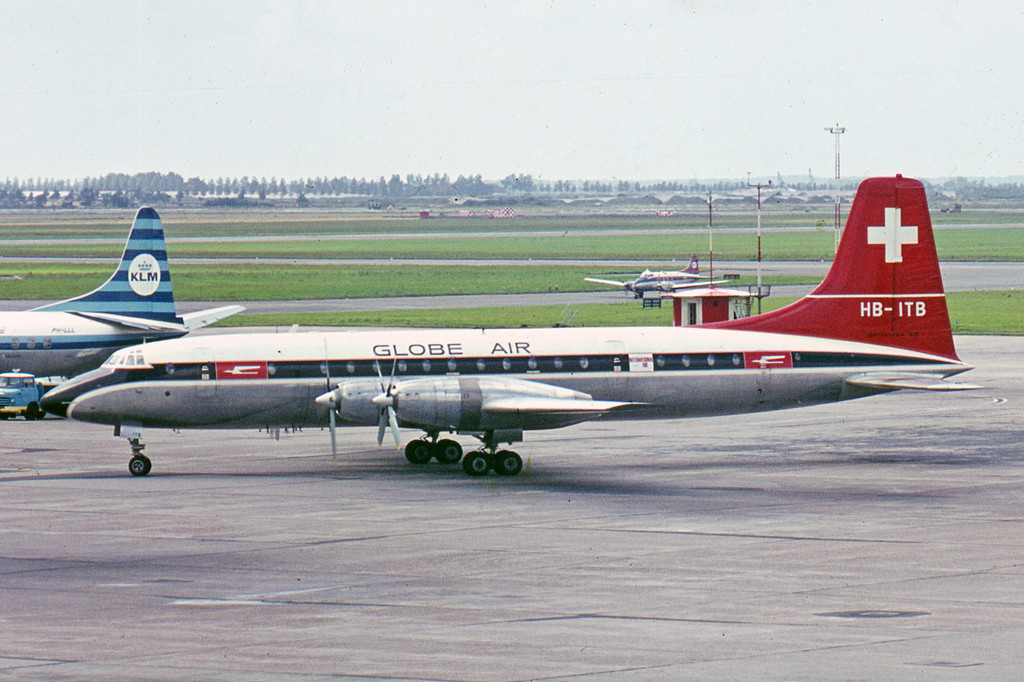
- HB-ITB, the aircraft involved in the accident, seen here at Schiphol Airport in 1965

Accident
- Date: 20 April 1967
- Summary: Controlled flight into terrain (CFIT)
- Site: 3.5 km south of Nicosia Airport

Aircraft
- Aircraft type: Bristol Britannia 313
- Operator: Globe Air
- Registration: HB-ITB
- Flight origin: Don Mueang International Airport, Bangkok
- 1st stopover: Colombo International Airport
- 2nd stopover: Chhatrapati Shivaji International Airport (Bombay-Santa Cruz Airport), Mumbai, India
- 3rd stopover: Cairo International Airport diverted to Nicosia International Airport
- Destination: Basel International Airport, Basel, Switzerland
- Occupants: 130
- Passengers: 120
- Crew: 10
- Fatalities: 126
- Injuries: 3
- Survivors: 4

On 20 April 1967, a Bristol Britannia aircraft of the Swiss airline Globe Air flew into the ground 3.5 kilometres (2.2 mi) south of Nicosia Airport, in Cyprus killing 126 of the 130 passengers and crew on board. This accident is currently the deadliest aviation accident to occur in Cyprus.

== Accident ==
The Britannia was operating a charter flight bringing tourists from Bangkok in Thailand to Basel in Switzerland with stopovers in Colombo, Bombay, and Cairo. The flight stopped at Colombo in Sri Lanka and then Bombay in India with the next stop due to be Cairo. The crew diverted the flight to Nicosia due to bad weather at Cairo. The aircraft was on the third attempt to land on Runway 32 in a violent thunderstorm when it flew into a hill near the village of Lakatamia and burst into flames.

At the time of the crash, both pilots had exceeded their authorized duty time by three hours. The flight's first officer had less than 50 hours flying time in Britannia aircraft.

Two German (Christa Blümel and Peter Femfert) and two Swiss (Verena Gysin and Nicolas Pulver) passengers survived; three of them were seriously injured and were treated at a United Nations field hospital near Nicosia, the fourth, Nicolas Pulver, was reported to be unhurt.

== Legacy ==
The crash culminated in Globe Air's bankruptcy and the sale of paintings that led to the 1967 Basel Picasso paintings purchase referendum.
