= Solothurn Madonna =

Painting by Hans Holbein the Younger

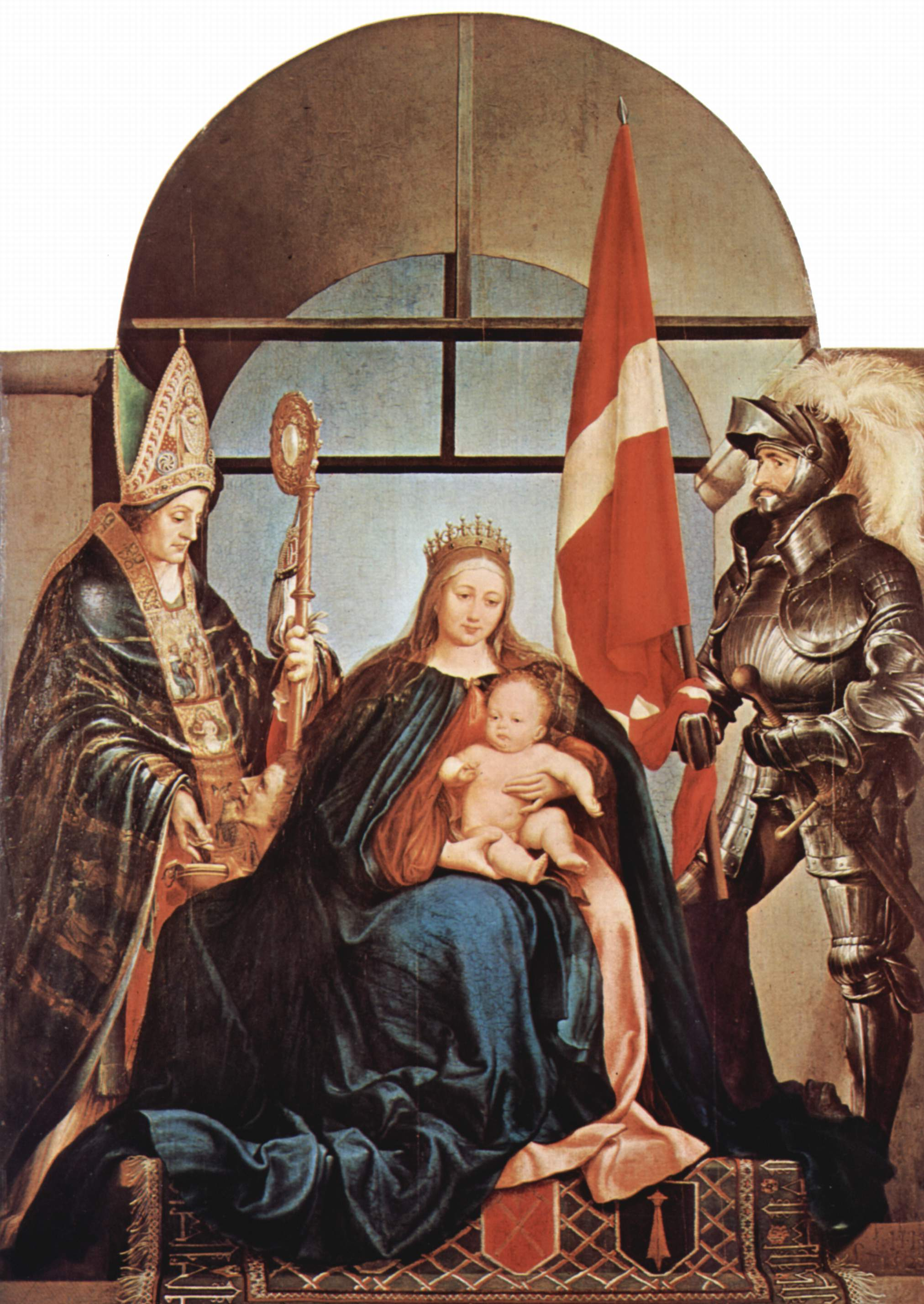
- Artist: Hans Holbein the Younger
- Year: 1522
- Medium: Oil on limewood
- Dimensions: 143,5 cm × 104,9 cm (565 in × 413 in)
- Location: Kunstmuseum Solothurn, Solothurn

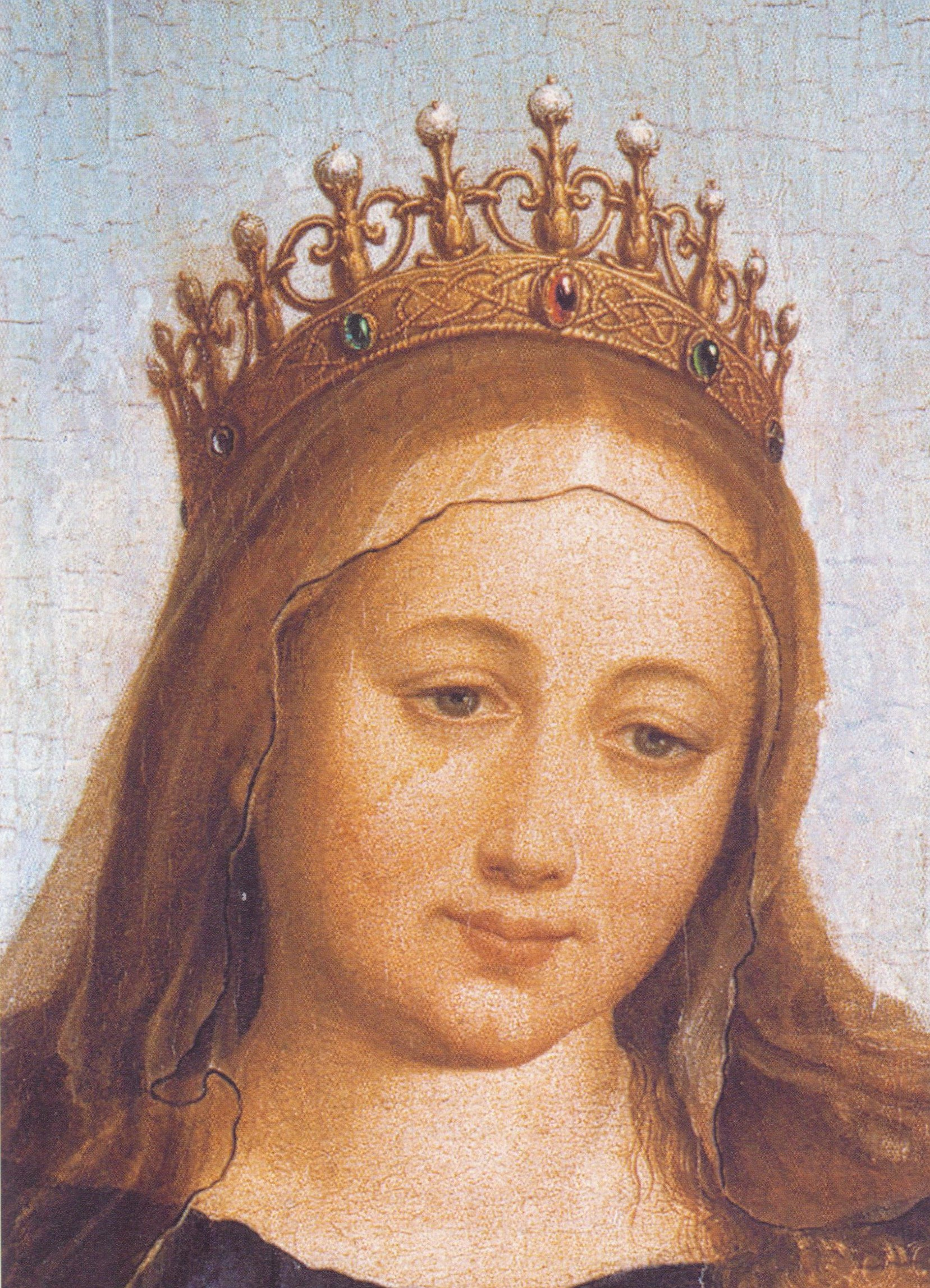
Detail of the Madonna, between the first restoration of 1866 and the second of 1971

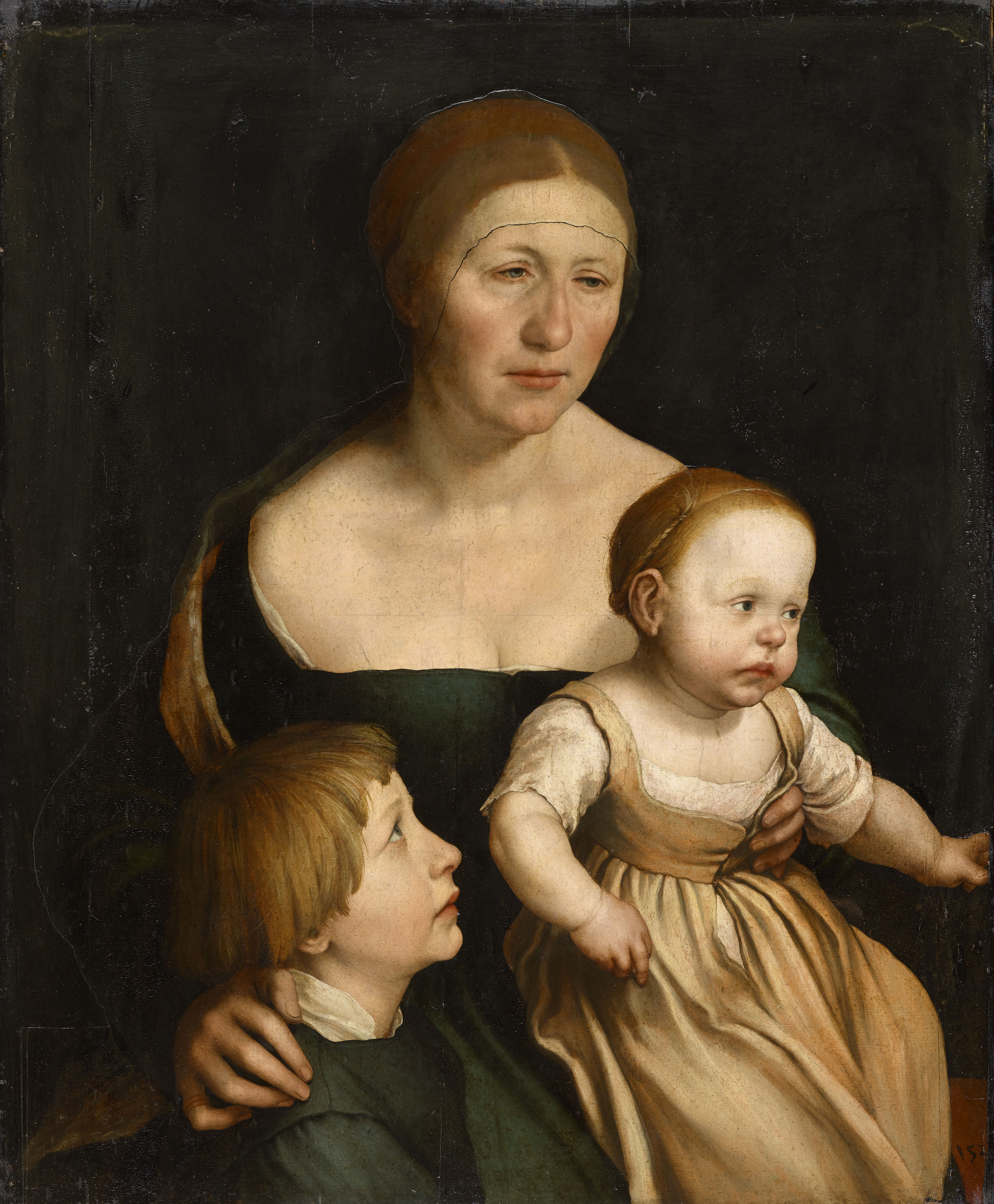
Elisabeth and her children Philipp and Katharina, a 1528 painting by Holbein

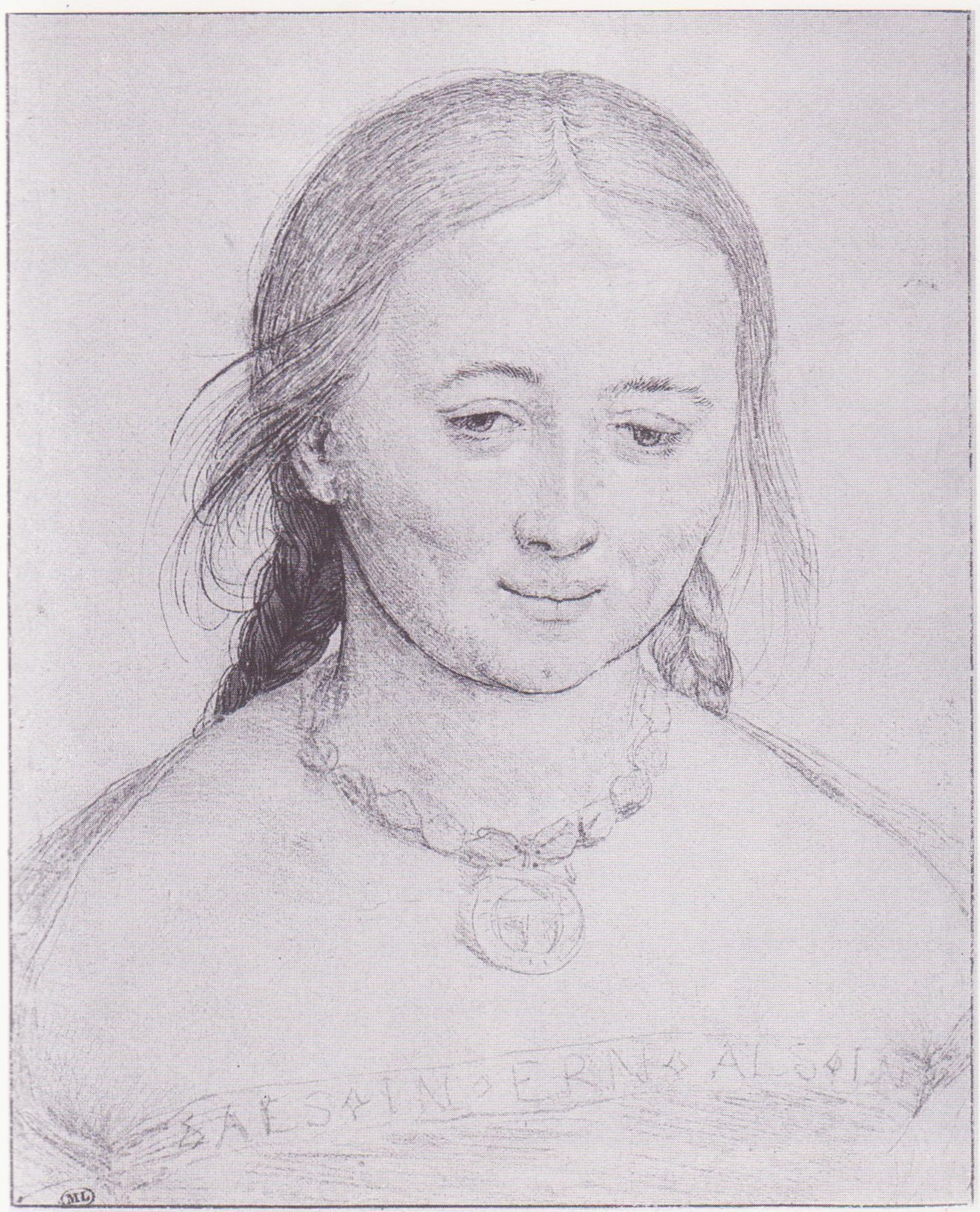
Holbein's drawing of a young woman, 1520–1522, probably a model for the Solothurn Madonna

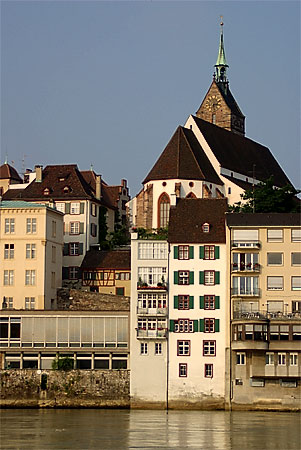
The Martinskirche in Basel, probably the original home of the Solothurn Madonna

The Solothurn Madonna is an oil-on-panel painting created in 1522 by the German-Swiss artist Hans Holbein the Younger in Basel. The painting depicts the Virgin Mary and Christ enthroned, flanked by Martin of Tours, shown as a bishop giving alms to a beggar, and Ursus of Solothurn, depicted as a soldier in armour. Notably, Holbein used his wife, Elsbeth, as the model for the Madonna, and the baby is believed to have been modelled after Holbein and Elsbeth's infant son Philipp.

The church that originally commissioned the Solothurn Madonna is unknown, but it reappeared in 1864 in a state of disrepair at the Allerheiligenkapelle in the Grenchen district of Solothurn. The town of Solothurn has owned the painting since 1879, and it has been named after the town since the late 19th century. Currently, it is housed at the Solothurn Art Museum. After the Darmstadt Madonna, the Solothurn Madonna is the second largest surviving Madonna by Hans Holbein the Younger.

== See also ==
- List of paintings by Hans Holbein the Younger

== Bibliography (in German) ==
- Jacob Amiet: Hans Holbein's Madonna von Solothurn Und der Stifter Nicolaus Conrad, Solothurn, 1879. Reprint: Bibliolife, LaVergne, 2011.
- Oskar Bätschmann, Pascal Griener: Hans Holbein d.J. – Die Solothurner Madonna. Eine Sacra Conversazione im Norden, Basel, 1998. ISBN 3-7965-1050-7
- Jochen Sander: Hans Holbein d. J. und die niederländische Kunst, am Beispiel der "Solothurner Madonna" in: Zeitschrift für Schweizerische Archäologie und Kunstgeschichte 55 (1998), S. 123–130.
