= Kunstmuseum Solothurn =

Museum in Solothurn, Switzerland

Coordinates: 47°12′37″N 7°32′15″E

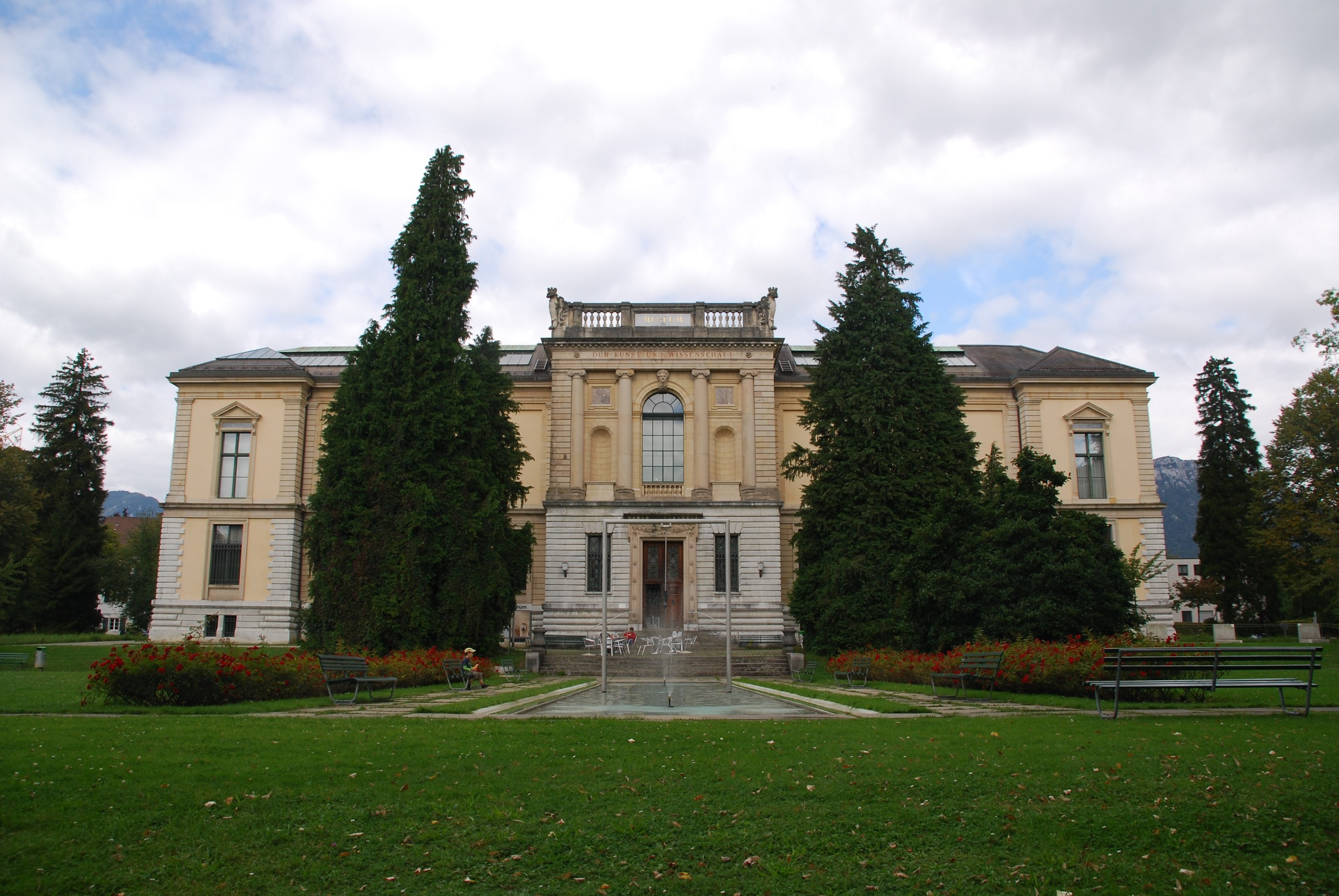
Outside view of the Kunstmuseum Solothurn

The Kunstmuseum Solothurn or Art Museum Solothurn is an art museum in the Swiss town Solothurn.

== History ==
The museum opened in 1902. The early exposition showed the town's collections of arts, historical artifacts and natural historical objects. Around 1980, the natural history collection was moved to the Naturmuseum Solothurn, the museumsbuilding was converted and since then exhibits art from various collections along with short-period exhibitions of contemporary art.

== Collection ==
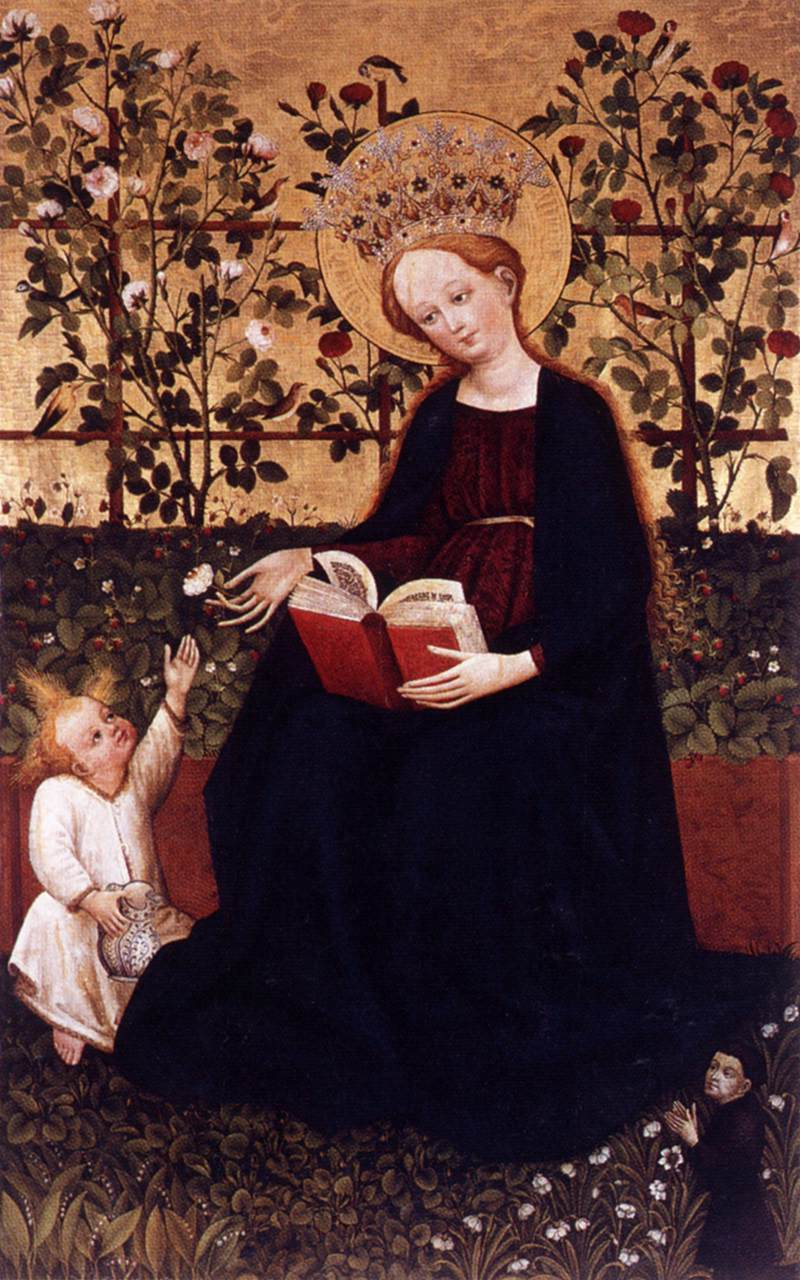
Madonna of the Strawberries by an unknown German master, ca. 1425

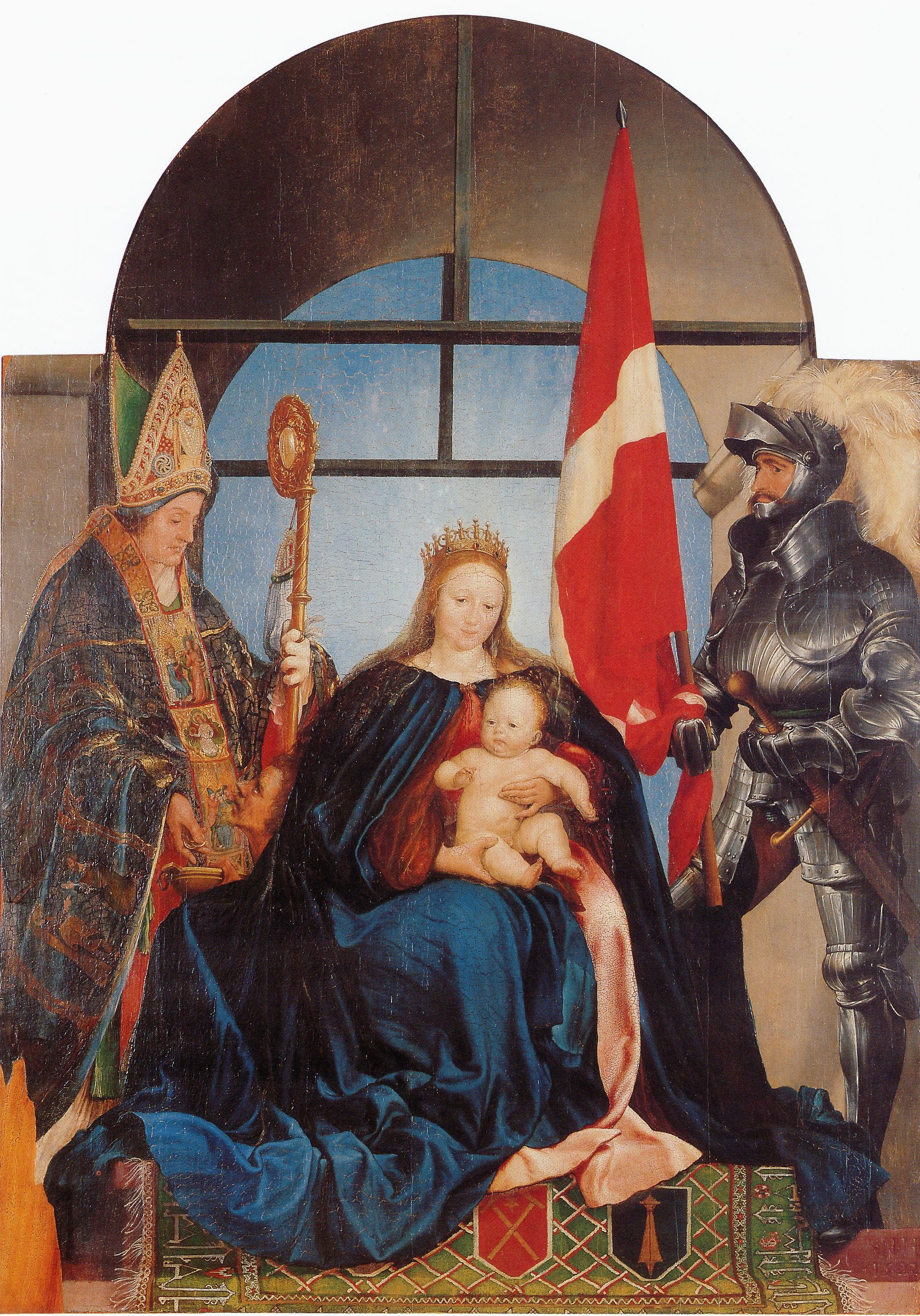
Solothurn Madonna, by Hans Holbein the Younger, 1522

The collection has five divisions: old masters, Swiss landscapes from the 18th until the 20th century, Swiss contemporary art, and two separate collections from gifts from collectors; the Dûbi-Müller and Josef-Müller collection, focused on international art from the late 19th and early 20th century, and a collection of works by Max Gubler.

Highlights of the collection of old masters include a "Madonna of the Strawberries" from 1425, the Solothurner Madonna by Hans Holbein the Younger, and works by Frans Snyders and Jusepe de Ribera. Swiss masters included in the landscape collection are Caspar Wolf, Alexandre Calame, Félix Vallotton, Giovanni Giacometti and local artist Otto Frölicher. Modern Swiss artists include Jean Tinguely, Méret Oppenheim and Bernhard Luginbühl. The contemporary collection includes works by Daniel Spoerri, Dieter Roth, Markus Raetz, Roman Signer, Silvie Defraoui, René Zäch, Albrecht Schnider, Uwe Wittwer, Felix Stephan Huber, Ian Anüll, Peter Wüthrich, Ingo Giezendanner, Robert Estermann.

The double collection of the sisters Müller contains paintings by Vincent van Gogh, Gustav Klimt, Paul Cézanne, Henri Matisse, Edgar Degas, Auguste Renoir, Fernand Léger, and Swiss painter Ferdinand Hodler.

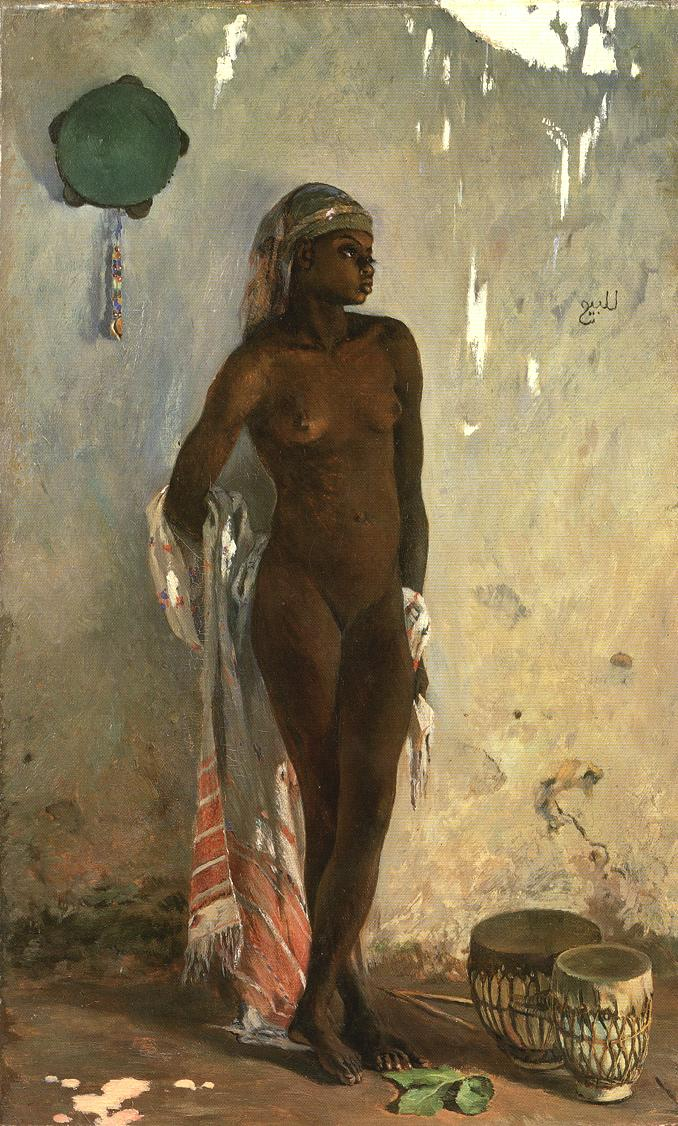
Nude slave with tambourin by Frank Buchser, 1862

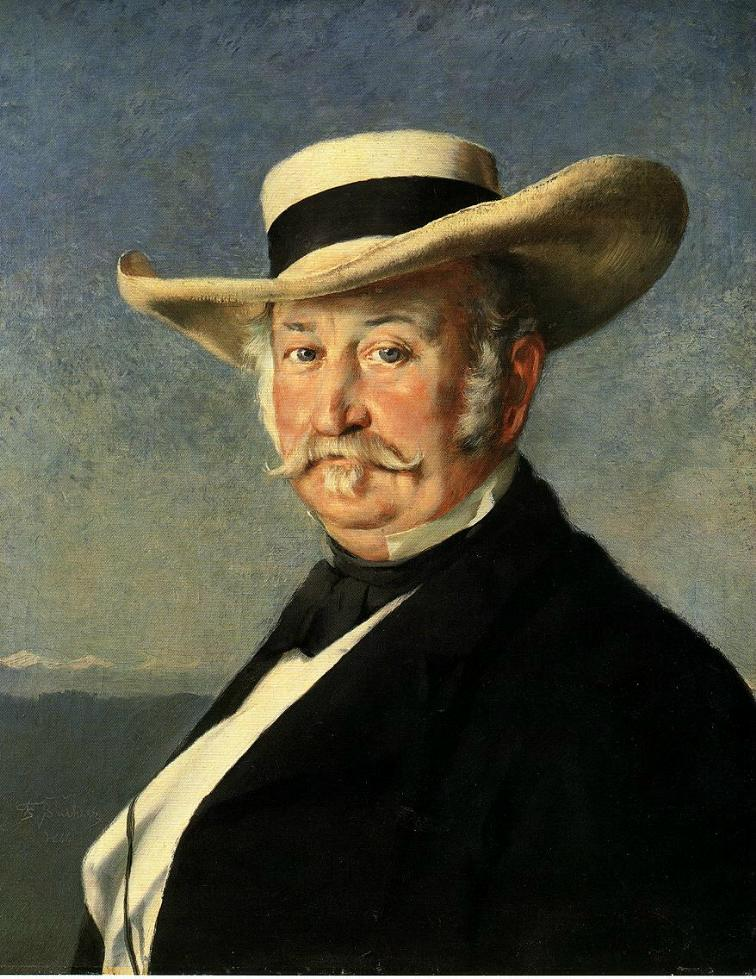
Portrait of John Sutter by Frank Buchser, 1866

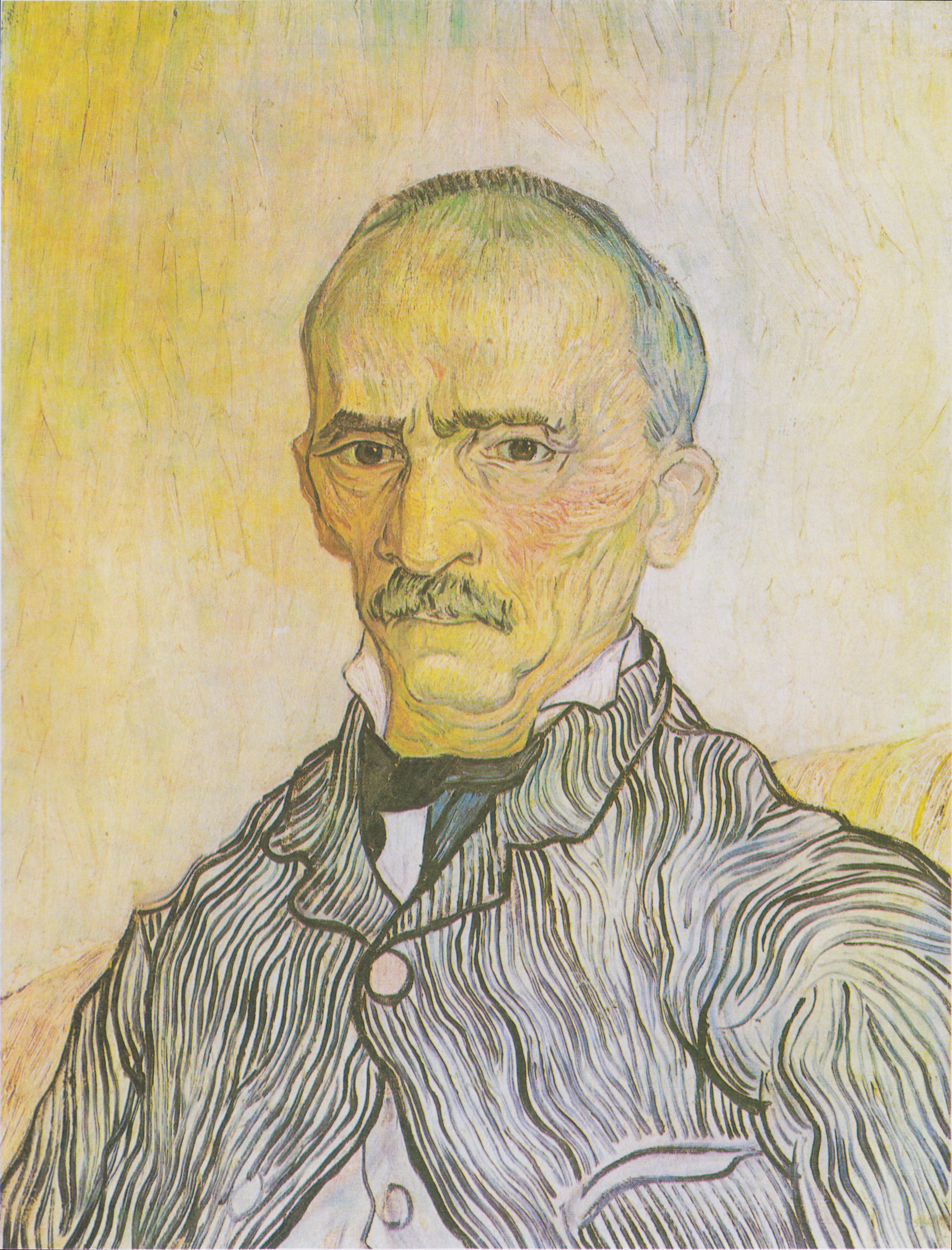
Portrait of the superintendent Trabuc in the Hospital Saint-Paul by Vincent van Gogh, 1889

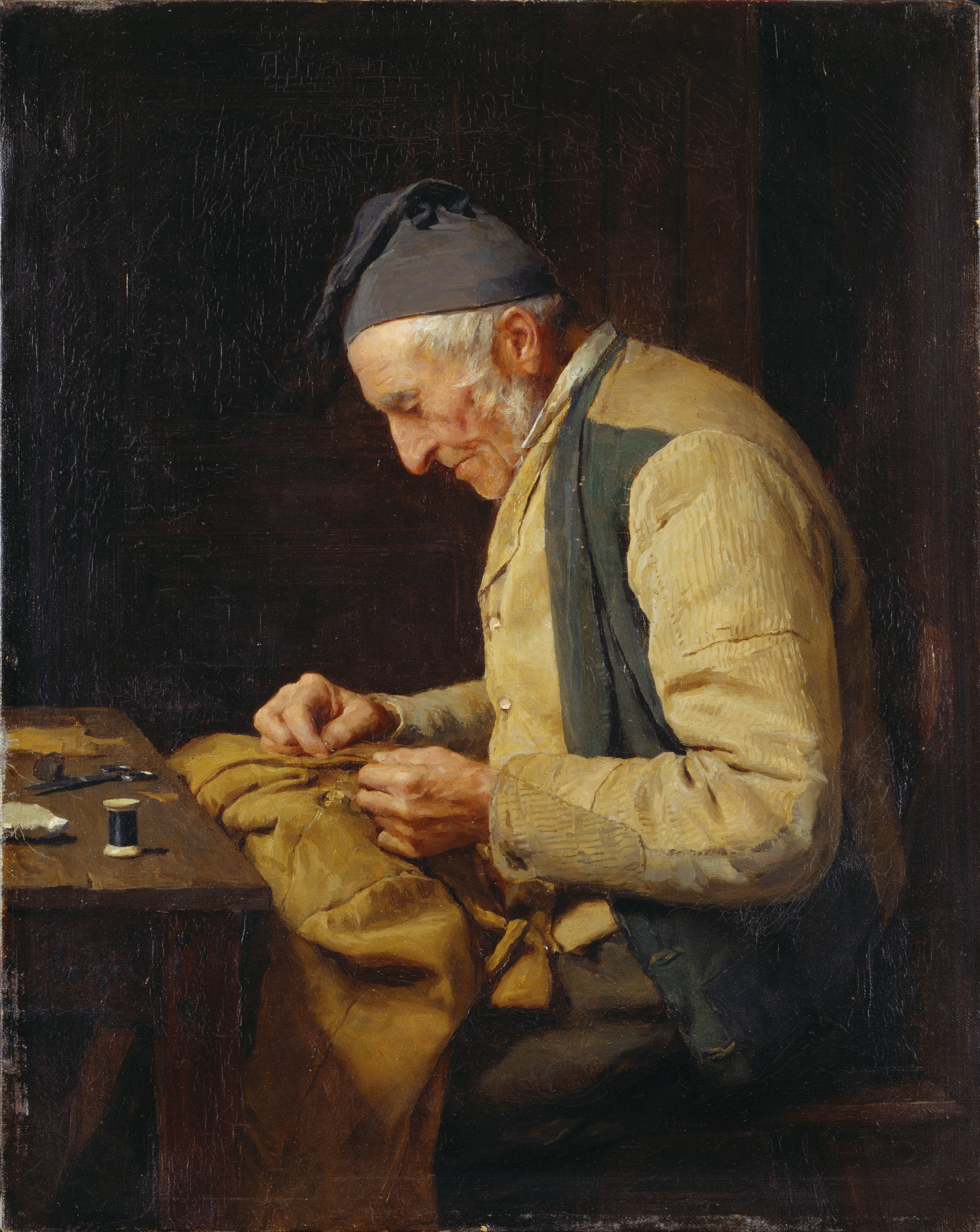
The village tailor by Albert Anker, 1894

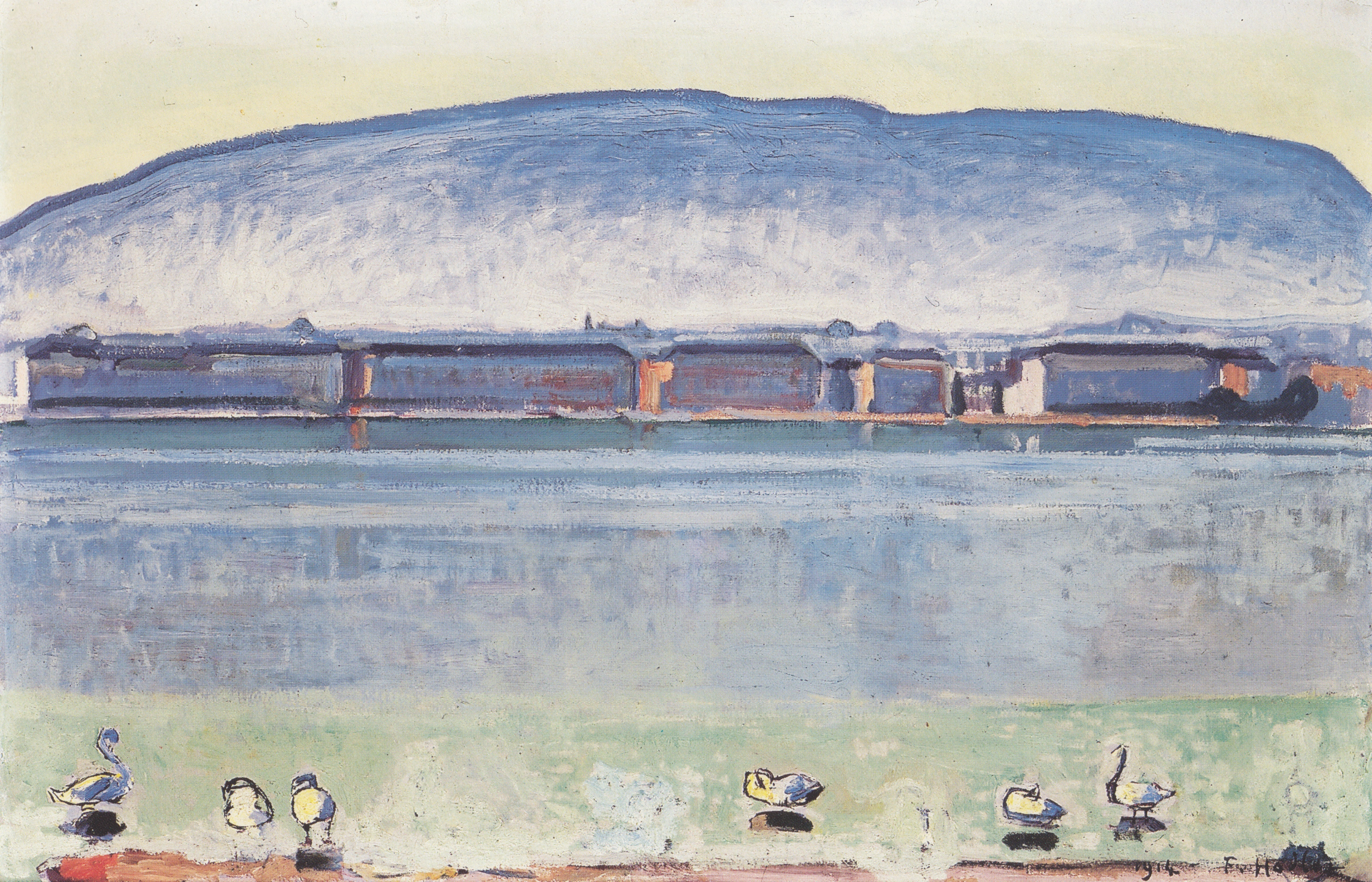
Lake Geneva with six swans by Ferdinand Hodler, 1914

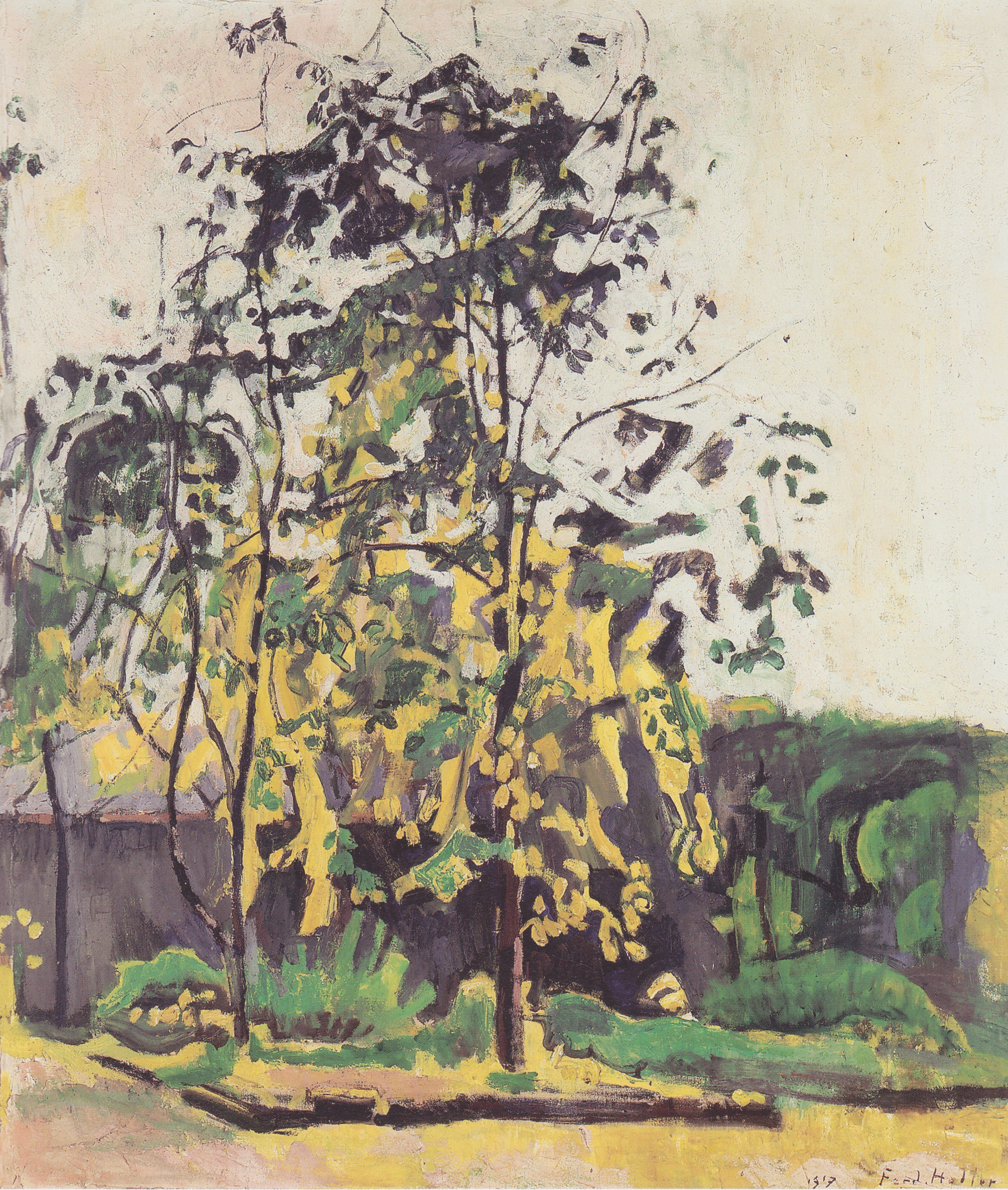
Trees in the garden of the studio by Ferdinand Hodler, 1917

== See also ==
- List of museums in Switzerland
