= Uwe Wittwer =

Swiss artist (born 1954)

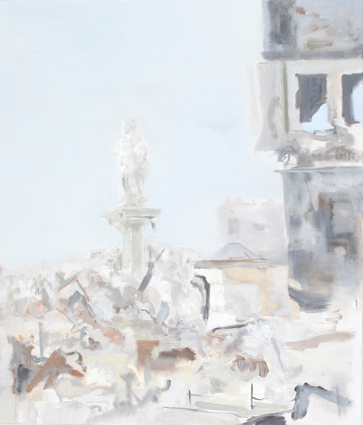
Uwe Wittwer. Ruin, 2005, oil on canvas, 70 x 60 cm

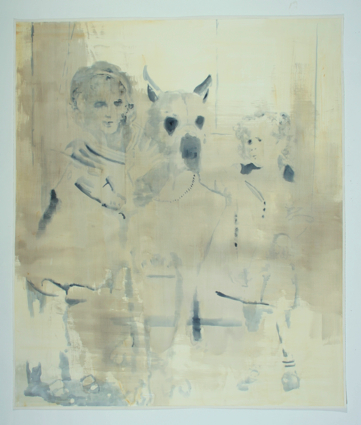
Uwe Wittwer. Double Portrait with Dog, 2007, watercolour, 180 x 150 cm

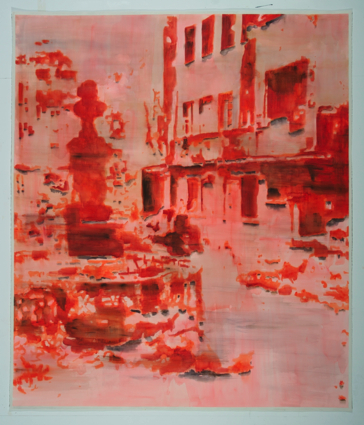
Uwe Wittwer. Ruin, 2007, watercolour, 180 x 150 cm

Uwe Wittwer (born 1954) is a Swiss artist. He lives and works in Zürich, Switzerland. The media he uses include watercolor, oil painting, inkjet prints and video.

== Life and work ==
Uwe Wittwer is an autodidact. Born 1954 in Zurich where he went to school, he originally trained as a social worker (Bern, 1974–1977). In 1979 he rented his first studio. His early works were colourful abstract expressive oil paintings. The change towards figurative painting took place during the mid 80s. His first solo exhibition was at Galerie Walcheturm, Zurich in 1983. In 1989 he spent time in London on a studio grant (Binz 39 Foundation, Zurich). In 1994 studied in Paris for a year, financed by a grant by the Canton Zurich. In the same year, he received the Swiss federal scholarship for the arts. 1998 solo exhibition at Helmhaus Zurich, the first time his digitally edited photographs were shown. Since then, digitally manipulated images are part of his work. He works with images downloaded from the internet.

'Uwe Wittwer is a painter with a restricted, a ritualised vocabulary'; his motifs consist of four main subjects: landscapes, cities, still lifes and portraits, - later condensed into three main themes: idyll, referential work and the theme of violence.

The works of reference encompass interiors and still lifes of Dutch Masters, such as Pieter de Hooch or Willem Kalf and works by French and British masters like Jean Siméon Chardin, Nicolas Poussin, Thomas Gainsborough. Another recurring image is that of Charon in his boat, based on Arnold Böcklin's Isle of the Dead. The theme of violence covers subjects like 'free time' of American soldiers in the Vietnam War, ruins of bombed out cities or scorched family homes.

Uwe Wittwer's work is underlined by 'the question of what a picture is' and the question how memory affects images.

Uwe Wittwer was guest tutor at the Witten/Herdecke University, Germany (1998–2000) and at the Zeppelin University, Friedrichshafen, Germany (2010)

In 2008 he was voted into The 50 most important artists of Switzerland List by Bilanz Magazine.

In 2013 two of his works were added to the collection of the Metropolitan Museum of Art, New York.

== Exhibitions ==
Solo exhibitions (a selection) Kunsthalle Bern, CH (1991); Museum Schloss Morsbroich, Kunstverein Leverkusen, GER (1997); Helmhaus Zurich, CH (1998); University Art Gallery, Pittsburgh PA, USA (2000); Kunstmuseum Solothurn, CH (2005); Ludwig Forum für Internationale Kunst, Aachen, GER (2005); Haunch of Venison, Zurich (2007); Cohan and Leslie, New York (2008); Nolan Judin, Berlin (2009); Fred Jahn, Munich (2009); Haunch of Venison, London (2009); Lullin + Ferrari, Zurich (2010); Haunch of Venison, London; Nolan Judin, Berlin (2011); Haunch of Venison, London (2011); Void, Derry (2012), SMAC Gallery, Cape Town (2012), Abbot Hall Art Gallery, Kendal (2013); Nolan Judin, Berlin (2013), Lullin + Ferrari, Zurich (2013); Parafin, London (2015), Judin Gallery, Berlin (2016), Lullin + Ferrari Gallery, Zurich (2017), Judin Gallery, Berlin (2018), Peter Kilchmann Gallery, Zurich (2019), Kunsthaus Grenchen, Grenchen (2019)

Group exhibitions (a selection) Tatort London, Galerie Schübbe, Düsseldorf, GER (1996); Die Schärfe der Unschärfe, Kunstmuseum Solothurn (1998); Swiss Contemporary Art, Sungkok Art Museum, Seoul (1998); Schafft Land!, Stadtmuseum Siegburg, GER (2000); L'Imagine ritrovata Museo cantonale d'Arte, Lugano, CH (2002); Big is beautiful Musée d'art et d'histoire de la Ville de Neuchâtel, CH (2002); Flower Myth - van Gogh to Jeff Koons, Fondation Beyeler, Basel, CH (2005); Reprocessing Reality, P.S.1 MoMA, New York (2006); Fade Away and Radiate, Cohan and Leslie Gallery, New York (2007); Mythologies, Haunch of Venison Burlington Gardens, London (2009); Courtauld Institute of Art, London (2010); Watercolour, Tate Britain, London (2011); Haunch of Venison, Eastcastle Street, London (2012); Das Doppelte Bild, Kunstmuseum Solothurn (2013), Abraham. Ovid. Das Andere, with Slawomir Elsner, at Lullin + Ferrari, Zurich (2015); Die Augen der Bilder – Porträts von Fragonard bis Dumas, Museum Langmatt, Baden (2017); Peter Kilchmann Gallery, Zurich (2018); Journeys with ‘The Waste Land’, Herbert Art Gallery, Coventry (2018); No use-by date, Museum of Fine Arts Bern, Bern (2019)
