= Portrait of the Artist's Family (Holbein) =

Portrait by Hans Holbein the Younger

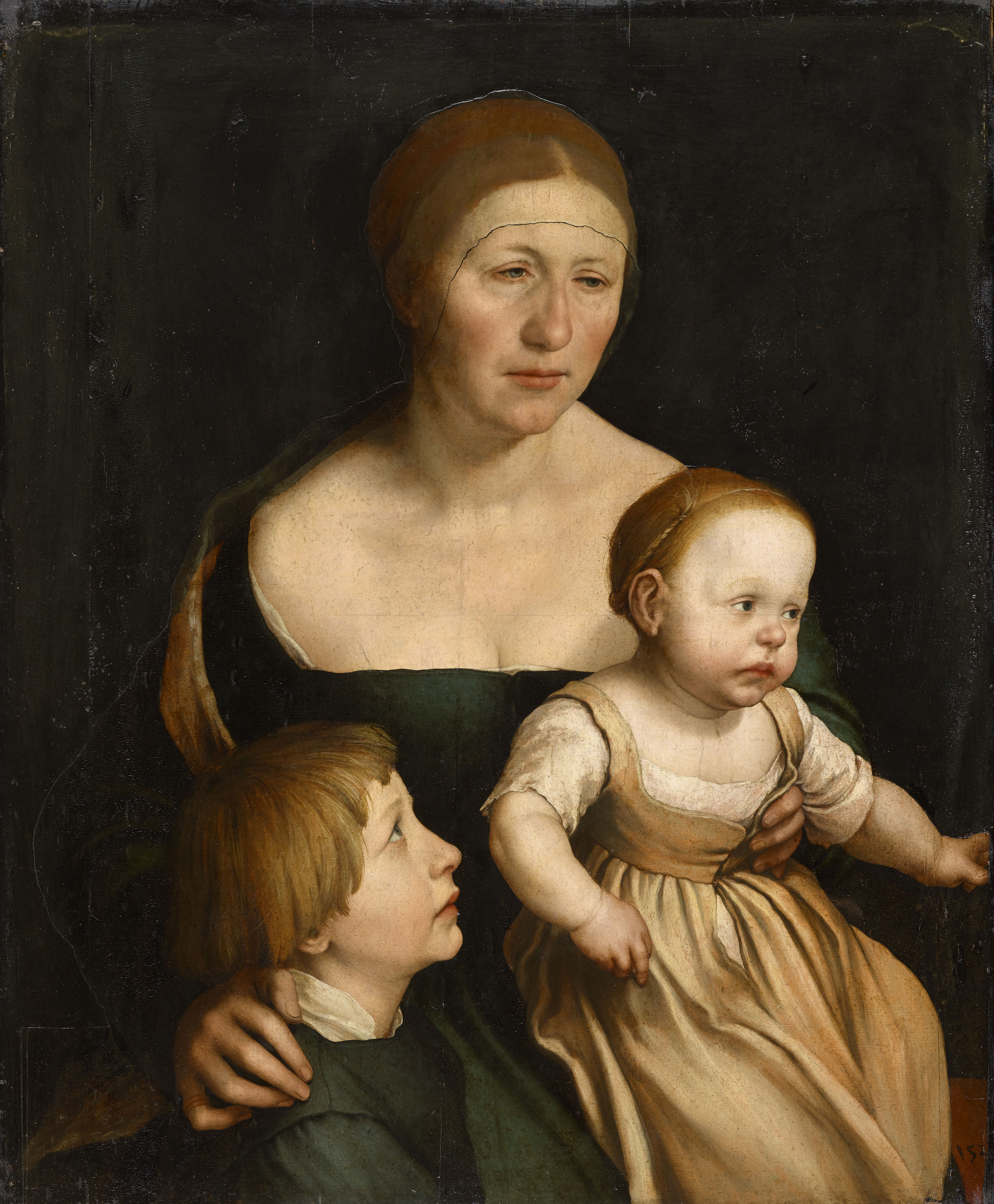
- Portrait of the Artist's Family
- Artist: Hans Holbein the Younger
- Year: 1528–1529
- Medium: mixed technique on paper, cut out along the figure contours and mounted on lime wood
- Dimensions: 79.4 cm × 64.7 cm (31.3 in × 25.5 in)
- Location: Kunstmuseum Basel, Basel
- 47°33′15″N 7°35′39″E
- Accession: Inv. 325
- Website: kunstmuseumbasel.ch

Portrait of the Artist's Family is a portrait of the family of the painter Hans Holbein the Younger by the artist himself. It depicts Holbein's wife Elsbeth Binzenstock, their son Philipp and their daughter Katharina. Holbein painted it during his stay in Basel after his return from England. It was painted, between 1528 and 1529, on paper and glued on wood.

== Description ==
Elsbeth is seated on a bench with her daughter on her lap and her hand resting on her son's right shoulder. On the bench the numbers 152(…) can be seen in the lower right of the painting. The last number has been cut off the painting, as have the fingertips of the left hand of the girl. It is painted on three horizontally glued paper strips, with the two on the right being much broader than the one on the left. The boy's body and face are depicted in profile, the mother is painted from the front. While the mother doesn't seem to be gazing at anything specific, the boy is looking at something to the upper right. The mother's head is covered by a bonnet which is itself covered by a transparent veil with a fine black border. The right hand of the mother seems to be incomplete. The girl faces left and seems to grasp something with her left hand, which was probably on the piece cut away to the right.

=== Reception ===
The fact that Holbein's wife is depicted wearing a dark blue cloth with a rosa scarf, similar to that of the Virgin Mary in Holbein's Solothurn Madonna, prompted art historian Andreas Beyer to hypothesize that the painting might be a depiction of Holbein's own "Holy Family". The family is shown in modest clothing, which is in stark contrast to the riches Holbein brought back to Basel from England. In an infrared reflectography it was detected that the head of Philip was set in a lower position in the painting, and it is speculated that the portrait was originally planned as a larger composition which might have also included the artist himself painting his family. This theory is supported by a description of the portrait by an early owner, the painter Hans Asper, possibly at a time before the portrait was cut into its current version.

=== Influences ===
It is assumed that the painting was larger and that the third piece of paper on the right included another figure, either a depiction of Holbein himself or a woman resembling the Lais of Corinth. A drawing of the mother and the two children and a woman resembling Lais of Corinth can be seen in the Albertina in Vienna. The portrait seemed to have influenced the works of Hans Asper who, in a portrait of a woman in 1538, has transformed the two children into a cat and a dog. There exist several paintings inspired by the portrait. For example, in the Palais de Beaux Arts de Lille there is a pastiche with a religious connotation in which the family is joined by a woman inspired by Holbein's Lais of Corinth in the Albertina in Vienna.

== Ownership ==
For several years the painting was in the possession of Holbein's wife, Elsbeth Binzenstock. By 1543 it was in the possession of Hans Asper, a portrait painter from Zürich. Asper received several offers for the painting, including from Basilius Amerbach, but refused to sell it. Only after Asper's death did the portrait came into possession of Amerbach, who paid six crowns through the intermediation of the pharmacist Georg Clauser from Zürich. The portrait was described in the inventory of the Amerbach Cabinet in 1586, which was bought by the city of Basel in 1661. The painting is exhibited in the Kunstmuseum Basel.

== See also ==
- List of paintings by Hans Holbein the Younger
