= In His Own Write =

1964 book by John Lennon

- First edition
- Author: John Lennon
- Genre: Literary nonsense; surreal poetry
- Published: 23 March 1964 by Jonathan Cape
- Publication place: United Kingdom
- Pages: 80
- ISBN: 0-684-86807-5
- Followed by: A Spaniard in the Works

In His Own Write is a 1964 nonsense book by the English musician John Lennon. Lennon's first book, it consists of poems and short stories ranging from eight lines to three pages, as well as illustrations.

After Lennon showed journalist Michael Braun some of his writings and drawings, Braun in turn showed them to Tom Maschler of publisher Jonathan Cape, who signed Lennon in January 1964. He wrote most of the content expressly for the book, though some stories and poems had been published years earlier in the Liverpool music publication Mersey Beat. Lennon's writing style is informed by his interest in English writer Lewis Carroll, while humorists Spike Milligan and "Professor" Stanley Unwin inspired his sense of humour. His illustrations imitate the style of cartoonist James Thurber. Many of the book's pieces consist of private meanings and in-jokes, while also referencing Lennon's interest in physical abnormalities and expressing his anti-authority sentiments.

The book was both a critical and commercial success, selling around 300,000 copies in Britain. Reviewers praised it for its imaginative use of wordplay and favourably compared it to the later works of James Joyce, though Lennon was unfamiliar with him. Later commentators have discussed the book's prose in relation to Lennon's songwriting, both in how it differed from his contemporary writing and in how it anticipates his later work, heard in songs like "Lucy in the Sky with Diamonds" and "I Am the Walrus". Released amidst Beatlemania, its publication reinforced perceptions of Lennon as "the smart one" of the Beatles, and helped to further legitimise the place of pop musicians in society.

Since its release, the book has been translated into several languages. In 1965, Lennon released another book of nonsense literature, A Spaniard in the Works. He abandoned plans for a third collection and did not publish any other books in his lifetime. Victor Spinetti and Adrienne Kennedy adapted his two books into a one-act play, The Lennon Play: In His Own Write, produced by the National Theatre Company and first performed in June 1968 to mixed reviews.

== Background ==
=== Earliest influences ===
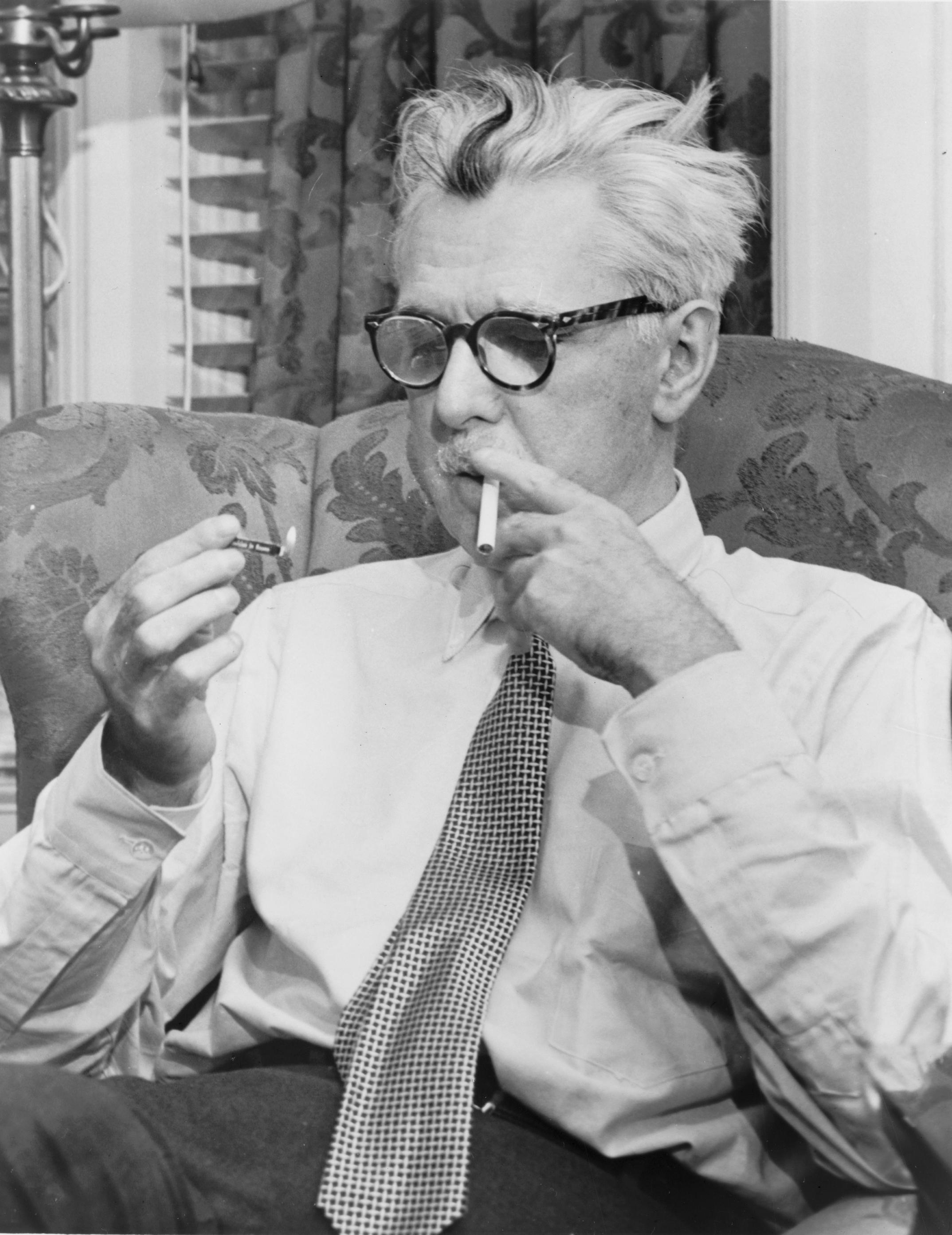
Left: The English writer Lewis Carroll, whose wordplay influenced John Lennon's writing style
Right: The American cartoonist James Thurber, whose cartoons Lennon began imitating when he was a teenager

John Lennon was artistic as a child, though unfocused on his schooling. He was mostly raised by his aunt Mimi Smith, an avid reader who helped shape the literary inclinations of both Lennon and his step-siblings. Answering a questionnaire in 1965 about which books made the largest impression on him before the age of eleven, he identified Lewis Carroll's nonsense works Alice's Adventures in Wonderland and Through the Looking-Glass, as well as Kenneth Grahame's children's book The Wind in the Willows. He added: "These books made a great impact and their influence will last for the rest of my life". (Note: Lennon chose Carroll for inclusion on the album cover of Sgt. Pepper's Lonely Hearts Club Band in 1967.) He reread Carroll's books at least once a year, being intrigued by the use of wordplay in pieces like "Jabberwocky". His childhood friend Pete Shotton remembered Lennon reciting the poem "at least a few hundred times", and that, "from a very early age, John's ultimate ambition was to one day 'write an Alice' himself". Lennon's first ever poem, "The Land of the Lunapots", was a fourteen-line piece written in the style of "Jabberwocky", using Carrollian words like "wyrtle" and "graftiens". (Note: Lewisohn states it was Lennon's first poem but does not date it. It was later included in the 68th issue of Mersey Beat, published on 27 February 1964 as "The Land of Lunapots" alongside his poem "The Tales of Hermit Fred".) Where Carroll's poem opens "'Twas brillig, and the ...", Lennon's begins:

T'was custard time and as I
Snuffed at the haggie pie pie
The noodles ran about my plunk
Which rode my wrytle uncle drunk
...

From around the age of eight, Lennon spent much of his time drawing, inspired by cartoonist Ronald Searle's work in the St Trinian's School cartoon strips. He later enjoyed the illustrations of cartoonist James Thurber and began imitating his style around the age of fifteen. Uninterested in fine art and unable to create realistic likenesses, he enjoyed doodling and drawing witty cartoons, usually made with either a black pen or a fountain pen with black ink. Filling his school notebooks with vignettes, poetry and cartoons, he drew inspiration from British humorists such as Spike Milligan and "Professor" Stanley Unwin, including Milligan's radio comedy programme The Goon Show. He admired the programme's unique humour, characterised by attacks on establishment figures, surreal humour and punning wordplay, later writing that it was "the only proof that the WORLD was insane". Lennon collected his work in a school exercise book dubbed the Daily Howl, later described by Lennon's bandmate George Harrison as "jokes and avant-garde poetry". Made in the style of a newspaper, its cartoons and ads featured wordplay and gags, such as a column reporting: "Our late editor is dead, he died of death, which killed him".

Despite Lennon's love of literature, he was a chronic misspeller, saying in a 1968 interview that he "never got the idea of spelling", finding it less important than conveying an idea or story. Beatles historian Mark Lewisohn raises the possibility that Lennon had dyslexia – a condition that often went undiagnosed in the 1940s and 1950s – but counters that he exhibited no other related symptoms. Lennon's mother, Julia Lennon, similarly wrote with uncertain spelling and displayed weak grammar in her writing. American professor James Sauceda contends that Unwin's use of fractured English was the foremost influence on Lennon's writing style, and in a 1980 interview with Playboy, Lennon stated that the main influences on his writing "were always Lewis Carroll and The Goon Show, a combination of that".

=== Art college and Bill Harry ===
Although most teachers at Quarry Bank High School for Boys were annoyed at Lennon's lack of focus, he impressed his English master, Philip Burnett, who suggested he go to art school at the Liverpool College of Art. In 2006, Burnett's wife, June Harry, recalled of Lennon's cartoons: "I was intrigued by what I saw. They weren't academic drawings but hilarious and quite disturbing cartoons." She continued: "Phil enjoyed John's slant on life. He told me, 'He's a bit of a one-off. He's bright enough, but not much apart from music and doing his cartoons interests him.'" Having failed his GCE "O" levels, Lennon was admitted into the Liverpool College of Art solely on the basis of his art portfolio. While attending the school he befriended fellow student Bill Harry in 1957. When Harry heard that Lennon wrote poetry he asked to see some, later recalling: "He was embarrassed at first ... I got the impression that he felt that writing poetry was a bit effeminate because he had this tough macho image". After further pressing, Lennon relented and showed Harry a poem, who remembered it as "a rustic poem, it was pure British humour and comedy, and I loved it". Harry retrospectively stated that Lennon's writing style, especially his use of malapropisms, reminded him of Unwin. Harry described his poetry as displaying an "originality in its sheer lunacy", but found his sense of humour "absurdly cruel with its obsession with cripples, spastics and torture".

After Harry started the Liverpool newspaper Mersey Beat in 1961, Lennon made occasional contributions. His column "Beatcomber", a reference to the "Beachcomber" column of the Daily Express, included poems and short stories. (Note: Both Harry and Lennon have each claimed responsibility for coming up with the name "Beatcomber".) He typed his early pieces with an Imperial Good Companion Model T typewriter. By August 1962, his original typewriter was either broken or unavailable to him. He borrowed an acquaintance's, spurring him to write more prose and poetry. He enjoyed typewriters, but found that his slow typing left him unmotivated to write for long periods of time and so he focused on shorter pieces. He left keystroke errors uncorrected to add further wordplay. Excited about being in print, he brought 250 pieces to Harry, telling him he could publish whatever he wanted of them. Only two stories were published, "Small Sam" and "On Safairy with Whide Hunter", because Harry's fiancée Virginia accidentally threw out the other 248 during a move between offices. (Note: While acknowledging the deliberate misspellings which characterise Lennon's writings, Lewisohn suggests that the title "Small Sam" may have been a misprint on the part of Mersey Beat, given that the central character's name, Small Stan, is spelled as such fourteen times in the 150 word story. A piece in the 30 July 1964 issue of Mersey Beat quotes Lennon in calling the piece "Small Stan".) Harry later recalled that after telling him about the accident, Lennon broke down in tears.

=== Paul McCartney ===
Lennon's friend and bandmate Paul McCartney also enjoyed Alice in Wonderland, The Goon Show and the works of Thurber, and the two soon bonded through their mutual interests and similar senses of humour. Lennon impressed McCartney, who did not know anyone else that either owned a typewriter or wrote their own poetry. He found hilarious one of Lennon's earliest poems, "The Tale of Hermit Fred", especially its final lines:

I peel the bagpipes for my wife
And cut all negroes' hair
As breathing is my very life
And stop I do not dare.

Visiting Lennon's 251 Menlove Avenue home one day in July 1958, McCartney found him writing a poem and enjoyed the wordplay of lines like "a cup of teeth" and "in the early owls of the morecombe". Lennon let him help, with the two co-writing the poem "On Safairy with Whide Hunter", its title's origin likely the adventure serial White Hunter. Lewisohn suggests the renaming of the lead character at each appearance was probably Lennon's contribution, while lines that were likely McCartney's include: "Could be the Flying Docker on a case" and "No! But mable next week it will be my turn to beat the bus now standing at platforbe nine". He also suggests the character Jumble Jim was a reference to McCartney's father Jim McCartney. Lennon typically wrote his pieces by hand at home and would bring them when he and his band, the Beatles, were travelling in a car or van to a gig. Reading the pieces aloud, McCartney and Harrison would often make contributions of their own. Upon returning home, Lennon would type up the pieces, adding what he could remember of his friend's contributions.

== Publication and content ==
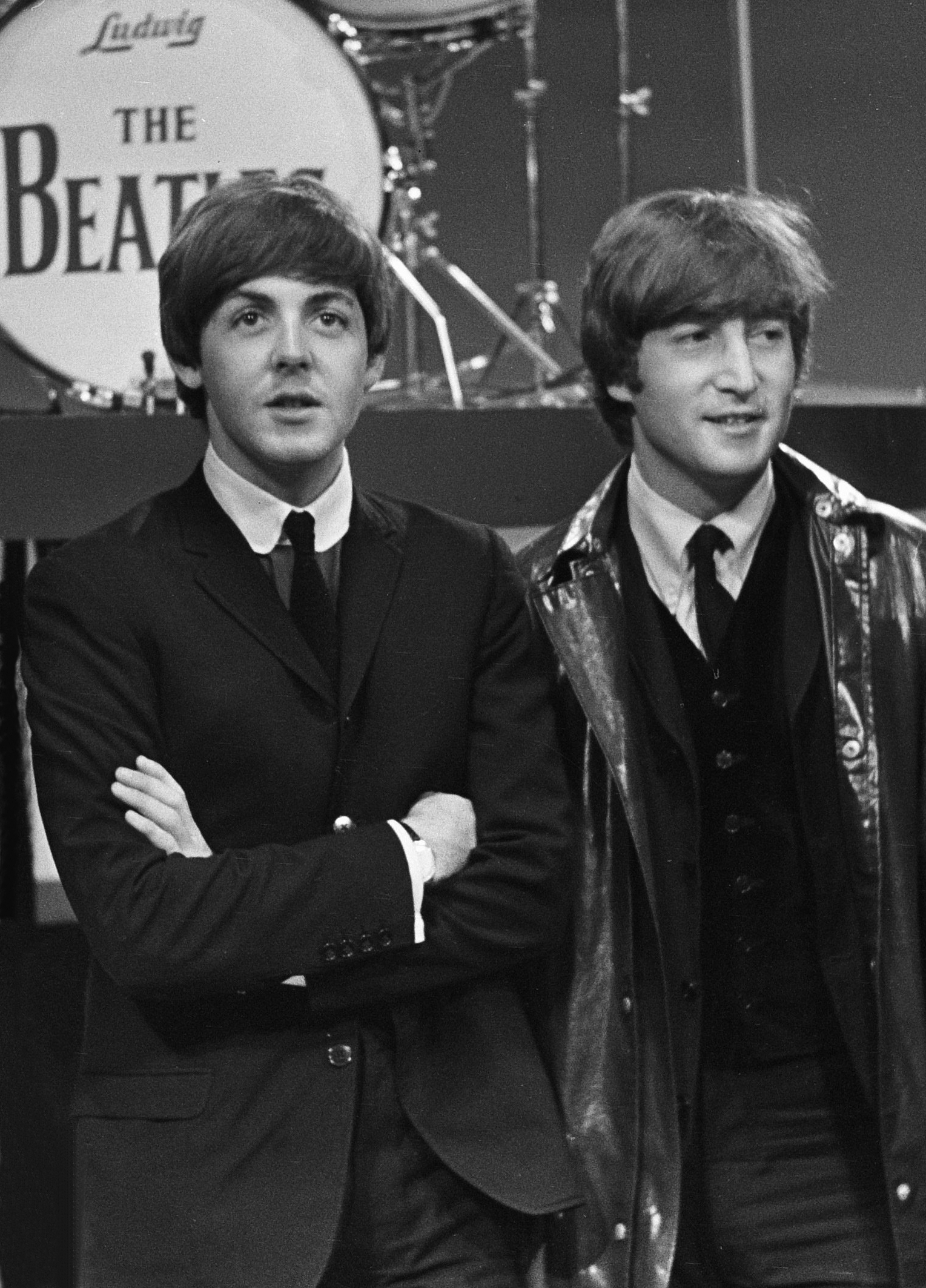
Paul McCartney (left) and John Lennon in June 1964. McCartney contributed an introduction, the book's title and co-wrote two of its pieces with Lennon.

In 1963, Tom Maschler, the literary director of Jonathan Cape, commissioned American journalist Michael Braun to write a book about the Beatles. Braun began following the band during their Autumn 1963 UK Tour in preparation for his 1964 book Love Me Do: The Beatles' Progress. Lennon showed Braun some of his writings and drawings, and Braun in turn showed them to Maschler, who recalled: "I thought they were wonderful and asked him who wrote them. When he told me John Lennon, I was immensely excited." At Braun's insistence, Maschler joined him and the band at Wimbledon Palais in London on 14 December 1963. Lennon showed Maschler more of his drawings, mainly doodles made on scrap pieces of paper that had mostly been done in July 1963 while the Beatles played a residency in Margate. Maschler encouraged him to continue with his pieces and drawings, then selected the title In His Own Write from a list of around twenty prospects, the pick originally an idea of McCartney. Among the rejected titles were In His Own Write and Draw, The Transistor Negro, Left Hand Left Hand and Stop One and Buy Me. (Note: Left Hand Left Hand was a reference to the book Left Hand, Right Hand! by Osbert Sitwell, and Stop One and Buy Me was a play on ice-cream carts that advertise "Stop Me and Buy One".)

Lennon signed a contract with Jonathan Cape for the book on 6 January 1964, receiving an advance of £1,000 (equivalent to £18,000 in 2025). He contributed 26 drawings and 31 pieces of writing, including 23 prose pieces and eight poems, bringing the book's length to 80 pages. Its pieces range in length from the eight-line poems "Good Dog Nigel" and "The Moldy Moldy Man" to the three-page story "Scene three Act one". Lennon reported that his work on the book's illustrations was the most drawing he had done since leaving art school. Most of the written content was new, but some had been done previously, including the stories "On Safairy with Whide Hunter" (1958), "Henry and Harry" (1959), "Liddypool" (1961 as "Around And About"), "No Flies on Frank" (1962) and "Randolf's Party" (1962), and the poem "I Remember Arnold" (1958), which he wrote following the death of his mother, Julia. Lennon worked spontaneously and generally did not return to pieces after writing them, though he did revise "On Safairy with Whide Hunter" in mid-July 1962, adding a reference to the song "The Lion Sleeps Tonight", a hit in early 1962. (Note: When originally published in the 14 September 1961 issue of Mersey Beat, Lennon's piece "Around And About" recounted fictional Liverpool landmarks, including the "Casbin" and "Jackarandy" clubs (playing on the Casbah Club and the Jacaranda, respectively). When he published In His Own Write, he included the piece under the new title "Liddypool", omitting the list of attractions and the following sentences: "We've been engaged for 43 years and he still smokes. I am an unmurdered mother of 19 years, am I pensionable? My dog bites me when I bite it.") Among the book's literary references are "I Wandered", which includes several plays on the title of the poem "I Wandered Lonely as a Cloud" by English poet William Wordsworth; "Treasure Ivan", which is a variation on the plot of Treasure Island by Robert Louis Stevenson; and "At the Denis", which paraphrases a scene at a dentist's office from Carlo Barone's English-teaching book, A Manual of Conversation English-Italian.

It's about nothing. If you like it, you like it; if you don't, you don't. That's all there is to it. There's nothing deep in it, it's just meant to be funny. I put things down on sheets of paper and stuff them in my pocket. When I have enough, I have a book.

— John Lennon on In His Own Write, 1964

In His Own Write was published in the UK on 23 March 1964, retailing for 9s 6d (equivalent to £9 in 2025). Lennon attended a launch party at Jonathan Cape's London offices the day before. Maschler refused a request from his superiors at Jonathan Cape that the cover depict Lennon holding a guitar, instead opting for a simple head shot. Photographer Robert Freeman designed the first edition of the book, a black-and-white photograph he took of Lennon also adorning the cover. The back cover includes a humorous autobiography of Lennon, "About the Awful", again written in his unorthodox style. The book became an immediate best-seller, selling out on its first day. Only 25,000 copies of the first edition were printed, necessitating several reprints, including two in the last week of March 1964 and five more by January 1965. In its first ten months, the book sold almost 200,000 copies, eventually reaching around 300,000 copies bought in Britain. Simon & Schuster published In His Own Write in the US on 27 April 1964, retailing for US$2.50 (equivalent to US$26 in 2025). The American edition was identical to the British, except that publishers added the caption "The Writing Beatle!" to the cover. The book was a best-seller in the US, where its publication took place around two months after the Beatles' first visit to the country and amid Beatlemania, the hysteria that surrounded the group.

=== Contributions by the other Beatles ===
McCartney contributed an introduction to In His Own Write, writing that its content was nonsensical yet funny. (Note: Submitting the introduction to the publisher, McCartney wrote: "Dear Mr Cape, there are only 234 words but I don't care." A publisher employee attempted to rewrite it, but McCartney's original was the version published.) In 1964 interviews, Lennon said that two pieces were co-authored with McCartney. Due to a publishing error only "On Safairy with Whide Hunter" was marked as such – being "[w]ritten in conjugal with Paul" – the other piece remaining unidentified.

Beatles drummer Ringo Starr, prone to incorrect wordings and malapropisms – dubbed "Ringoisms" by his bandmates – may have contributed a line to the book. Finishing up after a long day, perhaps 19 March 1964, he commented "it's been a hard day", and, on noticing it was dark, added "'s night" ("it's been a hard day's night"). While both Lennon and Starr later identified the phrase as Starr's, Lewisohn raises doubts that the phrase originated with him. He writes that if the 19 March dating is correct, that places it after Lennon had already included it in the story "Sad Michael", with the line "He'd had a hard days night that day". By 19 March, copies of In His Own Write had already been printed. Lewisohn suggests that Starr may have previously read or heard it in Lennon's story, while journalist Nicholas Schaffner simply writes the phrase originated with Lennon's poem. Beatles biographer Alan Clayson suggests the phrase's inspiration was Eartha Kitt's 1963 song "I Had a Hard Day Last Night", the B-side of her single "Lola Lola". After director Dick Lester suggested A Hard Day's Night as the title of the Beatles' 1964 film, Lennon used it again in the song of the same name.

== Reception ==
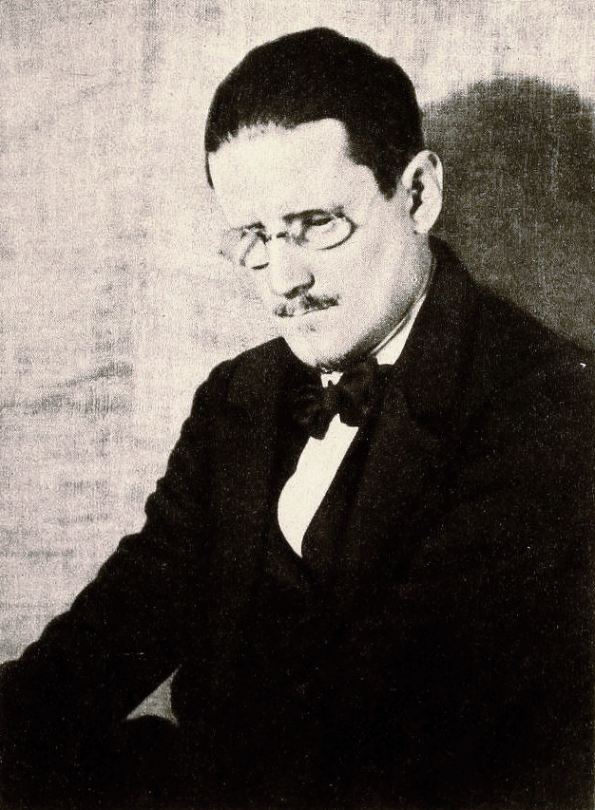
Irish writer James Joyce in 1922. Though Lennon was unfamiliar with his work, critics compared the book to Joyce's later writings.

In His Own Write received critical acclaim, with favourable reviews in London's The Sunday Times and The Observer. Among the most popular poems and stories in the collection are "No Flies on Frank", "Good Dog Nigel", "The Wrestling Dog", "I Sat Belonely" and "Deaf Ted, Danoota, (and me)". The Times Literary Supplement's reviewer wrote that the book "is worth the attention of anyone who fears for the impoverishment of the English language and British imagination". In The New York Times, Harry Gilroy admired the writing style, describing it as "like a Beatle possessed", while George Melly for The Sunday Times wrote: "It is fascinating of course to climb inside a Beatle's head to see what's going on there, but what really counts is that what's going on there really is fascinating." The Virginia Quarterly Review called the book "a true delight" that finally gave "those intellectuals who have become stuck with Beatlemania ... a serious literary excuse for their visceral pleasures". Gloria Steinem opined in a December 1964 profile of Lennon for Cosmopolitan that the book showed him to be the only one of the band who had "signs of a talent outside the hothouse world of musical fadism and teenage worship".

Though Lennon had never read him, comparisons to Irish writer James Joyce were common. In his review of the book, author Tom Wolfe mentions Spike Milligan as an influence, but writes that the "imitations of Joyce" were what "most intrigued the literati" in America and England: "the mimicry of prayers, liturgies, manuals and grammars, the mad homonyms, especially biting ones such as 'Loud' for 'Lord', which both [Joyce and Lennon] use". In a favourable review for The Nation, Peter Schickele drew comparison to Edward Lear, Carroll, Thurber and Joyce, adding that even those "with a predisposition toward the Beatles" will be "pleasantly shocked" when reading it. Time cited the same influences before admiring the book's typography, written "as if pages had been set by a drunken linotypist". Newsweek called Lennon "an heir to the Anglo-American tradition of nonsense", but found that the constant Carroll and Joyce comparisons were faulty, emphasising instead Lennon's uniqueness and "original spontaneity". Bill Harry published a review in the 26 March 1964 issue of Mersey Beat, written as a parody of Lennon's style. (Note: In Literary Lennon, Sauceda presents excerpts of Harry's review, along with his interpretation of its content.) In an accompanying "translation" of his review, he predicted that while it would "[a]lmost certaintly ... be a best seller", it could lend itself to controversy, with newer Beatles fans likely to be "puzzled by its way-out, off beat and sometimes sick humour".

One of the few negative responses to the book came from the Conservative Member of Parliament Charles Curran. On 19 June 1964, during a House of Commons debate on automation, he quoted the poem "Deaf Ted, Danoota, (and me)", then spoke derisively about the book, arguing that Lennon's verse was a symptom of a poor education system. He suggested that Lennon was "in a pathetic state of near-literacy", adding that "[h]e seems to have picked up bits of Tennyson, Browning, and Robert Louis Stevenson while listening with one ear to the football results on the Wireless." (Note: During the debate, Curran's fellow Conservative MP Norman Miscampbell responded to the complaints. Disputing that Lennon was poorly educated, he described the Beatles on the whole as "highly intelligent, highly articulate and highly engaging", and added that it would be wrong to assume their success "came from anything other than great skill".) The most unfavourable review of the book came from critic Christopher Ricks, who wrote in New Statesman that anyone unaware of the Beatles would be unlikely to draw pleasure from the book.

=== Reactions of Lennon and the Beatles ===
I really didn't think the book would even get reviewed by the book reviewers ... I didn't think people would accept the book like they did. To tell you the truth they took the book more seriously than I did myself. It just began as a laugh for me.

— John Lennon, 1964

While the success of In His Own Write pleased Lennon, he was surprised by both the attention it received and its positive reception. In a 1965 interview, he admitted to purchasing all the books that critics compared to his, including one by Lear, one by Geoffrey Chaucer and Finnegans Wake by Joyce. He further stated that he did not see the similarities, except "[perhaps] a little bit of Finnegans Wake ... but anybody who changes words is going to be compared". In a 1968 interview, he said that reading Finnegans Wake "was great, and I dug it and felt as though [Joyce] was an old friend", though he found the book difficult to read in its entirety. (Note: In an undated quotation, Lennon stated that reading Joyce for the first time was "like finding Daddy".)

Among Lennon's bandmates, Starr did not read the book, but Harrison and McCartney enjoyed it. Harrison stated in February 1964 that the book included "some great [gags]", and Lennon recalled McCartney was especially fond of the book, being "dead keen" about it. In Beatles manager Brian Epstein's 1964 autobiography A Cellarful of Noise, he commented: "I was deeply gratified that a Beatle could detach himself completely from Beatleism and create such impact as an author". (Note: Derek Taylor, the Beatles' press officer, ghostwrote A Cellarful of Noise after extensively interviewing Epstein.) Beatles producer George Martin – a fan of The Goon Show – and his wife Judy Lockhart-Smith similarly enjoyed Lennon's writings, with Martin calling them "terribly funny". (Note: Martin produced albums for The Goon Show's individual members, including one for Milligan in late 1961. While some sources state that Martin produced albums for the group, Lewisohn clarifies that this is a popular misconception, since Martin only recorded the three Goons individually or during a collaboration.) In an August 1964 interview, Lennon identified "Scene three Act one" as his favourite piece in the book.

=== Foyle's Literary Luncheon ===
Following the book's publication, Christina Foyle, the founder of Foyles bookshop, honoured Lennon at one of Foyle's Literary Luncheons. Osbert Lancaster chaired the event on 23 April 1964 at the Dorchester hotel in London. (Note: At the same time, the other Beatles filmed the closing sequence of "Can't Buy Me Love" for A Hard Day's Night, leaving Lennon absent from the scene in the completed film.) Among around six hundred attendees were several eminent guests, including Helen Shapiro, Yehudi Menuhin and Wilfrid Brambell. (Note: Other guests included Mary Quant, Millicent Martin, Harry Secombe, Marty Wilde, Arthur Askey, Joan Littlewood, Victor Silvester, Carl Giles, Alma Cogan, Dora Bryan, Lionel Bart, Cicely Courtneidge and Colin Wilson.) Hungover from a night spent at the Ad Lib Club, Lennon admitted to a journalist at the event that he was "scared stiff". He was reluctant to perform the expected speech, getting Epstein to advise luncheon organisers Foyle and Ben Perrick the day before the event that he would not be speaking. The two were taken aback, but assumed that Lennon meant he would only provide a short speech.

At the event, after Lancaster introduced him, Lennon stood and only said: "Uh, thank you very much, and God bless you. You've got a lucky face." Foyle was irritated, while Perrick recalls there was "some slight feeling of bewilderment" among attendees. Epstein gave a speech to avoid further disappointing any diners that had hoped to hear from Lennon. In A Cellarful of Noise, Epstein expressed of Lennon's lack of a speech: "He was not prepared to do something which was not only unnatural to him, but also something he might have done badly. He was not going to fail." Perrick reflects that Lennon retained the affection of his audience due to his "charm and charisma", with attendees still happily queuing afterwards for signed copies.

== Analysis ==
=== Against Lennon's songwriting ===
You just stick a few images together, thread them together, and you call it poetry. But I was just using the mind that wrote In His Own Write to write that song.

— John Lennon reflecting on writing "I Am the Walrus", 1980

Later commentators have discussed the book's prose in relation to Lennon's songwriting, both in how it differed from his contemporary writing and in how it anticipates his later work. Writer Chris Ingham describes the book as "surreal poetry", displaying "a darkness and bite ... that was light years away from 'I Want to Hold Your Hand'". Professor of English Ian Marshall describes Lennon's prose as "mad wordplay", noting the Lewis Carroll influence and suggesting it anticipates the lyrics of later songs like "Lucy in the Sky with Diamonds" and "I Am the Walrus". Critic Tim Riley compares the short story "Unhappy Frank" to "I Am the Walrus", though he calls the former "a good deal more oblique and less cunning".

Walter Everett describes the book as including "Joycean dialect substitutions, Carrollian portmanteau words, and rich-sounding stream-of-consciousness double-entendre". Unlike Carroll, Lennon generally did not create new words in his writing, but instead used homonyms (such as grate for great) and other phonological and morphological distortions (such as peoble for people). Both Everett and Beatles researcher Kevin Howlett discuss the influence of Alice's Adventures in Wonderland and Through the Looking-Glass on both of Lennon's books and on the lyrics for "Lucy in the Sky with Diamonds". Everett singles out the poems "Deaf Ted, Danoota, (and me)" and "I Wandered" as examples of this influence, quoting an excerpt from "I Wandered" to illustrate this:

Past grisby trees and hulky builds
Past ratters and bradder sheep
...
Down hovey lanes and stoney claves
Down ricketts and stickly myth
In a fatty hebrew gurth
I wandered humply as a sock
To meet bad Bernie Smith

In his book Can't Buy Me Love, Jonathan Gould compares the poem "No Flies on Frank" to Lennon's 1967 song "Good Morning Good Morning", seeing both as illustrating the "dispirited domestic milieu" of "protagonists [who] drag themselves through the day 'crestfalled and defective'". Everett suggests that while the character Bungalow Bill in Lennon's 1968 song "The Continuing Story of Bungalow Bill" is generally understood to be a portmanteau of Jungle Jim and Buffalo Bill, the name also could have its origins in the character Jumble Jim from Lennon and McCartney's short story "On Safairy with Whide Hunter".

On 23 March 1964 – the same day the book was published in the UK – Lennon went to Lime Grove Studios, West London, to film a segment promoting it. The BBC programme Tonight broadcast the segment live, with presenters Cliff Michelmore, Derek Hart and Kenneth Allsop reading excerpts. A four-minute interview between Allsop and Lennon followed, with Allsop challenging him to try using similar wordplay and imagination in his songwriting. Similar questions about the banality of his song lyrics – including from musician Bob Dylan – became common following the publication of his book, pushing him to write deeper, more introspective songs in the years that followed. In a December 1970 interview with Jann Wenner of Rolling Stone, Lennon explained that early in his career he made a conscious split between writing pop music for public consumption and the expressive writing found in In His Own Write, with the latter representing "the personal stories ... expressive of my personal emotions". In his 1980 Playboy interview, he recalled the Allsop interview as being the impetus for his writing "In My Life". Writer John C. Winn mentions songs like "I'm a Loser", "You've Got to Hide Your Love Away" and "Help!" as exemplifying Lennon's move to deeper writing in the year after the book. Music scholar Terence O'Grady describes the "surprising twists" of Lennon's 1965 song "Norwegian Wood (This Bird Has Flown)" as more similar to In His Own Write than his earlier songs, and Sauceda mentions several of Lennon's later Beatles songs – including "I Am the Walrus", "What's the New Mary Jane", "Come Together", "Dig a Pony" – as demonstrating his ability for "sound-sense writing", where words are assembled not for their meaning but instead for their rhythm and for "the joy of sound".

=== James Sauceda and Finnegans Wake ===
Sauceda produced the only comprehensive study of Lennon's writings in his 1983 book Literary Lennon: A Comedy of Letters, providing a postmodern dissection of both In His Own Write and Lennon's next book of nonsense literature, A Spaniard in the Works. Everett describes the book as "a thorough but sometimes wrongheaded postmodern Finnegans Wake-inspired parsing". Sauceda, for example, casts doubt on Lennon's claim that he had never read Joyce before writing In His Own Write. He suggests that the lines "he was debb and duff and could not speeg" and "Practice daily but not if you are Mutt and Jeff" from the pieces "Sad Michael" and "All Abord Speeching", respectively, were influenced by a passage from Finnegans Wake discussing whether someone is deaf or deaf-mute, reading:

Jute. – Are you jeff?
Mutt. – Somehards.
Jute. – But are you not jeffmute?
Mutt. – Noho. Only an utterer.
Jute. – Whoa? Whoat is the mutter with you?

Author Peter Doggett is even more dismissive of Sauceda than Everett, criticising Sauceda for missing references to British popular culture. In particular, he mentions Sauceda's analysis of the story "The Famous Five Through Woenow Abbey", which concluded that the Famous Five of the story refers to Epstein and the Beatles, but was not aware that the story parodies the popular British children's novels The Famous Five, written by Enid Blyton – referred to as "Enig Blyter" in Lennon's story. Riley calls Sauceda's insights "keen", but suggests more can be understood by analysing the works with reference to Lennon's biography. Gould comments that The Goon Show was Lennon's closest experience to the style of Finnegans Wake, and describes Milligan's 1959 book Silly Verse for Kids as "the direct antecedent to In His Own Write."

=== Against Lennon's biography ===
I used to hide my real emotions in gobbledegook, like In His Own Write. When I wrote teenage poems, I wrote in gobbledegook because I was always hiding my real emotions from [my aunt] Mimi [Smith].

— John Lennon, 1971

Before he signed with Jonathan Cape, Lennon wrote prose and poetry to keep for himself and share with his friends, leaving his pieces filled with private meanings and in-jokes. Quoted in a February 1964 piece in Mersey Beat, Harrison said with regard to the book that "[t]he 'with-it' people will get the gags and there are some great ones". Lewisohn states that Lennon based the story "Henry and Harry" on an experience of Harrison, whose father gifted him electrician's tools for Christmas 1959, implying he expected his son to become an electrician despite Harrison's disagreement. In the story, Lennon writes that such jobs were "brummer striving", explaining in a 1968 television interview that the term referred to "all those jobs that people have that they don't want. And there's probably about 90 percent brummer strivers watching in at the moment." The 1962 story "Randolf's Party" was never discussed by Lennon, but Lewisohn suggests he most likely wrote it about former Beatles drummer Pete Best. Lewisohn mentions similarities between Best and the lead character, including an absent father figure and Best's first name being Randolph. Best biographer Mallory Curley describes the lines "We never liked you all the years we've known you. You were never raelly [sic] one of us you know, soft head" as, "the crux of Pete's Beatles career, in one paragraph."

Riley opines that the short story "Unhappy Frank" can be read as Lennon's "screed against 'mother'", aimed at both his aunt Mimi and late-mother Julia for their over-protectiveness and absence, respectively. The poem "Good Dog Nigel" tells the story of a happy dog that is put down. Riley suggests it was inspired by Mimi putting down Lennon's dog, Sally, and that the dog in the poem shares its name with Lennon's childhood friend Nigel Walley, a witness to Julia's death. Prone to hitting his girlfriends as a teenager, Lennon also included several domestic violence allusions in the book, such as "No Flies on Frank", where a man beats his wife to death and then tries to deliver the corpse to his mother-in-law. (Note: In The Beatles: The Authorised Biography, Lennon stated: "I was in a blind rage for two years. I was either drunk or fighting. There was something the matter with me". In his 1980 interview with Playboy, he said that "hitting females is something I'm always ashamed of and still can't talk about – I'll have to be a lot older before I can face that in public, about how I treated women as a youngster".) In his book The Lives of John Lennon, author Albert Goldman interprets the story as relating to Lennon's feelings about his wife Cynthia and Mimi.

Sauceda and Ingham comment that the book includes several references to "cripples", Lennon having had developed phobias of physical and mental disabilities as a child. Thelma Pickles, Lennon's girlfriend in the autumn of 1958, later recalled he would joke with disabled people he encountered in public, including "[accosting] men in wheelchairs and [jeering], 'How did you lose your legs? Chasing the wife?'" In an interview with Hunter Davies for The Beatles: The Authorised Biography, Lennon admitted that he "did have a cruel humor", suggesting it was a way of hiding his emotions. He concluded: "I would never hurt a cripple. It was just part of our jokes, our way of life." During the Beatles' tours, people with physical handicaps were often brought to meet the band, with some parents hoping that their child being touched by a Beatle would heal them. In his 1970 interview with Rolling Stone, Lennon remembered, "[w]e were just surrounded by cripples and blind people all the time and when we would go through corridors they would be all touching us. It got like that, it was horrifying". Sauceda suggests that these strange recent experiences led to Lennon to incorporating them into his stories. For Doggett, the essential qualities of Lennon's writing are "cruelty, [a] matter-of-fact attitude to death and destruction, and [a] quick descent from bathos into gibberish".

=== Anti-authority and the Beat movement ===
One of the reviews of In His Own Write tried to put me in this satire boom with Peter Cook and those people that came out of [the University of] Cambridge, saying, "Well, he's just satirising the normal things, like the Church and the State," which is what I did. Those are the things that keep you satirising, because they're the only things.

— John Lennon, 1970

In His Own Write includes elements of anti-authority sentiment, disparaging both politics and Christianity, with Lennon recalling that the book was "pretty heavy on the church" with "many knocks at religion" and includes a scene depicting a dispute between a worker and a capitalist. Riley suggests that contemporary reviewers were overtaken by the book's "loopy, scabrous energy", overlooking the "subversion [which] lay embedded in its cryptic asides". The story "A letter", for example, references Christine Keeler and the Profumo affair, featuring a drawing of her and the closing line, "We hope this fires you as you keeler."

Lennon and his best friend in art college, Stu Sutcliffe, often discussed writers like Henry Miller, Jack Kerouac and other Beat poets, such as Gregory Corso and Lawrence Ferlinghetti. Lennon, Sutcliffe and Harry sometimes interacted with the local British beat scene, and, in June 1960, the Beatles – then known as the Silver Beetles – provided musical backing for the beat poet Royston Ellis during a poetry reading at the Jacaranda coffee bar in Liverpool. While Lennon suggested in a 1965 interview that if he had not been a Beatle he "might have been a Beat Poet", author Greg Herriges declares that In His Own Write's irreverent attacks on the mainstream ranked Lennon among the best of his predecessors in the Beat Generation. Journalist Simon Warner disagrees, positing that Lennon's writing style owed little to the Beat movement, being instead largely derived from the nonsense tradition of the late nineteenth century.

=== Illustrations ===
The illustration accompanying the piece "Randolf's Party", extending onto another page.

The illustrations of In His Own Write have received comparatively little attention. Doggett writes that the book's drawings are similar to the "shapeless figures" of Thurber, but with Lennon's unique touch. He interprets much of the art as displaying the same fascination with cripples apparent in the text, joining faces to "unwieldy, joke-animal bodies" alongside figures "distorted almost beyond humanity". Journalist Scott Gutterman describes the characters as "strange, protoplasmic creatures", and "lumpen everyman and everywoman figures" joined by animals, "[gamboling] around an empty landscape, engaged in obscure pursuits".

Analysing the illustration accompanying the piece "Randolf's Party", Gutterman describes the group as "gossiping, frowning, and bunching together", but while some figures adhere to regular social conventions, some fly away out of the image. Doggett interprets the same drawing as including "Neanderthal men", some merely faces attached to balloons, while others "[boast] Cubist profiles with one eye hovering just outside their faces". Sauceda suggests the figures of the drawing reappear in the Beatles' 1968 animated film, Yellow Submarine, and describes the "balloon heads" as a metaphor for people's "empty-headedness". Doggett and Sauceda each identify self-portraits among Lennon's drawings, including one of a Lennon-like figure flying through the air, which Doggett determines to be one of the book's best illustrations. Doggett interprets it as evoking Lennon's "wish-fulfillment dreams", while Sauceda and Gutterman each see the drawing as representing the freedom Lennon felt in making his art.

== Legacy ==
Cultural commentators of the 1960s often focused on Lennon as the leading artistic and literary figure in the Beatles. In her study of Beatles historiography, historian Erin Torkelson Weber suggests that the publication of In His Own Write reinforced these perceptions, with many viewing Lennon as "the smart one" of the group, and that the band's first film, A Hard Day's Night, further emphasised that view. Everett arrives at similar conclusions, writing that, however unfairly, Lennon was often described as more artistically adventurous than McCartney in part because of the publication of his two books. Communications professor Michael R. Frontani states that the book served to further distinguish Lennon's image within the Beatles, while Independent writer Andy Gill felt that it and A Spaniard in the Works revealed Lennon to be "the sharpest Beatle, a man of acid wit".

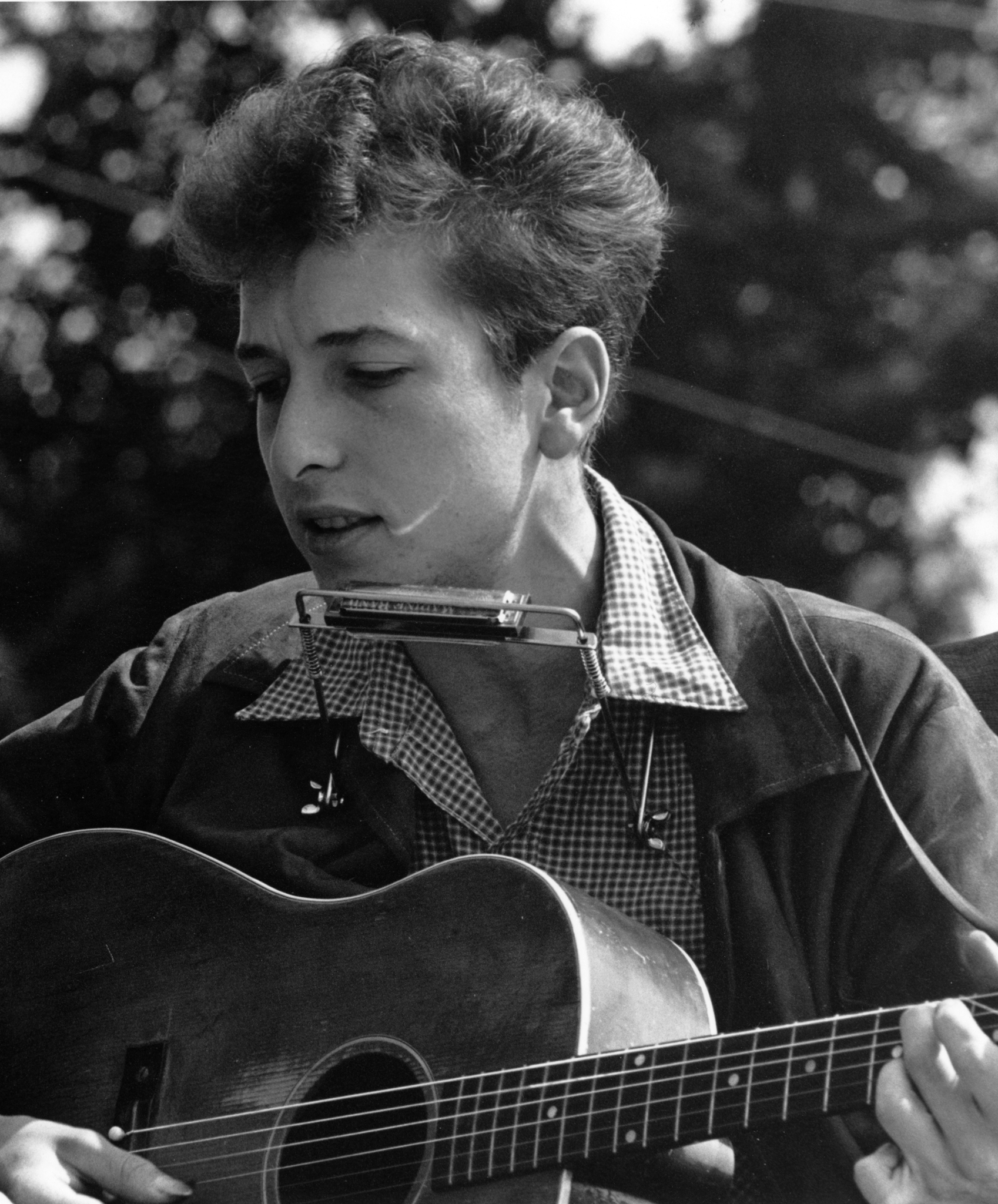
American musician Bob Dylan in 1963. Inspired by In His Own Write, he began writing his first collection of poetry in 1965, published in 1971 as Tarantula.

Beatles writer Kenneth Womack suggests that, paired with the Beatles' debut film, the book challenged the band's "non-believers", made up of those outside their then largely teenage fanbase, a contention with which philosophy professor Bernard Gendron agrees, writing that the two pieces of media initiated "a major reversal of the public assessment of the Beatles' aesthetic worth." Doggett groups the book with the Beatles' more general move from the "classic working-class pop milieu" towards "an arty middle-class environment". He argues that the band's invitation into the British establishment – such as their interactions with photographer Robert Freeman, director Dick Lester and publisher Tom Maschler, among others – was unique for pop musicians of the time and threatened to erode elements of the British class system. Prince Philip of the British royal family read the book and said he enjoyed it thoroughly, while Canadian Prime Minister Pierre Trudeau described Lennon in 1969 as "a pretty good poet". The book resulted in numerous businesses and charities requesting that Lennon produce illustrations. (Note: The only offer Lennon accepted was to design a Christmas card for the charity Oxfam. The illustration depicts a spherical robin, and is the same drawing that accompanies the piece "The Fat Budgie" in A Spaniard in the Works. Doggett writes that roughly half a million cards were first issued on 19 September 1964, though author Steve Turner writes the card was printed for Christmas 1965. Some at Oxfam felt the card to be in poor taste. The Reverend Frederick Nickalls of Barnehurst, Kent, complained that it "has nothing to do with Christmas. ... Those old world pictures of stage coaches, snow and candles are more Christian than The Fat Budgie.") In 2014, the broker Sotheby's auctioned over one hundred of Lennon's manuscripts for In His Own Write and A Spaniard in the Works from Maschler's collection. The short stories, poems and line drawings sold for US$2.9 million (US$3.9 million adjusted for inflation), more than double their pre-sale estimate.

Lennon issuing a book of poetry before Bob Dylan subverted expectations in Britain, where Lennon was still seen as a simple pop star and Dylan was lauded as a poet. Inspired by In His Own Write, Dylan began his first book of poetry in 1965, later published in 1971 as Tarantula. (Note: Dylan stated in 2001 that his manager Albert Grossman signed him up to write the book without consulting him. Journalist Colin Irwin also suggests that Dylan was commissioned to write the work, but Heylin disputes this, stating that Grossman's role only extended to discussions with publishing companies and that Dylan was enthusiastic about the project.) Using similar wordplay, though with fewer puns, Dylan described it contemporaneously as "a John Lennon-type book". Dylan biographer Clinton Heylin suggests that Lennon's piece "A Letter" is the most overt example of In His Own Write's influence on Tarantula, with several similar satirical letters appearing in Dylan's collection. Three volumes of Dylan's personal writings were later booklegged under the title In His Own Write: Personal Sketches, released in 1980, 1990 and 1992. Beyond influencing Dylan, the book also inspired Michael Maslin, a cartoonist for The New Yorker magazine. A fellow Thurber enthusiast, he identified it, particularly the piece "The Fat Growth of Eric Hearble", as his introduction to "crazy wacky humor".

== Other versions ==
=== The Penguin John Lennon ===
Cover of The Penguin John Lennon (1966), designed by Alan Aldridge and photographed by Brian Duffy.

In 1965, Lennon published a second book of nonsense literature, A Spaniard in the Works, expanding on the wordplay and parody of In His Own Write. While it was a best-seller, reviewers were generally unenthusiastic, considering it similar to his first book yet without the benefit of being unexpected. He began a third book, planned for release in February 1966, but abandoned it soon after, leaving the two books the only ones published in his lifetime. (Note: In 1986, Harper & Row published Skywriting by Word of Mouth, a posthumous collection of his unreleased writings, most of which were made during his "house-husband" period in the late 1970s. Doggett comments that the book's writing style differs greatly from In His Own Write and A Spaniard in the Works, relying much more on sardonic humour.)

In what Doggett terms "an admission that his literary career was at an end", Lennon consented to both of his books being joined into a single paperback. On 27 October 1966, Penguin Books published The Penguin John Lennon. The first edition to join both of his books into one volume, the publishers altered the proportions of several illustrations in the process. The art director of Penguin Books, Alan Aldridge, initially conceived that the cover would consist of a painting depicting Lennon as a penguin, but the publishing director rejected the idea as disrespectful to the company. Aldridge commissioned British photographer Brian Duffy to take a cover photo with Lennon posing next to a birdcage. On the day of photoshoot, Aldridge changed his mind and instead had Lennon dress as the comic book character Superman, with the imagery meant to suggest he had now conquered music, film and literature. DC Comics, the owners of the Superman franchise, claimed the image infringed on their copyright, so Aldridge retouched the photo, replacing the S on the costume's shield with Lennon's initials. At least two more covers were used in the next four years; one shows Lennon wearing several pairs of glasses, while the 1969 edition shows a portrait of Lennon with long hair and a beard.

=== Translations ===
In His Own Write has been translated into several different languages. Authors Christiane Rochefort and Rachel Mizraki translated the book into French, published in 1965 as En flagrant délire with a new humorous preface titled "Intraduction [sic] des traditrices". Scholar Margaret-Anne Hutton suggests that the book's irreverence, black humour and anti-establishment stance pairs well with Rochefort's style and that its wordplay anticipates that of her 1966 book, Une Rose pour Morrison. The book was translated into Finnish by the translator responsible for adapting the works of Joyce.

Author Robert Gernhardt attempted to convince Arno Schmidt – who later worked on Joyce translations – to translate In His Own Write into German, but Schmidt rejected the offer. Instead, publisher Helmut Kossodo and Wolf Dieter Rogosky each translated some parts of the work, publishing a bilingual German/English version, In seiner eigenen Schreibe, in 1965. Author Karl Bruckmaier published a new edition in 2010, updating several cultural references in the process. (Note: For example, he attempted to "pimp up" the text by replacing a reference to German football manager "Sepp Berserker" (Sepp Herberger) with "Maharishi Mahesh Löwi" (Jogi Löw). Both German translations have received praise, but also criticism. Literary scholar and translator Friedhelm Rathjen describes them as "one-dimensional" and criticises that the title's wordplay on "in his own right" is not reflected in the translation.) Argentine author Jaime Rest translated the book into Spanish in the 1960s as En su tinta, using a Buenos Aires urban-dialect. Andy Ehrenhaus published a bilingual Spanish/English edition of both In His Own Write and A Spaniard in the Works in 2009, with his strategy of imagining Lennon as writing in Spanish described by one commentator as "lunatically effective".

== Adaptations ==
=== The Lennon Play: In His Own Write ===
==== Writing (1966–1968) ====
When Lennon began writing A Spaniard in the Works, he considered making a spoken-word LP with extracts from In His Own Write but ultimately decided against it. In 1966, Theodore Mann, the artistic director of New York City's Circle in the Square, commissioned American playwright Adrienne Kennedy to write a new play. Kennedy came up with the idea of adapting Lennon's two books for the stage, flying to London to discuss the idea with Jonathan Cape. Around the end of 1967, actor Victor Spinetti began working with Kennedy to adapt the two books into a one-act play. Spinetti had acted in the Beatles' films A Hard Day's Night, Help! and Magical Mystery Tour, and became good friends with Lennon. Originally titled Scene Three, Act One after one of In His Own Write's stories and staged under that name in late-1967, the play's title was changed to The Lennon Play: In His Own Write. The play joins elements of the books together to tell the story of an imaginative boy growing up, escaping from the mundane world through his daydreaming. Lennon sent notes and additions for the play to Spinetti, and held final approval on Spinetti and Kennedy's script. Kennedy was let go from the project before it was finished. (Note: Kennedy detailed a real and fictional account of her experience writing the play in her 1990 book Deadly Triplets. She later dramatised her involvement in the adaption with her 2008 Off-Broadway play, Mom, How Did You Meet the Beatles?)

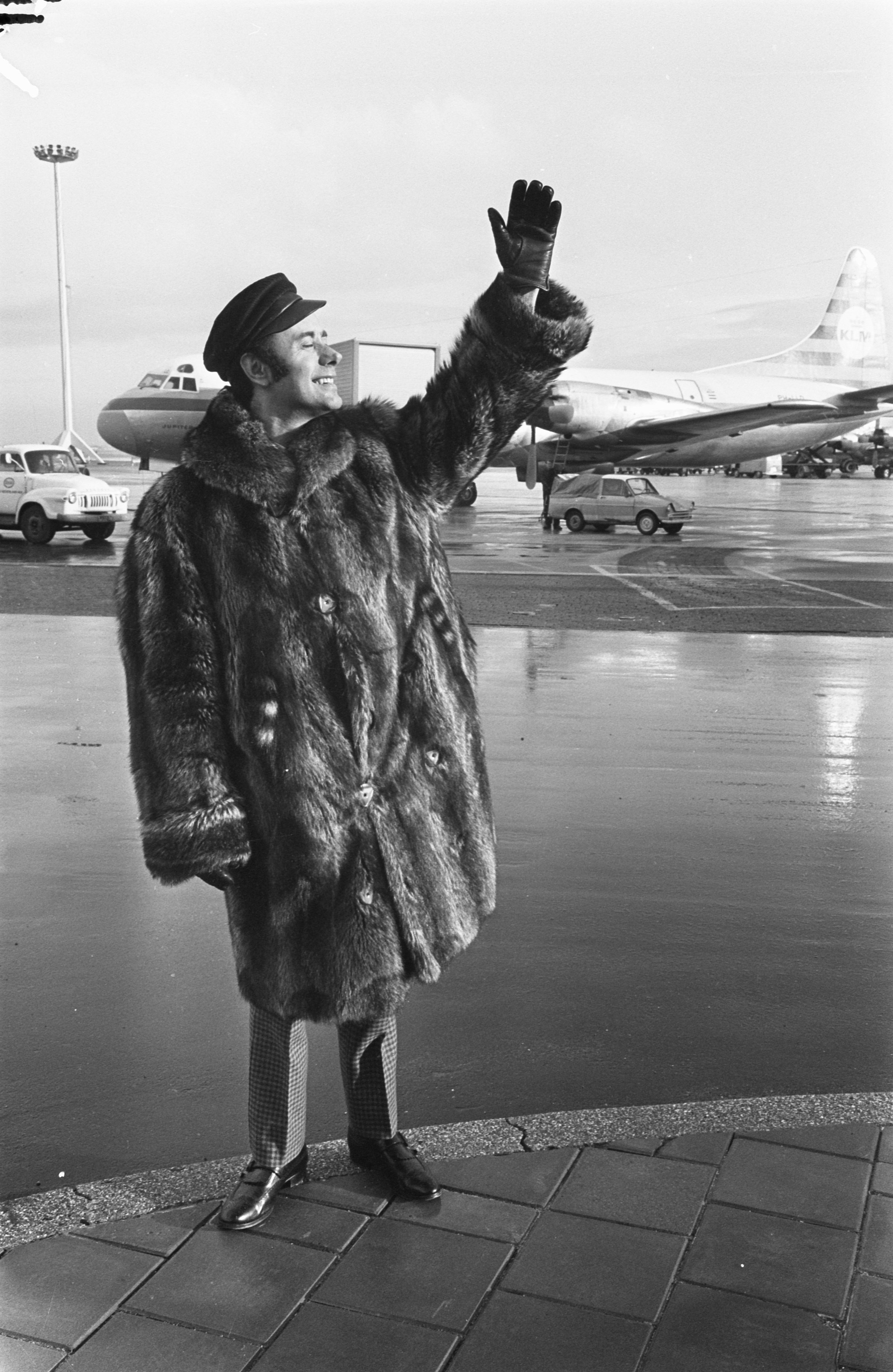
Actor Victor Spinetti in December 1967. He adapted Lennon's books into a one-act play with Adrienne Kennedy, then directed a production of it in June 1968.

On 3 October 1967, the National Theatre Company in London announced that they would be staging an adaption of Lennon's two books. The next month, on 24 November, Lennon compiled effects tapes at EMI Recording Studios for use in the production. Returning on 28 November for a Beatles recording session, he recorded speech and sound effects, working past midnight from 2:45 am to 4:30 am. Spinetti attended the session to assist Lennon in preparing the tapes. (Note: Spinetti has a cameo on "Christmas Time (Is Here Again)", recorded during the same session for the Beatles' 1967 Christmas record.) Sir Laurence Olivier produced the show, while Spinetti directed. Riley writes Adrian Mitchell collaborated on the production but does not specify in what capacity. In the spring of 1968, Spinetti and Lennon discussed ways the show could be performed, and in the summer Lennon attended several rehearsals of the show between sessions for the Beatles' eponymous album, also known as "the White album". In a June 1968 interview, he stated that "[w]hen I saw the rehearsal, I felt quite emotional ... I was too involved with it when it was written ... it took something like this to make me see what I was about then". A little over a week before its opening, Lennon recorded twelve more tape loops and sound effects for use in the play, copying them and taking the tape at the end of the session.

==== Premiere (June 1968) ====
The play opened at The Old Vic theatre in London on 18 June 1968, and Simon & Schuster published it the same year. It was heavily censored due to lines perceived as blasphemous and disrespectful to world leaders, including a speech from the Queen titled "my housebound and eyeball". (Note: Some of the world leaders referenced include Harold Macmillan, Selwyn Lloyd, James Callaghan, Edward Heath, Frank Cousins and George Woodcock. Lennon's poem "The Farts of Mousey Dung" is likely a play on "The Thoughts of Mao-Tse-tung".) Lennon was enthusiastic about it; Spinetti later recalled Lennon excitedly running up to him after the first night's performance, expressing that the play reminded him of his early enthusiasm for writing. Reception to the play however was mixed. Reviewing it for The New York Times, critic Martin Esslin described it as "ingenious and skillful, but ultimately less than satisfying" due to the lack of any underlying meaning. Sauceda retrospectively dismisses the play as a weak adaption that struggles to generate "thematic momentum". He criticises "many awkward and pointless attempts to ape Lennon's style" by Spinetti and Kennedy that "[infringe] on the integrity of John Lennon's work". For example, he writes that they changed Lennon's pun "Prevelant ze Gaute" – a play on French leader Charles de Gaulle – to "Pregnant De Gaulle". (Note: He also disparages Beatles writers Philip Norman and Anthony Fawcett, who incorrectly cite "Pregnant De Gaulle" as Lennon's original pun.)

Though they were both still married to other people, Yoko Ono joined Lennon at the opening performance in one of their first appearances in public together. (Note: Author Barry Miles writes it was the couple's second public appearance and that the first happened three days earlier, planting an acorn during an event at Coventry Cathedral. Lewisohn states it was the couple's third public appearance.) Some journalists challenged the couple, shouting "Where's your wife?" at Lennon, in reference to Cynthia. Cynthia, then holidaying in Italy with her family and her and Lennon's son, Julian, saw photos of the couple attending the premiere in an Italian newspaper. In an interview with Ray Coleman, she recalled, "I knew when I saw the picture that that was it", concluding that Lennon would only have brought Ono out in public if he was prepared for a divorce. (Note: A few days later, Magic Alex, a close associate of Lennon and the Beatles, travelled to Italy and notified Cynthia that Lennon planned to divorce her.) The ensuing controversy over Lennon and Ono's appearance drew press attention away from the play. Everett writes the couple were "lambasted in very hurtful ways by the press, often from an openly racist perspective". Ono biographer Jerry Hopkins suggests the couple's first experiment with heroin in July 1968 was in part due to the pain they experienced from their treatment by the press, an opinion Beatles writer Joe Goodden shares, though he writes that they first used the drug together in May 1968.

=== Other adaptations ===
Lennon briefly considered adapting his two books into a film, announcing at a 14 May 1968 press conference that Apple Corps would be producing it within the year. Besides The Lennon Play, playwright Jonathan Glew directed the book's only other adaption in 2015 after acquiring permission from Lennon's widow, Ono. Staged at the Edinburgh Festival Fringe, the production consisted of a dramatic reading of all of the book's pieces.
