= Christmas Time (Is Here Again) =

- Cover of the 1967 Christmas record, Christmas Time Is Here Again!

Song by the Beatles
- Released: 15 December 1967
- Recorded: 28 November 1967
- Studio: EMI, London
- Genre: Christmas music
- Length: 6:08
- Label: Lyntone
- Songwriters: John Lennon; Paul McCartney; George Harrison; Richard Starkey
- Producer: George Martin

The Beatles singles chronology
"Baby It's You" (1995)	"Free as a Bird" / "Christmas Time (Is Here Again)" (1995)	"Real Love" (1996)

"Christmas Time (Is Here Again)" is a Christmas song by the English rock band the Beatles, originally recorded for their fifth fan club Christmas record, Christmas Time Is Here Again! (1967). One of the few Beatles songs credited to all four members of the band, it consists of a blues based backing track as well as double-tracked vocals sung by them, George Martin and Victor Spinetti. The lyrics are mostly made up of the song's title refrain, repeated across nine verses.

Following its December 1967 release, "Christmas Time (Is Here Again)" remained officially unavailable for decades. A planned release in 1984 faltered after the abandonment of the Beatles' then-upcoming album Sessions. Apple released a shortened version of the song in December 1995 as the B-side to the song "Free as a Bird". The 1967 version was re-issued on The Christmas Records, a 2017 limited-edition box set of the band's original Christmas records.

== Background and composition ==
The Beatles began recording Christmas records in 1963, which were distributed in December free-of-charge to members of their Official Fan Club. Earlier records include spoken messages to their fans, while later years incorporate skits and music. Described by Jordan Runtagh of Rolling Stone as "the apex of their Christmas recordings", the Beatles' 1967 Christmas record, Christmas Time Is Here Again!, was their most extensive holiday message to date, with the band preparing a script ahead of time. Serving as an homage to radio and television programmes, its central narrative is based around a fictional group named the Ravellers, auditioning for a BBC radio show. The skits include tap dancing, a fictitious advertisement, and the group playing piano and singing about "Plenty of Jam Jars", among others. The recording concludes with each Beatle, as well as producer George Martin, offering season's greetings to their fans, followed by a poem from John Lennon titled "When Christmas Time is Over". Beatles writer John C. Winn describes it as a Scottish Yuletide poem, while Kenneth Womack calls the work a "Joycean ... nonsensical poem".

The beginning of "Christmas Time (Is Here Again)"
The recording begins with John Lennon yelling: "Interplanetary remix – thr [sic] – page four hundred and forty-four!" The rest of the song consists of a repeating of the title phrase.

In addition to the script, the band wrote a Christmas song, "Christmas Time (Is Here Again)". The song is one of the Beatles' few releases credited to all four members, just as their earlier 1967 instrumental "Flying" had been. (Note: MacDonald credits the song as Lennon–McCartney–Harrison–Starkey, while Womack writes it as Harrison–Lennon–McCartney–Starr. The 1967 disc does not include a songwriting credit. Lewisohn's liner notes to the "Free as a Bird" single credit it as John Lennon, Paul McCartney, George Harrison and Ringo Starr. Ringo Starr covered "Christmas Time (Is Here Again)" on his 1999 album I Wanna Be Santa Claus, with the song credited as George Harrison, John Lennon, Paul McCartney, Richard Starkey.) Played in the key of D major, the song's structure is blues-based, repeating nine identical verses followed by an instrumental verse. Womack writes that the song's "comic spirit" is similar to the Beatles' "You Know My Name (Look Up the Number)" – most of which had been recorded over the summer of 1967 – and was likely inspired by the Bonzo Dog Doo-Dah Band of BBC Radio 1. Author Steve Turner opines that the song illustrates the band's interest in children's songs that began with their 1966 track "Yellow Submarine" and reflects a combination of their nostalgia for 1940s Liverpool and the childlike tendencies of psychedelic music. Runtagh states that the song "is little more than a holiday mantra, but the Beatles sell it through their full-throated commitment and a clever arrangement reminiscent of their new single, 'Hello, Goodbye'".

== Recording ==
The Beatles recorded Christmas Time Is Here Again! on 28 November 1967 in Studio Three of EMI Recording Studios. Running from 6:00 pm to 2:45 am, Martin produced the session, assisted by balance engineer Geoff Emerick. Having last been in the studio two weeks earlier to finish the final recording for their new EP Magical Mystery Tour, it was the band's first Christmas record not made amidst another project. Actor Victor Spinetti was present at the session, helping Lennon prepare tapes for The Lennon Play: In His Own Write, a stage adaptation of the band member's books, In His Own Write (1964) and A Spaniard in the Works (1965). The band invited Spinetti to participate in the record's recording; he performed in the skits and sang on the song. Recorded in a single take, the basic recording features Ringo Starr on drums, George Harrison on a Gibson J-160E acoustic guitar, Lennon on timpani and Paul McCartney on piano. The Beatles, along with Martin and Spinetti, then overdubbed manually double-tracked vocals onto the original take.

Martin, again assisted by Emerick, returned to EMI the day after the session to mix its recordings. From 2:30 to 5:30 pm, they edited several mono remixes of the record, with the total number of remixes unknown. Edited together with the Beatles' skits, the finished version runs 6:08. Martin and Emerick copied their finished master version to tape, then sent it to Lyntone Records for pressing.

== Release ==
Released on 15 December 1967, the Christmas record's title, Christmas Time Is Here Again!, is a slight variation on the song's title. As with previous Beatles Christmas records, the seven-inch disc was only released to British fans, with Americans instead receiving a postcard. The complete take of the song has never been officially released. On 23 April 1976, a full version running 6:42 was mixed for mono. The mix was originally only played to executives at EMI Records but first appeared on a bootleg in 1983 and has continued to circulate on CD. Emerick remixed the song again in 1984 for the Beatles' abandoned Sessions album. He mixed the song for stereo, editing it down to 1:08 and cross-fading into a medley with "Ob-La-Di, Ob-La-Da". The song was expected to appear as the B-side of the album's single, "Leave My Kitten Alone", originally planned for a release around Christmas 1984. Never officially released, the two versions of the song began circulating as bootlegs in 1985 and 1986, respectively.

Apple officially released the song as the fourth track of the "Free as a Bird" CD single in the UK and US on 4 and 12 December 1995, respectively. Womack writes that Martin remixed the song for this release, while Winn says it is the same stereo mix made for Sessions, but edited down to the first 2:19. Lewisohn's liner notes credit Martin as producer and Emerick as "Engineer/Remix Engineer". After the song fades out the recording incorporates speech from the 1966 fan club disc, Pantomime: Everywhere It's Christmas, recorded on 6 December 1966, as well as Lennon's poem from the 1967 recording. As the B-side, the song did not chart in either the US or UK. On 15 December 2017, the original Christmas records were re-issued on a limited-edition box set, The Christmas Records.

== Personnel ==
According to Ian MacDonald, except where noted:

The Beatles

- John Lennon – double-tracked vocal, timpani
- Paul McCartney – double-tracked vocal, piano
- George Harrison – double-tracked vocal, acoustic guitar
- Ringo Starr – double-tracked vocal, drums

Additional musicians

- George Martin – double-tracked vocal
- Victor Spinetti – double-tracked vocal
