= The Beatles' Christmas records =

Discography

From Then to You

Compilation album by the Beatles
- Released: 18 December 1970
- Recorded: 17 October 1963 – December 1969
- Studio: Various
- Genres: Spoken word; surreal humour; rock; Christmas music; experimental
- Length: 43:58
- Labels: Apple / Lyntone LYN 2153/4 (UK), SBC-100 (US)
- Producers: Tony Barrow, George Martin, Kenny Everett

The Beatles UK chronology
Let It Be (1970)	From Then to You (1970)	1962–1966 (1973)

The Beatles North American chronology
Let It Be (1970)	The Beatles Christmas Album (1970)	1962–1966 (1973)

The Beatles' Christmas records are a series of flexi disc recordings issued by the English rock group the Beatles sent to members of their official fan clubs in the United Kingdom (UK) and the United States (US) each Christmas between 1963 and 1969. The discs contained both music and spoken messages.

An LP compilation of all seven was sent out in 1970 entitled From Then to You in the UK and The Beatles Christmas Album in the US. The LP was conceived as a means to appease fan-club members whose letters were not always being answered in a timely manner due to their sheer volume. The records included the Beatles' messages of thanks to "loyal Beatle people", along with skits, Christmas carols, and original compositions.

None of the original recordings had been subject to general release until a vinyl box set of all the records was distributed in December 2017. A version of "Christmas Time (Is Here Again)" gained an official release in 1995 as part of The Beatles Anthology project. It was an original composition which appeared in edited form on the 1967 record.

== 1963: The Beatles Christmas Record ==

- Recorded: 17 October 1963
- Location: Studio Two, EMI Studios, Abbey Road
- Writer: Tony Barrow
- Producer: Tony Barrow
- Issued: 6 December 1963
- Label: Lyntone, LYN 492
- Flexi disc: 7", 1 side, 33⅓ RPM
- Total time: 5:00

The first Christmas recording from the Beatles featured several renditions of the traditional carol "Good King Wenceslas" and individual messages from the four, ending with a closing chorus of "Rudolph the Red-Nosed Ringo". This offering, as well as 1964's, was scripted by Beatles' press officer Tony Barrow, who had instigated the Christmas message programme.

An edited version of this recording was sent to members of the Beatles' American fan-club in December 1964.

== 1964: Another Beatles Christmas Record ==

- Recorded: 26 October 1964
- Location: Studio Two, EMI Studios, Abbey Road
- Writer: Tony Barrow
- Producer: Tony Barrow
- Issued: 18 December 1964
- Label: Lyntone, LYN 757
- Flexi disc: 7", 1 side, 45 RPM
- Total time: 3:58

The song "Jingle Bells" is sung, followed by individual messages to the fans. John Lennon mocks the script by making it obvious he is reading from a prepared text; when Paul McCartney asks him if he wrote this himself, he says, "No it's somebody's bad handwrouter." John continues: "It's been a busy year, Beatle peedles, one way and another, but it's been a great year... too. You fans have seen to that, page two... Thanks a lot, folks, and a hap-py, er, Christmas and a merry goo year. Crimble maybe." (The statement is apparently handwritten, which can be observed at various points in the recording: McCartney reads "making them" as "melting them" before correcting himself, and George Harrison reads "quite a time" as "quiet time" before correcting himself with "great time"). The record ends with a brief rendition of the traditional song "Oh Can You Wash Your Father's Shirt?"

Another Beatles Christmas Record was not sent to American fans. Instead, US-based fans received an edited version of The Beatles Christmas Record, which had been sent to British fan-club members in 1963. Also, as opposed to using flexi-discs, the US fan club sent the message in a tri-fold cardboard mailer, with the "record" embedded in one of the flaps of cardboard.

== 1965: The Beatles Third Christmas Record ==

- Recorded: 8 November 1965
- Location: Studio Two, EMI Studios, Abbey Road
- Writer: Tony Barrow, The Beatles
- Producer: Tony Barrow
- Issued: 17 December 1965
- Label: Lyntone, LYN 948
- Flexi disc: 7", 1 side, 33⅓ RPM
- Total time: 6:20

Several off-key, a cappella versions of "Yesterday" are dispersed throughout the record, alongside Lennon's "Happy Christmas to Ya List'nas," "Auld Lang Syne" (which briefly morphs into an impression of Barry McGuire's "Eve of Destruction"), the beginning of Four Tops' "It's the Same Old Song", which stops after George tells them they cannot continue because the song is copyrighted, and an original poem titled "Christmas Comes But Once a Year".

Members of the Beatles US fan-club did not receive this (or any) Christmas flexi-disc in 1965. Rather, they received a black and white postcard, with a photo of the Fab Four and the message "Season's Greetings – Paul, Ringo, George, John." The Beatle Bulletin, the publication of the US fan-club, explained in its April 1966 edition that the tape arrived too late to prepare the record in time for Christmas.

== 1966: Pantomime: Everywhere It's Christmas ==

- Recorded: 25 November 1966
- Location: Dick James Music
- Writer: The Beatles
- Producer: George Martin
- Issued: 16 December 1966
- Label: Lyntone, LYN 1145
- Flexi disc: 7", 1 side, 33⅓ RPM
- Total time: 6:36

Recorded between sessions for "Strawberry Fields Forever", the 1966 offering included the usual greetings and thanks, but gave way to a pantomime-themed collection of original songs and comic skits. The songs include "Everywhere It's Christmas", "Orowayna", and "Please Don't Bring Your Banjo Back". McCartney plays the piano. The sketches performed include "Podgy the Bear and Jasper" and "Felpin Mansions".

Once again, the US fan-club members did not get a flexi-disc. Instead, they received a postcard with the message on one side and a short version of The Beatle Bulletin on the other, with enough room for a mailing label and postage.

== 1967: Christmas Time Is Here Again! ==

- Recorded: 28 November 1967
- Location: Studio Three EMI Studios, London
- Writer: The Beatles
- Producer: George Martin
- Issued: 15 December 1967
- Label: Lyntone, LYN 1360
- Flexi disc: 7", 1 side, 33⅓ RPM
- Total time: 6:06

An elaborate production, Christmas Time Is Here Again! was developed around the concept of several groups auditioning for a BBC radio show. The title song, "Christmas Time (Is Here Again)", serves as a refrain throughout the record. The Beatles portray a multitude of characters, including game show contestants, aspiring musicians ("Plenty of Jam Jars", by the Ravellers), and actors in a radio drama ("Theatre Hour"). At the end Lennon reads a poem, "When Christmas Time Is Over." This offering was likely a deliberate homage to/continuation of the broadly similar "Craig Torso" specials produced for BBC Radio 1 that same year by the Beatles' friends and collaborators the Bonzo Dog Doo-Dah Band, and also shares much in common with their then-unreleased track "You Know My Name (Look Up the Number)", recorded six months previously.

While UK fans received a flexi-disc in an elaborate sleeve, North American fans received a postcard similar to that of 1966. The cover sleeve was designed by John Lennon, Julian Lennon (Lennon's first son), and Ringo Starr.

== 1968: The Beatles 1968 Christmas Record ==

- Recorded: November–December 1968
- Location: various
- Writer: The Beatles
- Producer: Kenny Everett
- Issued: 20 December 1968
- Label: Lyntone, LYN 1743/4
- Flexi disc: 7", 2 sides, 33⅓ RPM
- Total time: 7:48

The first Beatles Christmas fan-club disc to be recorded by the individual Beatles separately, the 1968 offering is a collage of odd noises, musical snippets and individual messages. McCartney's song "Happy Christmas, Happy New Year" is featured, along with Lennon's poems "Jock and Yono" and "Once Upon a Pool Table". Also notable is a rendition of "Nowhere Man" by the ukulele-playing Tiny Tim, which Harrison recorded in New York. Also included is a sped-up snippet of the Beatles' own "Helter Skelter" and a brief snippet of Perrey & Kingsley's "Baroque Hoedown", which was used three years later in Disneyland's Main Street Electrical Parade. "Ob-La-Di, Ob-La-Da", "Yer Blues", and "Birthday" are also heard in the background for part of the message. The dialogue and songs for the flexi-disc were organised and edited together by DJ and friend of the Beatles, Kenny Everett.

Finally, the US fans got a flexi-disc for Christmas in 1968, but it came in a modified version of the 1967 UK sleeve.

== 1969: The Beatles Seventh Christmas Record ==

- Recorded: November–December 1969
- Location: various
- Writer: The Beatles
- Producer: Kenny Everett
- Issued: 19 December 1969
- Label: Lyntone, LYN 1970/1971
- Flexi disc: 7", 2 sides, 33⅓ RPM
- Total time: 7:39

The final Beatles Christmas offering was also recorded separately, as the band had effectively split by this point. It features an extensive visit with Lennon and his wife Yoko at their Tittenhurst Park estate, where they play "what will Santa bring me?" games. George Harrison and Ringo Starr appear only briefly, the latter to publicise his recent film, The Magic Christian. McCartney sings his original ad-lib, "This is to Wish You a Merry, Merry Christmas." Starting at 1:30, at the tail-end of Starr's song, the guitar solos from "The End" are heard, followed by Ono interviewing Lennon.

For the first and only time, the North American and UK album sleeve jackets were identical. The North American version of the flexi-disc had an elaborate collage of the Beatles' faces on it (drawn by Ringo), while the rear album sleeve contained stick-figure scribbles made by his son, Zak Starkey.

== Aftermath ==
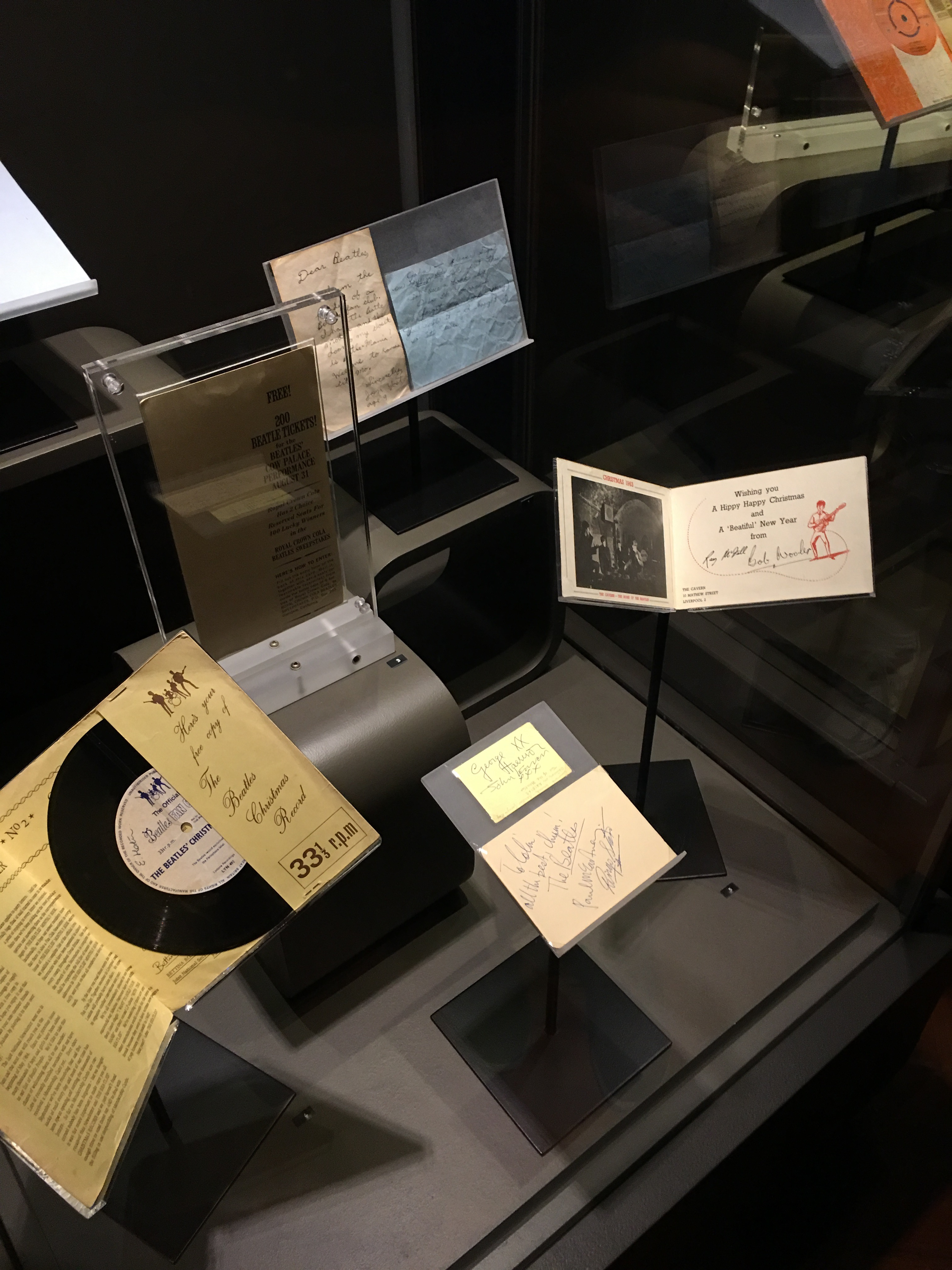
A collection of Beatles memorabilia at the Henry Ford Museum, with the 1963 Christmas record at left.

=== Reissues ===
In December 1970, in the wake of the band's break-up, the UK fan-club sent out a compilation LP of all seven of the Beatles' Christmas recordings, entitled From Then to You. The master tapes having been mislaid, the LP was mastered from copies of the original flexi discs. In the US, the seven messages were issued as The Beatles Christmas Album sent out by the fan-club around springtime 1971. It was the first time the 1964 and 1965 messages had been made available in the US. With no new recording, the LP served to remind that the Beatles were no more, but had the advantage of durability over the original flexi discs.

=== Bootlegs ===
With no general release of the recordings having been made until 2017, numerous bootlegs of the recordings appeared before then.

In December 1982, two albums claiming to comprise a legitimate release of the Beatles' Christmas messages appeared on the US market. One of them, which contained the 1963–1966 recordings, was called Christmas Reflections, on a label called Desert Vibrations Heritage Series (HSRD-SP1). The other, with the recordings from 1967 to 1969, was called Happy Michaelmas and was on a label called The Adirondack Group (AG-8146).

Less than a year later, on 29 September 1983, an entrepreneur announced that he was going to issue all seven messages on one record, which he planned to call John, Paul, George and Ringo. The Beatles' representatives quickly sued, claiming copyright and trademark violations, and won in court. As a result, the 1983 album was never released, and the two 1982 LPs were withdrawn.

=== Released extracts ===
The first three minutes of the music bed of the 1967 single, with greetings recorded for the 1966 single superimposed during the final minute, was released under the title "Christmas Time (Is Here Again)" as one of the B-sides of the "Free as a Bird" single in December 1995. (Starr recorded his own cover of "Christmas Time (Is Here Again)" on his 1999 Christmas album, I Wanna Be Santa Claus.)

Dialogue from the 1965 and 1966 recordings was featured as the tail-end of the 2006 compilation, Love. After the final number, "All You Need Is Love", has ended, nonsensical ad-libs from the group that appeared at the end of the 1965 flexi-disc are heard. Mere seconds later, this is merged into the final moments from the 1966 flexi-disc, complete with McCartney's ad-lib line, "Jolly Good".

An edited and abridged version of the 1963 single appeared as unlockable bonus content in 2009 The Beatles: Rock Band video game and was made available as a free download from the iTunes Store between 23 December 2010 and 9 January 2011.

=== 2017 release ===
The Christmas Records

Box set by The Beatles
- Released: 15 December 2017

The Beatles chronology
Sgt. Pepper's Lonely Hearts Club Band: 50th Anniversary Edition (2017)	The Christmas Records (2017)	The Beatles: 50th Anniversary Edition (2018)

A limited-edition vinyl box set containing all seven Christmas records, titled The Christmas Records, was officially released on 15 December 2017. The box set includes a 16-page booklet. On 2 November 2017, the Beatles posted a video advertisement on YouTube. The cover shows the faces of John, Paul, George and Ringo, all of whom are wearing Santa hats, and the words Happy Christmas Beatle People! are written on the cover.

== See also ==
- Outline of the Beatles
- The Beatles timeline
