= A Spaniard in the Works =

1965 book by John Lennon

- First edition
- Author: John Lennon
- Language: English
- Genre: Literary nonsense; Surreal poetry
- Published: 24 June 1965 by Jonathan Cape
- Publication place: United Kingdom
- Media type: Print
- OCLC: 252932871
- Preceded by: In His Own Write
- Followed by: Skywriting by Word of Mouth

A Spaniard in the Works is a nonsense book by English musician John Lennon, first published on 24 June 1965. The book consists of nonsensical stories and drawings similar to the style of his previous book, 1964's In His Own Write. The name is a pun on the expression "a spanner in the works".

Sales of the book were lower than Lennon's first book, with 100,000 copies bought in the three months following publication.

== Background ==
The second book was more disciplined because it was started from scratch. They said, "You've got so many months to write a book in." I wrote In His Own Write – at least some of it – while I was still at school, and it came spontaneously. But once it became: "We want another book from you, Mr. Lennon," I could only loosen up to it with a bottle of Johnnie Walker, and I thought, "If it takes a bottle every night to get me to write ..." That's why I didn't write any more.

— John Lennon, 1965

While some of John Lennon's first book, In His Own Write, had been written years earlier, he mostly wrote A Spaniard in the Works over the course of 1964. Beatles road manager Neil Aspinall recalled Lennon writing some of the book in Paris in January 1964 – predating the 23 March 1964 publication of In His Own Write – and bandmate George Harrison recalled Lennon writing while the two holidayed with their women, Pattie Boyd and Cynthia Lennon, in Tahiti in May 1964. Harrison, Boyd and Cynthia contributed lines, with Lennon sometimes inquiring of them for words that would work better in a particular sentence. During the same holiday, Lennon occupied himself by reading the books left on their private boat, including a complete set of Arthur Conan Doyle's Sherlock Holmes stories. Recognising the formula the stories employed, he spent three weeks writing a parody.

When most of the book was complete, the publisher, Jonathan Cape, requested more material from Lennon. To encourage him, they sent an Italian dictionary, which Lennon read through and found "a howl on its own". Despite further publisher requests that some material be removed or changed, Lennon argued for everything to be kept so as to maintain the work's spontaneity.

== Content ==
Jonathan Cape published A Spaniard in the Works in the UK on 24 June 1965, retailing for 10s 6d. Publication in the US followed on 1 July. Less inhibited than In His Own Write in terms of both writing style and length, some of the book's pieces run for five or six pages, including the Sherlock Holmes parody "The Singularge Experience of Miss Anne Duffield", which runs to nine pages. The book has 56 pieces, including twelve prose pieces, six poems and 38 drawings. A piece titled "The General Erection" satirises the UK's 1964 general election.

The book includes numerous references to racial minorities, as well as characters with deformities and disabilities. The title piece, for example, opens: "Jesus El Pifco was a foreigner and he knew it ... a garlic eating, stinking, little yellow greasy fascist bastard catholic Spaniard." In the piece "Our Dad", a father is kicked out of his home by his sons:

"You don't want me around," he said,
"I'm old and crippled too."
We didn't have the heart to say
"You're bloody right it's true."

Of the book's drawings, one depicts two street buskers, both wearing signs, one of whose states "I Am Blind" while the other reads "I Can See Quite Clearly". Another drawing depicts a large man with glasses, sitting in a chair looking at a four legged green monster.

== Reception ==
A Spaniard in the Works became an immediate best seller, going through four printings in its first four months and ultimately selling over 100,000 copies. Critically, reviewers were generally unenthusiastic, considering the book similar to In His Own Write but without the benefit of being unexpected.

Describing its parodies as forced, author Jonathan Gould opines that the writing of A Spaniard in the Works was not up to the standard set by In His Own Write. Still, he calls the book's punning inspired, especially that found in "The General Erection". Critic John Harris describes the book as a "more warped compendium" than its predecessor, and that the satiric piece "The General Erection" proved that Lennon "had a little more political nous than he let on". Critic Tim Riley writes that the book was more hastily written than Lennon's first book, yet also more ambitious, with much more wordplay and more genre parodies. He writes that "[d]etonating conformity was one of the few themes Lennon's pen mastered", though his drawings were more elegant in conveying "emotional mayhem".

== Analysis ==
Professor of English Ian Marshall describes Lennon's prose as "mad wordplay", noting Lewis Carroll's influence on his writing style and suggesting the book anticipates the lyrics of Lennon's later songs, including "Lucy in the Sky with Diamonds" and "I Am the Walrus". In discussing the theme of crowds in Lennon's 1967 songs "Being for the Benefit of Mr. Kite!" and "Good Morning Good Morning", scholar William M. Northcutt suggests that the story "The Wumberlog" pits the crowd against the individual. In the story, a young boy searches for the "Wumberlog" – a group of people who "Wot lived when they were dead". A "carrot" leads the boy to them, only to find that they are digging his grave. The group throw onto his body while mocking him, with Northcutt suggesting that the crowd's cruel toast of the boy demonstrates Lennon's conflicted feelings regarding crowds.

In his 1983 book, Literary Lennon: A Comedy of Letters, writer James Sauceda provides a postmodern dissection of both In His Own Write and A Spaniard in the Works. Everett describes the book as "a thorough but sometimes wrongheaded postmodern Finnegans Wake-inspired parsing". Riley calls Sauceda's insights "keen", but suggests more can be understood by analyzing the works with reference to Lennon's biography. For example, Riley suggests that Lennon wrote the poem "Our Dad" after two interactions with his father, Alfred Lennon, writing that both Alfred and the father character in the poem traveled often. The poem is mostly hostile in its tone before the final lines read: "But he'll remain in all ours hearts/—a buddy and a pal." Riley suggests that the poem's "bitingly satiric reversal" serves to satirise the tendency of British odes to always move towards a happy ending.

Asked in an interview about his "sick" humour, Lennon linked it to his school days, while also saying, "If it makes people sick, they're sick. It doesn't appear sick to me". Reflecting on the length of his Sherlock Holmes parody, Lennon said "[i]t seemed like a novel to me", and that he "wrote so many characters in it I forgot who they were".

== Legacy ==
In her study of Beatles historiography, historian Erin Torkelson Weber suggests that it reinforced perceptions of Lennon as "the smart one" of the group, and that the band's first film A Hard Day's Night further emphasised that view.

A Spaniard in the Works was the last collection of Lennon's writing published in his lifetime. Lennon began writing a third collection, planned for release in February 1966, but abandoned the project soon after. McCall's published the lone completed poem, "The Toy Boy", in its December 1966 issue. Harper & Row published a posthumous collection of Lennon writings in 1986. The collection, Skywriting by Word of Mouth, mostly consists of writings made during Lennon's "house-husband" period during his late 1970s break from recording.
