= Skywriting by Word of Mouth =

1986 book by John Lennon

- Author: John Lennon
- Language: English
- Genre: Experimental fiction
- Publisher: Harper and Row Publishers
- Publication date: 10 October 1986
- Pages: 208
- ISBN: 0-06-091444-0
- OCLC: 19560946
- Preceded by: A Spaniard in the Works

Skywriting by Word of Mouth, and Other Writings Including the Ballad of John and Yoko, is the third, and last, book written by English musician John Lennon. It was published posthumously in 1986 and included an afterword by Lennon's widow, Yoko Ono, whom he married in 1969. Like his other books, it contains miscellaneous writings and cartoons.

The book includes Lennon's autobiography (titled "The Ballad of John and Yoko", also the title of a song), in which he talks about the Beatles' break-up ("I started the band. I disbanded it.") and says that he has no hard feelings against his former bandmates: "Paul, George, and It's Only Ringo. I bear them no ill will." However, he also referred to them as "avant-garde revolutionary thinkers" a statement which could be interpreted as sarcastic in intent and declared "In retrospect, the Beatles were no more an important part of my life than any other (and less than some)."

Lennon mentioned the manuscript in a 1980 Playboy interview: "At one point [during his five-year "retirement" from music]... I wrote about two hundred pages of mad stuff". The manuscript was stolen from the Lennons' apartment in 1982, and later recovered in 1986, when Ono had it published.

== Contents ==
=== The Ballad of John and Yoko ===
This part of the book, titled "The Ballad of John and Yoko", is Lennon's only autobiography. It has four parts :

- "All We Were Saying Was Give Peace a Chance"
- "We'd All Love to See the Plan". (The title is shared with lines in the Beatles song Revolution).
- "We Fought the Law and the Law Lost"
- "The Mysterious Smell of Roses"

=== Two Virgins ===
Written at the time the public learned he was living with Ono as husband and wife

=== An Alphabet ===
Writings about John Lennon's alphabet

=== Skywriting by Word of Mouth ===
This section of the book has 29 parts, titled as follows;

- Skywriting by Word of Mouth
- Subtitled "Lucy in the Scarf with Diabetics"
- Up Yours
- Puma Eats Coast Guard
- Puma Eats Scapegoat
- Spare Me the Agony of Your Birth Control
- "Demented in Denmark"
- "It Nearly Happened in Rome"
- "A Paradox and a Matching Sweater, Please"
- "The Air Hung Thick Like a Hustler's Prick"
- "A Conspiracy of Silence Speaks Louder Than Words"
- "Nobel Peace Prize Awarded to Killer Whale"
- "The Art of Deception Is in the Eye of the Beholder"
- "Be Were Wolf of Limitations," or..."The Spirit of Boogie Be Upon You"
- "A Word in Your Orifice," or..."Bebe Seagull Bites Dust"
- The Incredible Mediocre Rabbits
- Europe on Five Camels a Day
- "Death Is Switching Channels on TV"
- Chapter 23 or 27: In Which a Harvard Graduate Faints at the Sight of Enlightenment
- "Florence de Bortcha Has Nuptials"
- Grueling Bi Centennial Scatters Entrails
- "A Reason for Breathing"
- "Hang This Garlick [sic!] Round Your Neck and You'll Never Marry"
- Experts Dance at Soc Hop Ball
- The Importance of Being Erstwhile
- "Never Cross a Horse with a Loose Woman"
- The Life of Reilly, by Ella Scott Fizgeraldine
- Chapter 41: A Complete Change of Pacemaker
- Never Underestimate the Power of Attorney
